= List of members of the 1st Jatiya Sangsad =

1st Jatiya Sangsad
←	Constituent Assembly	2nd Sangsad	→
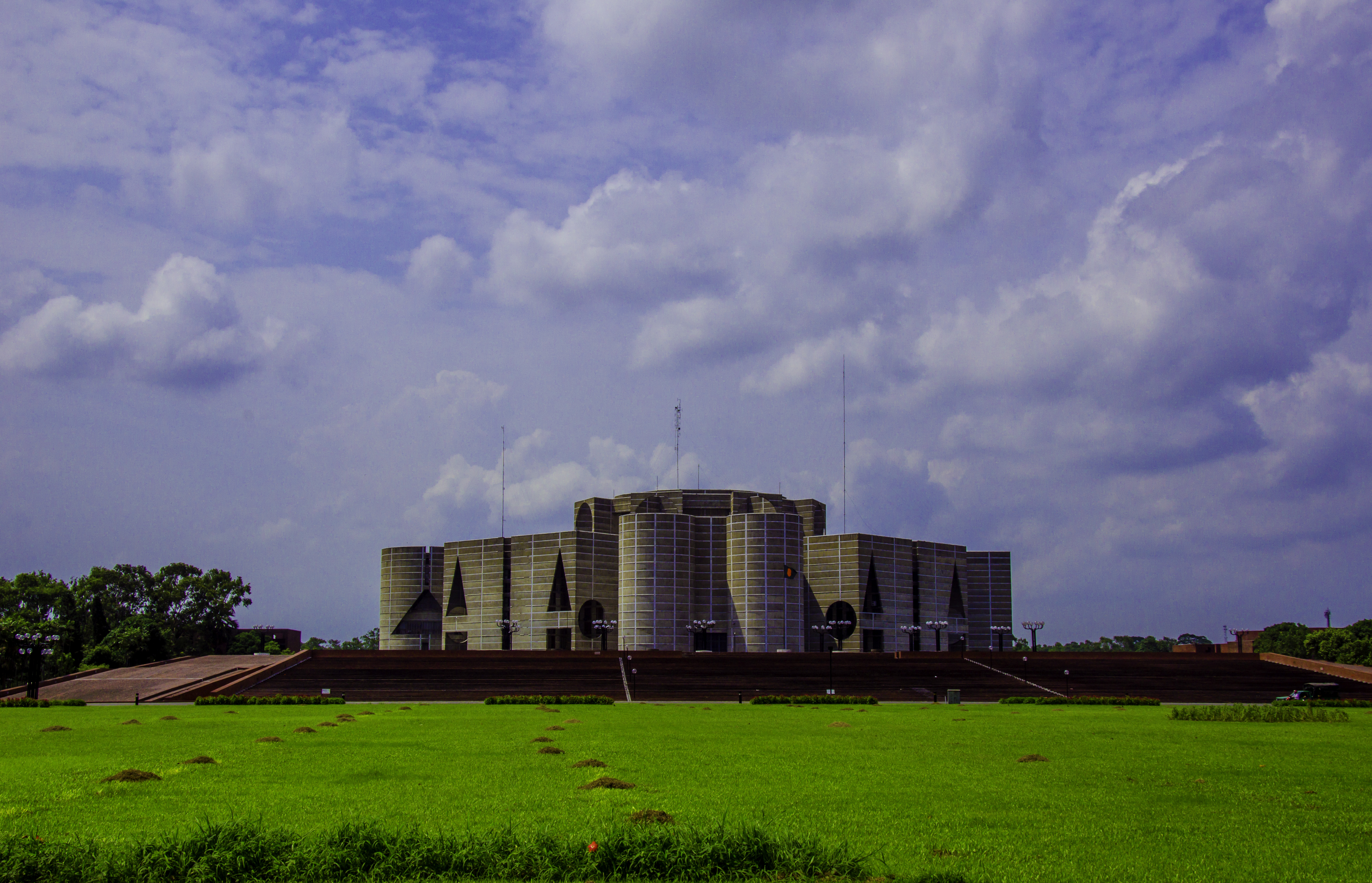

Overview
- Legislative body: Parliament of the Bangladesh
- Jurisdiction: Bangladesh
- Meeting place: Sangsad Bhaban
- Term: 7 March 1973 – 6 November 1975
- Election: 1973 Bangladeshi general election

Jatiya Sangsad
- Members: 300

This is a list of members of Parliament (MP) elected to the 1st Parliament of the Jatiya Sangsad, the National Parliament of Bangladesh, by Bangladeshi constituencies. The list includes both MPs elected at the 1973 general election, held on 7 March 1973, and nominated women's members for reserved seats and those subsequently elected in by-elections.

== Members ==
=== Elected members of parliament ===
No	Constituency	Name	Party	Notes
1	Dinajpur-1	Kamaruddin Ahmed	Awami League	
2	Dinajpur-2	Sirajul Islam	Awami League	
3	Dinajpur-3	Mohammad Fazlul Karim	Awami League	
4	Dinajpur-4	Ali Akbar	Awami League	
5	Dinajpur-5	Abdul Haque	Awami League	
6	Dinajpur-6	Mohammed Yusuf Ali	Awami League	
7	Dinajpur-7	Amzad Hossain	Awami League	
8	Dinajpur-8	Shah Mahatab Ahmad	Awami League	
9	Dinajpur-9	Sardar Mosharraf Hossain	Awami League	
10	Dinajpur-10	Abdul Latif Mia	Awami League	
11	Rangpur-1	Abdur Rouf	Awami League	
12	Rangpur-2	Afsar Ali Ahmed	Awami League	
13	Rangpur-3	Jonab Ali Ukil	Awami League	
14	Rangpur-4	Mohammad Alim Uddin	Awami League	
15	Rangpur-5	Abid Ali	Awami League	
16	Rangpur-6	Karim Uddin Mohammad	Awami League	
17	Rangpur-7	Anisul Haque Chowdhury	Awami League	
18	Rangpur-8	Siddique Hossain	Awami League	
19	Rangpur-9	Abdul Awal	Awami League	
20	Rangpur-10	Hamiduzzaman Sarkar	Awami League	
21	Rangpur-11	Matiur Rahman	Awami League	
22	Rangpur-12	Shamsul Haque Chowdhury	Awami League	
23	Rangpur-13	Md. Riaz Uddin Ahmed	Awami League	
24	Rangpur-14	Abul Hossain	Awami League	
25	Rangpur-15	Kanai Lal Sarker	Awami League	
26	Rangpur-16	Mohammad Sadakat Hossain	Awami League	
27	Rangpur-17	Shamsul Hossain Sarkar	Awami League	
28	Rangpur-18	Abu Taleb Mia	Awami League	
29	Rangpur-19	Lutfor Rahman	Awami League	
30	Rangpur-20	Waliur Rahman	Awami League	
31	Rangpur-21	Shah Jahangir Kabir	Awami League	
32	Rangpur-22	Tofazzal Hossain	Awami League	
33	Bogra-1	Mafiz Ali Chowdhury	Awami League	
34	Bogra-2	Kasim Uddin Ahmed	Awami League	
35	Bogra-3	Mohammad Hasan Ali Talukder	Awami League	
36	Bogra-4	Mozaffar Hossain	Awami League	
37	Bogra-5	Mostafizur Rahman Patal	Awami League	
38	Bogra-6	S. M. Sirajul Islam Suruj	Awami League	
39	Bogra-7	Amanullah Khan	Awami League	
40	Bogra-8	AK Mujibur Rahman	Awami League	
41	Bogra-9	Hashem Ali Khan	Awami League	
42	Rajshahi-1	Moin Uddin Ahmed	Awami League	
43	Rajshahi-2	Khalid Ali Mia	Awami League	
44	Rajshahi-3	A. A. M. Mesbahul Haq	Awami League	
45	Rajshahi-4	Shah Sirajul Islam Chowdhury	Awami League	
46	Rajshahi-5	Sardar Mohammad Jahangir	Awami League	
47	Rajshahi-6	Atowar Rahman Talukder	Awami League	
48	Rajshahi-7	Emaz Uddin Pramanik	Awami League	
49	Rajshahi-8	Abdul Jalil	Awami League	
50	Rajshahi-9	Mohammad Baitullah	Awami League	
51	Rajshahi-10	Abul Hasnat Muhammad Qamaruzzaman	Awami League	
52	Rajshahi-11	Mainuddin Ahmed Manik	Awami League	
53	Rajshahi-12	Sardar Amjad Hossain	Awami League	
54	Rajshahi-13	Shah Muhammad Zafarullah	Awami League	
55	Rajshahi-14	Md. Alauddin	Awami League	
56	Rajshahi-15	Saiful Islam	Awami League	
57	Rajshahi-16	Ashraful Islam	Awami League	
58	Rajshahi-17	Rafiq Uddin Sarkar	Awami League	
59	Pabna-1	Muhammad Mansur Ali	Awami League	
60	Pabna-2	Syed Haider Ali	Awami League	
61	Pabna-3	Raushanul Haque Moti Mia	Awami League	
62	Pabna-4	Dabir Uddin Ahmed	Awami League	
63	Pabna-5	Abdul Momin Talukder	Awami League	
64	Pabna-6	Abu Bakar	Awami League	
65	Pabna-7	Abdur Razzak Mukul	Awami League	
66	Pabna-8	Abu Sayeed	Awami League	
67	Pabna-9	Ahmed Tafiz Uddin	Awami League	
68	Pabna-10	Mozammel Haque Samaji	Awami League	
69	Pabna-11	Mohiuddin Ahmed	Awami League	
70	Pabna-12	Amjad Hossain	Awami League	
71	Kushtia-1	Azizur Rahman Akkas	Awami League	
72	Kushtia-2	Abdur Rouf Chowdhury	Awami League	
73	Kushtia-3	M Amir-ul Islam	Awami League	
74	Kushtia-4	Mohammad Golam Kibria	Awami League	
75	Kushtia-5	Mohammad Shahiduddin	Awami League	
76	Kushtia-6	Badal Rashid	Awami League	
77	Kushtia-7	Ashab-ul-Haq	Awami League	
78	Jessore-1	Kazi Khademul Islam	Awami League	
79	Jessore-2	Nur-e-Alam Siddiqui	Awami League	
80	Jessore-3	J. K. M. A. Aziz	Awami League	
81	Jessore-4	Mohammad Moinuddin Miazi	Awami League	
82	Jessore-5	Tabibar Rahman Sarder	Awami League	
83	Jessore-6	Abul Islam	Awami League	
84	Jessore-7	Pijush Kanti Bhattacharjee	Awami League	
85	Jessore-8	Shah Hadiizzzaman	Awami League	
86	Jessore-9	Raushan Ali	Awami League	
87	Jessore-10	Abdur Rasheed Biswas	Awami League	
88	Jessore-11	Muhammad Sohrab Hossain	Awami League	
89	Jessore-12	Ekhlas Uddin Ahmed	Awami League	
90	Jessore-13	Khandaker Abdul Hafeez	Awami League	
91	Khulna-1	M. A. Khair	Awami League	
92	Khulna-2	Sheikh Abdur Rahman	Awami League	
93	Khulna-3	Mir Sakhawat Ali	Awami League	
94	Khulna-4	Sheikh Abdul Aziz	Awami League	
95	Khulna-5	Kuber Chandra Biswas	Awami League	
96	Khulna-6	M. A. Bari	Awami League	
97	Khulna-7	Momen Uddin Ahmed	Awami League	
98	Khulna-8	Enayet Ali Sana	Awami League	
99	Khulna-9	SM Babar Ali	Awami League	
100	Khulna-10	MM Nawab Ali	Awami League	
101	Khulna-11	Mohammad Mohsin	Awami League	
102	Khulna-12	A. F. M. Entaz Ali	Awami League	
103	Khulna-13	Syed Kamal Bakht	Awami League	
104	Khulna-14	Salahuddin Yusuf	Awami League	
108	Patuakhali-4	Asmat Ali Sikder	Awami League	
106	Patuakhali-2	Shahjada Abdul Malek Khan	Awami League	
107	Patuakhali-3	Habibur Rahman Mia	Awami League	
105	Patuakhali-1	Kazi Abul Kashem	Awami League	
109	Patuakhali-5	Nizam Uddin Ahmed	Awami League	
110	Patuakhali-6	Abdul Aziz Khandaker	Awami League	
111	Patuakhali-7	Abdul Barek Mia	Awami League	
112	Bakerganj-1	Tofail Ahmed	Awami League	
113	Bakerganj-2	Nazrul Islam	Awami League	
114	Bakerganj-3	Motahar Uddin	Awami League	
115	Bakerganj-4	Yusuf Hossain Humayun	Awami League	
116	Bakerganj-5	Abdul Mannan Howlader	Awami League	
117	Bakerganj-6	Mokim Hossain Howlader	Awami League	
118	Bakerganj-7	Amir Hossain Amu	Awami League	
119	Bakerganj-8	Nurul Islam Manzur	Awami League	
120	Bakerganj-9	Fazlul Haque Talukdar	Awami League	
121	Bakerganj-10	Mohiuddin Ahmed	Awami League	
122	Bakerganj-11	AKM Nurul Karim Khair	Awami League	
123	Bakerganj-12	Harnath Bain	Awami League	
124	Bakerganj-13	Abdur Rab Serniabat	Awami League	
125	Bakerganj-14	Chittaranjan Sutar	Awami League	
126	Bakerganj-15	Khitish Chandra Mondal	Awami League	
127	Bakerganj-16	Enayet Hossain Khan	Awami League	
128	Bakerganj-17	Mainul Hosein	Awami League	
128	Bakerganj-17		BAKSAL	1975 by-election
129	Bakerganj-18	Mohiuddin Ahmed	Awami League	
130	Tangail-1	Abdus Sattar	Jatiya Samajtantrik Dal	
131	Tangail-2	Hatem Ali Talukdar	Awami League	
132	Tangail-3	Shamsur Rahman Khan Shahjahan	Awami League	
133	Tangail-4	Abdul Latif Siddiqui	Awami League	
134	Tangail-5	Mirza Tofazzal Hossain Mukul	Awami League	
135	Tangail-6	Abdul Mannan	Awami League	
136	Tangail-7	Shawkat Ali Khan	Awami League	
137	Tangail-8	Fazlur Rahman Faruque	Awami League	
138	Tangail-9	Humayun Khalid	Awami League	
139	Mymensingh-1	Md. Delwar Hossain	Awami League	
140	Mymensingh-2	Rashed Mosharraf	Awami League	
141	Mymensingh-3	Nurul Islam	Awami League	
142	Mymensingh-4	Abdul Malek	Awami League	
143	Mymensingh-5	Mohammad Abdul Hakim	Awami League	
144	Mymensingh-6	Md. Anisur Rahman	Awami League	
145	Mymensingh-7	Mizanur Rahman	Awami League	
146	Mymensingh-8	Md. Abdul Halim	Awami League	
147	Mymensingh-9	Kudratullah Mandal	Awami League	
148	Mymensingh-10	Shamsul Haque	Awami League	
149	Mymensingh-11	Nazim Uddin	Awami League	
150	Mymensingh-12	Anwarul Quader	Awami League	
151	Mymensingh-13	Rafiq Uddin Bhuiyan	Awami League	
152	Mymensingh-14	AK Mosharraf Hossain Akand	Awami League	
153	Mymensingh-15	Md. Shamsul Haque	Awami League	
154	Mymensingh-16	ANM Nazrul Islam	Awami League	
155	Mymensingh-17	Abdur Rashid	Awami League	
156	Mymensingh-18	Mostafa MA Matin	Awami League	
157	Mymensingh-19	Abul Hashem	Awami League	
158	Mymensingh-20	Abdul Majid Tara Mia	Awami League	
159	Mymensingh-21	Sadir Uddin Ahmed	Awami League	
160	Mymensingh-22	Abdul Momin	Awami League	
161	Mymensingh-23	Fazlur Rahman Khan	Awami League	
162	Mymensingh-24	Zubed Ali	Awami League	
163	Mymensingh-25	Abdul Khaleq	Awami League	
164	Mymensingh-26	Asaduzzaman Khan	Awami League	
165	Mymensingh-27	Manoranjan Dhar	Awami League	
166	Mymensingh-28	Syed Nazrul Islam	Awami League	
167	Mymensingh-29	MA Quddus	Awami League	
168	Mymensingh-30	Mohammad Abdul Hamid	Awami League	
169	Mymensingh-31	Manzoor Ahmad Bachchu	Awami League	
170	Mymensingh-32	Zillur Rahman	Awami League	
171	Dhaka-1	Abu Md. Saidur Rahman	Awami League	
172	Dhaka-2	Moslem Uddin Khan	Awami League	
173	Dhaka-3	Mofizul Islam Khan Kamal	Awami League	
174	Dhaka-4	Mir Abul Khayer	Awami League	
175	Dhaka-5	Shah Moazzem Hossain	Awami League	
176	Dhaka-6	Korban Ali	Awami League	
177	Dhaka-7	Abdul Karim Bepari	Awami League	
178	Dhaka-8	K. M. Shamsul Huda	Awami League	
179	Dhaka-9	Rafiq Uddin Ahmed	Awami League	
180	Dhaka-10	Khondakar Harun-ur-Rashid	Awami League	
181	Dhaka-11	Borhan Uddin Ahmed	Awami League	
182	Dhaka-12	Sheikh Mujibur Rahman	Awami League	
183	Dhaka-13	Gazi Golam Mostafa	Awami League	
184	Dhaka-14	Kamal Hossain	Awami League	
185	Dhaka-15	Shamim Misir	Awami League	
186	Dhaka-16	Shamsul Haq	Awami League	
187	Dhaka-17	Kazi Mozammel Haque	Awami League	
188	Dhaka-18	Mohammad Anwar Jung Talukdar	Awami League	
189	Dhaka-19	Ataur Rahman Khan	Bangladesh Jatiya League	
190	Dhaka-20	Tajuddin Ahmad	Awami League	
191	Dhaka-21	Moyez Uddin	Awami League	
192	Dhaka-22	Gazi Fazlur Rahman	Awami League	
193	Dhaka-23	Rabiul Alam Kiran Khan	Awami League	
194	Dacca-24	Aftab Uddin Bhuiyan	Awami League	
195	Dhaka-25	Mosleh Uddin Ahmed	Awami League	
196	Dhaka-26	Kazi Sahabuddin Ahmed	Awami League	
197	Dhaka-27	Sadat Ali Sikder	Awami League	
198	Dhaka-28	Mubarak Hossain	Awami League	
199	Dhaka-29	Afzal Hossain	Awami League	
200	Dhaka-30	AKM Samsuzzoha	Awami League	
201	Faridpur-1	S. A. Malek	Awami League	
202	Faridpur-2	Khandaker Nurul Islam	Awami League	
203	Faridpur-3	Syed Kamrul Islam Mohommod Salehuddin	Independent then joined NAP Bhasani	Died: 24 May 1983
204	Faridpur-4	Delwar Hossain	Awami League	
205	Faridpur-5	Imam Uddin Ahmad	Awami League	
206	Faridpur-6	Abdus Salam Mia	Awami League	
207	Faridpur-7	KM Obaidur Rahman	Awami League	
208	Faridpur-8	Shamsuddin Mollah	Awami League	
209	Faridpur-9	Nazir Ahmad Talukder	Awami League	
210	Faridpur-10	Nurul Qadir Junu	Awami League	
211	Faridpur-11	Mollah Jalaluddin Ahmed	Awami League	
212	Faridpur-12	Santosh Kumar Biswas	Awami League	
213	Faridpur-13	Ilias Ahmed Chowdhury	Awami League	
214	Faridpur-14	Asmat Ali Khan	Awami League	
215	Faridpur-15	Aminul Islam Danesh Mia	Awami League	
216	Faridpur-16	Abdur Razzaq	Awami League	
217	Faridpur-17	AFM Nurul Haque Hawladar	Awami League	Died: 31 May 1973
217	Faridpur-17	M. A. Kasem	Awami League	1973 by-election
218	Faridpur-18	Abidur Reza Khan	Awami League	
219	Faridpur-19	Phani Bhushan Majumder	Awami League	
220	Sylhet-1	Abdul Hekim Chowdhury	Awami League	
221	Sylhet-2	Abdus Samad Azad	Awami League	
222	Sylhet-3	Abdur Rais	Awami League	
223	Sylhet-4	A. H. M. Abdul Hai	Awami League	
224	Sylhet-5	A. Zahur Miah	Awami League	
225	Sylhet-6	M. A. G. Osmani	Awami League	
225	Sylhet-6	Muhammad Ashraf Ali	BAKSAL	1975 by-election
226	Sylhet-7	Nurul Islam Khan	Awami League	
227	Sylhet-8	Dewan Farid Gazi	Awami League	
228	Sylhet-9	Habibur Rahman (Tota Mia)	Awami League	
229	Sylhet-10	MA Latif	Awami League	
230	Sylhet-11	Abdur Rahim	Awami League	
231	Sylhet-12	Muhammad Sirajul Islam	Awami League	
232	Sylhet-13	Abdul Muttakin Chowdhury	Awami League	
233	Sylhet-14	Toabur Rahim	Awami League	
234	Sylhet-15	Altafur Rahman Chowdhury	Awami League	
235	Sylhet-16	Gias Uddin Chowdhury	Awami League	
236	Sylhet-17	Enamul Haque Mostafa Shahid	Awami League	
237	Sylhet-18	Manik Chowdhury	Awami League	
238	Sylhet-19	Mostafa Ali	Awami League	
239	Sylhet-20	Mohammad Abdur Rab	Awami League	
240	Sylhet-21	Abdul Mannan Chowdhury	Awami League	
241	Comilla-1	Mohammad Sayedul Haque	Awami League	
242	Comilla-2	Taher Uddin Thakur	Awami League	
243	Comilla-3	Ali Azam	Awami League	
244	Comilla-4	Serajul Haque	Awami League	
245	Comilla-5	Abdul Kuddas Makhan	Awami League	
246	Comilla-6	Kazi Akbar Uddin Mohammad Siddique	Awami League	
247	Comilla-7	A. W. M. Abdul Haque	Awami League	
248	Comilla-8	Muzaffar Ali	Awami League	
249	Comilla-9	Khandaker Mushtaq Ahmed	Awami League	
250	Comilla-10	Wali Ahmed	Awami League	
251	Comilla-11	Ali Ashraf	Awami League	
252	Comilla-12	Muhammad Shujat Ali	Awami League	
253	Comilla-13	Abdul Hakim	Awami League	
254	Comilla-14	Mohammad Yunus	Awami League	
255	Comilla-15	Mohammad Khorshed Alam	Awami League	
256	Comilla-16	Oli Ahmed	Awami League	
257	Comilla-17	Kazi Zahirul Qayyum	Awami League	
258	Comilla-18	Abul Kalam Mazumdar	Awami League	
259	Comilla-19	Jalal Ahmed	Awami League	
260	Comilla-20	Abdul Awal	Awami League	
261	Comilla-21	Abdus Sattar	Awami League	
262	Comilla-22	Abu Jafar Mohammad Moinuddin	Awami League	
263	Comilla-23	Golam Morshed Farooqi	Awami League	
264	Comilla-24	Mizanur Rahman Chowdhury	Awami League	
265	Comilla-25	Abdullah Sarkar	Awami League	
266	Comilla-26	Safiullah	Awami League	
267	Noakhali-1	A. B. M. Musa	Awami League	
268	Noakhali-2	Khawaja Ahmed	Awami League	
269	Noakhali-3	A B M Taleb Ali	Awami League	
270	Noakhali-4	Abu Naser Chowdhury	Awami League	
271	Noakhali-5	Abdur Rahman	Awami League	
272	Noakhali-6	Md. Hanif	Awami League	
273	Noakhali-7	Nurul Haque	Awami League	
274	Noakhali-8	Abdur Rashid	Awami League	
275	Noakhali-9	Mohammad Mohammadullah	Awami League	
276	Noakhali-10	Mahmudur Rahman Belayet	Awami League	
277	Noakhali-11	A.K.M. Shahjahan Kamal	Awami League	
278	Noakhali-12	Abdul Malek Ukil	Awami League	
279	Noakhali-13	Sirajul Islam	Awami League	
280	Noakhali-14	Amirul Islam Kalam	Jatiya Samajtantrik Dal	
281	Chittagong-1	Mosharraf Hossain	Awami League	
282	Chittagong-2	Mustafizur Rahman Siddiqi	Awami League	
283	Chittagong-3	M. Obaidul Huq	Awami League	
284	Chittagong-4	Nurul Alam Chowdhury	Awami League	
285	Chittagong-5	Abdul Wahab	Awami League	
286	Chittagong-6	Mohammad Khaled	Awami League	
287	Chittagong-7	M. A. Manan	Awami League	
288	Chittagong-8	Zahur Ahmed Chowdhury	Awami League	
289	Chittagong-9	Kafiluddin	Awami League	
290	Chittagong-10	Abul Kasem	Awami League	
291	Chittagong-11	Nurul Islam Chowdhury	Awami League	
292	Chittagong-12	Mohammad Idris	Awami League	
293	Chittagong-13	B. M. Faizur Rahman	Awami League	
294	Chittagong-14	M. Siddique	Awami League	
295	Chittagong-15	Shah-e-Jahan Chowdhury	Awami League	
296	Chittagong-16	Shamsuddin Ahmad Chowdhury	Awami League	
297	Chittagong-17	Mostaq Ahmad Chowdhury	Awami League	
298	Chittagong-18	Osman Sarwar Alam Chowdhury	Awami League	
299	Hill Chittagong-1	Manabendra Narayan Larma	Awami League	
300	Hill Chittagong-2	Chaithoai Roaza	Parbatya Chattagram Jana Samhati Samiti	

=== Members of the Reserved Women's Seat ===
Sl. No.	Name	Seat No.	Political Political party
301	Taslima Abed	Seat-01	Awami League
302	Nazma Shamima Laiju	Seat-02	Awami League
303	Jahanara Rob	Seat-03	Awami League
304	Razia Banu	Seat-04	Awami League
305	Farida Rahman	Seat-05	Awami League
306	Azra Ali	Seat-06	Awami League
307	Rafia Akhtar Dolly	Seat-07	Awami League
308	Khurshida Moyejuddin	Seat-08	Awami League
309	Syeda Sajeda Chowdhury	Seat-09	Awami League
310	Nurjahan Murshid	Seat-10	Awami League
311	Konika Biswas	Seat-11	Awami League
312	Abeda Chowdhury	Seat-12	Awami League
313	Momtaz Begum	Seat-13	Awami League
314	Arjumand Banu	Seat-14	Awami League
315	Sudipta Dewan	Seat-15	Awami League
