= List of members of the Constituent Assembly of Bangladesh =

Constituent Assembly
←	4th East Pakistan Provincial Assembly	1st Jatiya Sangsad	→

Overview
- Legislative body: Constituent Assembly of Bangladesh
- Jurisdiction: Bangladesh
- Meeting place: Sangsad Bhaban
- Term: 10 April 1972 – 16 December 1972
- Election: 1970 Pakistani general election in East Pakistan; 1970 East Pakistan Provincial Assembly election; January 1971 East Pakistan by-elections
- Government: Second Mujib ministry

The Constituent Assembly of Bangladesh was established in 1972 following the independence of Bangladesh, comprising the representatives elected in the 1970 Pakistani general and the provincial Assembly election.

== Elected members ==
The following is a list of elected members: (Note: The elected candidates died before the formation of the Constituent Assembly were Amjad Hossain, Zikrul Haque, Nazmul Hoque Sarkar, Mashiur Rahman, Mohammad Aminuddin and M. A. Aziz.)

Region	Name	Party
Rangpur	Mazahar Hossain	Awami League
Rangpur	Md. Reazuddin Ahmed	Awami League
Rangpur	Mohammad Sadakat Hossain	Awami League
Rangpur	Lutfor Rahman	Awami League
Rangpur	Shah Abdul Hamid	Awami League
Rangpur	Mohammad Azizur Rahman	Awami League
Rangpur	Mohammad Nural Haque	Awami League
Rangpur	Abdul Awal	Awami League
Rangpur	Matiur Rahman	Awami League
Rangpur	Abdur Rauf	Awami League
Rangpur	Afsar Ali Ahmed	Awami League
Rangpur	Abdur Rahman Chowdhury	Awami League
Rangpur	Mohammad Amin	Awami League
Rangpur	Azharul Islam	Awami League
Rangpur	Abid Ali	Awami League
Rangpur	Karim Uddin Ahmed	Awami League
Rangpur	Ilahi Buksh Sarkar	Awami League
Rangpur	Siddique Hossain	Awami League
Rangpur	Shah Abdur Razzak	Awami League
Rangpur	Hamiduzzaman Sarkar	Awami League
Rangpur	Md. Gazi Rahman	Awami League
Rangpur	Shamsul Haque Chowdhury	Awami League
Rangpur	Abdul Hakim	Awami League
Rangpur	Abul Hossain	Awami League
Rangpur	Abdullah Sarwardi	Awami League
Rangpur	Nurul Islam	Awami League
Rangpur	Shamsul Hossain Sarkar	Awami League
Rangpur	M. A. Talib Miah	Awami League
Rangpur	Waliur Rahman	Awami League
Rangpur	Mafizur Rahman	Awami League
Rangpur	Jamalur Rahman Pradhan	Awami League
Rangpur	Azizur Rahman	Awami League
Dinajpur	Mosharraf Hossain Chowdhury	Awami League
Dinajpur	Azizur Rahman	Awami League
Dinajpur	Mohammad Moksed Ali	Awami League
Dinajpur	Muhammad Yusuf Ali	Awami League
Dinajpur	Shah Mahatab Ahmad	Awami League
Dinajpur	Wakil Uddin Mondal	Awami League
Dinajpur	Kamaruddin Ahmed	Awami League
Dinajpur	Sirajul Islam	Awami League
Dinajpur	Mohammad Fazlul Karim	Awami League
Dinajpur	Ekramul Haque	Awami League
Dinajpur	Golam Rahman Shah	Awami League
Dinajpur	S. M. Yusuf	Awami League
Dinajpur	M. Abdur Rahim	Awami League
Dinajpur	Md. Khatibur Rahman	Awami League
Dinajpur	Sardar Mosharraf Hossain	Awami League
Dinajpur	Kazi Abdul Majid Chowdhury	Awami League
Bogra	Mafiz Ali Chowdhury	Awami League
Bogra	Mujibur Rahman Mondal	Awami League
Bogra	Akbar Ali Khan Chowdhury	Awami League
Bogra	Saidur Rahman	Awami League
Bogra	Kasim Uddin Ahmed	Awami League
Bogra	Sheikh Abul Hasnat Chowdhury	Awami League
Bogra	Mozaffar Hossain	Awami League
Bogra	Hossain Ali Sarkar	Awami League
Bogra	Golam Sarwar	Awami League
Bogra	Md. Mahmudul Hasan Khan	Awami League
Pabna	Motahar Hossain Talukdar	Awami League
Pabna	Abdur Rashid Tarkabagish	Awami League
Pabna	Abdul Momin Talukdar	Awami League
Pabna	Abu Sayeed	Awami League
Pabna	M Mansur Ali	Awami League
Pabna	Syed Haider Ali	Awami League
Pabna	Rowshanul Haque	Awami League
Pabna	Golam Hasnain	Awami League
Pabna	Abdur Rahman	Awami League
Pabna	Mohammad Rafiq	Awami League
Pabna	Ahmed Tafiz Uddin	Awami League
Pabna	Md. Mozammel Haque	Awami League
Pabna	Abdur Rob Boga Mia	Awami League
Rajshahi	Atowar Rahman Talukder	Awami League
Rajshahi	Azizar Rahman	Awami League
Rajshahi	Mohammad Baitullah	Awami League
Rajshahi	Khalid Ali Mia	Awami League
Rajshahi	Rais Uddin Ahmed	Awami League
Rajshahi	Abul Hasnat Muhammad Qamaruzzaman	Awami League
Rajshahi	Shah Muhammad Zafarullah	Awami League
Rajshahi	Sheikh Mubarak Hossain	Awami League
Rajshahi	Mainuddin Ahmed Manik	Awami League
Rajshahi	N. A. Hamidur Rahman	Awami League
Rajshahi	A. A. M. Mesbahul Haq	Awami League
Rajshahi	Md. Basirul Haque	Awami League
Rajshahi	Kazimdar Wasimuddin Ahmed	Awami League
Rajshahi	Ismail Hossain Chowdhury	Awami League
Rajshahi	Emaz Uddin Pramanik	Awami League
Rajshahi	Giasuddin Sardar	Awami League
Rajshahi	Md. Azizul Islam Khan	Awami League
Rajshahi	Abdul Hadi	Awami League
Rajshahi	Sardar Amjad Hossain	Awami League
Rajshahi	Md. Alauddin	Awami League
Rajshahi	Zillur Rahman	Awami League
Rajshahi	Shankar Gobind Chowdhury	Awami League
Rajshahi	Ashraful Islam Mia	Awami League
Kushtia	M Amir-ul Islam	Awami League
Kushtia	Azizur Rahman Akkas	Awami League
Kushtia	Sahiuddin Bishwas	Awami League
Kushtia	Badal Rashid	Awami League
Kushtia	Abdur Rouf Chowdhury	Awami League
Kushtia	Ahsan Ullah	Awami League
Kushtia	Mohammad Golam Kibria	Awami League
Kushtia	Mohammad Nurul Haque	Awami League
Kushtia	Ahsanul Haque	Awami League
Kushtia	Yunus Ali	Awami League
Jessore	Md. Kamruzzaman	Awami League
Jessore	Iqbal Anwar Islam	Awami League
Jessore	Subodh Kumar Mitra	Awami League
Jessore	Raushan Ali	Awami League
Jessore	Muhammad Sohrab Hossain	Awami League
Jessore	Khandaker Abdul Hafeez	Awami League
Jessore	Kazi Khademul Islam	Awami League
Jessore	A. B. M. Golam Majid	Awami League
Jessore	J. K. M. A. Aziz	Awami League
Jessore	Mohammad Moinuddin Miazi	Awami League
Jessore	Tabibar Rahman Sarder	Awami League
Jessore	Md. Abu Islam	Awami League
Jessore	Md. Nurul Islam	Awami League
Jessore	Shah Badiuzzaman	Awami League
Jessore	Mohammad Asaduzzaman	Awami League
Jessore	Syed Ator Ali	Awami League
Jessore	Shahid Ali Khan	Awami League
Jessore	S. M. Matiur Rahman	Awami League
Khulna	Abul Khair Sikder	Awami League
Khulna	Sheikh Abdul Aziz	Awami League
Khulna	Lutfar Rahman	Awami League
Khulna	M. A. Gafur	Awami League
Khulna	Mohammad Mohsin	Awami League
Khulna	Salahuddin Yusuf	Awami League
Khulna	Syed Kamal Bakht	Awami League
Khulna	Sheikh Ali Ahmed	Awami League
Khulna	Sheikh Abdur Rahman	Awami League
Khulna	Mir Shakawat Ali Daru	Awami League
Khulna	Abdul Latif Khan	Awami League
Khulna	Kuber Chandra Biswas	Awami League
Khulna	M. Mansur Ali	Awami League
Khulna	Enayet Ali Sana	Awami League
Khulna	Momen Uddin Ahmed	Awami League
Khulna	Fazlul Haque Sardar	Awami League
Khulna	Md. Khairul Alam	Awami League
Khulna	Mumtaz Ahmed Sardar	Awami League
Khulna	S. M. Alauddin	Awami League
Backergunge	Abdur Rab Serniabat	Awami League
Backergunge	Salehuddin Ahmed	Awami League
Backergunge	Nurul Islam Manzur	Awami League
Backergunge	Abdul Mannan Howlader	Awami League
Backergunge	Tofail Ahmed	Awami League
Backergunge	Enayet Hossain Khan	Awami League
Backergunge	Shamsul Haque	Awami League
Backergunge	Md. Nazrul Islam	Awami League
Backergunge	Motahar Uddin	Awami League
Backergunge	Riaz Ikram Chowdhury	Awami League
Backergunge	Mozammel Hossain	Awami League
Backergunge	Kabiruddin Ahmad	Awami League
Backergunge	A. K. S. Ismail Mia	Awami League
Backergunge	Md. Amir Hossain	Awami League
Backergunge	Fazlul Haque Talukdar	Awami League
Backergunge	Mohiuddin Ahmed	Awami League
Backergunge	A. K. S. Nurul Karim	Awami League
Backergunge	Harnath Bain	Independent
Backergunge	Abdul Karim Sardar	Awami League
Backergunge	Shah Mazharuddin	Awami League
Backergunge	Khitish Chandra Mondal	Awami League
Backergunge	Abdul Hai	Awami League
Backergunge	Nurul Islam	Awami League
Backergunge	Shawkatul Alam Saghir	Awami League
Patuakhali	Asmat Ali Sikder	Awami League
Patuakhali	Md. Rustam Ali Khan	Awami League
Patuakhali	Shahjada Abdul Malek Khan	Awami League
Patuakhali	A. K. M. Nurul Haque	Awami League
Patuakhali	Syed Md. Abul Hasem	Awami League
Patuakhali	Abdul Aziz Khandaker	Awami League
Patuakhali	Abdul Barek Mia	Awami League
Tangail	Abdul Mannan	Awami League
Tangail	Shaukat Ali Khan	Awami League
Tangail	Humayun Khalid	Awami League
Tangail	Hatem Ali Talukdar	Awami League
Tangail	Shamsur Rahman Khan Shahjahan	Awami League
Tangail	Nizamul Islam	Awami League
Tangail	Badiuzzaman Khan	Awami League
Tangail	Abdul Basit Siddiqui	Awami League
Tangail	Abdul Latif Siddiqui	Awami League
Tangail	Insan Ali Mukhtar	Awami League
Tangail	Mirza Tofazzal Hossain Mukul	Awami League
Tangail	Setab Ali Khan	Awami League
Tangail	Fazlur Rahman Faruque	Awami League
Mymensingh	Mohammad Abdus Samad	Awami League
Mymensingh	Karimuzzaman Talukder	Awami League
Mymensingh	Mohammad Abdul Hakim	Awami League
Mymensingh	Anisur Rahman	Awami League
Mymensingh	Abdul Hakim Sarkar	Awami League
Mymensingh	AK Mosharraf Hossain Akand	Awami League
Mymensingh	Ibrahim Sarkar	Awami League
Mymensingh	Syed Abdus Sultan	Awami League
Mymensingh	ANM Nazrul Islam	Awami League
Mymensingh	Mohammad Shamsul Huda	Awami League
Mymensingh	Sadir Uddin Ahmed	Awami League
Mymensingh	Abdul Momin Talukdar	Awami League
Mymensingh	Zubed Ali	Awami League
Mymensingh	Asaduzzaman Khan	Awami League
Mymensingh	Zillur Rahman	Awami League
Mymensingh	Syed Nazrul Islam	Awami League
Mymensingh	Mohammad Abdul Hamid	Awami League
Mymensingh	Md. Ashraf Hossain	Awami League
Mymensingh	Rashed Mosharraf	Awami League
Mymensingh	Abdul Hai	Awami League
Mymensingh	Abdul Malek	Awami League
Mymensingh	Nizamuddin Ahmad	Awami League
Mymensingh	Nasiruzzaman Khan	Awami League
Mymensingh	Md. Abdul Halim	Awami League
Mymensingh	Kudratullah Mandal	Awami League
Mymensingh	Shamsul Haque	Awami League
Mymensingh	Hatem Ali Mia	Awami League
Mymensingh	Md. Enam Ali Mia	Awami League
Mymensingh	Moslem Uddin	Awami League
Mymensingh	Abul Mansur Ahmad	Awami League
Mymensingh	Mostafa MA Matin	Awami League
Mymensingh	Md. Abdul Hashem	Awami League
Mymensingh	Abdul Majid Tara Mia	Awami League
Mymensingh	Nazmul Huda	Awami League
Mymensingh	Akhlakul Hossain Ahmed	Awami League
Mymensingh	Abbas Ali Khan	Awami League
Mymensingh	Hadith Uddin Chowdhury	Awami League
Mymensingh	Abdul Khaleq	Awami League
Mymensingh	A. K. M. Shamsul Haque	Awami League
Mymensingh	Mostafizur Rahman Khan	Awami League
Mymensingh	MA Sattar	Awami League
Mymensingh	MA Quddus	Awami League
Mymensingh	Md. Abdul Kadir	Awami League
Mymensingh	Manzoor Ahmad Bachchu	Awami League
Faridpur	Syed Qumrul Islam Saleh Uddin	Awami League
Faridpur	KM Obaidur Rahman	Awami League
Faridpur	Shamsuddin Mollah	Awami League
Faridpur	Mohammad Abul Khayer	Awami League
Faridpur	Mollah Jalaluddin Ahmed	Awami League
Faridpur	Abidur Reza Khan	Awami League
Faridpur	M. A. Kasem	Awami League
Faridpur	Moslem Uddin Mridha	Awami League
Faridpur	Gour Chandra Bala	Awami League
Faridpur	Aftab Uddin Mollah	Awami League
Faridpur	Imam Uddin Ahmad	Awami League
Faridpur	Mosharraf Hossain	Awami League
Faridpur	A. Y. Amin Uddin Ahmad	Awami League
Faridpur	Syed Haider Hossain	Awami League
Faridpur	Kazi Abdur Rashid	Awami League
Faridpur	Akhter Mia	Awami League
Faridpur	Sheikh Mosharraf Hossain	Awami League
Faridpur	Satish Chandra Halder	Awami League
Faridpur	Ilias Ahmed Chowdhury	Awami League
Faridpur	Asmat Ali Khan	Awami League
Faridpur	Aminul Islam Danesh Mia	Awami League
Faridpur	Motiur Rahman	Awami League
Faridpur	Ali Ahmed Khan	Awami League
Faridpur	Abdur Razzak	Awami League
Faridpur	Phani Bhushan Majumder	Awami League
Dacca	Moslem Uddin Khan	Awami League
Dacca	Khandaker Nurul Islam	Awami League
Dacca	Shamsul Haq	Awami League
Dacca	Tajuddin Ahmad	Awami League
Dacca	Ashraf Ali Chowdhury	Awami League
Dacca	Sheikh Mujibur Rahman	Awami League
Dacca	Kamal Hossain	Awami League
Dacca	Fazlur Rahman Bhuiyan	Awami League
Dacca	Aftab Uddin Bhuiyan	Awami League
Dacca	Abdur Razzak Bhuiyan	Awami League
Dacca	Shahar Ali Mian	Awami League
Dacca	AKM Samsuzzoha	Awami League
Dacca	Kafiluddin Chowdhury	Awami League
Dacca	Abdul Karim Bepari	Awami League
Dacca	Mohammad Siddiqur Rahman	Awami League
Dacca	Akhtaruddin Biswas	Awami League
Dacca	Khondaker Mazharul Haque	Awami League
Dacca	Mir Abul Khayer	Awami League
Dacca	Shah Moazzem Hossain	Awami League
Dacca	Jamal Uddin Chowdhury	Awami League
Dacca	Md. Shamsul Haque Mia	Awami League
Dacca	K. M. Shamsul Huda	Awami League
Dacca	Rafiuddin Ahmed	Awami League
Dacca	Abu Md. Subid Ali	Awami League
Dacca	Hamidur Rahman	Awami League
Dacca	M Sirajul Islam	Awami League
Dacca	Gazi Golam Mostafa	Awami League
Dacca	Mosharraf Hossain	Awami League
Dacca	Hedayetul Islam	Awami League
Dacca	Shafiruddin	Awami League
Dacca	Mohammad Anwar Jung Talukdar	Awami League
Dacca	Md. Jamal Uddin	Awami League
Dacca	Faqueer Shahabuddin Ahmad	Awami League
Dacca	Moyez Uddin	Awami League
Dacca	Gazi Fazlur Rahman	Awami League
Dacca	Shamsuddin Bhuiyan	Awami League
Dacca	Rajiuddin Ahmed Raju	Awami League
Dacca	Moslehuddin Bhuiyan	Awami League
Dacca	Kazi Sahabuddin Ahmed	Awami League
Dacca	Sadat Ali Sikder	Awami League
Dacca	Afzal Hossain	Awami League
Dacca	S. A. Sattar Bhuiyan	Awami League
Sylhet	Mostafa Ali	Awami League
Sylhet	Mohammad Abdur Rab	Awami League
Sylhet	Latifur Rahman Chowdhury	Awami League
Sylhet	Mohammad Ilias	Awami League
Sylhet	Abdul Muntaquim Chaudhury	Awami League
Sylhet	M. A. G. Osmani	Awami League
Sylhet	Abdur Rahim	Awami League
Sylhet	Dewan Farid Gazi	Awami League
Sylhet	Abdul Hoque	Awami League
Sylhet	Abdus Samad Azad	Awami League
Sylhet	D. M. H Obaidur Raza Chowdhury	Awami League
Sylhet	Abdul Hakeem Chowdhury	Awami League
Sylhet	Suranjit Sengupta	National Awami Party (Muzaffar)
Sylhet	Abdur Raees	Awami League
Sylhet	Shamsu Mia Chowdhury	Awami League
Sylhet	M. A. Zahur	Awami League
Sylhet	Lutfur Rahman	Awami League
Sylhet	Abdul Malik	Awami League
Sylhet	Habibur Rahman	Awami League
Sylhet	MA Latif	Awami League
Sylhet	Taymus Alam	Awami League
Sylhet	Ali Sarwar Khan	Awami League
Sylhet	Toabur Rahim	Awami League
Sylhet	Altafur Rahman Chowdhury	Awami League
Sylhet	Azizur Rahman	Awami League
Sylhet	Enamul Haque Mostafa Shahid	Awami League
Sylhet	Asad Ali	Awami League
Sylhet	Gopal Krishna Maharatna	Awami League
Sylhet	Abdul Aziz Chowdhury	Independent
Comilla	Taheruddin Thakur	Awami League
Comilla	Ali Azam	Awami League
Comilla	Dewan Abul Abbas	Awami League
Comilla	Sirajul Haque	Awami League
Comilla	Mohammad Khorshed Alam	Awami League
Comilla	Kazi Zahirul Qayyum	Awami League
Comilla	Ahmed Khaleque	Awami League
Comilla	Khondaker Mostaq Ahmad	Awami League
Comilla	Md Abul Hashem	Awami League
Comilla	Muhammad Shujat Ali	Awami League
Comilla	Abdul Awal	Awami League
Comilla	Habibur Rahman	Awami League
Comilla	Md. Wali Ullah	Awami League
Comilla	Mizanur Rahman Chowdhury	Awami League
Comilla	Mozammel Haque	Awami League
Comilla	Syed Serajul Islam	Awami League
Comilla	Lutful Hai Sachchu	Awami League
Comilla	Syed Emdadul Bari	Awami League
Comilla	Ahmed Ali	Awami League
Comilla	Kazi Akbar Uddin Mohammad Siddique	Awami League
Comilla	Muzaffar Ali	Awami League
Comilla	Abdur Rashid	Awami League
Comilla	Romizuddin Ahmed	Independent
Comilla	Abdul Aziz Khan	Awami League
Comilla	Abdul Hakim	Awami League
Comilla	Amir Hossain	Awami League
Comilla	Md. Abdul Malek	Awami League
Comilla	Ali Akbar Majumder	Awami League
Comilla	Mir Hossain Chowdhury	Awami League
Comilla	Abdul Awal	Awami League
Comilla	Jalal Ahmed	Awami League
Comilla	Sikandar Ali	Awami League
Comilla	Abdus Sattar	Awami League
Comilla	A. B. Siddique	Awami League
Comilla	Golam Morshed Farooqi	Awami League
Comilla	Abdul Karim Bepari	Awami League
Comilla	Sirajul Islam Patwari	Awami League
Comilla	Raja Mia	Awami League
Noakhali	Khawaja Ahmed	Awami League
Noakhali	Nurul Haque	Awami League
Noakhali	Abdul Malek Ukil	Awami League
Noakhali	Delwar Hossain	Awami League
Noakhali	Khaled Mohammad Ali	Awami League
Noakhali	Md. Hanif	Awami League
Noakhali	Abdur Rashid	Awami League
Noakhali	A. F. K. Safdar	Awami League
Noakhali	Khairuddin Ahmed	Awami League
Noakhali	A. B. M. Taleb Ali	Awami League
Noakhali	Abu Naser Chowdhury	Awami League
Noakhali	Abdus Sobhan	Awami League
Noakhali	Rafiqullah Mia	Awami League
Noakhali	Nurul Ahmed Chowdhury	Awami League
Noakhali	Mohammad Mohammadullah	Awami League
Noakhali	A. M. M. Bismillah Mia	Awami League
Noakhali	Md. Abdul Mohaimen	Awami League
Noakhali	Shahid Uddin Iskander	Awami League
Noakhali	Sirajul Islam	Awami League
Noakhali	Amirul Islam Kalam	Independent
Chittagong	Mustafizur Rahman Siddiqi	Awami League
Chittagong	M. A. Majid	Awami League
Chittagong	Mohammad Idris Shakur	Awami League
Chittagong	Syed Fazlul Haque	Awami League
Chittagong	Mohammad Khaled	Awami League
Chittagong	Nurul Islam Chowdhury	Awami League
Chittagong	Ataur Rahman Khan Kaiser	Awami League
Chittagong	Abu Saleh Mia	Awami League
Chittagong	Noor Ahmed Sawdagar	Awami League
Chittagong	Mosharraf Hossain	Awami League
Chittagong	M. Obaidul Huq	Awami League
Chittagong	Abdul Wahab	Awami League
Chittagong	Abdullah Al Harun Chowdhury	Awami League
Chittagong	Md. Ishak	Awami League
Chittagong	Zahur Ahmad Chowdhury	Awami League
Chittagong	M. A. Manan	Awami League
Chittagong	Abul Kashem	Awami League
Chittagong	Sultan Ahmed Chowdhury	Awami League
Chittagong	B. M. Faizur Rahman	Awami League
Chittagong	Sirajul Islam Chowdhury	Awami League
Chittagong	Jahirul Islam	Awami League
Chittagong	Mostaq Ahmad Chowdhury	Awami League
Chittagong	Osman Sarwar Alam Chowdhury	Awami League
Chittagong Hill Tracts	Manabendra Narayan Larma	Independent
Chittagong Hill Tracts	Chaithoai Roaza	Independent

== Women members ==
The following is a list of members nominated to the reserved women's seats:

Region	Member	Party
Rangpur	Taslima Abed	Awami League
Rajshahi	Badrunnessa Ahmed	Awami League
Khulna	Razia Banu	Awami League
Mymensingh	Rafia Akhtar Dolly	Awami League
Dacca	Nurjahan Murshid	Awami League
Sylhet	Momtaz Begum	Awami League
Chittagong	Syeda Sajeda Chowdhury	Awami League

== Expelled members ==
The following is a list of members expelled for violating party discipline and directives:

Region	Member	Party
Rangpur	Mohammad Abu Solaiman Mondal	Awami League
Bogra	Mohammad Habibur Rahman	Awami League
Bogra	Zahidur Rahman	Awami League
Bogra	Taherul Islam Khan	Awami League
Pabna	Syed Hossain Mansur	Awami League
Pabna	AKM Mahbubul Islam	Awami League
Pabna	K. B. M. Abu Hena	Awami League
Rajshahi	Riazuddin Ahmed	Awami League
Rajshahi	Md. Abdus Salam	Awami League
Kushtia	Zahurul Haque	Awami League
Jessore	Mosharraf Hossain	Awami League
Khulna	Muhammad Abdul Ghaffar	Awami League
Khulna	Mohammad Saeed	Awami League
Khulna	Habibur Rahman Khan	Awami League
Bakerganj	A. K. Faezul Huq	Awami League
Bakerganj	Mosharraf Hossain Shahjahan	Awami League
Bakerganj	Mohammad Abdul Barek	Awami League
Bakerganj	Azahar Uddin Ahmed	Awami League
Patuakhali	Golam Ahad Chowdhury	Awami League
Patuakhali	Abdul Hadi Talukdar	Awami League
Patuakhali	Mujibur Rahman Talukdar	Awami League
Tangail	Md. Shamsuddin Ahmed	Awami League
Mymensingh	Akhtaruzzaman	Awami League
Mymensingh	Syed Badruzzaman	Awami League
Mymensingh	Khandakar Abdul Malek Shahidullah	Awami League
Faridpur	A.B.M. Nurul Islam	Awami League
Faridpur	Amjad Hossain Khan	Awami League
Faridpur	Adeluddin Ahmad	Awami League
Faridpur	Kazi Hedayet Hossain	Awami League
Dacca	Mohammad Nurul Islam	Awami League
Dacca	Sheikh Zahiruddin	Awami League
Dacca	Abdul Hakim	Awami League
Dacca	Sajid Ali Mia Mukhtar	Awami League
Sylhet	Abul Hashem	Awami League
Sylhet	Masud Ahmed Chowdhury	Awami League
Sylhet	Kazi Sirajuddin Ahmad	Awami League
Comilla	Golam Mohiuddin Ahmed	Awami League
Comilla	Mohammad Hashem	Awami League
Noakhali	Obaidullah Majumdar	Awami League
Noakhali	M. Shakhawat Ullah	Awami League
Chittagong	Shamsul Haque	Awami League
Chittagong	Mirza Abu Mansur	Awami League
Chittagong	Akhtaruzzaman Chowdhury Babu	Awami League

== See also ==
- List of members of the 5th National Assembly of Pakistan
