= 1970 East Pakistan Provincial Assembly election =

- 17 December 1970

300 of the 310 seat in the East Pakistan Provincial Assembly 156 seats needed for a majority
- Registered: 29,479,386
- Turnout: 57.68%
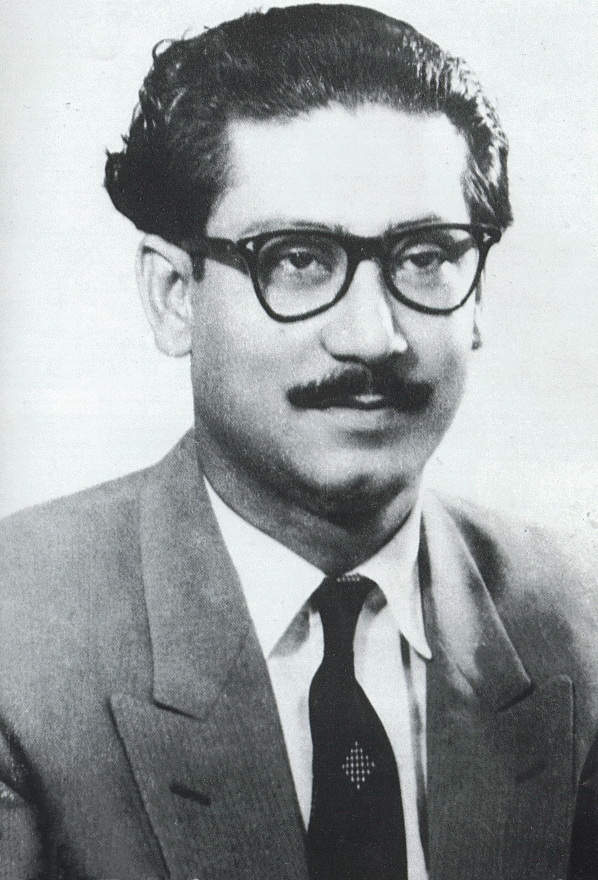

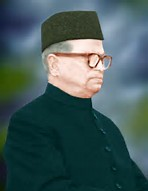
| | First party | Second party |
|---|---|---|
| Leader | Sheikh Mujibur Rahman | Nurul Amin |
| Party | AL | PDP |
| Last election | 143 | New party |
| Seats won | 288 | 2 |
| Seat change | ▲145 | ▲2 |
Governor before election
V/Adm S. M. Ahsan
Navy
President of Provisional Government-elect
Sheikh Mujibur Rahman
AL

Provincial elections were held in East Pakistan on 17 December 1970, ten days after general elections in Pakistan. A total of 1,850 candidates ran for the 300 seats in the East Pakistan Provincial Assembly. The result was a landslide victory for the All-Pakistan Awami League, which won 288 of the 300 seats. This was the last provincial election in East Pakistan.

== Background ==
In the previous provincial election in 1954, held in the backdrop of the Bengali language movement, the Awami League, Krishak Sramik Party and other smaller parties formed an alliance called United Front (Jukto Front). The Jukto Front won a landslide victory by winning 223 of the 309 seats. The Muslim League, once the most popular party in the province, had its worst-ever defeat, with many provincial ministers, including the chief minister of East Bengal, losing their seats.

In 1958, the military takeover by Field Marshal Ayub Khan overthrew all federal and provincial governments of Pakistan.

Sheikh Mujibur Rahman became the leader of the Awami League in 1963 and became the strongest supporter of lifting martial law and restoring democracy. In the 1965 Presidential Election, Sheikh Mujibur Rahman openly supported and launched campaign along with his party for Fatima Jinnah. Fatima Jinnah gained more votes in East Pakistan than West Pakistan.

On 18 March 1966, Sheikh Mujibur Rahman placed Six-point movement during a conference held in Lahore which demanded more autonomy for East Pakistan. It was rejected by then political parties of both wings but got huge support from the people of East Bengal. In April 1966, Sheikh Mujibur Rahman demanded to conduct a nationwide referendum on his six-point movement and said that military establishment is exploiting East Pakistan by using all export revenue of jute to feed the army.

He was arrested in April 1966 in Jessore but was bailed out soon. He was again arrested on the orders of Ayub Khan in May and sent to Sylhet jail where he was charged in the Agartala Conspiracy case along with 28 East Bengali military and government officials. After huge protests against the arrest of Sheikh Mujibur Rahman across East Pakistan, all cases were withdrawn and he was released.

A month before elections the deadliest tropical storm hit East Bengal which claimed lives of at least half a million people. Poor response from then government of Pakistan skyrocketed popularity of Awami League. President Yahya Khan was strongly criticized by international media due to its poor disaster governance.

== Electoral system ==
The 310 members of the Provincial Assembly consist of 300 directly elected seats using first-past-the-post voting in single-member constituencies, and an additional 10 seats reserved for women. The reserved seats are selected by the elected constituency members via the single transferable vote. Each parliament sits for a five-year term.

== Results ==
The All-Pakistan Awami League won a landslide victory of 288 seats. After claiming all ten seats reserved for women, it held 298 seats.

| Party | Votes | % | Seats | | |
| Party | Votes | % | General | Women | Total |
|---|---|---|---|---|---|
| All-Pakistan Awami League | | | 288 | 10 | 298 |
| Pakistan Democratic Party | | | 2 | 0 | 2 |
| National Awami Party (Wali) | | | 1 | 0 | 1 |
| Jamaat-e-Islami Pakistan | | | 1 | 0 | 1 |
| Nizam-e-Islam Party | | | 1 | 0 | 1 |
| Other parties and independents | | | 7 | 0 | 7 |
| Total | | | 300 | 10 | 310 |
| Registered voters/turnout | 29,479,386 | – | | | |
Source: Baxter, Jhotpot Info, Banglapedia

=== Elected members ===
| Division | District | Constituency | Member | Party |
|---|---|---|---|---|
| Rajshahi | Rangpur | Rangpur-1 | Abdur Rahman Chaudhuri | Awami League |
| Rajshahi | Rangpur | Rangpur-2 | Mohammad Amin | Awami League |
| Rajshahi | Rangpur | Rangpur-3 | Azharul Islam | Awami League |
| Rajshahi | Rangpur | Rangpur-4 | Dr. Zikrul Haq | Awami League |
| Rajshahi | Rangpur | Rangpur-5 | Abid Ali | Awami League |
| Rajshahi | Rangpur | Rangpur-6 | Karim Uddin Ahmed | Awami League |
| Rajshahi | Rangpur | Rangpur-7 | Elahi Baksh Sarkar | Awami League |
| Rajshahi | Rangpur | Rangpur-8 | Mohammad Siddique Hossain | Awami League |
| Rajshahi | Rangpur | Rangpur-9 | Shah Abdur Razzak | Awami League |
| Rajshahi | Rangpur | Rangpur-10 | Mohammad Hamiduzzaman Sarkar | Awami League |
| Rajshahi | Rangpur | Rangpur-11 | Mohammad Gazi Rahman | Awami League |
| Rajshahi | Rangpur | Rangpur-12 | Shamsul Haq Chowdhury | Awami League |
| Rajshahi | Rangpur | Rangpur-13 | Abdul Hakim | Awami League |
| Rajshahi | Rangpur | Rangpur-14 | Abul Hossain | Awami League |
| Rajshahi | Rangpur | Rangpur-15 | Abdullah Suhrawardi | Awami League |
| Rajshahi | Rangpur | Rangpur-16 | Nurul Islam | Awami League |
| Rajshahi | Rangpur | Rangpur-17 | Shamsul Hossain | Awami League |
| Rajshahi | Rangpur | Rangpur-18 | Mohammad Abu Taleb Mia | Awami League |
| Rajshahi | Rangpur | Rangpur-19 | Mohammad Waliur Rahman | Awami League |
| Rajshahi | Rangpur | Rangpur-20 | Dr. Mafizur Rahman | Awami League |
| Rajshahi | Rangpur | Rangpur-21 | Jamalur Rahman Pradhan | Awami League |
| Rajshahi | Rangpur | Rangpur-22 | Azizur Rahman | Awami League |
| Rajshahi | Dinajpur | Dinajpur-1 | Kamruddin Ahmed | Awami League |
| Rajshahi | Dinajpur | Dinajpur-2 | Advocate Sirajul Islam | Awami League |
| Rajshahi | Dinajpur | Dinajpur-3 | Mohammad Fazlul Karim | Awami League |
| Rajshahi | Dinajpur | Dinajpur-4 | Ekramul Haq | Awami League |
| Rajshahi | Dinajpur | Dinajpur-5 | Mohammad Golam Rahman | Awami League |
| Rajshahi | Dinajpur | Dinajpur-6 | S. M. Yusuf | Awami League |
| Rajshahi | Dinajpur | Dinajpur-7 | Mohammad Abdur Rahim | Awami League |
| Rajshahi | Dinajpur | Dinajpur-8 | Mohammad Khatibur Rahman | Awami League |
| Rajshahi | Dinajpur | Dinajpur-9 | Sadar Mosharraf Hossain | Awami League |
| Rajshahi | Dinajpur | Dinajpur-10 | Kazi Abdul Majid Chaudhuri | Awami League |
| Rajshahi | Bogra | Bogra-1 | Saidur Rahman | Awami League |
| Rajshahi | Bogra | Bogra-2 | Qasimuddin Ahmed | Awami League |
| Rajshahi | Bogra | Bogra-3 | Sheikh Abul Hasnat Chaudhuri | Awami League |
| Rajshahi | Bogra | Bogra-4 | Mozaffar Hossain | Awami League |
| Rajshahi | Bogra | Bogra-5 | Hassain Ali Sarkar | Awami League |
| Rajshahi | Bogra | Bogra-6 | Taherul Islam Khan | Awami League |
| Rajshahi | Bogra | Bogra-7 | Dr. Mohammad Golam Sarwar | Awami League |
| Rajshahi | Bogra | Bogra-8 | Mohammad Abdur Rahman Fakir | Jamaat-e-Islami |
| Rajshahi | Bogra | Bogra-9 | Mohammad Mahmudul Hassan Khan | Awami League |
| Rajshahi | Rajshahi | Rajshahi-1 | Dr. Moinuddin Ahmad Montu | Awami League |
| Rajshahi | Rajshahi | Rajshahi-2 | N. A. Hamidur Rahman | Awami League |
| Rajshahi | Rajshahi | Rajshahi-3 | Dr. A. A. Muhammad Mesbahul Haq Bacchu | Awami League |
| Rajshahi | Rajshahi | Rajshahi-4 | Dr. Mohammad Bashirul Haq | Awami League |
| Rajshahi | Rajshahi | Rajshahi-5 | Kazimdar Wasimuddin Ahmed | Awami League |
| Rajshahi | Rajshahi | Rajshahi-6 | Captain Ismail Hossain Chaudhuri | Awami League |
| Rajshahi | Rajshahi | Rajshahi-7 | Emaz Uddin Pramanik | Awami League |
| Rajshahi | Rajshahi | Rajshahi-8 | Ghiyasuddin Sardar | Awami League |
| Rajshahi | Rajshahi | Rajshahi-9 | Mohammad Azizul Islam Khan | Awami League |
| Rajshahi | Rajshahi | Rajshahi-10 | Riyazuddin Ahmed | Awami League |
| Rajshahi | Rajshahi | Rajshahi-11 | AHM Abdul Hadi | Awami League |
| Rajshahi | Rajshahi | Rajshahi-12 | Sardar Amjad Hossain | Awami League |
| Rajshahi | Rajshahi | Rajshahi-13 | Dr. Mohammad Alauddin | Awami League |
| Rajshahi | Rajshahi | Rajshahi-14 | Zillur Rahman | Awami League |
| Rajshahi | Rajshahi | Rajshahi-15 | Shankar Gobinda Chaudhuri | Awami League |
| Rajshahi | Rajshahi | Rajshahi-16 | Ashraful Islam Mia | Awami League |
| Rajshahi | Rajshahi | Rajshahi-17 | Mohammad Abdus Salam | Awami League |
| Rajshahi | Pabna | Pabna-1 | M. Mansur Ali | Awami League |
| Rajshahi | Pabna | Pabna-2 | Syed Hyder Ali | Awami League |
| Rajshahi | Pabna | Pabna-3 | Raushanul Haque Moti Mia | Awami League |
| Rajshahi | Pabna | Pabna-4 | Golam Hasnayen | Awami League |
| Rajshahi | Pabna | Pabna-5 | K. B. M. Abu Hena | Awami League |
| Rajshahi | Pabna | Pabna-6 | A. B. M. Mahbulul Islam | Awami League |
| Rajshahi | Pabna | Pabna-7 | Abdur Rahman | Awami League |
| Rajshahi | Pabna | Pabna-8 | Mohammad Rafiq | Awami League |
| Rajshahi | Pabna | Pabna-9 | Ahmed Tafiz Uddin | Awami League |
| Rajshahi | Pabna | Pabna-10 | Mohammad Mozammel Haq | Awami League |
| Rajshahi | Pabna | Pabna-11 | Amin Uddin | Awami League |
| Rajshahi | Pabna | Pabna-12 | Mohammad Abdur Rab | Awami League |
| Khulna | Kushtia | Kushtia-1 | Zahrul Haq | Awami League |
| Khulna | Kushtia | Kushtia-2 | Abdur Rauf Chowdhury | Awami League |
| Khulna | Kushtia | Kushtia-3 | Ahsan Ullah | Awami League |
| Khulna | Kushtia | Kushtia-4 | Golam Kibria | Awami League |
| Khulna | Kushtia | Kushtia-5 | Nurul Haq | Awami League |
| Khulna | Kushtia | Kushtia-6 | Dr. Ahsanul Haq | Awami League |
| Khulna | Kushtia | Kushtia-7 | Yunus Ali | Awami League |
| Khulna | Jessore | Jessore-1 | Kazi Khademul Islam | Awami League |
| Khulna | Jessore | Jessore-2 | A. B. M. Golam Majid | Awami League |
| Khulna | Jessore | Jessore-3 | JKMA Aziz | Awami League |
| Khulna | Jessore | Jessore-4 | Mohammad Moinuddin Miazi | Awami League |
| Khulna | Jessore | Jessore-5 | Tabibar Rahman Sarder | Awami League |
| Khulna | Jessore | Jessore-6 | Mohammad Abul Islam | Awami League |
| Khulna | Jessore | Jessore-7 | Mohammad Nurul Islam | Awami League |
| Khulna | Jessore | Jessore-8 | Shah Hadiizzzaman | Awami League |
| Khulna | Jessore | Jessore-9 | Mohammad Mosharraf Hossain | Awami League |
| Khulna | Jessore | Jessore-10 | Mohammad Asaduzzaman | Awami League |
| Khulna | Jessore | Jessore-11 | Syed Ator Ali | Awami League |
| Khulna | Jessore | Jessore-12 | Shahid Ali Khan | Awami League |
| Khulna | Jessore | Jessore-13 | S. M. Matiur Rahman | Awami League |
| Khulna | Khulna | Khulna-1 | Sheikh Ali Ahmed | Awami League |
| Khulna | Khulna | Khulna-2 | Abdur Rahman Sheikh | Awami League |
| Khulna | Khulna | Khulna-3 | Mir Shaukat Ali | Awami League |
| Khulna | Khulna | Khulna-4 | Abdul Latif Khan | Awami League |
| Khulna | Khulna | Khulna-5 | Kuber Chandra Biswas | Awami League |
| Khulna | Khulna | Khulna-6 | Habibur Rahman Khan | Awami League |
| Khulna | Khulna | Khulna-7 | Dr. Mansur Ali | Awami League |
| Khulna | Khulna | Khulna-8 | Enayet Ali Sana | Awami League |
| Khulna | Khulna | Khulna-9 | Momen Uddin Ahmed | Awami League |
| Khulna | Khulna | Khulna-10 | Mohammad Syed | Awami League |
| Khulna | Khulna | Khulna-11 | Fazlul Haq Sardar | Awami League |
| Khulna | Khulna | Khulna-12 | Mohammad Khairul Alam | Awami League |
| Khulna | Khulna | Khulna-13 | Mamtaz Ahmed Sardar | Awami League |
| Khulna | Khulna | Khulna-14 | S. M. Alauddin | Awami League |
| Khulna | Patuakhali | Patuakhali-1 | Mohammad Rostam Ali Khan | Awami League |
| Khulna | Patuakhali | Patuakhali-2 | Shahzada Abdul Malek Khan | Awami League |
| Khulna | Patuakhali | Patuakhali-3 | A. K. M. Nurul Haq | Awami League |
| Khulna | Patuakhali | Patuakhali-4 | Mujibur Rahman Talukder | Awami League |
| Khulna | Patuakhali | Patuakhali-5 | Syed Mohammed Abul Hashem | Awami League |
| Khulna | Patuakhali | Patuakhali-6 | Abdul Aziz Khondokar | Awami League |
| Khulna | Patuakhali | Patuakhali-7 | Abdul Barek Mia | Awami League |
| Khulna | Bakerganj | Bakerganj-1 | Mosharraf Hossain Shahjahan | Awami League |
| Khulna | Bakerganj | Bakerganj-2 | Mohammad Nazrul Islam | Awami League |
| Khulna | Bakerganj | Bakerganj-3 | Mohammad Motahar Uddin | Awami League |
| Khulna | Bakerganj | Bakerganj-4 | Reza-e-Karim Chowdhury | Awami League |
| Khulna | Bakerganj | Bakerganj-5 | Mozammel Hossain | Awami League |
| Khulna | Bakerganj | Bakerganj-6 | Kabir Uddin Ahmed | Awami League |
| Khulna | Bakerganj | Bakerganj-7 | A. K. S. Ismail Mia | Awami League |
| Khulna | Bakerganj | Bakerganj-8 | Mohammad Amir Hossain | Awami League |
| Khulna | Bakerganj | Bakerganj-9 | Fazlul Haque Talukdar | Awami League |
| Khulna | Bakerganj | Bakerganj-10 | Mohiuddin Ahmed | Awami League |
| Khulna | Bakerganj | Bakerganj-11 | AKM Nurul Karim Khair | Awami League |
| Khulna | Bakerganj | Bakerganj-12 | Haranath Byne | Independent politician |
| Khulna | Bakerganj | Bakerganj-13 | Abdul Karim Sardar | Awami League |
| Khulna | Bakerganj | Bakerganj-14 | Dr. Shah Mazahar Uddin | Awami League |
| Khulna | Bakerganj | Bakerganj-15 | Khitish Chandra Mondal | Awami League |
| Khulna | Bakerganj | Bakerganj-16 | Dr. Abdul Hye | Awami League |
| Khulna | Bakerganj | Bakerganj-17 | Nurul Islam Bhandari | Awami League |
| Khulna | Bakerganj | Bakerganj-18 | Saogatul Alam Sagir | Awami League |
| Dacca | Tangail | Tangail-1 | Dr. Sheikh Nizamul Islam | Awami League |
| Dacca | Tangail | Tangail-2 | Badiuzzaman Khan | Awami League |
| Dacca | Tangail | Tangail-3 | M.A. Bashid Siddiqi | Awami League |
| Dacca | Tangail | Tangail-4 | Abdul Latif Siddiqui | Awami League |
| Dacca | Tangail | Tangail-5 | Mohammad Insan Ali Mokhtar | Awami League |
| Dacca | Tangail | Tangail-6 | Mirza Tofazzal Hossain Mukul | Awami League |
| Dacca | Tangail | Tangail-7 | Sitab Ali Khan | Awami League |
| Dacca | Tangail | Tangail-8 | Fazlur Rahman Khan | Awami League |
| Dacca | Tangail | Tangail-9 | Mohammad Shamshuddin Ahmed | Awami League |
| Dacca | Mymensingh | Mymensingh-1 | Mohammad Ashraf Hossain | Awami League |
| Dacca | Mymensingh | Mymensingh-2 | Mohammad Rashed Mosharraf | Awami League |
| Dacca | Mymensingh | Mymensingh-3 | Mohammad Abdul Hyee | Awami League |
| Dacca | Mymensingh | Mymensingh-4 | Abdul Malek | Awami League |
| Dacca | Mymensingh | Mymensingh-5 | Akhtaruzzaman | Awami League |
| Dacca | Mymensingh | Mymensingh-6 | Nizam Uddin Ahmed | Awami League |
| Dacca | Mymensingh | Mymensingh-7 | Dr. Nasiruzzaman Khan | Awami League |
| Dacca | Mymensingh | Mymensingh-8 | Mohammad Abdul Halim | Awami League |
| Dacca | Mymensingh | Mymensingh-9 | Kudrut Ullah | Awami League |
| Dacca | Mymensingh | Mymensingh-10 | Shamshul Haq | Awami League |
| Dacca | Mymensingh | Mymensingh-11 | Hatem Ali Mia | Awami League |
| Dacca | Mymensingh | Mymensingh-12 | Mohammad Abdul Matin Bhuiyan | Pakistan Democratic Party |
| Dacca | Mymensingh | Mymensingh-13 | A.K. Mosharraf Hossain | Pakistan Democratic Party |
| Dacca | Mymensingh | Mymensingh-14 | Mohammad Inam Ali Mia | Awami League |
| Dacca | Mymensingh | Mymensingh-15 | Khondokar Abdul Malek Shahidullah | Awami League |
| Dacca | Mymensingh | Mymensingh-16 | Mohammad Muslim Uddin | Awami League |
| Dacca | Mymensingh | Mymensingh-17 | Abul Mansur Ahmed | Awami League |
| Dacca | Mymensingh | Mymensingh-18 | Mostafa MA Matin | Awami League |
| Dacca | Mymensingh | Mymensingh-19 | Mohammad Abul Hashem | Awami League |
| Dacca | Mymensingh | Mymensingh-20 | Abdul Majid Tara Mia | Awami League |
| Dacca | Mymensingh | Mymensingh-21 | Najmul Huda | Awami League |
| Dacca | Mymensingh | Mymensingh-22 | Dr. Akhlakul Hossain Ahmed | Awami League |
| Dacca | Mymensingh | Mymensingh-23 | Abbas Ali Khan | Awami League |
| Dacca | Mymensingh | Mymensingh-24 | Hafiz Uddin Chaudhuri | Awami League |
| Dacca | Mymensingh | Mymensingh-25 | Abdul Khaleq | Awami League |
| Dacca | Mymensingh | Mymensingh-26 | A. K. M. Shamshul Haq | Awami League |
| Dacca | Mymensingh | Mymensingh-27 | Mustafizur Rahman Khan | Awami League |
| Dacca | Mymensingh | Mymensingh-28 | M.A. Sattar | Awami League |
| Dacca | Mymensingh | Mymensingh-29 | Mohammad Abdul Quddus | Awami League |
| Dacca | Mymensingh | Mymensingh-30 | Mohammad Abdul Qader | Awami League |
| Dacca | Mymensingh | Mymensingh-31 | Manzur Ahmed | Awami League |
| Dacca | Mymensingh | Mymensingh-32 | Syed Badruzzaman | Awami League |
| Dacca | Dacca | Dhaka-1 | Mohammad Siddiqur Rahman | Awami League |
| Dacca | Dacca | Dhaka-2 | Akhtaruddin Biswas | Awami League |
| Dacca | Dacca | Dhaka-3 | Khondokar Mazharul Haq | Awami League |
| Dacca | Dacca | Dhaka-4 | Mir Abul Khayer | Awami League |
| Dacca | Dacca | Dhaka-5 | Shah Moazzem Hossain | Awami League |
| Dacca | Dacca | Dhaka-6 | Jamal Uddin Chaudhuri | Awami League |
| Dacca | Dacca | Dhaka-7 | Mohammad Shamshul Haq Mia | Awami League |
| Dacca | Dacca | Dhaka-8 | K. M. Shamsul Huda | Awami League |
| Dacca | Dacca | Dhaka-9 | Rafiuddin Ahmed | Awami League |
| Dacca | Dacca | Dhaka-10 | Abu Mohammad Subid Ali | Awami League |
| Dacca | Dacca | Dhaka-11 | Hamidur Rahman | Awami League |
| Dacca | Dacca | Dhaka-12 | Mohammad Sirajul Islam | Awami League |
| Dacca | Dacca | Dhaka-13 | Gazi Golam Mustafa | Awami League |
| Dacca | Dacca | Dhaka-14 | Dr. Mosharraf Hossain | Awami League |
| Dacca | Dacca | Dhaka-15 | Hedayetullah Islam | Awami League |
| Dacca | Dacca | Dhaka-16 | Shafir Uddin | Awami League |
| Dacca | Dacca | Dhaka-17 | Abdul Hakim Master | Awami League |
| Dacca | Dacca | Dhaka-18 | Mohammad Anwar Jang | Awami League |
| Dacca | Dacca | Dhaka-19 | Mohammad Jamal Uddin | Awami League |
| Dacca | Dacca | Dhaka-20 | Fakir Shahabuddin Ahmad | Awami League |
| Dacca | Dacca | Dhaka-21 | Mohammad Moyez Uddin | Awami League |
| Dacca | Dacca | Dhaka-22 | Gazi Fazlur Rahman | Awami League |
| Dacca | Dacca | Dhaka-23 | Shamshuddin Bhuiyan | Awami League |
| Dacca | Dacca | Dhaka-24 | Raziuddin Ahmad | Awami League |
| Dacca | Dacca | Dhaka-25 | Maslehuddin Bhuiyan | Awami League |
| Dacca | Dacca | Dhaka-26 | Kazi Sahabuddin Ahmed | Awami League |
| Dacca | Dacca | Dhaka-27 | Dr. Sadat Ali Sikder | Awami League |
| Dacca | Dacca | Dhaka-28 | Shajat Ali Mokhtar | Awami League |
| Dacca | Dacca | Dhaka-29 | Afzal Hossain | Awami League |
| Dacca | Dacca | Dhaka-30 | S. Abdus Sattar Bhuiyan | Awami League |
| Dacca | Faridpur | Faridpur-1 | Kazi Hedayet Hossain | Awami League |
| Dacca | Faridpur | Faridpur-2 | Mohammad Muslim Uddin Mridha | Awami League |
| Dacca | Faridpur | Faridpur-3 | Gaur Chandra Bala | Awami League |
| Dacca | Faridpur | Faridpur-4 | Dr. Aftabuddin Molla | Awami League |
| Dacca | Faridpur | Faridpur-5 | Imam Uddin Ahmad | Awami League |
| Dacca | Faridpur | Faridpur-6 | Mosharraf Hossain | Awami League |
| Dacca | Faridpur | Faridpur-7 | A. Y. Amin Uddin Ahmad | Awami League |
| Dacca | Faridpur | Faridpur-8 | Syed Hyder Hossain | Awami League |
| Dacca | Faridpur | Faridpur-9 | Kazi Abdur Rashid | Awami League |
| Dacca | Faridpur | Faridpur-10 | Akhter Uddin Mia | Awami League |
| Dacca | Faridpur | Faridpur-11 | Sheikh Mosharraf Hossain | Awami League |
| Dacca | Faridpur | Faridpur-12 | Satish Chandra Haldar | Awami League |
| Dacca | Faridpur | Faridpur-13 | Ilias Ahmed Chowdhury | Awami League |
| Dacca | Faridpur | Faridpur-14 | Asmat Ali Khan | Awami League |
| Dacca | Faridpur | Faridpur-15 | Aminul Islam Danesh Mia | Awami League |
| Dacca | Faridpur | Faridpur-16 | Mohammad Matiur Rahman | Awami League |
| Dacca | Faridpur | Faridpur-17 | Ali Ahmad Khan | Awami League |
| Dacca | Faridpur | Faridpur-18 | Mohammad Abdur Razzaq | Awami League |
| Dacca | Faridpur | Faridpur-19 | Phani Bhushan Majumdar | Awami League |
| Chittagong | Sylhet | Sylhet-1 | Abdul Hakeem Chowdhury | Awami League |
| Chittagong | Sylhet | Sylhet-2 | Suranjit Sengupta | National Awami Party |
| Chittagong | Sylhet | Sylhet-3 | Abdur Rais | Awami League |
| Chittagong | Sylhet | Sylhet-4 | Shamsu Mia Chowdhury | Awami League |
| Chittagong | Sylhet | Sylhet-5 | Miah Abduz Zahur | Awami League |
| Chittagong | Sylhet | Sylhet-6 | Lutfar Rahman | Awami League |
| Chittagong | Sylhet | Sylhet-7 | Kazi Sirajuddin Ahmad | Awami League |
| Chittagong | Sylhet | Sylhet-8 | Dr. A. Malik | Awami League |
| Chittagong | Sylhet | Sylhet-9 | Mohammad Habibur Rahman | Awami League |
| Chittagong | Sylhet | Sylhet-10 | Mohammad Abdul Latif | Awami League |
| Chittagong | Sylhet | Sylhet-11 | Masud Ahmed Chaudhuri | Awami League |
| Chittagong | Sylhet | Sylhet-12 | Taimuz Alam | Awami League |
| Chittagong | Sylhet | Sylhet-13 | Ali Sarwar Khan | Awami League |
| Chittagong | Sylhet | Sylhet-14 | Toabur Rahim | Awami League |
| Chittagong | Sylhet | Sylhet-15 | Altafur Rahman Chowdhury | Awami League |
| Chittagong | Sylhet | Sylhet-16 | Azizur Rahman | Awami League |
| Chittagong | Sylhet | Sylhet-17 | Enamul Haq | Awami League |
| Chittagong | Sylhet | Sylhet-18 | Asad Ali | Awami League |
| Chittagong | Sylhet | Sylhet-19 | Dr. Abul Hashem | Awami League |
| Chittagong | Sylhet | Sylhet-20 | Gopal Krishna Maharatna | Awami League |
| Chittagong | Sylhet | Sylhet-21 | Abdul Aziz Chaudhuri | Independent politician |
| Chittagong | Comilla | Comilla-1 | Mozammel Haq | Awami League |
| Chittagong | Comilla | Comilla-2 | Syed Sirajul Islam | Awami League |
| Chittagong | Comilla | Comilla-3 | Lutful Hai Sachchu | Awami League |
| Chittagong | Comilla | Comilla-4 | Syed Emdadul Bari | Awami League |
| Chittagong | Comilla | Comilla-5 | Ahmed Ali | Awami League |
| Chittagong | Comilla | Comilla-6 | Kazi Akbar Uddin Mohammad Siddique | Awami League |
| Chittagong | Comilla | Comilla-7 | Maulvi Mahiuddin | Awami League |
| Chittagong | Comilla | Comilla-8 | Muzaffar Ali | Awami League |
| Chittagong | Comilla | Comilla-9 | Abdur Rashid | Awami League |
| Chittagong | Comilla | Comilla-10 | Mohammad Hashem | Awami League |
| Chittagong | Comilla | Comilla-11 | Haji Ramizuddin | Independent politician |
| Chittagong | Comilla | Comilla-12 | Abdul Aziz Khan | Awami League |
| Chittagong | Comilla | Comilla-13 | Abdul Hakim | Awami League |
| Chittagong | Comilla | Comilla-14 | Amir Hossain | Awami League |
| Chittagong | Comilla | Comilla-15 | Mohammad Abdul Malek | Awami League |
| Chittagong | Comilla | Comilla-16 | Ali Akbar Majumdar | Awami League |
| Chittagong | Comilla | Comilla-17 | Mir Hossain Chaudhuri | Awami League |
| Chittagong | Comilla | Comilla-18 | Abdul Awal | Awami League |
| Chittagong | Comilla | Comilla-19 | Jalal Ahmed | Awami League |
| Chittagong | Comilla | Comilla-20 | Sikandar Ali | Awami League |
| Chittagong | Comilla | Comilla-21 | Abdus Sattar | Awami League |
| Chittagong | Comilla | Comilla-22 | A. B. Siddique Sarkar | Awami League |
| Chittagong | Comilla | Comilla-23 | Golam Morshed Farooqi | Awami League |
| Chittagong | Comilla | Comilla-24 | Abdul Karim Patwary | Awami League |
| Chittagong | Comilla | Comilla-25 | Sirajul Islam Patwari | Awami League |
| Chittagong | Comilla | Comilla-26 | Mohammad Raja Mia | Awami League |
| Chittagong | Noakhali | Noakhali-1 | A. F. K. Safdar | Awami League |
| Chittagong | Noakhali | Noakhali-2 | Maulvi Khair Uddin | Awami League |
| Chittagong | Noakhali | Noakhali-3 | A. B. M. Taleb Ali | Awami League |
| Chittagong | Noakhali | Noakhali-4 | Abu Naser Choudhury | Awami League |
| Chittagong | Noakhali | Noakhali-5 | Abdus Sobhan | Awami League |
| Chittagong | Noakhali | Noakhali-6 | Master Rafiqullah Mia | Awami League |
| Chittagong | Noakhali | Noakhali-7 | Mohammad Shaukat Ullah | Awami League |
| Chittagong | Noakhali | Noakhali-8 | Nurul Ahmed Chaudhuri | Awami League |
| Chittagong | Noakhali | Noakhali-9 | Mohammad Mohammadullah | Awami League |
| Chittagong | Noakhali | Noakhali-10 | Bismillah Mia | Awami League |
| Chittagong | Noakhali | Noakhali-11 | Mohammad Abdul Mohaimen | Awami League |
| Chittagong | Noakhali | Noakhali-12 | Shahiduddin Iskandar | Awami League |
| Chittagong | Noakhali | Noakhali-13 | Sirajul Islam | Awami League |
| Chittagong | Noakhali | Noakhali-14 | Amirul Islam | Awami League |
| Chittagong | Chittagong | Chittagong-1 | Mosharraf Hossain | Awami League |
| Chittagong | Chittagong | Chittagong-2 | Shamsul Huq | Awami League |
| Chittagong | Chittagong | Chittagong-3 | M. Obaidul Huq | Awami League |
| Chittagong | Chittagong | Chittagong-4 | Mirza Abu Mansur | Awami League |
| Chittagong | Chittagong | Chittagong-5 | Mohammad Abdul Wahab | Awami League |
| Chittagong | Chittagong | Chittagong-6 | Abdullah Al Harun | Awami League |
| Chittagong | Chittagong | Chittagong-7 | Mohammad Ishaq | Awami League |
| Chittagong | Chittagong | Chittagong-8 | Zahur Ahmed Chaudhuri | Awami League |
| Chittagong | Chittagong | Chittagong-9 | Dr. M. A. Manan | Awami League |
| Chittagong | Chittagong | Chittagong-10 | Dr. Abul Qasem | Awami League |
| Chittagong | Chittagong | Chittagong-11 | Sultan Ahmed | Awami League |
| Chittagong | Chittagong | Chittagong-12 | Akhtaruzzaman Chaudhuri Babu | Awami League |
| Chittagong | Chittagong | Chittagong-13 | Dr. B. M. Faizur Rahman | Awami League |
| Chittagong | Chittagong | Chittagong-14 | Sirajul Islam Chowdhury | Awami League |
| Chittagong | Chittagong | Chittagong-15 | Ahmed Sagir Shahzada | Nizam-e-Islam Party |
| Chittagong | Chittagong | Chittagong-16 | Zahirul Islam | Awami League |
| Chittagong | Chittagong | Chittagong-17 | Mostaq Ahmad Chowdhury | Independent politician |
| Chittagong | Chittagong | Chittagong-18 | Osman Sarwar Alam Chowdhury | Awami League |
| Chittagong | Chittagong Hill Tracts | Chittagong Hills-1 | Manabendra Narayan Larma | Parbatya Chattagram Jana Samhati Samiti |
| Chittagong | Chittagong Hill Tracts | Chittagong Hills-2 | Chai Thowai Rowaza | Parbatya Chattagram Jana Samhati Samiti |

== Aftermath ==
Despite the Awami League's landslide victory and clear mandate. Yahya Khan and the Pakistan People's Party (PPP) didn't want the majority from East Pakistan to rule Pakistan. Bhutto said "udhar tum, idhar hum" (you rule East, we rule West) and threatened PPP members of parliament by saying that he will break legs of those who will go to Dhaka to attend the National Assembly session called on 3 March, 1971, because he wanted to block Sheikh Mujibur Rahman from becoming Prime Minister of Pakistan. After the National Assembly session was cancelled by President Yahya Khan on March 1. Sheikh Mujibur Rahman gave his famous speech on March 7 to a huge crowd at Ramna Course Ground in Dhaka and demanded lifting of martial law, withdrawal of army to their barracks and transfer of power to the elected representatives by the people before the 25 March National Assembly session. On 26 March, 1971, the Pakistan military launched Operation Searchlight against Bengali nationalists to curb the Bengali nationalist movement in East Bengal. Sheikh Mujibur Rehman declared the independence of Bangladesh on 26 March 1971. This led to a start of a 9 month long war which led to the surrender of Pakistani forces in East Pakistan and the independence of Bangladesh.
