= Abul Hashem =

Abul Hashem (Bengali: আবুল হাশেম) is a Bengali masculine given name of Arabic origin and may refer to:

- Abul Hashim (1905–1974), politician and activist
- Md Abul Hashem (1922–2021), social worker and politician
- Abul Hashem Momenshahi (1930–2022), Mymensingh politician
- Abul Hasem Mondal (born 1946), West Bengali politician
- Abul Hashem (born 1950), banker
- Abul Hashem Khan (1955–2024), Comilla politician

== See also ==
- Hashim (name)
