= Abdul Awal =

Abdul Awal may refer to:

- Abdul Awal (Pakistani politician), member of the National Assembly of Pakistan for East Pakistan
- Abdul Awal (Comilla politician), Bangladeshi Awami League politician
- Abdul Awal (Rangpur politician), Bangladeshi Awami League politician
