= Anwarul Karim Chowdhury =

Bangladeshi diplomat

- আনোয়ারুল করিম চৌধুরী

Permanent Representative of Bangladesh to the United Nations
- In office 1996–2001
- Preceded by: Reaz Rahman
- Succeeded by: Iftekhar Ahmed Chowdhury

Personal details
- Born: 5 February 1943 (age 83) Dhaka, Bengal Province, British India
- Education: University of Dhaka

Anwarul Karim Chowdhury (Bengali: আনোয়ারুল করিম চৌধুরী; born 5 February 1943) is a Bangladeshi diplomat most noted for his work on development in the poorest nations, global peace and championing the rights of women and children. In a speech he gave in 2005, Chowdhury stated: "We should not forget that when women are marginalized, there is little chance for an open and participatory society." In his role as the leading United Nations Culture of Peace emissary, he said in May 2010 that peace efforts would continually fail until people embraced humanity's oneness.

== Biography ==
Chowdhury was appointed in March 2002 by the Secretary-General of the United Nations as Under-Secretary-General and High Representative for the Least Developed Countries, Landlocked Developing Countries and Small Island Developing States.

In December 2003, Chowdhury was designated as the Secretary-General of the International Meeting for the ten-year review of the Barbados Programme of Action for the Sustainable Development of the Small Island Developing States held in Mauritius from 10 to 14 January 2005. Chowdhury was also designated the Secretary-General of the International Ministerial Conference of Landlocked and Transit Developing Countries and the Donor Community on Transit Transport Cooperation held in Almaty, Kazakhstan on 28–29 August 2003.

Prior to his appointment, Chowdhury completed his assignment (1996–2001) as Permanent Representative of Bangladesh to the United Nations in New York City. He also served as Bangladesh's Ambassador to Chile, Nicaragua, Peru and Venezuela, as well as Bangladesh's High Commissioner to the Bahamas and Guyana.

During his tenure as Permanent Representative, Chowdhury served as President of the Security Council, President of the United Nations Children's Fund (UNICEF) Executive Board and Vice-President of the Economic and Social Council of the UN in 1997 and 1998. He had served for more than 10 years as the Coordinator for the Least Developed Countries in New York City. In May 2001, he led the negotiations on behalf of the least developed countries at the Third United Nations Conference on Least Developed Countries, which adopted the comprehensive Brussels Programme of Action for the present decade. Chowdhury also chaired the Fifth (Administrative and Budgetary) Committee of the United Nations General Assembly in 1997–1998. From 1990 to 1993, Chowdhury was the UNICEF Director for Japan, Australia and New Zealand.

At the first annual Peace Education Conference, held virtually in September 2021, Chowdhury was the inaugural keynote speaker, as Founder of the Global Movement for the Culture of Peace. Also featured was Dr. Stéphane Monney Mouandjo, Director-General of CAFRAD, a UNPAN member, along with other dignitaries.

== Education ==
Chowdhury was born in 1943 in Dhaka, British India and joined the diplomatic service in 1967. He holds a Master of Arts degree in contemporary history and International Relations from the University of Dhaka. He has been a regular contributor to journals on peace, development and human rights issues, and a speaker at academic institutions and other forums. He also served as an adjunct professor at the School of Diplomacy, Seton Hall University of South Orange, New Jersey, the United States.

== Honours ==
Chowdhury is the recipient of the U Thant Peace Award and UNESCO Gandhi Gold Medal for Culture of Peace. He is an Honorary Patron of the Committee on Teaching About the UN (CTAUN), New York. In March 2003, Soka University of Japan conferred on Chowdhury an honorary doctorate for his work on women's issues, child rights and culture of peace as well as for the strengthening of the United Nations. His initiative in March 2000 as the president of the Security Council led to the adoption of the groundbreaking the UN Security Council Resolution 1325 on the role of women in peace and security.

Chowdhury has been decorated by the Government of Burkina Faso with the country's highest honour, L'Ordre national, on 18 June 2007 in Ouagadougou for his championship of the cause of the most vulnerable countries.

== Interfaith dialogue ==
On 2 December 2008, Chowdury said: "Interfaith dialogue is absolutely essential, relevant, and necessary. ... If 2009 is to truly be the Year of Interfaith Cooperation, the UN urgently needs to appoint an interfaith representative at a senior level in the Secretariat."
