= Farida Rahman (professor) =

Bangladeshi educationist and politician

- ফরিদা রহমান

Member of Bangladesh Parliament - Reserved Women's Seat-05
- In office 6 November 1975 – 7 April 1973

Personal details
- Born: Unknown
- Died: Unknown (Note: Farida Rahman is mentioned as 'untimely deceased' between 1999 and 2003, by Anisuzzaman (on page 120 of his autobiography 'Kal Nirvadhi' published in 2003))
- Party: Bangladesh Awami League

Farida Rahman was a Bangladeshi educationist and politician. She was the first woman to serve as a member of parliament from the reserved seat for women in the National Assembly. She was a member of the Standing Committee on Special Rights.

== Political career ==
Farida Rahman was a member of the first National Parliament of Bangladesh, elected from the reserved women's seat-5, representing the Jessore and Kushtia regions, under the nomination of the Bangladesh Awami League.

=== Role in Parliament ===
==== Questions and recommendations for the public ====
Farida Rahman was a member of Bangladesh's first parliament after the Liberation War. As an MP elected from women's seat-5, she was not only involved in drafting laws but also played an active role in solving various public problems. According to Rule 226 of the National Parliament's Rules of Procedure, she was a member of the 'Special Privileges Standing Committee.'

==== Scrutiny of railways and public transportation ====
On June 14, 1973, during the second session of Parliament, while discussing the railway budget, Farida Rahman highlighted the weaknesses in railway management. She drew the government's attention to issues such as ticketless travel and the maintenance of railway assets. She stated that mere requests were not enough and that effective programs needed to be implemented. She also emphasized the need for a survey to identify ticketless travelers so that appropriate preventative measures could be taken.

==== Transparency in foreign scholarships and adoptions ====
In Parliament, Farida Rahman raised questions on various issues, demanding accountability from the government. On June 21, 1973, she asked Minister Abdul Mannan for information on how many children had been adopted by foreign nationals and which organizations were acting as agents for this work in Bangladesh.

The next day, on June 22, she posed several questions to the Ministers of Foreign Affairs and Education. She inquired about the number of foreign embassies in Bangladesh and the number of foreign scholarships available for studying abroad. She specifically requested detailed accounts of scholarships received from socialist countries, scholarships allocated for female students, and the government's own scholarship programs. She also asked for a district-wise breakdown, which reflected her interest in transparency and accountability.

==== Girl Guides Bill and women's self-reliance ====
On September 26, 1973, during the third parliamentary session, Farida Rahman introduced the Bangladesh Girl Guides Association Bill. She highlighted the importance of Girl Guides, stating that it was not just an international institution but also taught girls sound principles, organization, and self-reliance. She said, "Girl Guides teaches girls to be self-reliant. Today, there is a special need for girls in Bangladesh to be self-reliant." She referred to the bill as an important part of education and argued against the prevailing negative perceptions of the Girl Guides in society.
