= Reaz Rahman =

Bangladeshi politician

State Minister of Foreign Affairs
- In office 11 October 2001 – 25 March 2004

Permanent Representative of Bangladesh to the United Nations
- In office 1994–1996
- Preceded by: M. Humayun Kabir
- Succeeded by: Anwarul Karim Chowdhury

Ambassador of Bangladesh to Italy
- In office 14 February 1983 – 17 July 1986
- Preceded by: Abul Ahsan
- Succeeded by: Waliur Rahman

Personal details
- Party: Bangladesh Nationalist Party

Reaz Rahman is a Bangladesh Nationalist Party politician and a former state minister of Foreign Affairs. He served as an ambassador of Bangladesh to Italy during 1983–1986.

== Career ==
Rahman served in the foreign service of Pakistan. He stayed in West Pakistan during the Bangladesh Liberation war in 1971. He escaped Pakistan in 1973 with his family through Afghanistan. In Afghanistan with the aid of the Indian High Commission he was able to move to Bangladesh. He joined the foreign service of Bangladesh and reached the rank of secretary of the Ministry of Foreign Affairs. He served as the permanent representative of Bangladesh to the United Nations from 6 January 1994 to 1996.

He served as the state minister of Foreign Affairs in the Third Khaleda ministry from 2001 until his resignation on 25 March 2004. He is an advisor to the chairperson of the Bangladesh Nationalist Party, former prime minister Khaleda Zia.

=== Attack in Gulshan ===
On 14 January 2015, Rahman's car was attacked and he was shot twice by 6 unknown attackers on motorcycles in Gulshan. The Bangladesh Nationalist Party called a strike on the following Thursday and blamed the government for the attack. The US State Department and the European Union condemned the attack on him and asked the government to investigate to find out those responsible.
