= Syed Emdadul Bari =

Bangladeshi politician

Member of East Pakistan Provincial Assembly
- In office 1970–1970
- Constituency: Comilla-4

Personal details
- Born: 23 November 1935 Ranikhar, Tipperah District, Bengal Presidency
- Died: September 7, 2020 (aged 84) Combined Military Hospital, Dhaka, Bangladesh
- Party: Awami League
- Education: Comilla Law College

Syed A. K. Mohammad Emdadul Bari (Bengali: সৈয়দ এ কে মোহাম্মদ এমদাদুল বারী; 23 November 1935 – 7 September 2020) was a Bangladeshi politician, freedom fighter and lawyer.

== Early life and education ==
Emdadul Bari was born on 23 November 1935 to a Bengali family of Muslim Syeds in the village of Ranikhar in Akhaura, Brahmanbaria subdivision, Tipperah District, Bengal Presidency (now Bangladesh). He was a father to two sons and three daughters.

Emdadul Bari studied at the Ranikhar Primary School, and then at the Talshahar A. I. School from where he passed with a first class in his matriculation. He completed his Intermediate of Arts from Haji Asmat College in Bhairab, and graduated with a Bachelor of Arts with honours in political science from the Dhaka Salimullah Academy. Emdadul Bari received his Bachelor of Laws from the Comilla Law College.

== Career ==
Emdadul Bari began his career as a lawyer in Comilla in 1965. He relocated to Brahmanbaria Court in 1966. He continued to work within the legal sector despite being involved in politics. He was elected to the East Pakistan Provincial Assembly as an Awami League candidate for Comilla-4 at the 1970 elections but this assembly was not formed. Then the Bangladesh Liberation War broke out and so he became the president of the Media Office of the South-Eastern Front. He participated in the Liberation War from Sector 2 and served as the head of Bijla Camp.

In 2011, he was appointed as the commissioner of Brahmanbaria District Council.

== Death ==
Emdadul Bari died on 7 September 2020 at 6:50pm in Combined Military Hospital, Dhaka, Bangladesh.
