= Arjumand Banu (politician) =

Bangladeshi politician

Member of Bangladesh Parliament
- In office 7 March 1973 – 6 November 1976

Personal details
- Political party: Awami League

Arjumand Banu (Bengali: আর্জুমান্দ বানু) is a Awami League politician and a former member of the Bangladesh Parliament in a reserved seat for women.

== Career ==
Banu was elected to a seat reserved for women in parliament as an Awami League candidate in 1973.
