= Rafiq Uddin Sarkar =

Bangladeshi politician

Member of Bangladesh Parliament
- In office 1973–1976

Personal details
- Died: 6 April 1981; Jonail, Baraigram, Natore
- Political party: Bangladesh Awami League

Rafiq Uddin Sarkar (Bengali: রফিক উদ্দিন সরকার) was a Bangladesh Awami League politician and a former member of parliament for Rajshahi-17.

== Career ==
Sarkar was elected to parliament from Rajshahi-17 as an Awami League candidate in 1973.

== Death ==
Sarkar was murdered on 6 April 1981 at Jonail in Baraigram thana, Natore, Bangladesh.
