= M. M. Nawab Ali =

Bangladeshi politician

MM Nawab Ali

Member of Bangladesh Parliament
- In office 1973–1976

Personal details
- Party: Awami League

MM Nawab Ali (Bengali: এম এম নওয়াব আলী) is an Awami League politician in Bangladesh and a former member of parliament for Khulna-10.

== Career ==
Ali was elected to parliament from Khulna-10 as an Awami League candidate in 1973.
