= Tofazzal Hossain (Gaibandha politician) =

Bangladeshi politician

Member of Bangladesh Parliament
- In office 1973–1976

Personal details
- Died: July 7, 2021 (aged 74) Nuniagari, Palashbari Upazila, Gaibhanda District, Bangladesh
- Political party: Awami League

Tofazzal Hossain was an Awami League politician and a member of parliament for Rangpur-22.

== Career ==
Hossain was elected to parliament from Rangpur-22 as an Awami League candidate in 1973.

He died on 7 July 2021, aged 74.
