= Shamsul Huq (professor) =

Bangladeshi professor

Shamsul Huq (Bengali: শামসুল হক) was a professor who was elected as a member of the All-Pakistan Awami League from the Chittagong-2 constituency in the 1970 East Pakistan Provincial Assembly election. He later served as a minister in the Malik ministry in 1971.

== Biography ==
Shamsul was a resident of West Saidpur village in Sitakunda Upazila of Chittagong District, Bangladesh. He was the head of the economics department at Government City College, Chittagong. He was also a member of the Income Tax Advisory Committee, Pakistan Economic Association, and the Chittagong Chamber of Commerce and Industry. Additionally, Shamsul served as chairman of the Chittagong Economic Association and president of the Purbachalan Council. In the 1970 East Pakistan Provincial Assembly election, he was elected as a member of the All-Pakistan Awami League from the Chittagong-2 constituency. During the Bangladesh Liberation War in 1971, he was appointed as the relief and rehabilitation minister in the Malik ministry, the last provincial cabinet in East Pakistan.
