= Khurshida Moyejuddin =

Bangladeshi politician

Member of Bangladesh Parliament
- In office 7 March 1973 – 6 November 1976

Personal details
- Political party: Awami League

Khurshida Moyejuddin (Bengali: খুরশীদা ময়েজউদ্দিন) is a Awami League politician and a former member of the Bangladesh Parliament for a seat reserved for women

== Career ==
Moyejuddin was elected to parliament from a women's reserved seat as an Awami League candidate in 1973.
