= Mubarak Hossain =

Bangladeshi politician

Member of Bangladesh Parliament
- In office 1973–1976

Personal details
- Political party: Awami League

Mubarak Hossain (Bengali: সাদত আলী সিকদার) is an Awami League politician in Bangladesh and a former member of parliament for Dhaka-28.

== Career ==
Hossain was elected to parliament from Dhaka-28 as an Awami League candidate in 1973. He was elected to parliament from Rajshahi-5 as a Jatiya Party candidate in 1986.

== Death ==
Hossain died in 1995.
