= Oli Ahmed (Comilla politician) =

Bangladeshi politician

Member of Bangladesh Parliament
- In office 7 March 1973 – 6 November 1976

Personal details
- Party: Awami League

Oli Ahmed (Bengali: অলি আহমেদ) is an Awami League politician in Bangladesh and a former member of parliament for Comilla-16.

== Career ==
Ahmed was elected to parliament from Comilla-16 as an Awami League candidate in 1973.
