= Abdul Latif Mia =

Bangladeshi politician

Member of Bangladesh Parliament
- In office 1973–1976

Personal details
- Died: 2021
- Party: Bangladesh Awami League

Abdul Latif Mia was a Bangladesh Awami League politician in Bangladesh and a former member of parliament for Dinajpur-10.

== Career ==
Mia was elected to parliament from Dinajpur-10 as a Bangladesh Awami League candidate in 1973.
