= Hashem Ali Khan =

Bangladeshi politician

Member of Bangladesh Parliament
- In office 1973–1976

Personal details
- Political party: Awami League

Hashem Ali Khan is a Awami League politician in Bangladesh and a former member of parliament for Bogra-9.

== Career ==
Khan was elected to parliament from Bogra-9 as an Awami League candidate in 1973.
