= Mosleh Uddin Ahmed =

Bangladeshi politician

Member of Bangladesh Parliament
- In office 1973–1976

Personal details
- Political party: Awami League

Mosleh Uddin Ahmed (Bengali: মোসলেহ উদ্দিন আহমেদ) is a Awami League politician in Bangladesh and a former member of parliament for Dhaka-25.

== Career ==
Ahmed was elected to parliament from Dhaka-25 as an Awami League candidate in 1973.
