= Mozammel Haque (Comilla politician) =

Bangladeshi politician

Member of Bangladesh Parliament
- In office 1979–1986
- Preceded by: Kazi Akbar Uddin Mohammad Siddique
- Succeeded by: Redwan Ahmed

Personal details
- Born: Bancharampur, Brahmanbaria
- Died: 14 July 1985
- Party: Bangladesh Nationalist Party

Mozammel Haque is a Bangladesh Nationalist Party politician and a former member of parliament for Comilla-6.

== Career ==
Haque was elected to parliament from Comilla-6 as a Bangladesh Nationalist Party candidate in 1979.
