= Abdus Salam Mia =

Bangladeshi politician

Member of Bangladesh Parliament
- In office 1973–1976

Personal details
- Political party: Awami League

Abdus Salam Mia (Bengali: আবদুস সালাম মিয়া) is a Awami League politician in Bangladesh and a former member of parliament for Faridpur-6.

== Career ==
Mia was elected to parliament from Faridpur-6 as an Awami League candidate in 1973.
