= Golam Hasnayen =

Bangladeshi lawyer (died 2021)

Golam Hasnayen (1929/30 – 4 December 2021) was a Bangladeshi lawyer, veteran of the Bangladesh Liberation war, and recipient of the Ekushey Padak, the second highest civilian award in Bangladesh.

== Life and career ==
Hasnayen was arrested during the Vutta Andolon in 1967. The Vutta Andolon were a series of riots, after locals fell ill after eating flour imported from West Pakistan, which they believed was poisoned.

He died on 4 December 2021, at the age of 91.
