= Mohiuddin Ahmed (Pabna politician) =

Politician-Bangladesh

Member of Bangladesh Parliament
- In office 1973–1976

Personal details
- Party: Bangladesh Awami League

Mohiuddin Ahmed (Bengali: মহিউদ্দিন আহমেদ) is a Bangladesh Awami League politician and a former member of parliament for Pabna-11.

== Career ==
Ahmed was elected to parliament from Pabna-11 as an Awami League candidate in 1973.
