= Nazir Ahmad Talukder =

Bangladeshi politician

Member of Bangladesh Parliament
- In office 1973–1976

Personal details
- Political party: Awami League

Nazir Ahmad Talukder (Bengali: নজির আহম্মদ তালুকদার) is a Awami League politician in Bangladesh and a former member of parliament for Faridpur-9.

== Career ==
Talukder was elected to parliament from Faridpur-9 as an Awami League candidate in 1973.
