= Safiullah (politician) =

Bangladeshi politician (1946–2008)

Member of Bangladesh Parliament
- In office 7 March 1973 – 6 November 1976

Personal details
- Born: 1946
- Died: October 25, 2008 (aged 61–62)
- Party: Awami League

Safiullah (Bengali: সফিউল্লা; 1946 — 25 October 2008) was a Bangladeshi politician and a member of parliament for the Comilla-26 constituency as a member of the Awami League.

== Career ==
Safiullah was elected to the Jatiya Sangsad representing the Comilla-26 constituency as an Awami League candidate in 1973.

== Death ==
Safiullah died on 25 October 2008.
