= Saiful Islam (Natore politician) =

Bangladeshi politician (died 2020)

Member of Bangladesh Parliament
- In office 1973–1976

Personal details
- Political party: Bangladesh Awami League

Saiful Islam was a Bangladesh Awami League politician and a member of parliament for Rajshahi-15.

== Career ==
Islam was elected to parliament from Rajshahi-15 as an Awami League candidate in 1973.

== Death ==
Islam died on 10 May 2020 at Rajshahi Medical College Hospital.
