= Akhter Mia =

Bangladeshi politician

Parliament Member of Faridpur-8
- In office 18 February 1979 – 12 February 1982
- Preceded by: Shamsuddin Mollah
- Succeeded by: The seat is cancelled

Personal details
- Born: Akhter Uddin Mia; 10 September 1920; Kashiani, Gopalganj
- Died: 28 September 1984; Kashiani Hospital, Gopalganj
- Political party: Bangladesh Awami League
- Awards: Ekushey Padak- 2023

Akhtar Uddin Mia, known as Akhtar Mia. (Bengali: আকতার মিয়া; 10 September 1920 – 28 September 1984) was a Bangladeshi politician who was the member of parliament for constituency Faridpur-8. In 2023, the government of Bangladesh nominated him posthumously for the Ekushey Padak.

== Biography ==
Aktar Uddin Mia was born on 10 September 1920 in Ghonapara village of Ratil Union of Kashiani in Gopalganj. He passed the entrance examination in 1938. He joined the British Army and participated in World War II. After passing Moktari in 1947, he started practicing law in Gopalganj Court.

=== Political life ===
Akhter Mia was the former president of the Gopalganj subdivision Awami League. He was elected as a member of the National Assembly of Pakistan from the Kashiani constituency in the 1970 elections. He played an active role in the 6-point and 11-point movements. In 1971, he went to India during the Liberation War and took charge of managing the Kadihati Youth Reception Camp.

He was elected member of parliament from the Faridpur-8 constituency as a candidate of the Bangladesh Awami League in the second National Parliament election of 1979.

== Death ==
Aktar Uddin Mia died on 28 September 1984 at Kashiani Hospital, Gopalganj.
