= Khandakar Abdul Malek Shahidullah =

Indian language activist (died 2021)

Khandakar Abdul Malek Shahidullah (died February 2, 2021) was a language activist of the Bengali language movement that took place in the erstwhile East Pakistan (currently Bangladesh) to make Bengali one of the state languages of Pakistan. He was elected to the East Pakistan provincial assembly in 1970. He was also an organiser of Bangladesh Liberation War.
