= Sadat Ali Sikder =

Bangladeshi politician

Member of Bangladesh Parliament
- In office 1973–1976

Personal details
- Died: 19 June 2017; Dhaka, Bangladesh
- Political party: Awami League

Sadat Ali Sikder (Bengali: সাদত আলী সিকদার) was a Awami League politician in Bangladesh and a former member of parliament for Dhaka-27.

== Career ==
Sikder was elected to parliament from Dhaka-27 as an Awami League candidate in 1973.

== Death ==
Sikder died on 19 June 2017 at Combined Military Hospital (Dhaka).
