= Syed Ator Ali =

Bangladeshi politician

- সৈয়দ আতর আলী
- Born: 1916
- Died: 13 October 1971 (aged 54–55)
- Education: Presidency College, Kolkata
- Occupation: Politician
- Political party: Awami League

Syed Ator Ali (1916-1971) was an organizer of Bangladeshi liberation war and politician. He was the political convenor of Sector No. 8 and 9 during Liberation War.

== Biography ==
Syed Ator Ali was born in 1916 in Magura District. He had read in Gangarampur PK High School & Narail Victoria College. He had received his bachelor's degree from Presidency College, Kolkata. He has become an MPA from Magura-2 in 1970 in East Pakistan Provincial Assembly.

In 1971, he has become Political convenor of 8 & 9 number sector. In September of that year, he became sick. He had died on 13 October 1971 in Kalyani Hospital of 24 Pargana of West Bengal. For his last wish, he was buried in Kashipur village of Jhikargacha Upazila of Jessore District. The place was free from Pakistani Army at that time.
