= Mohammad Abdul Hakim =

Bangladeshi politician

Member of Bangladesh Parliament
- In office 1973–1975
- Succeeded by: Khurram Khan Chowdhury

Personal details
- Party: Bangladesh Awami League

Mohammad Abdul Hakim is a Bangladesh Awami League politician and a former member of parliament for Mymensingh-5.

== Career ==
Hakim was elected to parliament from Mymensingh-5 as a Bangladesh Awami League candidate in 1973.
