= Nurul Haque (Noakhali politician) =

Bangladeshi politician

Member of Bangladesh Parliament
- In office 7 March 1973 – 6 November 1976

Personal details
- Political party: Awami League

Nurul Haque (Bengali: নুরুল হক) is an Awami League politician in Bangladesh and a former member of parliament for Noakhali-7.

== Career ==
Haque was elected to parliament from Noakhali-7 as an Awami League candidate in 1973.
