= Azizur Rahman Akkas =

Bangladeshi politician

Member of Bangladesh Parliament

Personal details
- Party: Bangladesh Awami League

Azizur Rahman Akkas is a Bangladesh Awami League politician and a former member of parliament for Kushtia-1.

== Career ==
Akkas was elected to parliament from Kushtia-1 as a Bangladesh Awami League candidate in 1973.
