= Md. Abdul Kadir =

Bangladeshi politician (died 2019)

- Died: 10 December 2019; Bangabandhu Sheikh Mujib Medical University Hospital, Dhaka, Bangladesh.
- Occupation: Politician
- Political party: Awami League

Md. Abdul Kadir (died 10 December 2019) was a Bangladeshi politician from Kishorganj belonging to Awami League. He took part in the Liberation War of Bangladesh. He was elected as a member of the East Pakistan Provincial Assembly.

== Biography ==
Abdul Kadir was elected as a member of the East Pakistan Provincial Assembly in 1970 as an Awami League candidate. In 1971 he took part in the Liberation War of Bangladesh.

Abdul Kadir died on 10 December 2019 in Bangabandhu Sheikh Mujib Medical University Hospital, Dhaka.
