= Abdur Rashid (Noakhali politician) =

Bangladeshi politician

M Abdur Rashid

Member of Bangladesh Parliament
- In office 7 March 1973 – 6 November 1976

Personal details
- Political party: Awami League

M Abdur Rashid (Bengali: মুহাম্মদ আবদুর রশিদ) is an Awami League politician in Bangladesh and a former member of parliament for Noakhali-8.

== Career ==
Rashid was elected to parliament from Noakhali-8 as an Awami League candidate in 1973.
