= Abdul Khaleq =

Bangladeshi politician

Mohammad Abdul Khaleq

Member of Bangladesh Parliament
- In office 1973–1974

Personal details
- Died: 24 February 1974; Combined Military Hospital (Dhaka)
- Political party: Awami League

Mohammad Abdul Khaleq (Bengali: মোহাম্মদ আব্দুল খালেক; died in 1974) was a Bangladeshi politician and freedom fighter from Netrokona. He was a member of parliament for the Mymensingh-25 constituency as a part of the Awami League.

== Early life ==
Abdul Khaleq was born into a Bengali Muslim family in Mogalhata, Duoj Union, Netrokona District.

== Career ==
Khaleq was elected to parliament from Mymensingh-25 as an Awami League candidate in 1973.

== Death ==
Khaleq was shot outside his home in Moktarpara, Netrokona on 23 February 1974 and was subsequently taken to Combined Military Hospital (Dhaka) where he died.
