= Kamaruddin Ahmed =

Bangladeshi politician

- কামারুদ্দিন আহমেদ

Member of Bangladesh Parliament

Member of Parliament for Dinajpur-1
- In office 1973–1979
- Preceded by: Constituency initiated
- Succeeded by: Muhammad Jamiruddin Sircar

Personal details
- Party: Bangladesh Awami League

Kamaruddin Ahmed is a Bangladesh Awami League politician and a former member of parliament for Dinajpur-1.

== Career ==
Ahmed was elected to parliament from Dinajpur-1 as a Bangladesh Awami League candidate in 1973.
