= Shah Muhammad Zafarullah =

Bangladesh Awami League politician

Member of Bangladesh Parliament
- In office 1973–1976

Personal details
- Political party: Bangladesh Awami League

Shah Muhammad Zafarullah (Bengali: শাহ্ মোহাম্মদ জাফরুলাহ) is a Bangladesh Awami League politician and a former member of parliament for Rajshahi-13.

== Career ==
Zafarullah was elected to parliament from Rajshahi-13 as an Awami League candidate in 1973.
