= Muzaffar Ali (politician) =

Bangladeshi politician

Member of Bangladesh Parliament
- In office 1973–1976
- Succeeded by: Abdur Rashid

Personal details
- Died: 29 November 1998
- Party: Bangladesh Awami League

Muzaffar Ali was a Bangladesh Awami League politician and a member of parliament for Comilla-8.

== Career ==
Ali was elected to parliament from Comilla-8 as a Bangladesh Awami League candidate in 1973. He founded Muzaffar Ali Foundation and Muzaffar Ali High School and College.

== Death ==
Ali died on 29 November 1998 following cardiac failure.
