= Mainuddin Ahmed Manik =

Bangladeshi politician

Member of Bangladesh Parliament
- In office 7 March 1973 – 24 February 1975

Personal details
- Party: Jatiya Samajtantrik Dal

Mainuddin Ahmed Manik (Bengali: মাঈনুদ্দিন আহমেদ মানিক) is a Bangladesh Awami League politician and a former member of parliament for Rajshahi-11.

== Career ==
In the first national parliamentary election of 1973, he was elected as a member of parliament from the then Rajshahi-11 constituency, as a candidate of the Jatiya Samajtantrik Dal. When Bakshal was formed on 24 February 1975, he resigned from the post of member of parliament.
