= Sardar Mosharraf Hossain =

Bangladeshi politician

Member of the Bangladesh Parliament for Dinajpur-9
- In office 1973–1976
- Succeeded by: Shamsul Haque

Personal details
- Party: Bangladesh Awami League

Sardar Mosharraf Hossain was a Bangladesh Awami League politician and a member of parliament for Dinajpur-9.

== Career ==
Hossain was elected to parliament from Dinajpur-9 as a Bangladesh Awami League candidate in 1973.

== Death ==
Hossain died on 24 September 2017 at M Abdur Rahim Medical College and Hospital in Dinajpur.
