= Rafia Akhtar Dolly =

Bangladeshi politician

Member of Bangladesh Parliament
- In office 7 March 1973 – 6 November 1976

Personal details
- Political party: Awami League

Rafia Akhtar Dolly (Bengali: রাফিয়া আখতার ডলি) is a Awami League politician who was indirectly elected to a seat reserved for women in the Bangladesh Parliament in 1973.

== Career ==
Dolly was elected to a parliamentary seat reserved for women as an Awami League candidate in 1973. She was a member of the governing body of the Bangladesh Women's Rehabilitation and Welfare Foundation, formed by the government of Bangladesh for rehabilitation of women raped during the Bangladesh Liberation war.

Dolly is the president of Bangladesh Women Sports Federation.
