= Sadir Uddin Ahmed =

Bangladeshi politician

Member of Bangladesh Parliament
- In office 1973–1976

Personal details
- Party: Awami League

Sadir Uddin Ahmed (1931–27 August 2018) (Bengali: সাদির উদ্দিন আহমেদ) was a Awami League politician in Bangladesh and a former member of parliament for Mymensingh-21.

== Career ==
Ahmed was elected to parliament from Mymensingh-21 as an Awami League candidate in 1973.

== Death ==
Ahmed died on 27 August 2018.
