= Md Abul Hashem =

Bangladeshi politician (1922–2021)

Md Abul Hashem (1922 – 9 April 2021) was a Bangladeshi social worker. He was elected to the National Assembly of Pakistan in 1970. He was an organiser of the Bangladesh Liberation war in 1971. He was awarded the Ekushey Padak in 2011 for his social work. He died on 9 April 2021 at the age of 99.
