= Afzal Hossain (Narayanganj politician) =

Bangladeshi politician

Member of Bangladesh Parliament
- In office 1973–1976

Personal details
- Political party: Awami League

Afzal Hossain (Bengali: আফজাল হোসেন) is a Awami League politician in Bangladesh and a former member of parliament for Dhaka-29.

== Career ==
Hossain was elected to parliament from Dhaka-29 as an Awami League candidate in 1973.

== Death ==
Hossain died on 29 March 2007.
