= Hatem Ali Mia =

Bangladeshi soldier

- Born: Hatem Ali Mia

Hatem Ali Mia (17 February 1926 – 26 April 2005) was a language soldier of Bangladesh's language movement, provincial council member, valiant freedom fighter, veteran politician and member of Constituent Assembly. In 2024, he was posthumously awarded the "Ekushey Padak". He was one of the organizers and camp-in-charge of the liberation war. Former Deputy Secretary of Mymensingh District Awami League, Organizing Secretary of Mymensingh Sadar North Division Awami League and Founder General Secretary and Former President of Gouripur Thana Awami League.

== Awards and nominations ==
Year	category	Work	result	ref.
2024	Ekushey Padak		Won	
