= AKM Nurul Karim Khair =

Bangladeshi politician

Member of Bangladesh Parliament
- In office 1973–1976

Personal details
- Political party: Awami League

AKM Nurul Karim Khair (Bengali: এ কে এম নুরুল করিম খায়ের) is an Awami League politician in Bangladesh and a former member of parliament for Bakerganj-11.

== Career ==
Khair was elected to parliament from Bakerganj-11 as an Awami League candidate in 1973.
