= Nazrul Islam (Bhola politician) =

Bangladeshi politician (died 2012)

Member of Parliament for Bakerganj-2
- In office 1973–1975
- In office 1979–1982

Personal details
- Born: c. 1942
- Died: 28 October 2012 (aged 70)
- Party: Bangladesh Awami League

Nazrul Islam (c. 1942 – 28 October 2012) was a Bangladeshi politician from Bhola belonging to Bangladesh Awami League. He was elected twice as a member of the Jatiya Sangsad.

== Biography ==
Islam was elected as a member of the Pakistan National Assembly in 1970. He took part in the Liberation War of Bangladesh. He was elected as a member of the Jatiya Sangsad from Bakerganj-2 in 1973. He was also elected from that constituency in 1979. Later, he was elected as the chairman of Daulatkhan Upazila Parishad in 1986.

Islam died on 28 November 2012 at a hospital in Dhaka at the age of seventy.
