= Gopal Krishna Maharatna =

Bangladeshi politician

Gopal Krishna Maharatna was a Bengali politician from Habiganj. He was elected to the Provincial Assembly of East Pakistan from constituency Sylhet-XX in 1970 as a candidate of the All-Pakistan Awami League.

In October 1984, Maharatna was president of the general committee of a new high school planned in Baniachong Upazila. When it was inaugurated in January 1985, it was named Hussain Muhammad Ershad High School after the then-president. Later it was renamed Baniachong Adarsha High School.
