= Ahmed Ali (Bangladeshi politician) =

Bangladeshi lawyer and politician (1932–2020)

- Born: 1 March 1932; Nabinagar, Brahmanbaria, Bangladesh
- Died: 11 January 2020 (aged 87); Dhaka, Bangladesh
- Education: University of Dhaka
- Occupations: Lawyer, politician
- Political party: Bangladesh Awami League

Ahmed Ali (1 March 1932 – 11 January 2020) was a Bangladeshi politician and lawyer belonging to Bangladesh Awami League. He was elected as a member of the East Pakistan Provincial Assembly from Comilla-5. Later, he was appointed as a member of the Constituent Assembly of Bangladesh. He took part in the Language Movement. He was an organizer of the Liberation War of Bangladesh too.

== Biography ==
Ali was born on 1 March 1932 to a Bengali family in the village of Kajalia in Nabinagar, Tipperah District (now Brahmanbaria District, Bangladesh). The family later relocated to the Bagichagaon neighbourhood in Comilla city. He took part in the Language Movement. He completed his Bachelor of Laws degree from the University of Dhaka.

Ali was the founding vice president of Central Chhatra League.member Central Committee of Bangladesh Awami league, president and Secretary of cumilla zilla Awami league He took part in every movement against the Government of Pakistan from 1952 to 1971. He was elected as a member of the East Pakistan Provincial Assembly from Comilla-5 in 1970. Later, he was appointed as a member of the Constituent Assembly of Bangladesh. He was the first administrator of Comilla after the Liberation of Bangladesh.

Ali was an organizer of the Liberation War of Bangladesh. He hoisted the Flag of Bangladesh at Comilla Town Hall on 8 December 1971 after Comilla was clinched from the Pakistan Army.

Ali was the first elected vice chairman of the Bangladesh bar Council. He also wrote some books.

Ali died of prostate cancer in Apollo Hospital, Dhaka on 11 January 2020 at the age of 87.
