= Momtaz Begum (professor) =

Bangladeshi politician (died 2020)

Member of Parliament
- In office 1973–1976

Personal details
- Political party: Awami League
- Spouse: Syed Rezaur Rahman

Momtaz Begum (Bengali: মমতাজ বেগম) was a Bangladeshi politician, who served as a member of parliament for a reserved seat.

== Career ==
Begum was elected to the Constituent Assembly of Bangladesh in 1970. She was a former chairperson of Jatiya Mohila Sangstha and general secretary of the Bangladesh Mohila Awami League. She was elected to parliament from a reserved seat as an Awami League candidate in 1973.

== Personal life ==
She was married to Syed Rezaur Rahman, who was a member of the Awami League Advisory Council.

== Death ==
Begum died on 17 May 2020 in Bhooter Goli, Dhaka, Bangladesh.
