= Manzoor Ahmad Bachchu =

Bangladeshi politician

Member of Bangladesh Parliament
- In office 1973–1976

Personal details
- Party: Awami League

Manzoor Ahmad Bachchu (Bengali: মনজুর আহমদ বাচ্চু) is an Awami League politician in Bangladesh and a former member of parliament for Mymensingh-31.

== Career ==
Bachchu was elected to parliament from Mymensingh-31 as an Awami League candidate in 1973.
