= Badal Rashid =

Bangladeshi politician (1929–1993)

Member of Bangladesh Parliament
- In office 1973–1976

Personal details
- Born: 1929
- Died: 1993 (aged 63–64)
- Party: Awami League

Badal Rashid (1929–1993) (Bengali: বাদল রশীদ) was an Awami League politician and served as the former Member of Parliament for Kushtia-6.

== Career ==
Rashid was elected to parliament from Kushtia-6 as an Awami League candidate in 1973. He was a veteran of the Bangladesh Liberation war and an advocate.
