= Abdur Rashid (Mymensingh politician) =

Bangladeshi politician

Member of Parliament for Mymensingh-17
- In office 1973–1975
- Preceded by: Constituency Established
- Succeeded by: Mohammad Ali Osman Khan

Personal details
- Born: c. 1938
- Died: 14 May 2017 (aged 79)
- Party: Bangladesh Awami League

Abdur Rashid (c. 1938 – 14 May 2017) was a Bangladeshi academic and politician from Mymensingh belonging to Bangladesh Awami League. He was a member of the Jatiya Sangsad.

== Biography ==
Rashid was the principal of Nazrul Degree College. He was elected as a member of the Jatiya Sangsad from Mymensingh-17 in 1973.

Rashid died on 14 May 2017 at Central Hospital in Dhaka at the age of 79.
