= Abu Taleb Mia =

Bangladeshi politician

Member of Bangladesh Parliament
- In office 1973–1976

Personal details
- Born: 1936
- Died: May 16, 2007 (aged 70–71)
- Party: Awami League

Abu Taleb Mia (1936-16 May 2007) was a Awami League politician in Bangladesh and a member of parliament for Rangpur-18. He represented Gaibandha.

== Career ==
Mia was elected to parliament from Rangpur-18 as an Awami League candidate in 1973.

== Death ==
Mia died on 16 May 2007.
