= MA Latif =

Bangladeshi politician

Muhammad Abdul Latif

Member of 1st Jatiya Sangsad
- In office 7 March 1973 – 6 November 1976
- Succeeded by: Mohammad Abdul Haque
- Constituency: Sylhet-10

Personal details
- Born: Ganglazur, Zakiganj, Sylhet district
- Died: Bangladesh
- Political party: Awami League

Muhammad Abdul Latif (Bengali: মোহম্মদ আব্দুল লতিফ), also known as MA Latif, was a Bangladeshi politician and member of parliament. He represented the Awami League in the Sylhet-10 constituency following the country's first general elections.

== Early life and family ==
Abdul Latif was born into a Bengali Muslim family in the village of Ganglazur in Zakiganj (then under Karimganj subdivision), Sylhet district.

== Career ==
In the Pakistan period, Abdul Latif participated in the Bengali language movement and six point movement, and became a freedom fighter during the Bangladesh Liberation War. Following independence, the first general elections were held in 1973, with Abdul Latif winning as an Awami League candidate in the Sylhet-10 constituency.

He died in Bangladesh.
