= Harnath Bain =

Bangladeshi politician

Member of Bangladesh Parliament
- In office 1973–1976

Personal details
- Party: Awami League

Harnath Bain (Bengali: হরনাথ বাইন) is an Awami League politician and a former member of parliament for Bakerganj-12.

== Career ==
Bain was elected to parliament from Bakerganj-12 as an Awami League candidate in 1973.

Bain contested the 1991 parliamentary election from Barisal-2 as an Awami League candidate and lost the election to the Workers Party of Bangladesh candidate, Rashed Khan Menon.
