= Shamsul Hossain Sarkar =

Bangladeshi politician

Member of the Bangladesh Parliament for Rangpur-17
- In office 7 April 1973 – 6 November 1975
- Succeeded by: Mohammad Sirajul Haque

Personal details
- Party: Bangladesh Awami League

Shamsul Hossain Sarkar is a Bangladesh Awami League politician and a former member of parliament for Rangpur-17.

== Career ==
Sarkar was elected to the Provincial Assembly of East Pakistan in 1970 for Rangpur-XVII. He was elected to parliament from Rangpur-17 as an Awami League candidate in 1973.
