= K. M. Shamsul Huda =

Bangladesh Awami League politician

Member of Bangladesh Parliament
- In office 1973–1975
- Succeeded by: Md. Abdul Hai

Personal details
- Born: c. 1935
- Died: 16 December 2010 Dhaka, Bangladesh
- Party: Awami League
- Relatives: AHM Shamsuddin Chowdhury Manik (brother-in-law)

K. M. Shamsul Huda (c. 1935 – 16 December 2010) was an Awami League politician and a member of parliament of undivided Dhaka-8. He was one of the organizers of the Bangladesh Liberation War and political advisor of Sector 2.

== Early life ==
Shamsul Huda was born in c. 1935 in Gazaria Upazila of Munshiganj District.

== Career ==
Huda was an educationist and a member of the central executive committee of the Awami League. He was one of the organizers and political advisors of the Bangladesh Liberation War.

He was elected to parliament from undivided Dhaka-8 as a Bangladesh Awami League candidate in 1973.

He was the president of the Munshiganj District Awami League from 1973 to 1980.

== Personal life ==
Huda's cousin is Justice AHM Shamsuddin Chowdhury Manik.

== Death ==
Huda died on 16 December 2010 in Bangabandhu Sheikh Mujib Medical University, Dhaka, aged 75.
