= Gazi Fazlur Rahman =

Bangladeshi politician

Member of Bangladesh Parliament
- In office 1973–1976

Personal details
- Political party: Awami League

Gazi Fazlur Rahman (Bengali: গাজী ফজলুর রহমান; died in 1974) was an Awami League politician in Bangladesh and member of the Parliament of Bangladesh for Dhaka-22.

== Career ==
Rahman was elected to parliament for Dhaka-22 as an Awami League candidate in 1973.

== Death ==
Rahman was killed on 16 March 1974 in Narsingdi. He was the first member of parliament from Awami League to be killed after the independence of Bangladesh.
