= Abdul Wahab (Awami League politician) =

Bangladeshi politician

Member of Bangladesh Parliament
- In office 1973–1976
- Succeeded by: Anisul Islam Mahmud

Personal details
- Died: 29 October 2011
- Political party: Awami League

Abdul Wahab was an Awami League politician in Bangladesh and a member of parliament for Chittagong-5.

== Career ==
Wahab was elected to parliament from Chittagong-5 as an Awami League candidate in 1973.

== Death ==
Wahab died on 29 October 2011.
