= Abdus Sattar (Comilla politician) =

Bangladeshi politician

Member of Bangladesh Parliament
- In office 7 March 1973 – 6 November 1976

Personal details
- Party: Awami League

Abdus Sattar (Bengali: আবদুস সাত্তার) is a Awami League politician in Bangladesh and a former member of parliament for Comilla-21.

== Career ==
Sattar was elected to parliament from Comilla-21 as an Awami League candidate in 1973.
