= Osman Sarwar Alam Chowdhury =

Bangladeshi politician

Member of Parliament

Personal details
- Party: Bangladesh Awami League

Osman Sarwar Alam Chowdhury was a Bangladesh Awami League politician, diplomat, and a former Member of Parliament from Cox's Bazar-3.

== Early life ==
Chowdhury completed an M.A. in international relations at the University of Dhaka. He was also engaged in student politics.

== Career ==
Chowdhury served in the Constituent Assembly of Bangladesh and is a signatory to the framing of the constitution in 1972. In 1973, he led the first Bangladeshi delegation to Saudi Arabia for the Hajj. In 1996, he joined the foreign service of Bangladesh. In 1996 he was appointed the Bangladesh Ambassador to the UAE, where he served till 2001.

== Death ==
Chowdhury died in August 2010.
