= Siddique Hossain =

Bangladeshi politician

Member of Bangladesh Parliament
- In office 1973–1976

Personal details
- Political party: Bangladesh Awami League

Siddique Hossain is a Bangladesh Awami League politician and a former member of parliament for Rangpur-8.

== Career ==
Hossain was a freedom fighter during the Bangladesh Liberation War.

He was elected to parliament from Rangpur-8 as a Bangladesh Awami League candidate in 1973.
