= Shamsuddin Mollah =

Bangladeshi politician

Member of Bangladesh Parliament
- In office 1973–1976

Personal details
- Political party: Awami League

Shamsuddin Mollah (1921-1991) (Bengali: শামসুদ্দীন মোল্লা) is a Awami League politician in Bangladesh and a former member of parliament for Faridpur-8.

== Career ==
Mollah was elected to parliament from Faridpur-8 as an Awami League candidate in 1973.

== Personal life ==
Mollha's son, MM Shahriar Rumi, was a Bangladesh Nationalist Party politician and member of the central committee of the Party. He retired from politics in November 2015.
