= Sirajul Islam (Noakhali politician) =

Bangladeshi politician (1935–2019)

Member of Bangladesh Parliament
- In office 7 March 1973 – 6 November 1976

Personal details
- Political party: Awami League

Sirajul Islam (1935 - 29 August 2019) (Bengali: সিরাজুল ইসলাম) is a Awami League politician in Bangladesh and a former member of parliament for Noakhali-13.

== Career ==
Islam was elected to parliament from Noakhali-13 as an Awami League candidate in 1973.
