= Hamiduzzaman Sarkar =

Bangladesh Awami League politician

Member of Bangladesh Parliament
- In office 1973–1976

Personal details
- Party: Bangladesh Awami League

Hamiduzzaman Sarkar is a Bangladesh Awami League politician and a former member of parliament for Rangpur-10.

== Career ==
Sarkar was elected to parliament from Rangpur-10 as an Awami League candidate in 1973.
