= Jalal Ahmed (politician) =

Bangladeshi politician

Member of Bangladesh Parliament
- In office 7 March 1973 – 6 November 1976

Personal details
- Born: 2 July 1921
- Died: 14 January 2009 (aged 87)
- Party: Awami League

Jalal Ahmed (Bengali: জালাল আহমদ) was an Awami League politician and a member of parliament for Comilla-19.

== Career ==
Ahmed was elected to parliament from Comilla-19 as an Awami League candidate in 1973.

He died on 14 January 2009.
