= Toabur Rahim =

Bangladeshi politician (died 2021)

Bangladesh Parliament
- In office 7 March 1973 – 6 November 1976

Personal details
- Died: 31 December 2020 London, United Kingdom
- Party: Awami League

Toabur Rahim (Bengali: তোয়াবুর রহিম) was an Awami League politician in Bangladesh and a member of parliament for Sylhet-14.

== Career ==
Rahim was elected to parliament from Sylhet-14 as an Awami League candidate in 1973.

== Death ==
Rahim died on 31 December 2020, in London, United Kingdom, after catching COVID-19 during the pandemic in England.
