= Waliur Rahman =

Bangladeshi diplomat and politician

- ওয়ালিউর রহমান
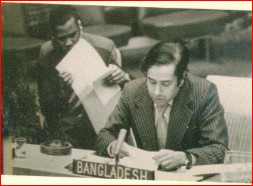
- Addressing the United Nations General Assembly

Ambassador of Bangladesh to Italy
- In office 5 September 1986 – 14 February 1993
- Preceded by: Reaz Rahman
- Succeeded by: Khurshid Hamid

Personal details
- Born: 26 December 1942 Jhenaidah, Bengal Province, British India
- Died: 29 November 2023 (aged 80) Dhaka, Bangladesh
- Party: Awami League

Waliur Rahman (26 December 1942 – 29 November 2023) was a Bangladeshi diplomat serving as an ambassador of Bangladesh to Italy during 1986–1993.

== Background ==
Waliur Rahman was born on 26 December 1942 in Kancherkol village in Shailkupa of Jhenaidah district in the then British India. His great-grandfather was a close associate of Haji Shariatullah, the leader of the Faraizi movement.

== Career ==
After graduation, Rahman joined the Ministry of Foreign Affairs of Pakistan in 1966. In 1968, he was first posted in Delhi and later in Kolkata. But finally, he was sent to Indonesia. His colleagues in Jakarta were Humayun Rashid Chowdhury and Shah A M S Kibria. He was then transferred to Switzerland.

Rahman resigned from Pakistan Government in 1971 and set up Bangladesh Mission for Bangladesh government in exile as a refugee for 9 months.

Rahman was the chairman of Bangladesh Heritage Foundation which he had founded. He served as Special Envoy of Prime Minister Sheikh Hasina during 1997-1998. He was an Executive Director of Bangladesh Institute of Law and International Affairs (BILIA). He was a member of the think tank, the International Institute for Strategic Studies (IISS).

Rahman wrote his autobiographical book, Diplomatic World, Forgotten War, Forgotten Genocide and Brief History of the Framing of the International Crimes (Tribunals) Act, 1973., and Pakistan on the Brink: A Civilizational Quest.

== Death ==
On 29 November 2023, Rahman died of cardiac arrest at LabAid Hospital in Dhaka.
