= Imam Uddin Ahmad =

Bangladeshi politician and freedom fighter

Imamuddin Ahmad

Member of Bangladesh Parliament
- In office 1973–1976

Personal details
- Born: 2 July 1935 Faridpur
- Died: 12 February 2006 (aged 70) Dhaka following a road accident in Faridpur
- Party: Awami League
- Spouse(s): Rushema Imam, MP

Imamuddin Ahmad (Bengali: ইমামউদ্দিন আহমাদ) was a Awami League politician in Bangladesh and a member of parliament for Faridpur-5 (present day Faridpur-3).

== Early life ==
Ahmad was born in 1935 in Faridpur District, East Bengal, British India.

== Career ==
Ahmad was involved with the Bengali Language movement in 1952. He was elected to parliament from Faridpur-5 as an Awami League candidate in 1973. After the assassination of Sheikh Mujibur Rahman he was appointed the president of the Faridpur District unit of the Awami League.

== Death ==
Ahmad died on 12 February 2006.
