= Abul Hashem (Mymensingh politician) =

Bangladeshi politician (1930–2022)

- আবুল হাসেম

Member of Parliament for Mymensingh-19
- In office 1973–1976

Personal details
- Born: 17 August 1930 Gafargaon, Bengal Presidency, British India
- Died: 2 February 2022 (aged 91)
- Political party: Awami League

Abul Hashem (17 August 1930 – 2 February 2022) was a Bangladeshi Awami League politician. He served as a member of parliament for the (now defunct) Mymensingh-19 constituency.

== Life and career ==
Abul Hashem was born on 17 August 1930. He was elected to parliament from Dhaka-11 as an Awami League candidate in 1973.

In February 2020, the Bangla Tribune reported that Hashem was unable to receive medical treatment due to financial problems. Hashem died on 2 February 2022, at the age of 91.
