= Shamsul Haq =

Bangladeshi politician (1927–1998)

- শমসুল হক

Minister of Local Government, Rural Development and Cooperatives
- In office April 1972 – March 1973

Personal details
- Born: 1 March 1927 Thengarbandh, Gazipur, Dacca district, Bengal Province
- Died: 16 June 1998 (aged 71) Bangabandhu Sheikh Mujib Medical University
- Party: Awami League
- Education: University of Dacca

Shamsul Haq (Bengali: শমসুল হক; 1 March 1927 – 16 June 1998) is a Bangladesh Awami League politician and the former Minister of Local Government, Rural Development and Co-operatives from April 1972 to March 1973.
