= Altafur Rahman Chowdhury =

Bangladeshi politician

Member of Bangladesh Parliament
- In office 7 March 1973 – 6 November 1976

Personal details
- Died: 21 November 2018 (aged 87) Kissimmee, Florida
- Party: Awami League

Altafur Rahman Chowdhury (Bengali: আলতাফুর রহমান চৌধুরী; died 21 November 2018) was an Awami League politician in Bangladesh and a former member of parliament for Sylhet-15.

== Biography ==
Chowdhury was elected to the Provincial Assembly of East Pakistan for Sylhet-XV in 1970. During the Bangladesh Liberation War, he helped raise money to feed and clothe thousands of freedom fighters. Chowdhury was elected to parliament from Sylhet-15 as an Awami League candidate in 1973.

Chowdhury died on 21 November 2018 in Kissimmee, Florida, aged 87.
