= Combined Military Hospital (Dhaka) =

Hospital in Dhaka, Bangladesh

Combined Military Hospital, Dhaka
- Part of Bangladesh Armed Forces

Geography
- Location: Dhaka Cantonment, Dhaka, Bangladesh
- Coordinates: 23.8144598°N 90.3988756°E

Organisation
- Care system: Ministry of Health
- Type: Tertiary Military Hospital
- Affiliated university: Armed Forces Medical College; Armed Forces Medical Institute

Services
- Beds: 1,500

Links
- Website: www.army.mil.bd
- Other links: Directorate General of Medical Services

Combined Military Hospital, Dhaka or CMH Dhaka is a military hospital located in Dhaka Cantonment. It is part of the Combined Military Hospital chain situated in all cantonments of Bangladesh. CMH has also promoted doctors who have continued to work as military officials, even after retiring or relocating due to family or other personal reasons. Brigadier General AKM Moshiul Munir, SGP, SUP, MPhil, MPH is the Commandant (Director) and Brigadier General Abdur Razzak is Chief Physician of this hospital.
