= Kazi Akbar Uddin Mohammad Siddique =

Bangladeshi politician

Member of Bangladesh Parliament
- In office 1973–1975
- Succeeded by: Mozammel Haque

Personal details
- Died: 15 August 2004
- Resting place: Srirampur, Nabinagar Upazila, Brahmanbaria District
- Party: Bangladesh Awami League

Kazi Akbar Uddin Mohammad Siddique (died 2004) was a Bangladesh Awami League politician and a member of parliament for Comilla-6.

== Career ==
Siddique was elected to parliament from Comilla-6 as a Bangladesh Awami League candidate in 1973. He died on 15 August 2004.
