= Kazi Sahabuddin Ahmed =

Bangladeshi politician

Member of Bangladesh Parliament
- In office 1973–1976

Personal details
- Party: Awami League

Kazi Sahabuddin Ahmed (Bengali: কাজী সাহাবুদ্দিন আহমেদ) is an Awami League politician in Bangladesh and a former member of parliament for Dhaka-26.

== Career ==
Ahmed was elected to parliament from Dhaka-26 as an Awami League candidate in 1973.
