= MA Quddus =

Bangladeshi politician

Member of Bangladesh Parliament
- In office 1973–1976

Personal details
- Party: Awami League

MA Quddus (Bengali: এম এ কুদ্দুস) is an Awami League politician in Bangladesh and a former member of parliament for Mymensingh-29.

== Career ==
Quddus was elected to parliament from Mymensingh-29 as an Awami League candidate in 1973.
