= Kuber Chandra Biswas =

Bangladeshi politician

Member of Bangladesh Parliament
- In office 1973–1979
- Succeeded by: Prafulla Kumar Shil

Personal details
- Born: 1917
- Died: 1980
- Party: Bangladesh Awami League

Kuber Chandra Biswas is a Bangladesh Awami League politician and a former member of parliament for Khulna-5.

== Career ==
Biswas started his career as a judicial magistrate in then united Bengal in 1944. He retired as district judge of Barisal in 1966 and started practice as a pleader in the Dacca High Court. He was elected to East Pakistan Assembly in 1970 and simultaneously as Bar Council deputy secretary. He was elected to parliament from Khulna-5 as a Bangladesh Awami League candidate in 1973.

He died in 1980.
