= Aminul Islam Danesh Mia =

Bangladeshi politician

Member of Bangladesh Parliament
- In office 1973–1976

Personal details
- Born: October 20, 1919
- Died: January 23, 2006 (aged 86)
- Party: Bangladesh Awami League

Aminul Islam Danesh Mia (1919–2006) was a Bangladesh Awami League politician and a member of parliament for Faridpur-15.

== Early life ==
Mia was born on 20 October 1919 in Kabirajkandi village, Shariatpur District, East Bengal, British India.

== Career ==
Mia was elected to parliament from Faridpur-15 as a Bangladesh Awami League candidate in 1973. He was a member of the Constituent Assembly of Bangladesh.

== Death ==
Mia died on 23 January 2006.
