= Zahur Ahmad Chowdhury =

Bangladeshi politician (1916–1974)

Minister of Health and Family Welfare

Personal details
- Born: 1916
- Died: 1 July 1974 (aged 57–58)
- Political party: Bangladesh Awami League

Zahur Ahmad Chowdhury (1916 – 1974) was a Bangladesh Awami League politician and a former Minister of Health and Family Welfare.

== Early life ==
Zahur Ahmad Chowdhury was born in Uttar Kattali, Chittagong in 1916. He studied in Kattali Nurul Huq Chowdhury High School and Pahartali Railway High School, and went on to Calcutta Islamia College.

== Career ==
He joined the All-India Muslim League in 1940. He was one of the founding members Awami Muslim League in 1949. He was a labour activist and was the assistant secretary of Trade Union Federation. He was active in the Language Movement. In 1954 he was elected to the Legislative Assembly from the united front representing Chittagong centre. He supported the Six point movement and was imprisonment for it. In 1970 he elected to Provincial Assembly from Kotwali, Chittagong from the Awami League.

He was a member of the Sangram Committee in Chittagong in March 1971. He went to Agartala, India after the start of Bangladesh Liberation war. He was elected chairman of the Regional Council South-East Region-2 of the Provisional Government of Bangladesh. In the first cabinet of Bangladesh he was the minister of Labour and Social Welfare. In 1973 he was elected to the Jatiya Sangsad from Kotwali Panchlaish Bangladesh Awami League in 1973. He was appointed the Health Minister. He was secretary of Labour Affairs in the central committee of Bangladesh Awami League.

== Death ==
He died on 1 July 1974 in Dhaka, Bangladesh. He has been remembered in the naming of the Zohur Ahmed Chowdhury Stadium in Chittagong. After the Bangladesh Nationalist Party came to power they renamed the stadium to Bir Shrestha Shahid Ruhul Amin Stadium. The Bangladesh Awami League government returned the stadium to its original name after it came to power.
