= Golam Morshed Farooqi =

Bangladeshi politician

Member of Bangladesh Parliament
- In office 7 March 1973 – 6 November 1976

Personal details
- Born: 29 August 1930 Chandpur District, British India
- Died: 11 January 2014 (aged 83) Dhaka, Bangladesh
- Party: Awami League

Golam Morshed Farooqi (Bengali: গোলাম মোর্শেদ ফারকী; 29 August 1930 – 11 January 2014) was an Awami League politician and a former member of parliament for Comilla-23.

== Career ==
Farooqi was elected to parliament from Comilla-23 as an Awami League candidate in 1973.
