= Abdul Majid Tara Mia =

Bangladeshi politician

Member of Bangladesh Parliament
- In office 1973–1976

Personal details
- Party: Awami League

Abdul Majid Tara Mia (Bengali: আব্দুল মজিদ তারা মিয়া; 1925–1988) is a Awami League politician in Bangladesh and a former member of parliament for Mymensingh-20.

== Career ==
Mia was elected to parliament from Mymensingh-20 as an Awami League candidate in 1973.
