= Mostafa MA Matin =

Bangladeshi politician

Member of Bangladesh Parliament
- In office 1973–1976

Personal details
- Party: Awami League

Mostafa MA Matin (Bengali: মোস্তফা এম এ মতিন; 1 August 1938 – 27 February 2004) was an Awami League politician in Bangladesh and a member of parliament for Mymensingh-18.

== Career ==
Matin was elected to parliament from Mymensingh-18 as an Awami League candidate in 1973. He contested and lost the parliamentary elections in 1991 from Mymensingh-11.

On 22 January 2022, Matin was awarded the Ekushey Padak, the second most important award for civilians in Bangladesh.
