= Abdul Awal (Rangpur politician) =

Bangladeshi politician

Member of Bangladesh Parliament
- In office 1973–1976

Personal details
- Political party: Bangladesh Awami League

Abdul Awal is a Bangladesh Awami League politician in Bangladesh and a former member of parliament for Rangpur-9.

== Career ==
Awal was elected to parliament from Rangpur-9 as a Bangladesh Awami League candidate in 1973.
