= Khitish Chandra Mondal =

Bangladeshi politician (1939–2020)

- ক্ষিতীশ চন্দ্র মন্ডল

Member of Parliament from Bbakerganj-15

Personal details
- Born: 13 October 1939 Pirojpur District
- Died: 9 March 2020 (aged 80) Pirojpur
- Party: Bangladesh Awami League

Khitish Chandra Mondal (13 October 1939 – 9 March 2020) was a Bangladesh Awami League politician. He served as the minister of state for relief and rehabilitation in the third Sheikh Mujib cabinet.

== Birth and early life ==
Khitish Chandra Mondal was born on 13 October 1939 in Pirojpur District.

== Death ==
Khitish Chandra Mondal died on 9 March 2020.
