= Enayet Ali Sana =

Bangladeshi politician

Member of Bangladesh Parliament
- In office 1973–1976

Personal details
- Party: Awami League

Enayet Ali Sana (Bengali: এনায়েত আলী সানা) is a Awami League politician and a former member of parliament for Khulna-8.

== Career ==
Sana was elected to parliament from Khulna-8 as an Awami League candidate in 1973.
