= Kudratullah Mandal =

Bangladeshi politician

Kudrat Ullah Mandal

Member of Bangladesh Parliament
- In office 1970–1976
- Succeeded by: Habib Ullah Sarkar

Personal details
- Party: Bangladesh Awami League

Kudrat Ullah Mandal was a Bangladesh Awami League politician and a member of parliament for Mymensingh-1.

== Career ==
Mandal was elected to parliament from Mymensingh-9 as a Bangladesh Awami League candidate in 1973.

At the conclusion of a 2012 exhibition in Mymensingh of photographs recollecting the Bangladesh Liberation War, he was posthumously awarded a crest for his contribution to the war.

He had a younger brother, Akram Hossain Mandal, who served two terms as chairman of Haluaghat Union Parishad.
