= Fazlul Haque Talukdar =

Bangladeshi politician

Member of Bangladesh Parliament
- In office 1973–1976

Personal details
- Political party: Awami League

Fazlul Haque Talukdar (Bengali: ফজলুল হক তালুকদার) is a Awami League politician and a former member of parliament for Bakerganj-9.

== Career ==
Talukdar was elected to parliament from Bakerganj-9 as an Awami League candidate in 1973.
