= Shamsul Haque Chowdhury (Rangpur politician) =

Bangladeshi politician

Member of Bangladesh Parliament
- In office 1973–1976

Personal details
- Party: Bangladesh Awami League

Shamsul Haque Chowdhury was a Bangladesh Awami League politician and a member of parliament for Rangpur-12.

== Career ==
Chowdhury was elected to parliament from Rangpur-12 as an Awami League candidate in 1973. He was elected to parliament from Rangpur-13 as a Awami League candidate in 1979. He died on 7 May 2008.
