= Abdul Awal (Comilla politician) =

Bangladeshi politician

Member of Bangladesh Parliament
- In office 7 March 1973 – 6 November 1976

Personal details
- Party: Awami League

Abdul Awal (Bengali: আব্দুল আউয়াল) is a Awami League politician in Bangladesh and a former member of parliament for Comilla-20.

== Career ==
Awal was elected to parliament from Comilla-20 as an Awami League candidate in 1973.
