= Haqq (surname) =

- Pronunciation: Arabic: [ħaqq]
- Language: Arabic

Origin
- Derivation: Haqq
- Meaning: Truth
- Region of origin: Arab world, Muslim world

Other names
- Alternative spelling: Ḥaqq, Haq, Haque, Hoq, Hoque, Huq, Huque

Haqq is a surname of Arabic origin commonly found in the Indian subcontinent but also in other parts of the Muslim world.

== Etymology ==
Haqq originates from the Arabic word for truth or reality. It is commonly used as a suffix of a personal name. Al-Haqq (The Ultimate Reality) is one of the Names of God in Islam, and used in the second half of a compound name, commonly succeeding Abd or Abdul to make Abdul Haq. This specific compound name, means "servant of the Truth", and gives rise to the Muslim theophoric names.

== Variants ==
- In Afghanistan – Haq, Ul-Haq, Al-Haq, Haque, Haqqani
- In Bangladesh – Haq, Hoq, Huq, Hague, Hogue, Haque, Hoque, Huque, Ul-Haque
- In India – Haq, Haqq, Haque, Ul-Haq, Ul-Haque, Al-Haq, Hoq, Huq, Hoque, Huque
- In Indonesia – Haq, Haqq, Haque,
- In Iran – Haq, Haqq, Haqeq, Haqeqe, Haqqani
- In Malaysia – Haq, Haque, Ul-Haque
- In Pakistan – Haq, Haqq, Haque, Ul-Haq, Ul-Haque, Haqqani

== Notables with the surname ==
=== Haq ===
- Aaminah Haq (born 1972), Pakistani model
- Ameerah Haq, Bangladeshi diplomat
- Fazle Haq (1928–1991), Pakistani general and governor of Khyber-Pakhtunkhwa province
- Gad al-Haq (1917–1996), Grand Imam of Al-Azhar
- Gary Haq, British human ecologist
- Inzamam-ul-Haq (born 1970), Pakistani cricketer
- Iram Haq (born 1976), Pakistani-Norwegian actress and filmmaker
- Kiran Haq (born 1988), Pakistani actress and model
- M. Azizul Haq (1940 or 1941–2025), Bangladeshi police officer, inspector general
- Mahbub ul Haq (1934–1998), Pakistani economist
- Mansurul Haq (1937–2018), Pakistani former admiral
- Mehr Abdul Haq (1915–1995), Pakistani linguist
- Misbah-ul-Haq (born 1974), Pakistani cricketer
- Naveen-ul-Haq (born 1999), Afghan cricketer
- Nawaz Haq (born 1981), Pakistani athlete
- Nomanul Haq, Pakistani-American historian
- Qazi Imdadul Haq (1882–1926), Bangladeshi writer
- Sami-ul-Haq (1937–2018), Pakistani religious scholar
- Shameemul Haq (born 1955), Indian politician
- Ubaidul Haq, (former) Bangladeshi khatib of Baitul Mukarram
- Waheedul Haq (1933–2007), Bangladeshi writer and journalist
- Wahidul Haq (1933–2020), Bangladeshi politician
- Zain Haq, Pakistani climate activist
- Zia ul Haq (1924–1988) Former President of Pakistan and Former Army chief of Pakistan

=== Haque ===
- Adil Ahmad Haque (born 1979/1980), Indian professor and international law scholar
- Aghniny Haque (born 1997), Indonesian actress, model, former taekwondo athlete
- Ariful Haque Choudhury (born 1959), former mayor of Sylhet, Bangladesh
- Athar ul-Haque Malik (better known as Art Malik, born 1952), British Pakistani actor
- Azizul Haque (Naxalite activist) (1942–2025), Indian revolutionary, writer, and veteran Naxalite leader
- Enamul Haque (born 1966), Bangladeshi former cricketer
- Fareed Haque (born 1963), American jazz guitarist
- Intisar-ul-Haque (1935–1996), Pakistani philosopher
- Marissa Haque (1962–2024), Indonesian actress and politician
- Mohammad Asrarul Haque (1942–2018), Indian politician
- Mohammad Mozammel Haque, retired two-star admiral in Bangladesh Navy
- Mohammad Nurul Haque (1915–1998), Bangladesh Awami League politician
- Mozammel Haque (disambiguation), multiple people
- Muhammad Nurul Haque (1907–1987), Bangladeshi cultural activist, social worker, writer
- Naeemul Haque (1949–2020), Pakistani politician
- Rashida Haque Choudhury (1926–unknown), Indian politician
- Syed Aminul Haque (born 1962), Pakistani politician
- Syed Shamsul Haque (1935–2016), Bangladeshi writer
- Tafazzul Haque Habiganji (1938–2020), former vice-president of Hefazat-e-Islam and Jamiat Ulema-e-Islam
- Ziaul Haque (died 1998), Pakistani scholar of economic history and Islamic studies
- Zulkiflee Anwar Haque (born 1962), Malaysian political cartoonist

=== Hoque ===
- Ajmeri Hoque, American judge of Bangladeshi descent
- Aminul Hoque MBE, British-Bangladeshi writer and lecturer at Goldsmiths, University of London
- Anisul Hoque, Bangladeshi writer
- Ehsan Hoque, American-Bengali doctor
- Farzana Hoque, Bangladeshi cricketer
- Kazi Shamsul Hoque, Bangladeshi journalist
- Mazibul Hoque, Bangladeshi politician
- Moinul Hoque Choudhury, five-time MLA, two-time UN General Assembly representative and Indian Minister of Industrial Development
- Najrul Hoque, Indian-Bengali politician
- Rabiul Hoque, Bangladeshi cricketer
- Saiful Hoque, Bangladeshi politician
- Zohurul Hoque, Bangladeshi Islamic scholar
- Zubair Hoque, British-Bangladeshi racer

=== Huq ===
- A. K. Fazlul Huq (1873–1962), Bangladeshi statesman and jurist
- Konnie Huq (born 1975), British television & radio presenter and screenwriter
- Mohammad Mozammel Huq (1860–1933), Indian Bengali-language poet and novelist
- Muhammad Shamsul Huq (1911–2006), Bangladeshi academic and former Minister of Foreign Affairs
- Nasreen Pervin Huq (1958–2006), Bangladeshi women's activist and campaigner for women's rights and social justice
- Nazmul Huq (1938–1971), Bangladeshi commander
- Nurul Huq Bhuiyan, Bangladeshi professor and activist
- Rupa Huq (born 1972), British writer and politician
- Shamsul Huq (1918–1965), Bengali politician

== Arabic-based compound names with Haqq as an element ==
- Abdul Haq
- Aminul Haque (name)
- Anisul Huq
- Anwar ul Haq
- Azizul Haque (disambiguation)
- Fazlul Haq
- Imdadul Haq (includes "Emdadul Haq" etc.)
- Inam-ul-Haq (includes "Enamul Haq" etc.)
- Izhar ul Haq (disambiguation)
- Mahbubul Haq
- Mahfuzul Haque (disambiguation)
- Mahmudul Haque (disambiguation)
- Mizanul Haque
- Mozammel Haque (disambiguation)
- Nur ul-Haq (disambiguation)
- Rezaul Haque (disambiguation)
- Serajul Huq (disambiguation)
- Shams ul Haq (disambiguation)
- Zahurul Haque

== Organizations ==
- Haque Academy, co-educational school based in the Defence Housing Authority in Karachi, Pakistan
