= Muzzammil (name) =

Muzzammil (Arabic: مزّمّل; transliterations vary) is an Arabic name from Al-Muzzammil, a name of Muhammad mentioned in the Qur'an. Notable people with the name include:

== Given name ==
- Mohammad Mozammel Huq (1860–1933), Bengali poet, novelist and magistrate
- Muhammad Muzammil Ullah Khan Sherwani (1865–1935), Indian aristocrat
- Mozammel Haque (disambiguation), multiple people
- Mozammel Haque Samaji (1937–1984), Bangladeshi educationist and politician
- Mozammel Hossain (1940–2020), Bangladeshi social welfare minister
- Muzamil Abdullayev (1941–2022), winemaker from Ganja
- Mozammel Hossain Lalu (1942–2014), Bangladeshi politician
- Muzammil H. Siddiqi (born 1943), American Islamic scholar, academic and author
- AKM Mozammel Haque (born 1946), Bangladeshi Liberation War Affairs minister
- Muhammad Muzammil Basyuni (born 1947), Indonesian diplomat
- Md. Muzammel Hossain (born 1947), 20th Chief Justice of Bangladesh
- A. J. M. Muzammil (born 1949), Sri Lankan politician and former Mayor of Colombo
- Mozammel Haque (disambiguation), multiple people
- Muzammil-ur-Rashid Abbasi (born 1961), prince of Bahawalpur
- Muzammil Hussain Kapadia (1961–2022), Pakistani Islamic scholar
- Muzammil Akhtar Shabbir (born 1969), Pakistani jurist
- Muzamil Jaleel (born 1972), Kashmiri journalist
- Muzammil Illyas (born 1974), Sri Lankan cricketer
- Mozammal Haque (born 1978), Bangladeshi kabaddi player
- Muhammad Muzammil Qureshi (born 1979), Pakistani politician
- Abdul Rehman Muzammil (born 1979), Pakistani cricketer
- Muzammil Nizam (born 1990), Pakistani cricketer
- Muzammil Hussain (born 1993), Pakistani footballer
- Muzammil Murtaza (born 1999), Pakistani tennis player
- Muzamil Sherzad (born 2002), Afghan-Irish cricketer
- Mozammel Haque Wadud Mia (died 1985), Bangladeshi politician
- Muzammil Shah (born 1997), Pakistani cricketer
- ASM Mozammel Haque, Bangladeshi politician
- Muzammil Hussain, Pakistani army officer
- Mozammel Haque Kaptan Mia, Bangladeshi politician
- Mohammad Mozammel Haque (born 1964), retired admiral of Bangladesh Navy
- Kazi Mozammel Haque, Bangladeshi politician

== See also ==
- Muddathir (disambiguation)
