= Imdad =

Imdad is a given name of Arabic origin. Notable people with the name include:

== Given name ==
- Imdad Imam Asar, (1849–1933), Indian writer and critic
- Syed Emdad Ali (1875–1956), Bengali poet and author
- Imdad Ali Imam Ali Kazi (1886–1968), Pakistani philosopher, jurist, and educationist
- Imdad al-Rashid Sabri (1914–1988), Indian journalist
- Imdad Hossain (1926–2011), Bangladeshi artist
- Imdad Hussaini (1940–2022), Pakistani poet and writer
- Imdaad Hamid (1944–2022), Indonesian mayor
- C. Emdad Haque (born 1954), Canadian-Bangladeshi environmentalist
- Imdad Ali Pitafi (born 1973), Pakistani politician
- Imdad Chandio, Pakistani politician
- Khodeza Emdad Lata, Bangladeshi politician
- Imdad Khan (1848–1920), sitar and surbahar player

== Compound names ==
- Imdadullah
  - Imdadullah Muhajir Makki (1817–1899), Indian Islamic scholar
  - Imdad Ullah Bosal (born 1970), Pakistani civil servant
- Imdadul Haq, multiple people
- Imdadul Bari
  - Syed Emdadul Bari (1935–2020), Bangladeshi politician and lawyer
  - Muhammad Emdad-Ul-Bari (born 1965), Bangladeshi major general

== See also ==
- Imdad al-Fatawa, Islamic book
