= Mozammel Haque =

Mozammel Haque (Bengali: মোজাম্মেল হক) is a Bengali masculine given name of Arabic origin. It may refer to:

- Mohammad Mozammel Huq (1860–1933), poet, novelist and magistrate
- Mohammad Mozammel Haq (1883–1976), poet and politician
- Mozammel Haque (politician, born 1928) (1928–2017), industrialist and politician from Chuadanga
- Md. Mozammel Haque (1935–2018), lawyer and politician from Sirajganj
- Mozammel Haque Samaji (1937–1984), educationist and politician
- AKM Mozammel Haque (born 1946), Liberation War Affairs minister
- Mozammel Haque (Natore politician) (1953–2023), politician
- Md Mozammel Haque Khan (born 1959), president of Bangladesh Karate Federation
- Mozammil Haque (1960–1972), martyr of the Assam medium movement
- Mozammel Haque (police officer) (born 1968), Deputy Inspector General of Bangladesh Police
- Mozammal Haque (born 1978), kabaddi player
- Mozammel Haque (Comilla politician) (died 1985), politician
- ASM Mozammel Haque, politician
- Mozammel Haque (Bangladesh National Awami Party politician), politician
- Mohammad Mozammel Haque, retired admiral of Bangladesh Navy
- Kazi Mozammel Haque, politician
- Mozammel Haque Babu, chief editor of Ekattor TV
- Mozammil Haque (1960–1972), Assamese martyr

== See also ==
- Muzzammil (disambiguation)
- Haqq (surname)
