= Zahurul Islam =

Zahurul Islam (Bengali: জহূরুল ইসলাম) is a Bengali masculine given name of Arabic origin and may refer to:

== People ==
- Jahurul Islam Talukdar (born 1922), Bangladeshi politician
- Jahurul Islam (1928–1995), Bangladeshi entrepreneur
- Zahurul Islam Khan, Bangladeshi politician
- Mohammad Jahurul Islam Omi (born 1986), Bangladeshi cricketer
- Zaheer-ul-Islam, Pakistan Army general
- Zahirul Islam Abbasi, Pakistan Army general
- Zahirul Islam (politician), Indian politician
- Muhammad Zahirul Islam, Bangladesh Army general
- Md. Zahurul Islam, Bangladeshi politician
- Mohammad Zahirul Islam, Bangladeshi politician

== See also ==
- Jahurul Islam Medical College, a private medical school in Bangladesh
- Zahurul Haque (disambiguation)
