= Ziaul =

Ziaul is a given name. Notable people with the name include:

- Ziaul Ahsan SBP, 2 Star rank Bangladesh Army officer
- A. K. M. Ziaul Ameen, Member of the 3rd National Assembly of Pakistan
- Ziaul Faruq Apurba (born 1983), Bangladeshi model and actor
- Sayed Ziaul Haq (1928–1988), Sufi saint of the Maizbhanderi Sufi order
- Syed Mohammad Ziaul Haque, Bangladesh Army officer and a fugitive
- Ziaul Haque (died 1998), scholar of economic history and Islamic studies
- Ziaul Islam (1952–2014), Bangladeshi ICC Trophy cricketer
- Ziaul Haque Mollah, Bangladesh Nationalist Party politician and former MP
- Md. Ziaul Haque Mridha, Jatiya Party politician and the former MP
- Ziaul Mustafa Razvi Qadri, Islamic scholar
- Ziaul Roshan (born 1989), Bangladeshi film actor and model,
- Ziaul Hasan Siddiqui, the chairman of Sonali Bank Limited
- Ziaul Haque Zia (1953–2016), Bangladesh Nationalist Party politician
