= Azizul Haque =

Azizul Haque, (Arabic: عزيز الحق) meaning "strong in the truth", is a masculine given name of Arabic origin. Notable people with the name include:

== Given name ==
- Aziz ul Haq (Pakistani activist) (1939–1972), Pakistani activist
- Azizul Haq (scholar, born 1903) (1903–1961), Bangladeshi Islamic scholar
- Azizul Haque (Bogra politician), Bangladesh Nationalist Party Member of Parliament
- Azizul Haque (educator), (1892–1947), Bengali lawyer, writer, and public servant
- Azizul Haque (Naxalite activist) (1942–2025), Indian revolutionary, political leader, and writer
- Azizul Haque (scholar, born 1919) (1919–2012), Bangladeshi imam and scholar
- Azizul Huq Arzu (born 1958), Bangladesh Awami League Member of Parliament
- Azizul Haque Choudhury, Bangladesh Awami League Member of Parliament
- Azizul Haq Mollah (died 1993), Bangladeshi politician

== Surname ==
- Hasan Azizul Huq (1939–2021), Bangladeshi short-story writer and novelist
- Qazi Azizul Haque (1872–1935), also Khan Bahadur Qazi Azizul Huq, police officer and fingerprint pioneer in British India
- M. Azizul Haq (1941/1942–2025), 13th Inspector General of Bangladesh Police
- Syed Azizul Huq (1912–1992), Bangladeshi politician and minister
