= Muddathir =

- Gender: Male
- Language: Arabic

Origin
- Meaning: the Cloaked One

Muddathir (Arabic: مدّثّر; transliterations vary) is an Arabic given name from Al-Muddaththir, a name of Muhammad mentioned in the Qur'an. It may refer to:

- Muddathir Abdel-Rahim (born 1932), Sudanese academic and activist
- Mudather El Tahir (born 1988), Sudanese footballer
- Mudathir Yahya (born 1996), Tanzanian footballer

== See also ==
- Muzzammil (name)
- Mudassar
- Mubashir
- Al-Muddaththir, a surah of the Quran
