= Imdadul Haq =

Imdadul Haq (Bengali: ইমদাদুল হক), a Bengali masculine given name of Arabic origin, may refer to:

- Qazi Imdadul Haq (1882–1926), author
- Saleh Muhammad Imdadul Hoque (1949–1971), army officer
- Imdadul Haq Milan (born 1955), novelist and journalist
- Md. Emdadul Huq (born 1956), High Court justice
- Md. Emdadul Haque Azad (born 1956), High Court justice
- S. M. Emdadul Hoque (born 1963), Supreme Court justice
- Emdadul Haque Chowdhury (born 1966), vice-chancellor of Bangladesh Agricultural University
- Mamun Imdadul Haque Chawdhury, politician from Dhubri, Assam
- Emdadul Haque Milon (born 1993), archer
- Md. Imdadul Hoque (died 2023), vice-chancellor of Jagannath University
- Shah Md. Imdadul Haque, chairman of Bangladesh Chemical Industries Corporation
- Emdadul Haque, politician from Thakurgaon
- Imdadul Haque, politician from Kishoreganj
- Md. Emdadul Haque, politician from Mymensingh
- Emdadul Haque Bhuiyan, politician from Narayanganj

== See also ==
- Imdad
- Haqq (surname)
