= Maijchar Union =

Union parishad (council) in Bangladesh

Coordinates: 24.221°N 91.037°E

Maijchar is a union parishad of Bajitpur Upazila under Kishoreganj District in Dhaka Division, Bangladesh.

== Demographics ==
According to the 2011 Bangladesh census, Maijchar Union had 3,282 households and a population of 16,619. The literacy rate (age 7 and over) was 22.5% (male: 24.7%, female: 20.4%).

== Administration ==
Maijchar Union consists of 10 villages covering a total area of 22 km2:

- Aynargoup
- Baherbali
- Boyali
- Maijchar
- Parkochua
- Purakanda
- Shampur
- Shibpur
