= Mubashir Husain Rehmani =

Pakistani computer scientist

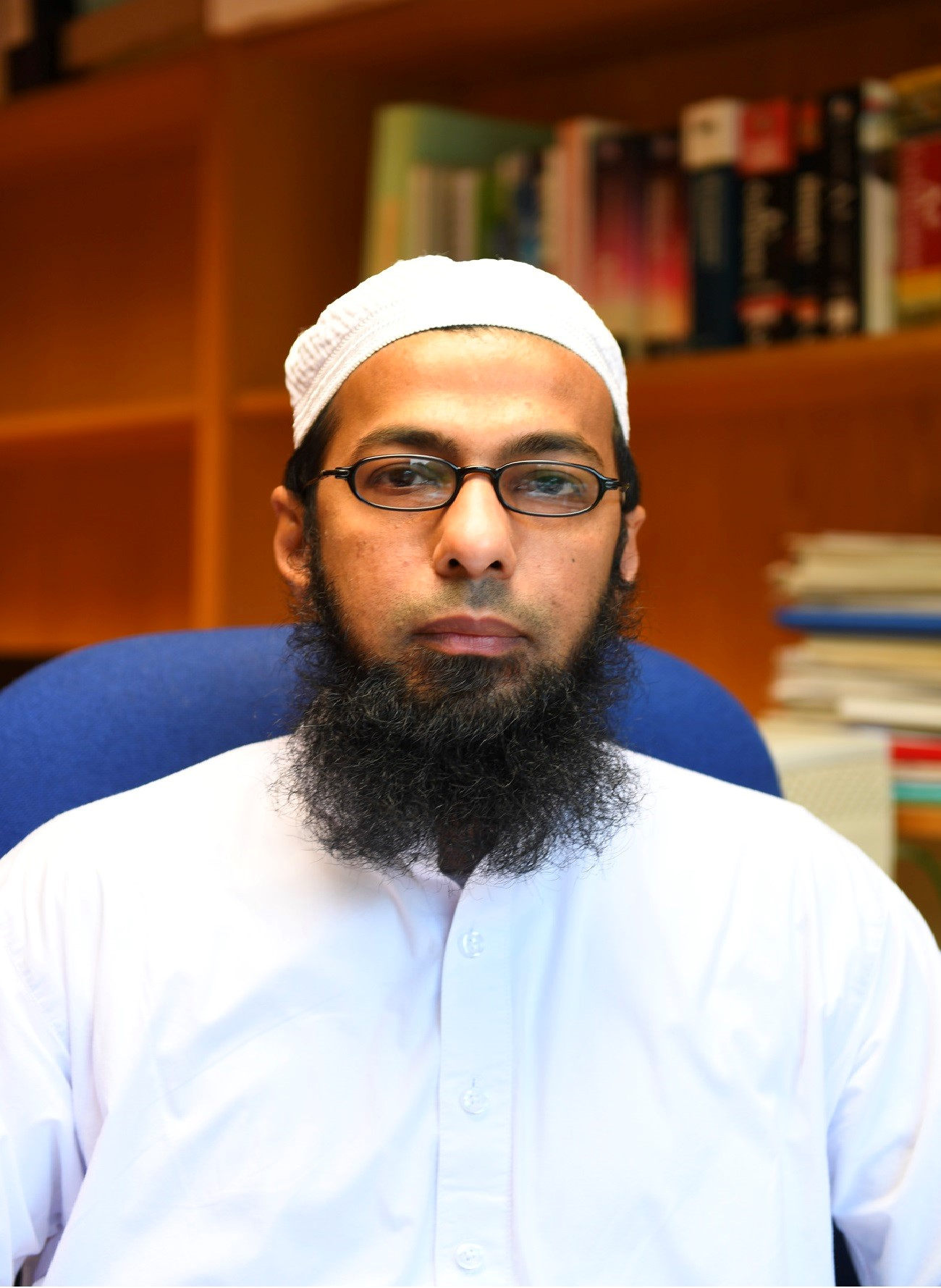
- Rehmani in 2021
- Born: February 23, 1983; Karachi, Pakistan
- Education: B.Engg., MS, Ph.D.
- Alma mater: Mehran University of Engineering and Technology; Sorbonne University; Waterford Institute of Technology
- Known for: Cognitive radio networks, blockchain, wireless networks
- Children: Three
- Father: Muhammad Mazhar Hussain Rehmani
- Awards: Highly Cited Researcher (HCR) 2021, Highly Cited Researcher (HCR) 2020, HEC Best Paper Award, JNCA Best Paper Award, IEEE CSIM Best Paper Award, IEEE COMST Exemplary Editor Award
- Scientific career
- Fields: Computer networking, telecommunication, wireless communication, blockchain.
- Workplaces: Munster Technological University Cork Institute of Technology; COMSATS University Islamabad; Waterford Institute of Technology (2017–2018)
- Thesis: (2011)
- Doctoral advisor: Aline Carneiro Viana and Serge Fdida
- Website: sites.google.com/site/mubrehmani

Mubashir Husain Rehmani (Urdu: مبشر حسین رحمانی) (born on 23 February 1983 in Karachi, Pakistan) is a Pakistani researcher and computer scientist. His areas of work are computer networking, telecommunications, wireless communications and blockchain. He was recognised in 2020 and 2021 as one of the Highly Cited Researchers in computer science by Clarivate.

== Education and career ==
He received his B.Engg. degree in Computer Systems Engineering from Mehran University of Engineering and Technology. M.S. degree in Networks and Telecommunications from University of Paris XI, Paris, France. PhD in Computer Science, from Sorbonne University, France. He worked as a Post Doctoral Researcher in Waterford Institute of Technology.

Dr Rehmani is currently teaching in Department of Computer Science at the Munster Technological University (MTU). He is a senior member of IEEE, an Editorial Board Member of Nature Scientific Reports. Prior to that he is editor of various journals. He was associated with COMSATS University Islamabad, Wah Cantt for 5 years as an Associate Professor. Mubashir serves as an Area Editor (Wireless Communications) in IEEE Communications Surveys and Tutorial (top ranked # 1 journal in Telecommunications by Clarivate).

== Awards ==
- In 2021, Dr. Rehmani won the Exemplary Editor Award 2021 of IEEE Communications Surveys and Tutorials given by IEEE Communication society.
- In 2021, Rehmani won the Clarivate Highly Cited Researcher award, recognising him as top 1% in the world in Crossfield.
- In 2020, Rehmani won the Clarivate Highly Cited Researcher award, recognising him as top 1% in the world in Computer Science.
- The Editor-in-Chief of Elsevier Journal of Network and Computer Applications awarded him Best Survey Paper award in 2018 and a cash prize.
- In 2018 and 2017, Rehmani won Publons Peer Review Award, placing him in Top 1% of reviewers in Computer Science.
- In 2017, Rehmani received Outstanding Associate Editor by IEEE Access.
- In 2015/2016 - Best Research Paper award was giving to him along with Ayaz Ahmad, Sadiq Ahmad, and Naveed Ul Hassan by Higher Education Commission (HEC), Government of Pakistan.
- In 2017, Best Paper Award was given to him by Communications Systems Integration and Modeling Technical Committee by IEEE.
- In 2016 & 2017, Research Productivity Award was given to him by Pakistan Council for Science and Technology (PCST), Ministry of Science and Technology, Pakistan.
- In 2015, Rehmani won the Exemplary Editor Award of IEEE Communications Surveys and Tutorials.

== Editorial activities ==
=== Area editor ===
IEEE Communications Surveys and Tutorial – 2018 to present

=== Editorial board member ===
NATURE Scientific Reports

=== Associate editor ===
IEEE Communications Surveys and Tutorial – 2015 to 2018

IEEE Transactions on Green Communications and Networking - 2021–Present

Elsevier Journal of Network and Computer Applications – 2015 to Present

Springer Wireless Networks Journal – 2015–present

Elsevier Future Generation Computer Systems – 2017 to present

=== Associate technical editor ===
IEEE Communications Magazine – 2014 to 2020

== Teachers ==
Rehmani's teachers included Mufti Muhammad Naeem Memon sahib of Hyderabad (who is the caliph of Mufti Taqi Usmani and Maulana Muhammad Yusuf Ludhianvi shaheed.

== Bibliography ==
Mubashir Rehmani is the author of one textbook and several edited books:

=== Textbook ===
- Rehmani, Mubashir Husain (2021). Blockchain Systems and Communication Networks: From Concepts to Implementation. Textbooks in Telecommunication Engineering. Springer Nature. doi:10.1007/978-3-030-71788-9. ISBN 978-3-030-71787-2. S2CID 241755400.

=== Edited books ===
- Mouftah, Hussein T.; Erol-Kantarci, Melike; Rehmani, Mubashir Husain (2018). Transportation and Power Grid in Smart Cities: Communication Networks and Services. John Wiley & Sons. ISBN 978-1119360087. OCLC 1041560578.
- Rehmani, Mubashir Husain; Dhaou, Riadh, eds. (2019). Cognitive Radio, Mobile Communications and Wireless Networks. EAI/Springer Innovations in Communication and Computing. doi:10.1007/978-3-319-91002-4. ISBN 978-3-319-91001-7. S2CID 196185761.
- Rehan, Muhammad Maaz; Rehmani, Mubashir Husain (2020). Blockchain‑enabled Fog and Edge Computing. CRC Press. ISBN 978-0367457358.
- Next Generation Wireless Terahertz Communication. 2021.
- Cognitive Radio Sensor Networks: Applications, Architectures, and Challenges. IGI Global. 2014. ISBN 978-1466662124.
- Amin, Muhammad; Rehmani, Mubashir Husain (2015). Operation, Construction, and Functionality of Direct Current Machines. IGI Global. ISBN 978-1466684416.
- Emerging Communication Technologies Based on Wireless Sensor Networks: Current Research and Future Applications. Taylor & Francis. 2016. ISBN 978-1498724852. OL 33595808M.

== Islamic work ==
Rehmani wrote several articles on Islamic related matters:

- One of his articles, "Scientific Research, Modern Education, and Madaris" "سائنسی تحقیق، عصری علوم اور دینی مدارس" was published in Bayyinat in Nov and Dec 2021- Jamia Uloom-ul-Islamia
- Another article "عصرِ حاضر کی سائنسی تحقیق اور متعلقہ اسلامی احکام" was published in Darul Uloom Deoband
