= Creation of the Assamese language =

Imposition of Bengali language in Assam

The Dark Age of the Assamese language is a 37 year long time-frame, from 1836 to 1873, during which Bengali is considered by the Assamese-speaking people to have eclipsed the Assamese language. During British India, the Bengali language was introduced in Bengal by replacing Persian as the official language, as the British took over Assam. The clerical and technical workers that they brought to the annexed Assam were Bengali. In order to cater to the needs of the Bengali staff, Bengali was introduced as the medium of instruction in schools and colleges, and for all official purposes.

Nathan Brown, an American Baptist missionary to India, aimed at restoring the Assamese language to avoid it being completely overtaken by the Bengali language. In order to restore the Assamese Language, he took the matter to the British India administration of the time. Eliza Brown, Nathan's wife, was his partner in this mission.

== History ==
With the British annexation of Assam into the Bengal Presidency in 1826 as a result of the Treaty of Yandabo, the prominent Ahom kingdom lost its independence and came under a new regime of foreign domination known as the British Raj. Thus Assam came under the Bengal Administration until 1873. On February 6, 1874, it was made a Chief Commissioner's province, also known as the 'North-East Frontier'. The new Commissioner-ship comprised the five districts of Assam, Khasi-Jaintia Hills, Garo Hills, Naga Hills, and a major portion of the Bengali speaking areas of Goalpara and Sylhet-Cachar; but leaving out Cooch Behar, a prominent part of Assam. The viceroy Curzon’s Plan of Partition of Bengal (1905), facilitated immigration from across the Bengal border to Assam. In April 1836, Persian was replaced by Bengali, as the Court language of Assam on the ground that it was very difficult and costly to replace Persian scribes who were on leave or who left the service. The services of the Bengalis then became essential in the Anglo-vernacular and vernacular schools, since school teachers were not available in adequate numbers to impart lessons in the Bengali language. In 1837 the Act of XXIX,1837 was passed by the President of the Council of India, which gave the governor-general the power to dispense with any regulations of the Bengal Code requiring the use of Persian for judicial and revenue proceedings and to prescribe any other language and script as a replacement.

After seeing Bronson's document, it could be declared that the Main Culprits, in introducing Bengali, were the British officers who did not have the initiative to learn the Assamese language and maintained that the Assamese language was the local form of the Bengali language.

— Maheswar Neog, "Bronsonar peratot ki Ase", Prantik (20th issue,1983)

== Reaction to the imposition ==
There is little evidence to suggest that the local people in the annexed territories resisted or objected to the introduction of Bengali as the language of the court and educational institutions. As a result of this, many claim that the progress of education in Assam remained slow and deficient. Many Bengalis were brought in and employed in the schools of Assam. There was no encouragement for the writing of school text books in Assamese, and Assamese literature suffered. This was thought to be one of the core factors behind the community conflicts that emerged between the Assamese and Bengali communities in the following decades.

Initially the introduction did not meet with any kind of protest. Rather, the Assamese elite used the language in their writings, and even in conversation, and the language policy of the government went unquestioned for almost a decade. In fact, Anandaram Dhekial Phukan, who later advocated against the Bengali language, published his works in Bengali after receiving education in Calcutta. The recruitment of Bengalis to government services increased, leading to greater unemployment among the Assamese. The increased number of Bengali 'Amlas' in the districts of Assam was thought to be posing a challenge to the distinct identities of the People of Assam, because these immigrants had their own culture, language, and traditions, and their existence in the land was perceived as having an effect on Assam's language, culture, economy, and political status.

Early protests came from the American Baptist Missionaries and the educated Assamese elite section, against the language policy of the government. After realizing the need of vernacular medium to spread Christianity, the missionaries espoused the cause of the Assamese as the rightful medium of instruction in the state. In 1839, William Robinson, an inspector of schools, wrote "Grammar of the Assamese Language". Apart from printing religious materials in Assamese, the missionaries made pleas in defense of the Assamese language through the publication of Orunodoi in 1846. Primarily intended for the propagation of Christianity, the Orunodoi, which was published for two decades, contained informative knowledge of science, history, geography and certain regional and national news and views. It is considered to have inspired the younger generation of the Assamese society, to stand up for the cause of the Assamese language. The efforts of the missionaries in establishing a separate identity of the Assamese language, were notable and they received support from the Assamese intelligentsia, followed by a number of petitions and memoranda to the government. The continuous attempts of the Baptist Missionaries and men like Hemchandra Barua, Gunabhiram Barua and Anandaram Dhekial Phukan helped restore Assamese as a language of instruction in the state. Many argue that Ambikagiri Roychoudhury's politics was driven by his personal angst after break-up with his Bengali girlfriend, rather than any real fear of sidelining by the Bengali community.

== Negotiations ==
In February 1874, the government revised its earlier language policy and the Commissioner stated that in the primary schools, Assamese rather than Bengali should be the sole medium of instruction. This decision made the Assamese suspect that it was a ploy by the Bengalis to supplant Assamese. Despite the Chief Commissioner's assurance that Assamese would not be supplanted, Bengali continued to be the medium in the middle grades until the late 19th century.

Vigorous protests were made by the Assamese people against the implementation of Bengali as a medium in the middle and high schools of Assam. On March 28, 1903, the Chief Commissioner stated that students in the Assamese-speaking district of Kamrup were to be taught in Assamese. But the non-availability of Assamese texts stood in the way of implementation. A member of the Assamese elite, Manik Chandra Baruah, made a statement to the Deputy Commissioner of Kamrup that, as the district was never a part of Bengal, and Gauhati was essentially an Assamese town, the medium of instruction in the high schools there must be Assamese. The establishment of Cotton University and Earle Law College can be attributed to the efforts of Manik Chandra Baruah. While accepting the cogency of Baruah's argument, P.G. Melitus, the Commissioner of the Assam valley, pointed out that, at the request of the parents of the Bengali students, arrangements should be made in Gauhati to provide instruction through Bengali. Although Mellitus was willing to agree to the demands of the Bengali community, the Commissioner felt that, owing to their closer ties with the community and the people of Bengal than to the Assamese, schools in Goalpara must teach through the medium of Bengali. In his concluding note, however, Mellitus stated that the imparting of education in Assamese instead of in Bengali was being done at the cost of efficiency. These factors were thought to be the foundations of the Official Language Movement of 1960 and the subsequent Medium of Instruction Movement of 1972. Muzammil Haque was the first martyr of the Medium of Instruction Movement or Madhyam Movement of Assam.

== See also ==
- History of Assamese literature
- Colonial Assam
- Assamese Language Movement
- Assamese language
