= Mubashir =

Mubashir is a name of Arabic origin rooted in the Quran. It means “bearer of good tidings/news”.

Notable people with the name include:

== Given name ==
- Mubashir Hassan (1922–2020), Pakistani politician
- Mobashir Rahman (born 1998), Indian professional footballer
- Mubashir Lucman, Pakistani film director
- Mubashir “Din” Mohi-ud-Din, Kashmiri-American musician
- Mubashir Husain Rehmani (born 1983), Pakistani researcher
- Mubashir Saddique (born 1982), Pakistani YouTuber

== Surname ==
- Faisal Mubashir (born 1986), Pakistani cricketer
- Noman Mubashir (born 1974), Norwegian journalist
- Rana Mubashir, Pakistani television news journalist
