= Mukhtiar Ali Unar =

Pakistani academic, researcher, educationist and writer (born 1964)

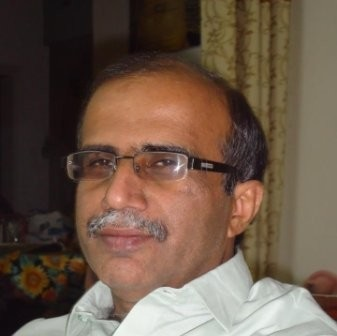
- Unar in 2014
- Born: 1 September 1964 (age 62); Village Din Muhammad Unar, District Matiari, Pakistan
- Education: Mehran University of Engineering and Technology; University of Glasgow
- Awards: Mehran University Alumni Award (2004)
- Scientific career
- Fields: Electronics Engineering, Control Systems, Artificial Intelligence
- Workplaces: Mehran University of Engineering and Technology

Mukhtiar Ali Unar (born 1 September 1964) is a Pakistani academic, researcher, educationist, and writer. He was chief editor of the Mehran University Research Journal of Engineering and Technology from 2008 to 2024. During the 1980s and 1990s, he was also a host and writer at Radio Pakistan Hyderabad.

== Biography ==
Mukhtiar Ali Unar was born on 1 September 1964, in Village Din Muhammad Unar, Taluka, and District Matiari, Sindh, Pakistan. He studied electronic engineering at Mehran University of Engineering and Technology, Jamshoro. He then pursued and obtained his Master's and PhD degrees in engineering from the University of Glasgow, Glasgow, Scotland, UK.

In 1986, he became a lecturer in the Department of Electronic Engineering at Mehran University of Engineering and Technology, Jamshoro. He was named Meritorious Professor in 2010 and retired in 2024. From 2018 to 2024, he was the dean of the Faculty of Electrical, Electronic, and Computer Engineering at the same university. From 2008 to 2024, he also served as the Chief Editor of Mehran University Research Journal of Engineering and Technology. He is the Program Evaluator of the National Computing Education Accreditation Council Islamabad and the Pakistan Engineering Council.

Mukhtiar Ali Unar has produced more than 60 research articles related to artificial intelligence, data science, and control engineering. He has presented his research contributions at numerous conferences held in various countries, including Gibraltar, Malaysia, Spain, Sweden, the United Kingdom, and other countries He was a member of the National Plagiarism Standing Committee of the Higher Education Commission of Pakistan from 2014 to 2018 and Director of the Institute of Information and Communication Technologies of Mehran University. He was also Pro Vice Chancellor of Shaheed Zulfiqar Ali Bhutto Campus, Khairpur Mirs. Currently, he serves as the Director of the Postgraduate Studies at Isra University, Hyderabad.

== Literary contributions ==
Mukhtiar Ali Unar was a host and writer at Radio Pakistan Hyderabad in the 1980s and 1990s. He has written more than 100 literary articles on the history and culture of Sindh. He hosted a Sindhi Science program on Radio Pakistan Hyderabad for more than 5 years. He regularly writes columns for various newspapers of Pakistan.
