= Bhawani Shankar Chowdhry =

Pakistani ICT officer, computer scientist and engineer (born 1959)

Bhawani Shankar Chowdhry Maheshwari
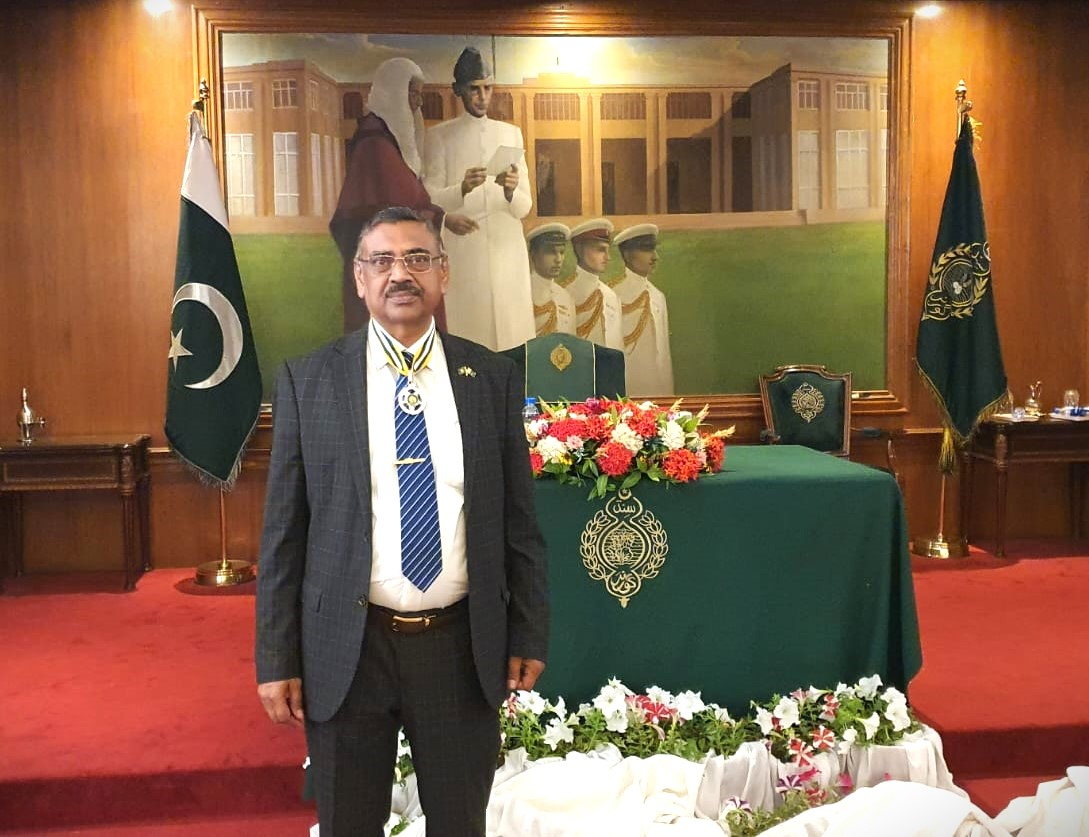
- Bhawani Shankar Chowdhry at Governor House after receiving Sitara-e-Imtiaz on 23 March 2023
- Born: 1 January 1959 (age 67); Kantio, Sindh, Pakistan
- Education: Mehran University of Engineering and Technology; University of Southampton
- Awards: Sitara-i-Imtiaz (2022), Pride of Performance Award, Best Teacher Award, National IT Excellence Award, UNESCO/IAEA Guest Science Award, Presidential Izaz-e-Fazeelat Highest Academic Distinction Award, JCI Senator Award
- Scientific career
- Fields: Electronics engineering, ICT, engineering education
- Workplaces: Mehran University of Engineering and Technology (MUET); University of Southampton
- Website: bschowdhry.info

Bhawani Shankar Chowdhry (born 1 January 1959) is a Pakistani electronics engineer and academic. He is a professor emeritus at the Mehran University of Engineering & Technology (MUET), Jamshoro, Sindh, and served as Dean of the School of Electrical, Electronics, and Computer Engineering from 2011 to 2018.

== Early life and education ==
He was born on 1 January 1959 in Kantio, Sindh, Pakistan. In 1983, he graduated at MUET with a First Class Honours in Bachelor of Engineering. He then joined MUET as a faculty member.

In 1984, Chowdhry received a scholarship from the University of Southampton to study at the Ministry of Science and Technology in the United Kingdom, where he completed his PhD in 1990.

== Career ==
In 1990, Chowdhry returned to MUET as a full-time professor and later served as Chairman of the Department of Electronic Engineering at MUET from 1993 to 2011.

In 2003, Chowdhry established the Department of Biomedical Engineering at MUET and consequently became chairman.

In 2008, Chowdhry completed a one-year postdoctoral fellowship at the University of Southampton's School of Electronics and Computer Science, sponsored by the Higher Education Commission. His research interests included wireless sensor networks. The same year, he was appointed as the director of the Institute of Information and Communication Technologies (IICT), where he continued in that position until 2011.

Chowdhry is a guest associate editor of the International Journal of Wireless Personal Communication, published by Springer Germany.

Chowdhry was the MUET lead representative for the Erasmus Mundus project Mobility of Life at Aalborg University in Aalborg, Denmark. In 2013, he participated in the Erasmus Fellowship under the Strong Ties program at the University of Limerick in Ireland. He is also a member of the Executive Committee of the Hyderabad Information & Software Association (HiSHA).

== Honours and awards ==
In 2002, Chowdhry received the Millennium Gold Medal for academic services at the 12th Star Awards by South Asia Publication.

On 14 August 2022, the President of Pakistan, Arif Alvi, conferred Chowdhry with the Sitara-i-Imtiaz, the nation's third-highest civilian honor, for his services to the country's public and education sector.

== Works ==
- C/C++ for Electronics & Telecommunication Engineers. Published by Mehran Infotech Consultants, Hyderabad, Pakistan, June 2002, 330 pages: ISBN 978-969-8680-01-5.
- The Art of Learning C & MS-Access, Published by Mehran Infotech Consultants, Hyderabad, Pakistan, September 2002, 340 pages.
- Programming with C & Building Database with Access, Published by Mehran Infotech Consultants, Hyderabad, Pakistan, April 2003, 76 pages. ISBN 978-969-8680-07-7.
- Digital Electronics & Microprocessor Technology, Published by Mehran Infotech Consultants, Hyderabad, Pakistan, June 2003, 244 pages.
- Telecommunication Technology, Published by Mehran Infotech Consultants, Hyderabad, Pakistan, June 2003, 198 pages. ISBN 978-969-8680-08-4
- Microprocessors & Interfacing Techniques, Published by Mehran Infotech Consultants, Hyderabad, Pakistan, Jan 2005, 140 pages. ISBN 978-969-8680-13-8.
- A Practical Book of Amplifiers & Oscillators, Published by Mehran Infotech Consultants, Hyderabad, Pakistan, Dec. 2005.
- A Practical Book on Introduction to Computing, by Mehran Infotech Consultants, Hyderabad, Pakistan, January 2006.
- Infotech Insider, by Mehran Infotech Consultants, Pakistan, May 2006, ISBN 978-969-8680-17-6.
- A Practical Book of Electromagnetic Waves and Radiating System, by Mehran Infotech Consultants, Hyderabad, Pakistan, March 2007.
- A Practical Book of Digital Electronics, Published by Mehran InfoTech Consultants, Hyderabad, Pakistan, Jan 2008.
- "Wireless Networks, Information Processing and Systems", CCIS 20, published by Springer Verlag, Germany.
- Career Roadmap Guide for Engineers, published, ISBN 978-969-9526-00-8.
- "Emerging Trends and Applications in Information Communication Technologies", CCIS 281 published by Springer Verlag, Germany (Main Editor). ISBN 978-3-642-28961-3
- "Wireless Sensor Networks for Developing Countries", CCIS 366 published by Springer Verlag, Germany (Main Editor). ISBN 978-3-642-41053-6.
- "The First Book of Electronics Workshop: Can't Beat A Practical Approach! River Publishers, Denmark. ISBN 978-8-793-10247-7.
- "Communication Technologies, Information Security and Sustainable Development", CCIS 414 published by Springer Verlag, Germany (Main Editor).ISBN 978-3319109879, 978-3319109862

== See also ==
- Mehran University of Engineering and Technology
- University of Southampton
