= S. M. Qureshi =

Pakistani academic

S.M. Qureshi
- Born: 3 May 1936; Boobak, Taluka Sehwan, District Jamshoro, Sindh, Pakistan
- Died: 17 February 2019 (aged 83); Karachi, Sindh, Pakistan
- Resting place: Mehran University of Engineering and Technology, Jamshoro
- Education: PhD
- Title: Vice Chancellor, Federal Secretary
- Honours: AIT's HALL of Fame 2010; Life Time Achievement Award by PEC

S.M. Qureshi (3 May 1936 – 17 February 2019) was a Pakistani academic, civil servant, and civil engineer.

He was the founding Vice-Chancellor of Mehran University of Engineering and Technology in Jamshoro, Sindh, Pakistan. His name was included in Hall of Fame of the Asian Institute of Technology, Thailand. He served as Federal Secretary of Education, Federal Secretary of Science and Technology and Convener of the Vice Chancellor's Selection Committee of Government of Sindh.

== Education ==
Qureshi was born on 3 May 1936 to Muhammad Bakhsh Qureshi at Boobak town of Taluka Sehwan, District Jamshoro, Sindh, Pakistan. His real name was Shamsuddin. He graduated from N.E.D. University of Engineering and Technology, Karachi in 1959. He received Master of Engineering (M.E.) degree in Structural Engineering from the Asian Institute of Technology (AIT), Thailand in 1965 and PhD degree in Civil and Structural Engineering from Sheffield University, England in 1971.

== Career ==
Qureshi started his career as a supervisor in the Public Works Department and was promoted as a Design Engineer in the same Department. He was appointed a reader in Sindh University Engineering College, Jamshoro in 1965. He was appointed a Professor of Civil Engineering in the same college in 1971. From March 1974 to July 1976, he served as a member of Pakistan Science Foundation. In July 1976, he was appointed Pro-Vice-Chancellor of the Sindh University Engineering College. This college was upgraded as a University on 1 March 1977 and was renamed as Mehran University of Engineering and Technology.

Qureshi served as Federal Secretary of Education from 1987 to 1990 and Federal Secretary of Youth Affairs from 1990 to 1993. He also served as Secretary of Housing and Works, Zakat and Usher, and Secretary of Science and Technology. He was advisor to International Islamic University from 1996 to 1999 and Chairman of Pakistan Council of Science and Technology from 1999 to 2000. He was Chairman of the Charter Inspection and Evaluation Committee of Governor of Sindh from 2002 to 2013. He founded Mehran University Institute of Science and Technology Development and served as its Director till his death.

== Awards ==
His name was inducted in AIT's Hall of Fame in 2010. Other awards include the following:

- Gold Medal by Governor of Sindh (2010).
- Distinguished Alumni Award by AIT, Thailand (2001)
- Life Time Achievement Award by Pakistan Engineering Council (2001)

== Death ==
Qureshi died on 17 February 2019 in Karachi. He was buried at Mehran University of Engineering and Technology.
