= Mehran University of Engineering & Technology =

Engineering university in Jamshoro, Pakistan

- مھراڻ انجنیری ۽ ٽيڪنالاجي جي دانشگاه جامعہَ انجنیری و فناوری مهران
- Other name: MUET
- Former name: Sindh University Engineering College
- Motto in English: Nurturing the Engineering Graduates with enhanced Perception and Wide Perspective
- Type: Public Sector University
- Established: 1973
- Accreditation: HEC, PEC, PCATP
- Budget: 2,269.505 million PKR
- Chancellor: Governor of Sindh
- Vice-Chancellor: Tauha Hussain Ali
- Students: 7,500+
- Undergraduates: 6,500+
- Postgraduates: 1,000+
- Doctoral students: 70+
- Location: Jamshoro, Sindh, 76062, Pakistan; 25.4081°N 68.2603°E
- Campus: Suburban
- Language: English
- Colours: Baby blue, steel blue, white
- Mascot: Mehranian
- Website: muet.edu.pk

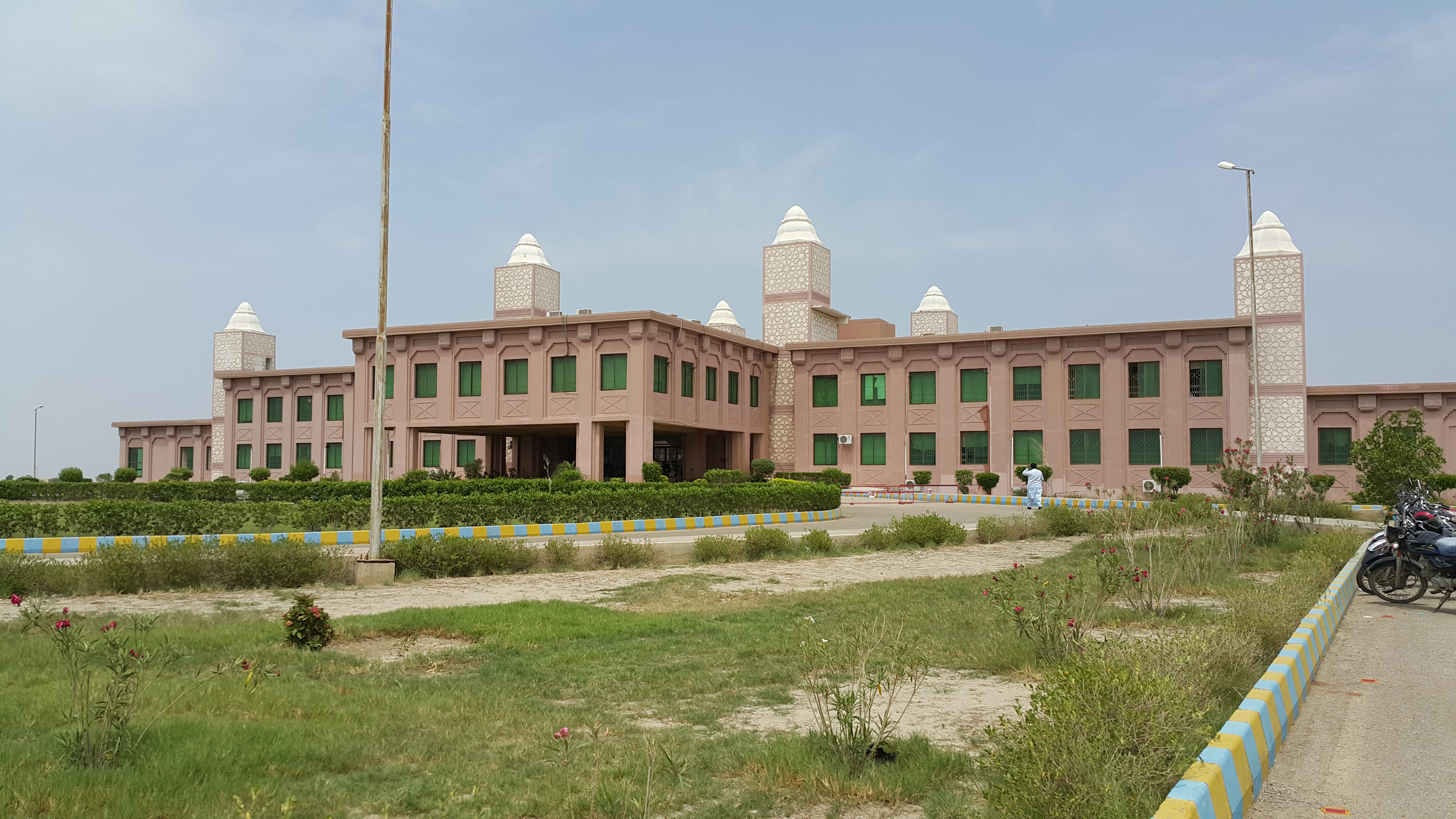
MUET Admin Building

Mehran University of Engineering & Technology (Sindhi: sd:مھراڻ انجنیری ۽ ٽيڪنالاجي جي دانشگاه) (Often referred as Mehran University or MUET) is a public research university located in Jamshoro, Sindh, Pakistan focused on STEM education.

It was established in July 1976, as a campus of the University of Sindh, and a year later was chartered as an independent university. The academician S.M. Qureshi was appointed as the founding vice chancellor of the university. It was ranked sixth in engineering category of Higher Education Institutions in the "5th Ranking of Pakistani Higher Education Institutions" in 2016.

== History ==
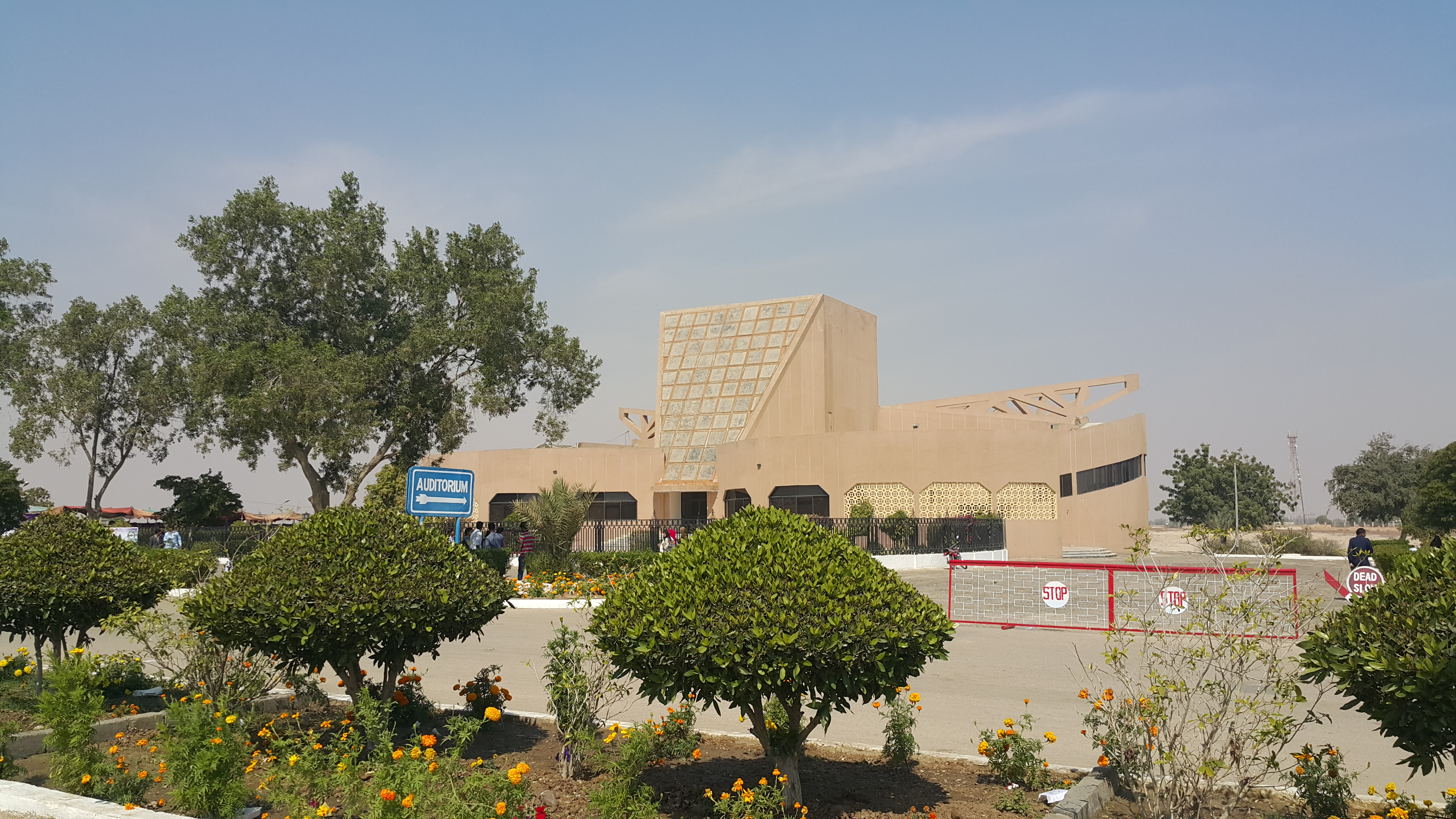
MUET Auditorium

It was established in 1963 in direct response to industrialization as Sind University Engineering College, in Jamshoro about 15 km (9.3 mi) from Hyderabad. It was affiliated with the University of Sindh until 1973, Abdul Qadeer Khan Afghan was one of the founding principal of the college, later with his efforts college was granted the charter of "Engineering University" under the title of "Mehran University of Engineering & Technology" on 1 March 1977 through an ordinance issued by Government of Sindh. The first batch of MUET was inducted in January 1974 with the enrollment of 450 students in civil, mechanical, electrical, electronics, metallurgy, chemical, and industrial engineering. Initially, the classes were started at Government College of Technology, Sakrand Road, Nawabshah, with students residing in college hostels (some classrooms were converted into residential dormitory). Some students acquired private houses in the Society area in Nawabshah, where they lived for two years until newly constructed hostel blocks were made available adjacent to the college campus.

With the induction of the third batch in 1976, the students of the first batch were shifted to Jamshoro to complete their third year and final year of engineering education. This was predominately due to the availability of well-equipped laboratories and highly qualified faculty at MUET Jamshoro campus, and also due to the shortage of space for classrooms and labs at Nawabshah since the number of students had risen to 1500 when the third batch was admitted. The same practice continued for other junior batches who passed their second year of engineering at MUET, Nawabshah, were transferred to MUET Campus at Jamshoro to resume the fifth semester (third year). Later in 1996, the constituent college of Nawabshah also became an independent university.

To further promote Engineering education to interior Sindh, the Government of Sindh established a constituent college of MUET named as "Mehran University College of Engineering & Technology, Khairpur Mir's". Which was later upgraded as a campus of MUET, renamed as "Mehran University of Engineering & Technology, Shaheed Zulfiqar Ali Bhutto Khairpur Mir's Campus". The total number of students enrolled to the First Year classes of all disciplines at Jamshoro campus under the regular scheme was 1053, with 1000 candidates from Sindh Province. It had 548 and 86 individuals admitted under the Self Finance Scheme and Special Scheme, respectively. At Khairpur Mir's Campus, however, there are 244 students admitted to the First Year classes of all four disciplines, with 60 candidates admitted under the Self Finance Scheme.

Inaugurated in 1978, postgraduate courses were started at MUET, leading to a master's degree. It was initiated with three branches, at present it has been extended to other departments.

== Academic profile ==
The university offers undergraduate, post-graduate, and doctoral studies in engineering, business and industrial management, humanities, philosophy, fine arts and science.

=== Undergraduate studies ===
The undergraduate courses are offered by university in seventeen disciplines, leading to a bachelor's degree. Where, fifteen degrees are designated to the field of Engineering, titled as Bachelor of Engineering.(name of the field); Example: B.E.(Mechatronics Engineering).

The rest two degrees are non-engineering degrees in related fields, titled as Bachelor of.(name of the field). These include Bachelor of Architecture (B.Arch.) and Bachelor of City & Regional Planning (B.CRP).

==== Faculty of Mechanical, Process & Earth Engineering ====
Formerly known as Faculty of Engineering. Dean: Prof Khanji Harijan is the current dean of this faculty

- Mechatronics Engineering
- Chemical Engineering
- Industrial Engineering & Management
- Mechanical Engineering
- Metallurgy & Materials Engineering
- Mining Engineering
- Petroleum Engineering | Petroleum & Natural Gas Engineering
- Textile Engineering

==== Faculty of Electrical, Electronics and Computer System Engineering (FEECE) ====
Dean: Prof Mukhtiar Ali Unar is dean of this faculty.

- Biomedical Engineering
- Computer Systems Engineering
- Electrical Engineering
- Electronic Engineering
- Institute of Information & Communication Technologies
- Software Engineering
- Telecommunication Engineering

==== Faculty of Architecture & Civil Engineering ====
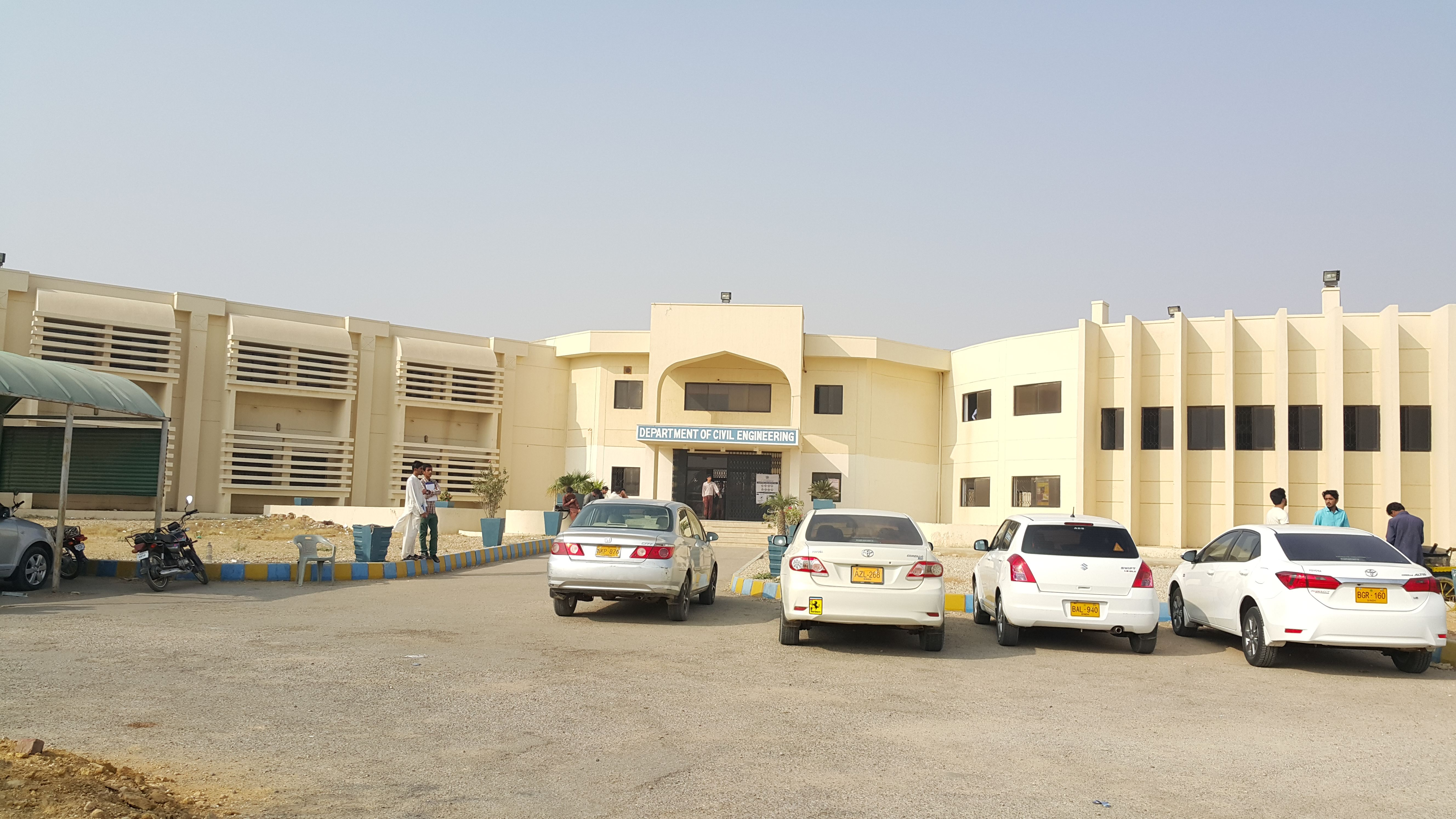
Civil Engineering Department

Dean: Prof. Dr. Rizwan Ali Memon is dean of this faculty

- Architecture
- City & Regional Planning
- Civil Engineering
- Institute of Environmental Engineering & Management
- Institute of Water Resources Engineering & Management

==== Faculty of Basic Sciences ====
Dean: Prof. Dr. Abdul Sattar Larik is dean of this faculty

- Basic Sciences & Related Studies
- English Language Development Center
- Mehran University Institute of Science, Technology & Development

=== Graduate studies ===
The postgraduate courses were started in 1978 leading to the M.E. degree, initially, in three branches. At present, courses are offered in the specialized fields of:

- Mechatronics Engineering
- Biomedical Engineering
- Energy & Environmental Engineering
- Industrial Electronics
- Mining Engineering
- Industrial Engineering and Management
- Communication Systems and Networks
- Electronics System Engineering
- Information Technology
- Computer Science And Information Technology
- Software Engineering
- Structural Engineering
- Public Health Engineering
- Telecommunication and Control Engineering
- Manufacturing Engineering
- Electrical Power Engineering
- Chemical Engineering
- Transportation Engineering
- Irrigation and Drainage Engineering
- Environmental Engineering & Management
- Geotechnical Engineering
- Material science and Engineering
- Energy Systems Engineering
- Data Science

Some courses are offered full-time during the day while others are part-time, conducted during the evenings. Sometimes, a course may be dropped in a given year because of an inadequate number of students. The degrees to be awarded may be post-graduate diploma (P.G.D.), Master of Engineering (M.E.), Master of Philosophy (M.Phil.), or Doctor of Philosophy (Ph.D.), depending upon the quality and quantity of the research/work completed.

=== Institutes ===
The following institutes offer postgraduate studies and research programs.

- Institute of Water Resource Engineering & Management
- Institute of Environmental Engineering and Management
- Institute of Petroleum & Natural Gas Engineering
- Institute of Information & Communication Technologies
- Mehran University Institute of Science & Technology Development
- Directorate of Post-graduate Studies

=== Directorates ===
- Office of Research, Innovation & Commercialization (ORIC)
- Directorate of Centre of English Language & Linguistics (CELL)
- Directorate of Postgraduate Studies
- Directorate of Information & Communication Processing Center (ICPC)
- Directorate of Management Information Systems (MIS)
- Directorate of Planning & Development
- Directorate of Sports
- Directorate of Finance
- Innovation & Entrepreneurship Center
- Coal Research & Resource Center

=== Centers ===
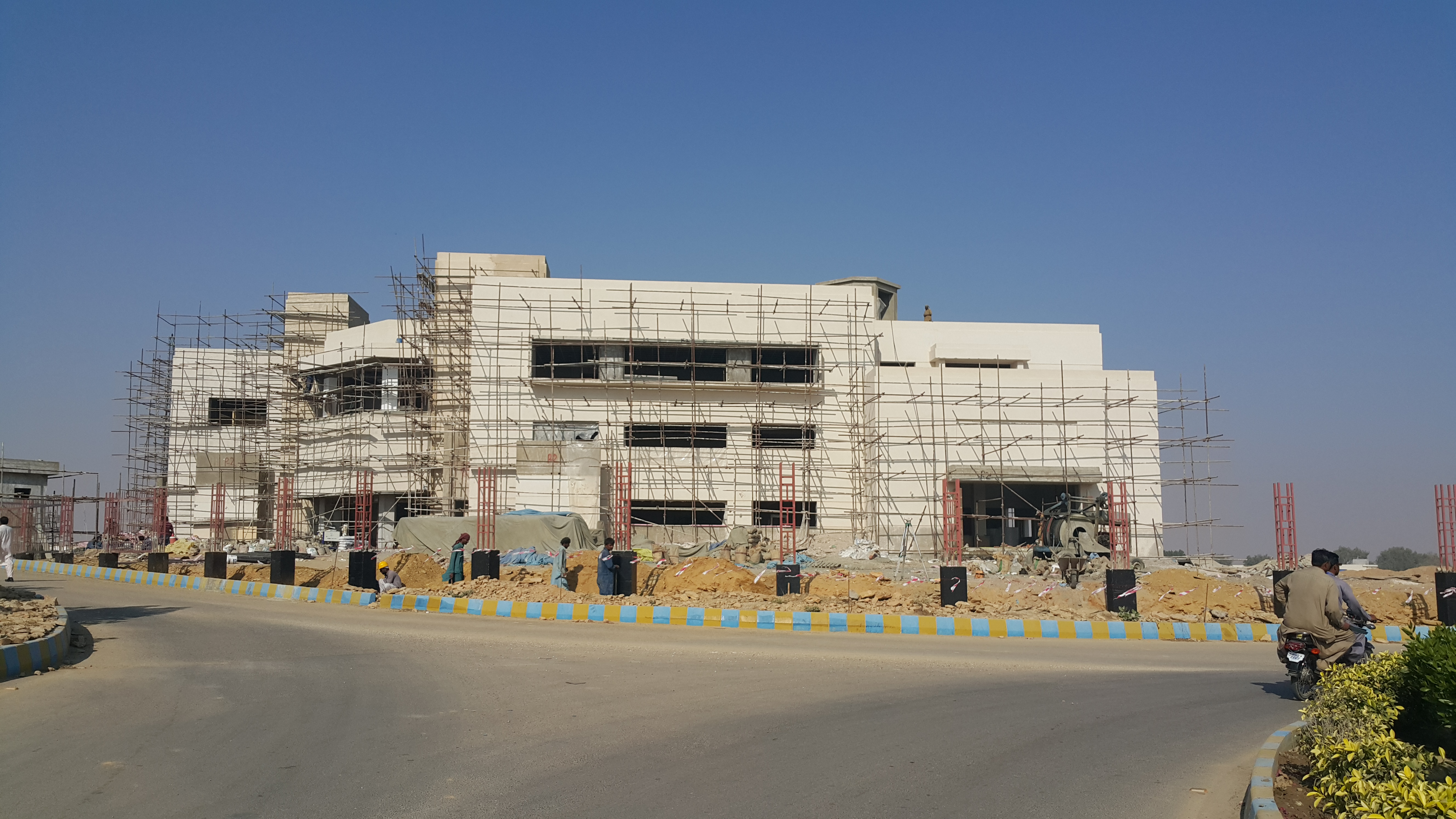
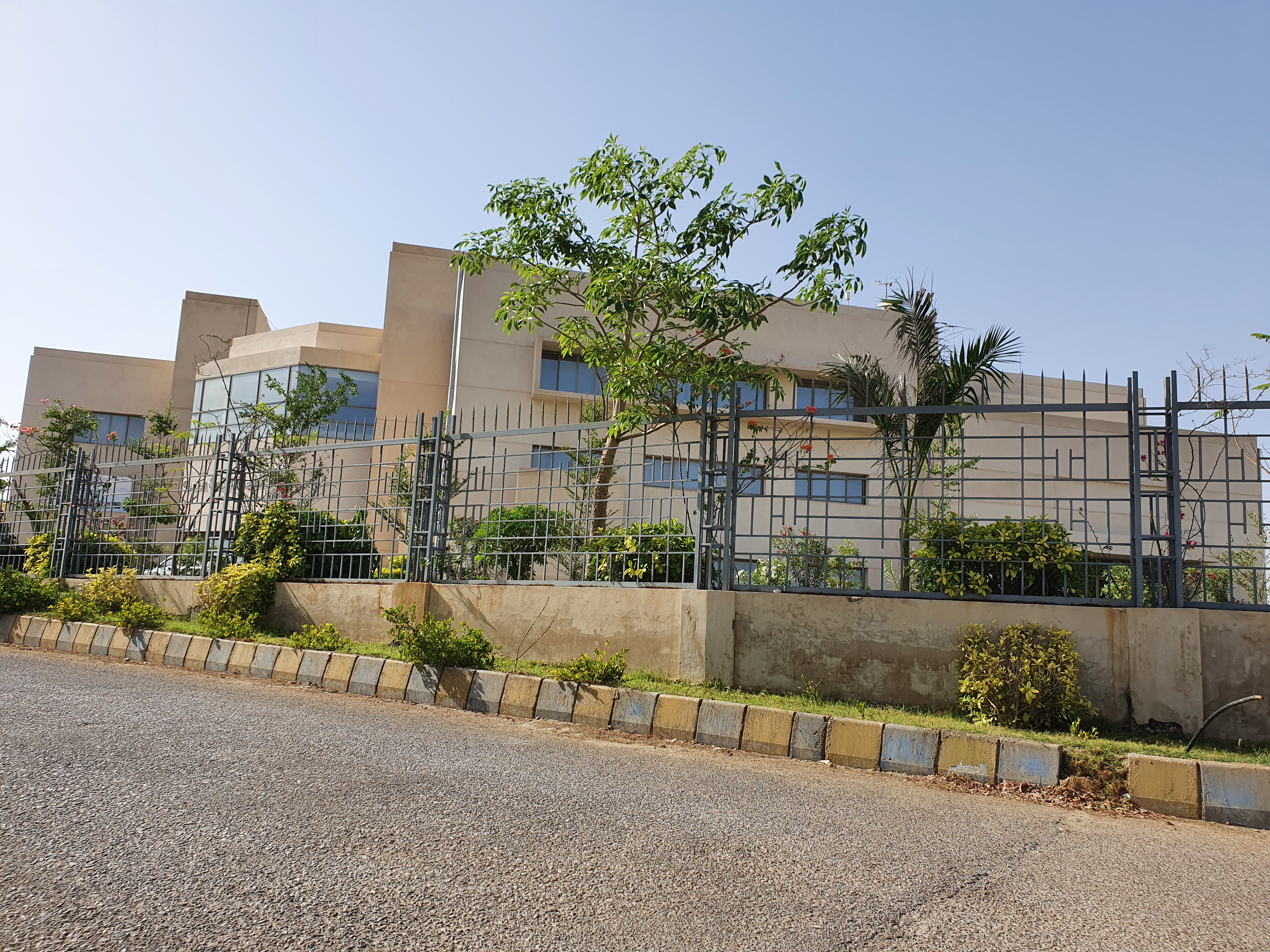
Center for Advanced Studies in Water during and after construction

==== USPCASW – U.S.-Pakistan Center for Advanced Studies in Water ====
The USPCASW – U.S.-Pakistan Center for Advanced Studies in Water, was established at the Mehran University of Engineering and Technology (MUET) Jamshoro, with the financial support of United States Agency for International Development (USAID) Pakistan under the Cooperative Agreement signed with USAID on December 12, 2014, for five years. The University of Utah (UU), USA was providing technical assistance to MUET for advancing the development and growth of USPCAS-W. The tangible deliverables of the Center include postgraduate degree programs, applied policy research, facilitation of public-private partnerships, and provision of policy advice in a range of water-related disciplines. The main purpose of the applied research component is to deliver relevant and innovative research to meet the needs of industry, civil society, and government. Mehran University of Engineering and Technology's cooperative agreement with USAID ended in 2020, now center is supported and managed by the university.

==== Center of Excellence in Nanotechnology and Materials (CENM) ====
Mehran University of Engineering Technology established the Center of Excellence in Nanotechnology and Materials (CENM) in 2017, that performs research, produces international publications, and produces commercial products. Nanomaterials Research Group consists of eminent scientist and faculty members. To date, this center has developed and produce bulk scale nanofiber membranes, Nanofiber Face Mask, nanofiber flytrap, Commercial Graphene and nanofiber water filters.

==== Centre of Excellence in Art & Design (CEAD) ====
This center was initially established as the Federal College of Art and Design (FCAD), and it was handed over to the University of Sindh with the status of an affiliated college. The first batch was admitted to the college in 1999. Later in 2014, the Federal College of Art and Design (FCAD) was converted into the Centre of Excellence in Art & Design (CEAD) by the Ministry of Education, Government of Pakistan Islamabad, and the project was handed over to the Mehran University of Engineering and Technology, Jamshoro as its academic part. In 2020, Centre of Excellence in Arts and Design (CEAD), Mehran University of Engineering and Technology, Jamshoro through Act XIV of Sindh 2020 passed by the Sindh Assembly was converted in to an independent university - Shaheed Allah Buksh Soomro University of Art, Design and Heritages.

==== Innovation & Entrepreneurship Center ====
IEC is established to nurture the innovation and entrepreneurship spirit of students. Programs of IEC are designed to appeal to everyone from students, staff, industry, who are just trying to obtain a primer on entrepreneurship, to serial entrepreneurs.

==== NCRA-HHRCM, MUET ====
Under the umbrella of National Center of Robotics and Automation, the Haptic, Human Robotic and Condition Monitoring lab is established at Mehran University of Engineering and Technology, Jamshoro. This center is working in collaboration with Pakistan Railway's to support and improve the condition monitoring system of Pakistan railways.

=== Research ===
Mehran University has been publishing the quarterly Mehran University Research Journal of Engineering and Technology (MURJ) since January 1982; the journal is being abstracted/indexed in a number of International indexing agencies and databases including Web of Science, EBSCOhost, ProQuest, Inspec, Directory of Open Access Journals, GALE/Cengage databases and others.

=== Societies and clubs ===
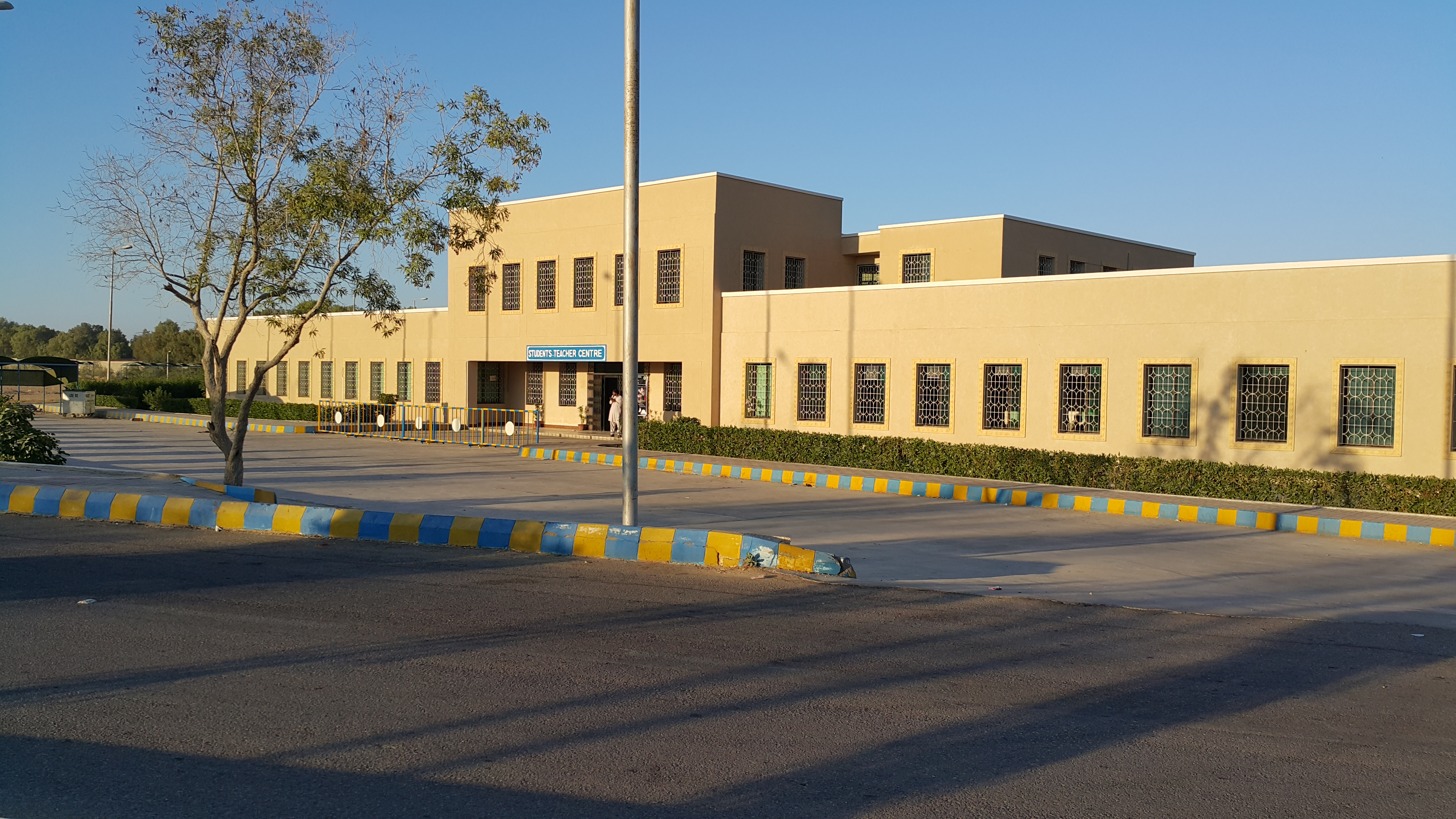
MUET provides Student Teachers Center which has a food mess and other student-related offices and hostel provost offices

- IEEE MUET Student Branch
- IEEE RAS, MUET Chapter
- IEEE EMBS, MUET Chapter
- IEEE WIE, MUET Chapter
- IEEE IES, MUET Chapter
- Association for Computer Machinery (ACM)
- Mechatronics Society of Robotics & Automation (MSRA)
- Society of Artificial Intelligence (SAIL)
- Mehranian Materials Advantage Chapter (MMAC)
- Society for Women Engineers, MUET Chapter (SWE)
- Society of Petroleum Engineers, MUET Chapter (SPE)
- American Institute of Chemical Engineers (AICHE) MUET Chapter
- American Society of Mechanical Engineers (ASME)
- Mehran University of Engineering and Technology Model United Nation (MUETMUN)
- Innovation & Entrepreneurship Society (IES)
- Mehran University Debating and Dramatic Society (MUDDS)
- Mehran University Alumni Association (MUAA)
- Mehran University Civil Engineering Society (MUCES)
- Software Engineering Society (SES-MUET)
- Environmental Engineering Student's Organization(EESO-MUET)
- Mehran Arts And Literature Society (MALS)
- TEDxMUET

=== Rankings ===
- According to latest QS World University Rankings 2020 MUET ranks among top 351-400 universities of the Aisa.
- MUET is ranked among the top ten institutions of higher learning in Pakistan by the Higher Education Commission of Pakistan (HEC). According to latest rankings of HEC, MUET ranks first in Sindh and eighth in Pakistan, in engineering category.
- MUET also ranks as second best public sector university of Pakistan.
- MUET placed 271st worldwide and second in Pakistan out of 780 institutions in the Universitas Indonesia (UI) GreenMetric World University Ranking for 2019
- In 2010's QS World University Rankings, MUET ranked among the top 400 universities of the world. .

== Affiliated campuses and colleges ==
=== MUET SZAB Campus, Khairpur Mir's ===
Mehran University of Engineering and Technology SZAB Campus is the rural campus of the Mehran University of Engineering and Technology located in Khairpur Mir's. This campus was initially established as constituent College of Mehran University of Engineering and Technology, Jamshoro named as Mehran University College of Engineering & Technology at Khairpur Mirs. In 2009, the Government of Sindh vides its Notification No. SO(C-IV) SGA&CD/4-29/09 dated 2 April 2009 constituted a High Power Board of Directors, established a constituent, and upgraded it from college to campus and renamed as Mehran University of Engineering and Technology Shaheed Zulfiqar Ali Bhutto Campus. The campus is offering education in various undergraduate and post-graduate disciplines. Being a campus of Mehran University of Engineering & Technology, the campus has the same teachings system, courses of studies, rules, and procedures for admissions and examination systems as the Mehran University of Engineering and Technology contains. The campus is headed by Pro-VC who will work under the administrative control of Mehran University of Engineering and Technology, Jamshoro.

=== Rana Chandar Singh MUET Campus ===
In 2024, Government of Sindh has announced to open a Rana Chandar Singh MUET campus of Mehran University of Engineering and Technology at Umerkot district.

=== Sujawal Campus ===
In 2022, Government of Sindh has announced to open a campus of Mehran University of Engineering and Technology at Sujawal district.

=== MUET Jacobabad Campus ===
MUET has decided to establish a sub-campus at Jacobabad to cater to the needs of engineering students of northern Sindh. Prof. Dr. Mohammad Aslam Uqaili, Vice-chancellor of MUET performed a groundbreaking ceremony of the sub-campus of MUET at Jacobabad, in February 2018. Regular classes were scheduled to start in 2019 but did not start.

=== Government College of Technology, Hyderabad ===
Government College of Technology, Hyderabad is affiliated with MUET which offers courses in B.Tech.(Pass) and B.Tech.(Hons.) in Civil, Electrical, and Mechanical Technologies. MUET conducts the examinations of this college and awards degrees.

=== The Hyderabad Institute of Arts, Science, and Technology, Hyderabad ===
The Hyderabad Institute of Arts, Science, and Technology, Hyderabad offers courses in BS (Information Technology) and MS (Business Information Technology). The Pre-admission Test of the candidates is conducted by the agency prescribed by Mehran University of Engineering and Technology, Jamshoro. Mehran University conducts the examinations and awards the degrees to students of this institute.

=== Mehran College of Science and Technology, Hyderabad ===
Mehran College of Science and Technology, Hyderabad offers courses in B.Tech.(Pass) and B.Tech.(Hons.) in Civil, Electrical, and Mechanical Technologies. Mehran University conducts the examinations of this college and awards degrees.

== Membership and associations ==
=== Memberships ===
- Association of Commonwealth Universities (ACU) U.K., 1998–99.
- UNESCO International Centre for Engineering Education (UICEE), Australia, 2000.
- Federation of the Universities of the Islamic World (FUIW), Rabat, Morocco, 1999.
- Community of Science (COS) USA, 2001.
- Commonwealth Universities Study Abroad Consortium (CUSAC), U.K., 2000–2001.
- Pakistan National Committee on Irrigation and Drainage (PANCID), 2001.

=== Associations ===
- The Pakistan Atomic Energy Commission
- Azerbaijanian Industrial Institute of Ministry of Education of Azerbaijanian Republic
- IUBAT International University of Business Agricultural and Technology, Bangladesh
- National Institute of Public Administration (NIPA) Karachi
- University of Illinois, Urbana Champaign
- Colorado St. University, at Fort Collins
- University of Central Florida, Orlando
- University of Leeds, UK
- University of Nottingham
- Mountain University, Leoben, Austria
- Kyushu Institute of Technology, Japan
- University of Mauritius, Mauritius
- University of Putra, Malaysia
- University of Natal, South Africa

=== MoUs ===
- Universiti Teknologi Malaysia
- International Islamic University Malaysia
- University of Southampton
- Beijing Technology and Business University
- Technische Universität Darmstadt
- Al-Futtaim Technologies
- Sui Southern Gas Company
- Pakistan Bait-ul-Mal
- SmartMentor
- Saman-e-Shifa Foundation

=== ISO certification ===
MUET is certified as having ISO 9000 compliant business processes since 2003. The university is also a member of Association of Commonwealth Universities of the United Kingdom. On April 28, an independent audit by a team of International Organization for Standardization 9001:2008 found glaring omissions in the MUET examination controller's department. These include lack of clarity of the authorities' matrix as to who is authorized for what; lack of secrecy in department's security where the doors were found open; manual, handwritten ledgers that have yet to be computerized and untrained coordinators for ISO.

== Notable alumni ==
- Rudra Pandey is a Nepali entrepreneur, currently serving as executive chairman of Deerwalk Inc
- Tauha Hussain Ali is the current vice chancellor of Mehran University of Engineering and Technology. In 2018, he was awarded with HEC's best university teacher award. He has also remained governing body member of Pakistan Engineering Council and Higher Education Commission of Pakistan.
- Mubashir Husain Rehmani is global researcher in the field of computer science, recognized by Clarivate Analytics. He is currently serving at Department of Computer Science at the Cork Institute of Technology.
- Bhawani Shankar Chowdhry is professor emeritus, distinguished national professor and former dean FEECE MUET
- Mukhtiar Ali Unar is a meritorious professor and dean of the Faculty of Electrical, Electronic, and Computer Engineering
- Zeeshan Khatri is a nanotechnology expert, innovator and entrepreneur, known for his NanoCLO mask, which appeared as a substitute for N-95 during COVID-19.
- Ayaz Latif Palijo is a politician, lawyer, activist, writer, and teacher. Palijo is the president of Qomi Awami Tahreek and central convener and founder of the Sindh Progressive Anti-Nationalist Alliance.
- Pesu Mal is a Pakistani politician who has been a member of the Provincial Assembly of Sindh, since June 2013
- Shahid Abdul Salam Thahim is a Pakistani politician who has been a member of the Provincial Assembly of Sindh, since May 2013
- Awais Qadir Shah is a Pakistani politician who has been a member of the Provincial Assembly of Sindh, since May 2013.
- Sharjeel Memon is a Pakistani politician who has been a member of the Provincial Assembly of Sindh since June 2008
- Danish Nawaz, sitcom actor

== See also ==
- List of Islamic educational institutions
