= Bajitpur Upazila =

Upazila in Kishoreganj District, Bangladesh

Bajitpur বাজিতপুর
- Upazila
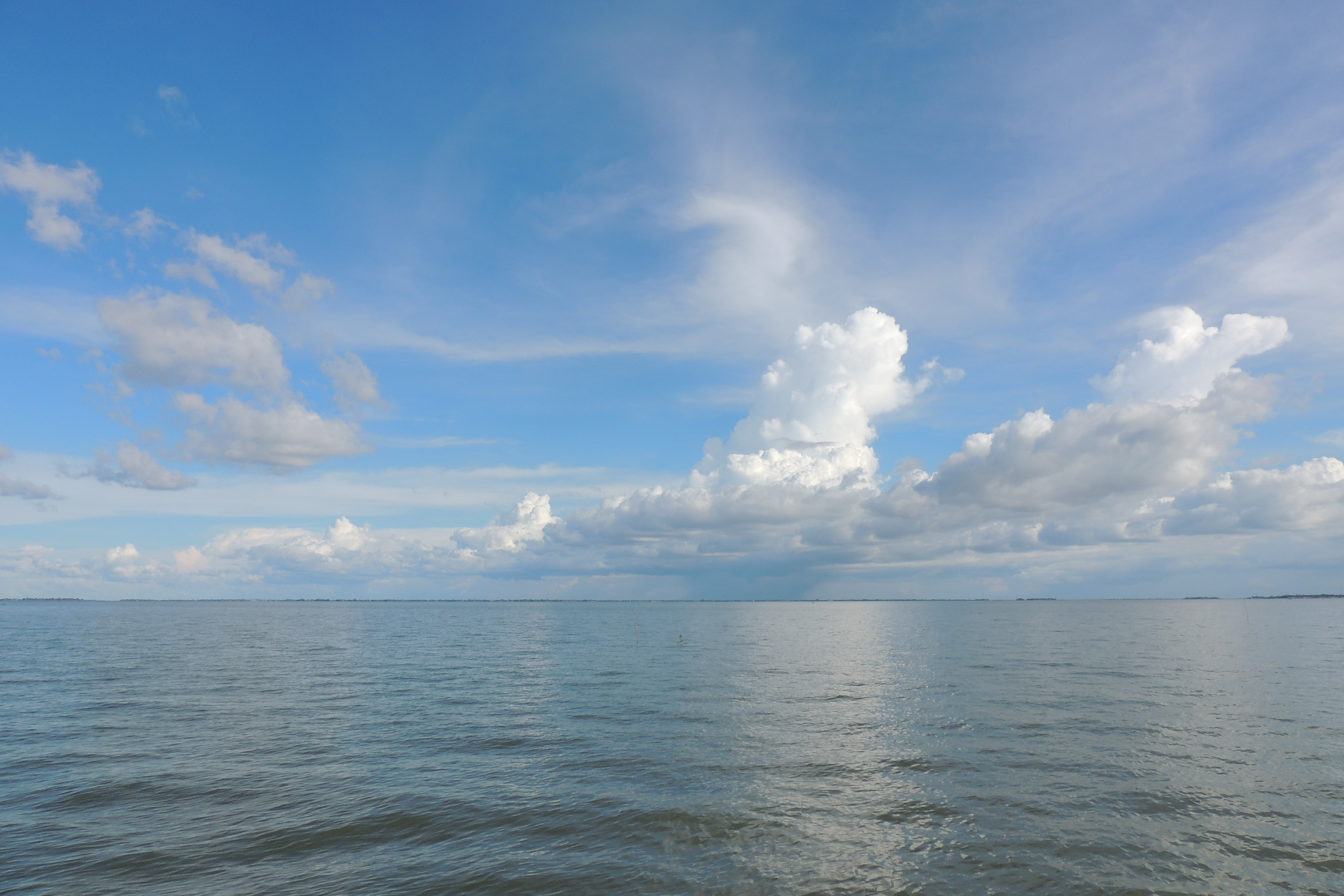
- Bajitpur Haor

- Coordinates: 24°13′N 90°57.5′E
- Country: Bangladesh
- Division: Dhaka
- District: Kishoreganj

Area
  - Total: 193.76 km^{2} (74.81 sq mi)

Population (2022)
  - Total: 269,756
  - Density: 1,392.2/km^{2} (3,605.8/sq mi)
- Time zone: UTC+6 (BST)
- Postal code: 2336
- Area code: 09423
- Website: Official Map of Bajitpur

Bajitpur Upazila mauza geocode map

Bajitpur (Bengali: বাজিতপুর) is an upazila of Kishoreganj District in Bangladesh. Bajitpur upazila is located in Nandina the center place of Bajitpur. Bajitpur was created by Baizid Kha. Formerly Bhairab and Kuliarchar were included in this town. This place is full of canals and rivers. Dilalpur river port here was famous in the subcontinent during the British period.

It was previously a part of greater Mymensingh district. It has a medical college named Jahurul Islam Medical College.

It has an airport named Bajitpur Airport, which is currently unused and closed.

== History ==
During the British period the naval port of Dilalpur of this upazila became famous. Indigo centres were established at Gopinathpur and Ghoraghat. Consignments of pearl of the Bhati region were made from these areas.

Bajitpur was created by Baizid Khan. The Fakir-Sanyasi revolts extensively spread over Bajitpur.

During the war of liberation the Muktibahinis liberated Bajitpur on 26 October after defeating occupant Pak army.

== Geography ==
Bajitpur is located at 24.2167°N 90.9583°E. It has 53,345 households and total area 193.76 km^{2}.

=== Rivers ===
There are many main rivers in Bajitpur.

- Meghna
- Brahmaputra
- Ghorautra
- Dholeshori

== Demographics ==
Religions in Bajitpur Upazila (2022)
Religion	Percent
Islam	92.01%
Hinduism	7.98%
Other or not stated	0.01%

According to the 2022 Bangladeshi census, Bajitpur Upazila had 62,234 households and a population of 269,756. 11.05% of the population were under 5 years of age. Bajitpur had a literacy rate (age 7 and over) of 68.46%: 69.13% for males and 67.83% for females, and a sex ratio of 93.40 males for every 100 females. 47,472 (17.60%) lived in urban areas.

According to the 2011 Census of Bangladesh, Bajitpur Upazila had 53,345 households and a population of 248,730. 71,523 (28.76%) were under 10 years of age. Bajitpur had a literacy rate (age 7 and over) of 41.16%, compared to the national average of 51.8%, and a sex ratio of 1041 females per 1000 males. 34,898 (14.03%) lived in urban areas.

== Economy ==
=== Main occupations ===
Agriculture 42.29% Fishing 2.67% Agricultural Labourer 18.97% Wage Labourer 4.13% Commerce 12.28% Transport 3.12% Service 5.22% Others 11.32%

=== Land use ===
Total cultivable land 15,862 hectares; single crop 31.90%, double crop 56.61%, treble crop 11.48%;

Land under irrigation: 12,800 hectares.

Land control: among the peasants 55% are landless, 31% small, 12% intermediate, 2% rich.

Value of land: the market value of the land of the first grade is about 8500 Taka per 0.01 hectare.

=== Main crops ===
Paddy, jute, wheat, potato, peanut, sweet potato and vegetables.

=== Main fruits ===
Mango, Jackfruit, banana, bel, lemon, natkol, lotkon (bobi)

=== Manufactories ===
Rice Mill 15 Saw Mill 10 Iron Boar Factory 2 Ice Mill 3 Welding 5 Shoe Factory 3

=== Cottage industries ===
Chappa dry fish 100, Wood Works 80, Goldsmith 32, Blacksmith 25, Potteries 9, Tailoring 112, Wooden Boat making 7

=== Hats, bazars and fairs ===
Total number of hats and bazars are 21,

the most noted are

1. Fatehpur
2. Sreedharganj
3. Bajitpur
4. Gazirchar
5. Dilalpur/Burhanpur
6. Bhagolpur
7. Shorarchar
8. Hilachia Bazar
9. Pirijpur
10. Halimpur Bazar
11. Indurdyr Dorga Bazer
12. Shitoli mela Aliabad

Fair

1. Bhagolpur fair
2. Kamiarbali fair
3. Kamalpur fair
4. Gazirchar fair
5. Dilalpur fair
6. Fulbaria fair
7. Boishakhi fair (Bashmohol)
8. Kurer phuller mella (fair). North Shekhdi, Halimpur. Horse race is the main attraction of the fair. The fair is usually held in mid-January.

=== Main exports ===
Rice, Egg, Milk, Banana, Chicken. Fish

== Administration ==
Bajitpur thana was established in 1835 and was turned into a municipal town on 1 April 1869. Bajitpur was turned into an upazila in 1983.

Bajitpur (Town) The town is now a municipality with an area of 9.84 km^{2} and population 26609; male 50.76%, female 49.24%; density of population is 2704 per km^{2}. The literacy rate is 41.4%.

Bajitpur Upazila is divided into Bajitpur Municipality and 11 union parishads: Baliardi, Dighirpar, Dilalpur, Gazirchar, Halimpur, Hilochia, Humaipur, Kailag, Maijchar, Pirijpur, and Sararchar. The union parishads are subdivided into 84 mauzas and 188 villages.

Bajitpur Municipality is subdivided into 9 wards and 28 mahallas.

== Transport ==
Roads: pucca 70 km, mud road 287 Railways: 10 km Waterways: 40 km

Traditional transport Palanquin, bullock cart, horse carriage, buffalo cart, pansi boat, saranga boat. These means of transport are either extinct or nearly extinct.

== Education ==
Literacy rate 75%.

College 4, Private Medical College 1, Nursing Institute 1, High School 13, Junior High School 2, Madrasa 10, Government Primary School 82, Non-Government Primary School 24;

Education Institute Name with Educational Institute Identification No (EIIN)-

- Jahurul Islam Medical College
- Digher Par Junior Secondary School (EIIN – 110255)
- Bajitpur Hafez Abdur Razzak Pilot High School (EIIN – 110245)
- Bajitpur Razzakunnesa Pilot Girls High School (EIIN – 110244)
- Begum Rahima Girls High School (EIIN – 110240)
- Dilalpur Abdul Karim High School (EIIN – 110248)
- Duaigaon Sultanpur High School (EIIN – 110252)
- Halimpur High School (EIIN – 110250)
- Hilachia High School (EIIN – 110247)
- Kamar Ali Khan High School (EIIN – 110249)
- Meraj Mannan Alam High School (EIIN – 110254)
- Mofizur Rahman Rokan High School (EIIN – 110253)
- Nazirul Islam Collegiate School (EIIN – 110246)
- Pirijpur High School (EIIN – 110251)
- Sararcar Sibnath Bahumukhi High School (EIIN – 110242)
- Sararchar Soudamini Surbala Girls High School (EIIN – 110243)
- Abdul Mannan Shopon High School 2013(EIIN -)
- Nilokhi Q.U. Junior Madrasha (EIIN – 110256)
- Pirizpur Islamia Dakhil Madrasa (EIIN – 110258)
- Sararchar Islamia Fazil Madrasha (EIIN – 110257)
- Bajitpur Govt. College (EIIN – 110259)
- Ad. Haji Usman Guni Model College
- Aftab Uddin School And College (EIIN – 110260)
- Sararchar Technical And Business Management College (EIIN – 132978)
- Jahurul Islam Nursing Training Institute (EIIN – 133131)
- Ismail Salma Agriculture Institute.
- Haji Abdul Bari Ninmo Maddhomik Biddhalay. (Burikanda, Sararchar)
- Bajitpur Govt College(1964)

== Notable people ==
There are many famous people of Bajitpur.

- Khan Bahadur Abdul Karim, lawyer and politician
- Jahurul Islam (industrialist)
- Md. Afzal Hossain (politician)
- Sheikh Rahman (US Senator)
- Abdul Monem Khan (Governor of East Pakistan)
