= Dilalpur Union =

Dilalpur Union দিলালপুর ইউনিয়ন
- Interactive map of Dilalpur Union
- Coordinates: 24.190°N 90.968°E
- Country: Bangladesh
- Division: Dhaka
- District: Kishoreganj
- Upazila: Bajitpur Upazila

Government
  - Type: Local government
- Time zone: BST
  - Summer (DST): UTC+6
- Website: dilalpurup.kishoreganj.gov.bd

Dilalpur union is a union of Bajitpur upazila of Kishoreganj district of Dhaka division of Bangladesh. It is a very old union. It is located on the bank of river Ghorautra. During the British period, the river port of Dilalpur was famous in the subcontinent. Many ships used to sail here every day. During the reign of Nawab Alivardi Khan, the famous scholar of the subcontinent, Maulvi Ubedul Hasan, was born here.

== History ==
During the British period the naval port of Dilalpur Union in Bajitpur Upazila became famous.

== Demographics ==
Dilalpur Union consists of 24 villages covering a total area of 10.55 km2.

According to the Bangladesh Bureau of Statistics (BBS) as of January 27, 2001

Total Population is 16,006 Literacy Rate 32.48 % Gross Enrolment Ratio of Primary Education 40.11 Girls Enrolment Ratio of Primary Education 43.45 Unemployment Ratio 26.77 Person Sanitation Coverage 38.49 Safe Drinking Water: 90.35% household Electricity Coverage: 30.38% household Ratio of Information Facility 0.00 per Thousand Ratio of Interactive Information Facility 0.00 per Thousand Ratio of Non-Interactive Information Facility 0.00 per Thousand

== Administration ==
Name of the villages in Dilalpur Union-

1. Saser Dighi
2. Kurerpar
3. Puran hati
4. Maijpar
5. Noapara
6. Shahanagar
7. Alirhati
8. Fulbaria
9. Mollapara
10. Rotonpur
11. Santer Kanda
12. Nagar Dilalpur
13. Bagpara
14. Bhahernagar/porbo para poute bare
15. Boro Khotula
16. Doria Kandi
17. Gupartyar Nagar
18. Jaloapara
19. Kamaria Vita
20. Khalahati
21. Khatera
22. Maha Mirerbag
23. Tatal Char
24. Udhatiar Kandi
25. Mirer Mohalla
26. Pathan Hatis

== Education ==
- College: No
- High School: 1
1. Dilalpur Abdul Karim High School, Dilalpur, Bajitpur, Kishoreganj.
- Junior High School: No
- Madrasha: 2
1. Dilalpur Madrasha
2. Bagpara Madrasha
- Government Primary School: 4
1. 12 No. Bahernagar Gov. Primary School.
- Non-Government Primary School: No

Education Institute Name with Educational Institute Identification No (EIIN)-

• Dilalpur Abdul Karim High School (EIIN – 110248)

== See also ==
- Bajitpur Upazila
- Bangladesh Bureau of Statistics
