= Mahmudul Haque (disambiguation) =

Mahmudul Haque is a Muslim masculine given name of Arabic origin, meaning "trustee of the truth". Notable bearers of the name include:

- Mahmudul Haque (1941–2008), Bangladeshi author
- Mahmudul Hoque (born 1958), Bangladeshi High Court justice
- Mahmudul Haque Liton (born 1963), Bangladeshi footballer and coach
- Syed AB Mahmudul Huq, Bangladeshi High Court justice
- Mahmudul Haque Sayem, Bangladeshi politician
- Mahmudul Haque Rubel, Bangladeshi politician
- Mahmood ul Haq, Pakistani politician

== See also ==
- Mahmud
- Haqq (surname)
