= Pesu Mal =

Pakistani politician

Member of the Provincial Assembly of Sindh
- In office June 2013 – 28 May 2018
- Constituency: Reserved seat for minorities

Personal details
- Born: 3 May 1972 (age 54) Jamshoro
- Party: Pakistan Peoples Party

Pesu Mal is a Pakistani politician who had been a Member of the Provincial Assembly of Sindh, from June 2013 to May 2018.

== Early life and education ==
He was born on 3 May 1972 in Jamshoro.

He has done Bachelor of Engineering from Mehran University of Engineering and Technology.

== Political career ==
He was elected to the Provincial Assembly of Sindh as a candidate of Pakistan Peoples Party on reserved seat for minorities in the 2013 Pakistani general election.
