= Jahurul Islam (entrepreneur) =

Bangladeshi businessman (1928–1995)

- Born: 1 August 1928; Bajitpur, Kishorganj, Dhaka,
- Died: 19 October 1995 (aged 67); Singapore City, Singapore

Jahurul Islam (1 August 1928 – 19 October 1995) was a Bangladeshi entrepreneur. He was the founder-chairman of the Islam Group.

== Early life ==
Islam was born on 1 August 1928 in Bhagalpur village of Bajitpur thana under Kishoreganj District, East Bengal, British Raj. He studied in Shararchar High School and Bajitpur High School. He completed his matriculation exams from the Ripon High School, Calcutta. He could not pursue further education due to financial constraints. He joined the C and B department as a low level government employee in 1948.

== Career ==
Islam started his career as a contractor after leaving government service, using the experience he gained at the C and B department. In 1964 he founded Eastern Housing Limited.

During the Bangladesh famine of 1974, he opened five food kitchens to feed the poor. In 1975 he established Bengal Development Corporation. His company built buildings of the Sangshad Bhaban compound, Bangladesh Bank building, Bangladesh High Court building, Bangladesh Supreme Court building, MP hostel, and major highways in Bangladesh. He established jute and furniture factories. Bengal Development Corporation received contracts for construction in Abu Dhabi, Iraq, and Yemen.

In 1985-1986 Islam founded Navana Pharmaceuticals Limited. In 1989 Islam founded Jahurul Islam Medical College and Hospital.

== Death and legacy ==
Islam died on 19 October 1995 in Singapore. He died from a heart attack. He was buried in Bhagalpur, Kishoreganj District. His son, Manzurul Islam, is the current chairman of Islam Group.
