= Mozammil Haque =

Martyr of Medium Movement (Assam)

Swahid Mozammil Haque was the first martyr of Medium movement of Assam. He received martyrdom at the age of 12 in 1972, during a movement led by All Assam Students’ Union.

Assam Sahitya Sabha has instituted an award in his honour, which is awarded every year in the field of language.

All Assam Goriya Yuva Parishad is also awarding a prize in his honour and in 2019 it was awarded to Nitumoni Saikia, editor-in-chief of a reputed news channel in Assam.

Cotton University has a hostel named in his honour and there is government primary school in his name at Assam which was established in 1975.

== See also ==
- Dark Age of the Assamese language
