= Imdad Sabri =

Indian journalist

- Born: Imad Al-Rashid Sabri; 16 October 1914; Chouriwalan, Delhi
- Died: 13 October 1988 (aged 73); Delhi
- Occupation: Journalism
- Years active: 50 years
- Known for: journalism and politics
- Notable work: History of Journalism in Urdu, History of Crime and Punishment, Jaal of Farangiyas, with Subhash Chandrapos

Imdad al-Rashid Sabri (16 October 1914 – 13 October 1988) was an Indian journalist, Councilor and former elected Deputy Governor of Delhi (Deputy Mayor).

== Early life ==
Imdad Sabri was born on 16 October 1914, in Chouriwalan, Delhi. His father Ashraf-ul-Haq Sabri was a scholar, he worked with Haji [Amdadullah Muhajir Makki] and Rashid Ahmad Ganguhi. So he combined the names of both personalities in the name of his son "Imdad al-Rashid Sabri".

== Academic and political life ==
Imdad Sabri was a journalist and writer. In his History of Urdu Journalism, he wrote a comprehensive history of journalism in three volumes. He also wrote many other books on various topics. He was the editor of several newspapers and magazines. He was the editor of Shaheeruddin Ashraf's weekly Mashhadah for years. Delhi's wall journalism i.e. publishing posters and pasting them overnight, was a hobby. His posters were unique and effective in terms of language and expression.

With academic taste, he also entered the field of politics and participated in several elections and won twice, including as Deputy Mayor of Delhi in 1977. He also held the post of Deputy Commissioner of Delhi Corporation.

== Personal life ==
Imdad Sabri has two sons, Sharaf Sabri and Ahmed Sabri.

== Authors ==
=== Books ===
Imdad Sabri authored dozens of books, some of which are as follows:

Title (Urdu)	Translated Title
تاریخ صحافت اردو (تین جلدوں میں)	History of Urdu Journalism (in three volumes)
تاریخ جرم و سزا (تین جلدوں میں)	History of Crime and Punishment (in three volumes)
فرنگیوں کا جال	The trap of the fringes
داستان پرغم	Narrative Purgham
تاریخ آزاد ہند فوج	History of Independent Indian Army
نیتاجی سبھاش چندربوس کے ساتھ	With Netaji Subhash Chandra Bose
سبھاش بابو کی تقریر	Speech by Subhash Babu
آزاد ہند فوج کا البم	Azad Hind Fauj album
1857ء کے مجاہد شعرا	Mujahid poets of 1857
1857ء کے غدار شعرا	Traitor poets of 1857
حاجی امداد اللہ اور ان کے خلفا	Haji Imdadullah and his successors
رسول خدا کا دشمنوں سے سلوک	Messenger of God's treatment of enemies
رسول خدا کی غریبوں سے محبت	The Messenger of God's love for the poor
فیضان رحمت	Faizan Rahmat
دہلی کی یادگار شخصیتیں	Memorable personalities of Delhi
دہلی کے قدیم مدارس اور مدرّس	Ancient Madrasahs and Madrasas of Delhi
سیاسی رہنماؤں کی مائیں اور بیویاں	Mothers and wives of political leaders
اللہ کے گھر میں بار بار حاضری	Frequent attendance at the house of Allah
اخبار مخبر عالم مرادآباد اور تحریک آزادی	Mokhbar Alam Moradabad Newspaper and Azadi Movement
آثار رحمت	Artifacts of Mercy
جنوبی افریقہ کے اردو شاعر	Urdu Poets of South Africa
روح صحافت	The Spirit of Journalism
روزنامچی	Roznamche

=== Notable works ===
"Tarikh-e-Sahafat-e-Urdu" (تاریخ صحافت اردو) or "History of Urdu Journalism," is considered one of the most comprehensive works for Urdu Journalist.

== Death ==
On 13 October 1988, after being ill for some time, he died in Delhi at the age of 74 and was buried in Mehndiyan cemetery.
