= Imdad Chandio =

Pakistani politician

Imdad Chandio (Urdu: ﺍﻣﺪﺍﺩ چانڈیو) is a Pakistani politician who served as a food and finance minister of Sindh in the 1990s. He was a member of Pakistan Muslim League (N) (PML-N) Sindh until 2017 when he joined Pakistan Peoples Party.

In 2014, Chandio was appointed as the central vice president of PML-N.
