= Muhammad Muzammil Basyuni =

Indonesian diplomat

Muhammad Muzammil Basyuni (born October 7, 1947) is an Indonesian diplomat.

Born in Rembang Central Java, Muzammil served as the Indonesian Ambassador to Syria. He was nominated for the position by President Susilo Bambang Yudhoyono and sworn in on October 18, 2006.
