= IEEE Communications Surveys and Tutorials =

Academic journal

- Discipline: Telecommunication technology
- Language: English
- Edited by: Dusit (Tao) Niyato

Publication details
- Former name(s): IEEE Communications Surveys
- History: 1998–present
- Publisher: IEEE
- Frequency: Quarterly
- Open access: Hybrid
- Impact factor: 35.6 (2022)

Standard abbreviations
- ISO 4: IEEE Commun. Surv. Tutor.

Indexing
- ISSN: 2373-745X (print); 1553-877X (web)
- LCCN: 2004216372
- OCLC no.: 57216796

Links
- Journal homepage; Online access

IEEE Communications Surveys & Tutorials is a quarterly peer-reviewed academic journal published by the IEEE Communications Society for tutorials and surveys covering all aspects of the communications field. The journal publishes both original articles and reprints of articles featured in other IEEE Communication Society journals. It was established in 1998 and the editor-in-chief is Dusit (Tao) Niyato (Nanyang Technological University). According to the Journal Citation Reports, the journal has a 2022 impact factor of 35.6.
