= Md. Emdadul Huq =

Bangladeshi Judge

Justice of the High Court Division of Bangladesh

Personal details
- Profession: Judge

Md. Emdadul Huq is a judge of the High Court Division of the Bangladesh Supreme Court.

== Early life ==
Emdadul Huq was born on 16 October 1956 in Gopalganj District. He completed his bachelor's degree in law from the University of Rajshahi.

== Career ==
After Emdadul Huq graduated, he worked as a lawyer in the Rajshahi District Court on 11 March 1985. On 13 April 1987, Emdadul Huq became a lawyer of the High Court Division. Emdadul Huq was appointed a lawyer of the High Division of the Bangladesh Supreme Court on 27 February 2001.

Emdadul Huq was appointed an additional judge in the High Court Division on 23 August 2004 and was made a permanent judge on 23 August 2006.

Emdadul Huq was one of nineteen judges who filed an appeal with the Bangladesh Supreme Court on 28 July 2008 challenging a High Court verdict which ordered the government to appoint ten permanent judges to the High Court Division whose appointment was not confirmed by the previous Bangladesh Nationalist Party government. On 30 July 2008, Emdadul Huq and Justice Sharif Uddin Chaklader issued a verdict halting corruption cases against six accused and granting them bail. The six accused were Syed Abdullah Muhammad Taher, former Bangladesh Jamaat-e-Islami member of parliament, M. A. Hashem, former Bangladesh Nationalist Party member of parliament and owner of Partex Group, Sayeed Hossain Chowdhury, owner of HRC Group, Giridhari Lal Modi, founder of Uttara Group, Syed Galib Ahmed, director of Global Agro Trade (Pvt) Company Limited (GATCO Group), and Syed Tanveer Ahmed, director of Global Agro Trade (Pvt) Company Limited (GATCO Group).

On 18 November 2009, Emdadul Huq and Justice AFM Abdur Rahman issued a sua sponte ruling asking Minister of Home Affairs Sahara Khatun to explain extrajudicial killings within 48 hours. The verdict was given following a news report on extrajudicial killings. Sahara Khatun denied there had been any extrajudicial killings since her government came to power. He canceled the parliamentary membership of Abdul Kashem, a Jatiya Party politician, for being a loan defaulter.

Emdadul Huq was a commissioner of the fifth Bangladesh Judicial Service Commission in 2011.

On 6 December 2017, Emdadul Huq declared the parliamentary membership of Nizam Uddin Hazari illegal while his fellow judge on the bench, Justice FRM Nazmul Ahsan, disagreed with the verdict resulting in a split verdict. The case went to Justice Md Abu Zafor Siddique who issued a verdict in favor of Nizam Uddin Hazari.

On 12 February 2020, Emdadul Huq and Justice Md Akram Hossain Chowdhury issued an order asking the government to explain why the detention of Shariat Sarkar should not be declared illegal. He had been detained under the Digital Security Act for saying that he would pay clerics if they could prove singing was forbidden in Islam at a concert in Dhamrai.
