= Muhammad Zahirul Islam =

Bangladeshi military officer

- Military career
- Allegiance: Bangladesh
- Branch: Bangladesh Army
- Service years: 1988–2024
- Rank: Major General
- Service number: BA - 3501
- Unit: East Bengal Regiment
- Commands: GOC of 33rd Infantry Division; MGO of Army Headquarters; Commander of Logistics Area; Chairman of Bangladesh Tea Board; Commander of 81st Infantry Brigade

Muhammad Zahirul Islam is a retired major general of the Bangladesh Army. He is now on LPR. Before that, he served as master general of ordnance at army headquarters. Prior to joining there, he was commander of the logistics area of Dhaka Cantonment. He is the chief patron of Baridhara Scholars' International School and College. He was the vice-president of Kurmitola Golf Club. He was the senior vice-president of the Bangladesh Golf Federation.

== Career ==
Islam was a faculty member at the National Defence College of the Bangladesh Army.

On 29 July 2020, Islam was transferred from the Bangladesh Army to the Ministry of Commerce and made chairperson of the Bangladesh Tea Board. Under him, the Bangladesh Tea Board organized the National Tea Day in June 2021. He is the founding chairperson of Camellia Open Sky School, a charity school for children of tea workers.
