= Zahurul Haque =

Zahurul Haque (Bengali: জহূরুল হক) is a Bengali masculine given name of Arabic origin and may refer to:

== People ==
- Zohurul Hoque (1926–2017), Indian Islamic scholar and doctor
- Zahurul Haq (1935–1969), Bengali sergeant in the Pakistan Air Force
- Jahurul Haque Sardar, Bangladeshi politician

== See also ==
- Zahurul Islam (disambiguation)
