= Muzammil Hussain (general) =

Pakistani former army officer

- Title: Chairman of WAPDA (former), Chairman of Pakistan Boxing Federation
- Term: 2017-2022

Muzammil Hussain is a former senior officer in the Pakistan Army and former chairman of Pakistan's Water and Power Development Authority (WAPDA).

== Early life and education ==
Lieutenant General Muzammil Hussain (retired) hails from the renowned village of Mohra Karim Baksh, in the district of Jhelum. He joined the Pakistan Army in 1976, after completing his education at the Islamabad College for Boys.

== Military career ==
He received his military training in an elite infantry battalion of the Baloch Regiment (Sarbakaf 12) and demonstrated exceptional professionalism and skill early on in his career. In addition, he also excelled in various sports. He completed his staff course and was deputed to Saudi Arabia during the Gulf War in 1990. He served as a brigade major of an independent infantry brigade in Tabuk, Jhelum, and Dadu, and participated in anti-dacoit operations in Sindh.

Lt. Gen. Hussain also underwent courses in France and Indonesia, later commanding his parent battalion. He was appointed as a directing staff at the Command and Staff College. Following his tenure as a Defence Attaché in Jakarta, Canberra, Singapore, and Seoul as a Colonel, he commanded an infantry brigade during the escalation of 2001. He completed the War Course and was subsequently posted to the prestigious position of chief instructor at the Command and Staff College Quetta. Later, he became the chief of staff in an important corps in Gujranwala before his promotion to major general and posting to the prestigious division guarding the frontier in the Siachen and Kargil sectors - the Force Command Northern Area (FCNA). After a successful command, he remained on the Training Branch and was promoted to the coveted position of inspector general training and evaluation (IGT&E). He retired as the 30 Corps Commander in 2013 after 37 years of a brilliant career in the Army.

Lt. General Muzammil Hussain (retired) was awarded the Hilal-i-Imtiaz (Military) for his services. This is a high-level military award in Pakistan, given for exceptional service and devotion to duty.

== Post-retirement ==
During his six-year tenure as Chairman of WAPDA from 2016 to 2022, Lt. General Muzammil Hussain oversaw an unprecedented transformation of the organization, which significantly improved Pakistan's energy and water sectors. Under his leadership, WAPDA initiated several large-scale hydropower projects, including the 800 MW Mohmand Dam, 2,160 MW Dasu Dam, and 4,320 MW Diamer-Basha Dam, which are expected to add approximately 43 Billion Units of power to Pakistan's national grid by 2028. Of notable mention is the construction of the K-IV Water Supply Project, which is aimed at providing 650 million gallons of water per day to Karachi, was initiated during his tenure.

One of General Hussain's most significant achievements was WAPDA's successful raising of its debut green Euro bond, which raised $500 million for the construction of new hydropower projects. The issuance marked a major milestone in Pakistan's financial history, making WAPDA the first Pakistani parastatal to raise foreign investment without government guarantees and without pledging any assets.

During his tenure, WAPDA also took several steps to modernize and digitize its operations. The organization implemented an enterprise resource planning (ERP) system to improve its financial management, and it established a project management unit (PMU) to manage the construction of hydropower projects. In addition, WAPDA established a research and development (R&D) center to develop new technologies for the efficient utilization of water and energy resources.

In 2021, he was asked to continue serving as the chairman of WAPDA for another term of 5 years, but he resigned in 2022 for personal reasons.

== Decade of Dams ==
Former Chairman WAPDA, Lt. General (R) Muzammil Hussain initiated WAPDA's "Decade of Dams" initiative. The Decade of Dams refers to a significant period of dam construction and development in Pakistan led by the Water and Power Development Authority (WAPDA). During this period, WAPDA played a crucial role in the planning, designing, construction, and operation of large dams across the country.

Lt. General (R) Muzammil Hussain, as the former chairman of WAPDA, played a pivotal role in driving this ambitious initiative. Under his leadership, WAPDA focused on harnessing the water resources of Pakistan through the construction of multipurpose dams. These dams aimed to address the country's water and energy needs, enhance agricultural productivity, mitigate floods, and provide clean drinking water and irrigation facilities.

Hussain's expertise and strategic vision played a significant role in the successful implementation of various dam projects. He spearheaded initiatives to accelerate dam construction, ensuring adherence to international standards, environmental sustainability, and the welfare of local communities.

His contributions encompassed the development of major dams such as the Diamer-Bhasha Dam, Dasu Dam, and Mohmand Dam. These projects are expected to enhance water storage capacity, generate significant hydropower, and facilitate irrigation and flood control measures. Muzammil Hussain's emphasis on transparency, efficiency, and adherence to best practices helped in overcoming challenges and achieving milestones in the Decade of Dams.

In light of his contributions, Lt. General (R) Muzammil Hussain, former chairman of WAPDA, was invited to deliver the keynote address at the closing session of the 27th Congress of the International Commission on Large Dams (ICOLD). The conference took place in Marseille, France, from May 27 to June 3, 2022, and saw the participation of over 1400 experts from around the world. Lt. General (R) Muzammil Hussain received this honor in recognition of his significant contributions to the development of large dams in Pakistan. ICOLD is an organization dedicated to the exchange of professional information, knowledge, and standards related to the design, construction, maintenance, and impact of large dams. With 104 member countries, ICOLD plays a leading role in ensuring the safe, efficient, and environmentally sustainable construction and operation of dams. Their technical guidelines, which are based on the latest knowledge, serve as the foundation for designing and constructing projects in accordance with ICOLD standards.

== Controversy ==
In 2022, NAB initiated an unfounded inquiry based on an “unconfirmed complaint” on Tarbela 4th Extension against the Former Chairman WAPDA, citing misuse of authority and loss to the government exchequer. The inquiry is widely regarded as baseless as the project, funded by World Bank, was successfully completed and in compliance with the agency's strict operational guidelines. The World Bank regards it as “a rare hydropower project in the world” which was commissioned “on time” in 2018, “at lesser cost”. The project produces energy worth $2 billion, which is much higher than planned in PC1, and is about three times the cost of the project.
