= Khodeza Emdad Lata =

Bangladeshi politician

Member of Bangladesh Parliament
- In office 2005–2006

Personal details
- Party: Bangladesh Nationalist Party

Khodeza Emdad Lata is a Bangladesh Nationalist Party politician and a former member of the Bangladesh Parliament from a reserved seat.

== Career ==
Lata was elected to parliament from a reserved seat as a Bangladesh Nationalist Party candidate in 2005.

In March 2008, Lata joined with other members of parliament from the Awami League, Bangladesh Nationalist Party, and Jatiya Party to oppose a move by the neutral Caretaker government to evict them from NAM buildings, renamed to Sangsad Sadasya Bhaban in 2006.
