= Ziaul Hasan Siddiqui =

Ziaul Hasan Siddiqui was the chairman of Sonali Bank Limited. He is a former deputy governor of Bangladesh Bank. In 2024, he was forced to resign from the position of chairman of Sonali Bank due to allegations of irregularities after the revolution of students in the wake of the quota reform movement in Bangladesh.

== Early life and education ==
Siddiqui completed his bachelor's and master's in economics from the University of Dhaka in 1973 and 1974 respectively.

Siddiqui completed his second master's in public administration from Harvard University in 1989.

== Career ==
Siddiqui taught at BRAC University in the school of business.

In 2010, as the deputy governor of Bangladesh Bank, Siddiqui sought to bring back money laundered by Arafat Rahman Koko, son of Prime Minister Khaleda Zia.

Siddiqui was the deputy governor of Bangladesh Bank from 2006 to 2011. He joined Prime Bank as an advisor after leaving Bangladesh Bank in 2012. He was a director of AB Bank.

On 21 August 2019, Siddiqui was appointed chairman of Sonali Bank for a three-year term by the Financial Institutions Division of the Ministry of Finance. In 2020, he committed to work with the Bangladesh Financial Intelligence Unit.

Siddiqui launched Blaze services of Sonali Bank in partnership with IT Consultants Limited on 25 August 2021 with Sajeeb Wazed Joy, son of Prime Minister Sheikh Hasina, as chief guest. Special guests at the event were Zunaid Ahmed Palak, state minister of ICT, and Ahmed Jamal, deputy governor of Bangladesh Bank. He is a director of PBL Exchange (UK) Limited. After the fall of the Sheikh Hasina led Awami League government, Siddiqui resigned from Sonali Bank and was replaced by Mohammad Muslim Chowdhury.
