= Rezaul Haque =

Rezaul Haque (Bengali: রেজাউল হক, lit. 'Pleasure of Al Haqq') is a Bengali masculine given name of Arabic origin. It may refer to:

- Rezaul Haque Chowdhury (born 1954), Bangladeshi politician
- Quazi Reza-Ul Hoque (born 1958), High Court justice
- Md. Rezaul Haque (born 1960), High Court justice
- Rezaul Haque (cricketer) (born 1982), Bangladeshi cricketer
- Rezaul Haque Sarkar, Bangladeshi politician

== See also ==
- Reyazul Haque
