= Zain Haq =

Pakistani climate activist

Mohammad Zain Ul Haq (Zain Haq)
- Citizenship: Pakistan
- Education: Simon Fraser University
- Organizations: Extinction Rebellion; Save Old Growth
- Known for: Environmental activism, Civil Disobedience, Nonviolence
- Spouse: Sophia Jane Papp (married 2023--present)

Mohammad Zain Ul Haq (Zain Haq) (born January 17, 2001) is a climate change activist, who rose to prominence in Vancouver, Canada, for several campaigns demanding action on the climate crisis.

He successfully led a hunger strike campaign at the Simon Fraser University that led the university to divest its investments in fossil fuels projects. He is also known for being a spokesperson for Extinction Rebellion and the Save Old Growth campaign that demanded an end to old growth logging in British Columbia.

In June, 2022, the Canada Border Services Agency (CBSA) revoked his student visa at the height of his activism stating that Haq was not 'on track to degree completion'; and resulted in Haq losing status in Canada. Since then, SFU has since published a letter stating that Haq was on-track for degree completion and is permanently eligible to return to SFU and complete his studies at a future date.

In January, 2025, Zain was deported from Canada to Pakistan despite prior Ministerial intervention by former Immigration Minister, Marc Miller.

== Biography ==
Haq is originally from Karachi, Pakistan, where the 12-year-old began his climate activism by raising funds for the victims of the 2013 Pakistan–Afghanistan floods. In 2019, he moved to Canada to study economics at Simon Fraser University, in British Columbia. He joined local branches of several environmental groups, including Extinction Rebellion and later co-founded Save Old Growth.

In November 2021, Simon Fraser University announced that it would be divesting from fossil fuels after a group of students including Haq threatened a hunger strike.

Haq has been arrested multiple times in relation with his climate activism. In September 2021, he was arrested for blocking tree clearing for the Trans Mountain pipeline, being sentenced to 14 days imprisonment for criminal contempt of court. In October 2021, he was arrested after taking part in a demonstration blocking the main road to the Vancouver International Airport. On June 6, 2023, Haq was noted for his "disdain for the rule of law" and was sentenced in Provincial Court of British Columbia to a 7 day jail sentence, followed by another 61 days of conditional sentence order and a community service order.

In connection with his arrests for his climate activism, CBSA seek to deport Haq, which would make him one of the first cases in Canadian history of a climate activist being deported. In June 2022, the CBSA issued a warrant for his arrest, accusing him of violating his student visa and ordering him to leave Canada voluntarily. His student visa has since been revoked.

Zain married fellow activist Sophia Jane Papp in 2023 at a community center in Vancouver.
