= Azizul Haque (Bogra politician) =

Bangladeshi politician

- আজিজুল হক

Member of Parliament for Bogra-8
- In office 18 February 1979 – 12 February 1982
- Preceded by: AK Mujibur Rahman
- Succeeded by: Seats abolished

Personal details
- Party: Bangladesh Nationalist Party

Ajijul Haque is a Bangladeshi politician. In 1979, he was elected to parliament for the Bogra-8 district as a Bangladesh Nationalist Party representative.

== Career ==
Azizul Haque was elected a member of parliament for the Bogra-8 constituency as a Bangladesh Nationalist Party candidate in the 1979 Bangladeshi general election.
