= Ajmeri Hoque =

American judge (born c. 1984)

Ajmeri Hoque (c.1984) is the elected Franklin County Municipal Court judge in the state of Ohio. On November 4, 2025, she became the first Muslim judge elected in Ohio and the first naturalized citizen to be a judge in Franklin County.

== Personal life and education ==
Hoque was born circa 1984 in Bangladesh. As a toddler, she immigrated with her parents to New York. Hoque's family moved to central Ohio in 2003.

In 2006, Hoque graduated with a bachelor's degree in political science from The Ohio State University. In 2010, she graduated from Capital University Law School with a Juris Doctor.

Hoque is married.

== Career ==
In 2014, Hoque became the Assistant Prosecutor for the City of Lancaster City Prosecutor's Office.

In 2021, Hoque ran as a candidate for Dublin City Council Ward 1. She lost the election to Amy Kramb, who received 55.2% (1330) of the votes compared to Hoque's 44..8% (1079). Hoque also served as a committee member to the Police Chief’s Advisory Committee in Dublin since 2020 and was the vice chairperson for the committee in 2021 and 2022. She also runs her own private legal practice, The Law Offices of Ajmeri Hoque, where she practices criminal defense law.

In 2025, Hoque ran unopposed and became the Franklin County Municipal Court judge. She received endorsements from the Franklin County Democratic Party, Ohio Working Families Party, Columbus Education Association, Indian American Impact, Asian American Midwest Progressives, and Run for Something. After winning the election on November 4, 2025, Hoque became the first Muslim judge elected in Ohio and the first naturalized citizen to be a judge in Franklin County, receiving more than 133,000 votes. She will take office in January 2026. She will be succeeding retiring Judge James Green, who served more than 30 years on the bench.

Hoque also represented several student activists who were protesting the Gaza war and were arrested by The Ohio State University police.
