= Haque Academy =

Private school in Karachi

Location
- 208-A 32nd Street, Phase VIII, DHA; Karachi, Sindh; Pakistan; 24°46′39″N 67°03′59″E

Information
- Type: Co-educational school
- Established: 1977
- Founder: Mrs. Marcia Haque
- Director: Maria Haque
- Classes offered: Prep to O Levels
- Affiliation: Mrs. Haque's School
- Website: haqueacademy.edu.pk

Haque Academy is a co-educational school in Phase VIII, DHA, Karachi, Pakistan. Founded in 1977 as a nursery school established by Mrs. Haque, the institution expanded into a larger school, with Haque Academy opening its purpose-built campus in 2008. The school provides education from Kindergarten to O Levels. Its associated school, Mrs. Haque's School, provides early years education from Prep to Nursery.

The school offers a learning environment that includes academic classrooms, science laboratories, a library, an art room, music facilities, an auditorium and outdoor spaces for sports and recreation.

== History ==
Haque Academy traces its origins to 1977 when Mrs. Marcia Haque established a nursery school to provide early childhood education. The institution subsequently expanded its educational provision and Haque Academy was launched in 2008 with the opening of a purpose-built campus.

The school continued to develop its facilities with the inauguration of the Shan ul Haque Memorial Building in 2018. Haque Academy and Mrs. Haque's School form part of the same educational centre, serving students at different stages of their early, middle and senior years education.

== Campus and facilities ==
Haque Academy provides education from Kindergarten through O Levels.

The campus is located at 208-A, 32nd Street, Phase VIII, Defence Housing Authority, Karachi. It includes classrooms and specialist learning facilities, including science laboratories, a library, an art room, music facilities and an auditorium. Outdoor areas provide space for sports and recreational activities.

== Mrs. Haque's School ==
Mrs. Haque's School is the early years school associated with Haque Academy. Established in 1977 as a nursery school, it provides education from Prep to Nursery. It operates on the Haque Academy campus.
