= Izhar ul Haq =

Izhar ul Haq may refer to:

- Izhar ul-Haqq, an 1864 book by Rahmatullah Kairanawi
- Muhammad Izhar ul Haq (born 1948), Pakistani columnist and poet

== See also ==
- Izharulhaq Naveed (born 2003), Afghan cricketer
- Isar ul-Haq Qasmi (died 1991), Pakistani Islamic scholar
- Israr-ul-Haq (born 1994), Pakistani cricketer
