= Muzammil Illyas =

Sri Lankan cricketer (born 1974)

Muzammil Illyas (born 13 December 1974) was a Sri Lankan cricketer. He was a right-handed batsman and right-arm off-break bowler who played for Moors Sports Club. He was born in Colombo.

Ilyas made a single first-class appearance for the side, during the 1995–96 season, against Nondescripts Cricket Club. From the tailend, he failed to score a run in either innings in which he batted.

He conceded 23 runs from 3 overs of bowling, as Moors lost the match by an innings margin.
