= Syed Emdad Ali =

Bengali poet and writer

- সৈয়দ এমদাদ আলী
- Born: 1875; Munshiganj District, Bengal Presidency, British India
- Died: 1956 (aged 75–76)

Syed Emdad Ali (1875–1956), was a Bengali poet and writer. He was born in Munshiganj District, Bengal, now in Bangladesh. He was against the use of highly Sanskritised vocabulary in Bangla as well as the unnecessary use of Persian and Arabic words. A liberal humanist, Emdad Ali believed in communal harmony.

== Early life ==
Ali was born in 1875 in Bikrampur, Bengal Presidency, British India. He graduated from Munshiganj High School and Jagannath College (which is Jagannath University today). He did not pursue further studies due to financial issues.

== Career ==
Ali taught at a school in Netrokona District after college. He joined the British Indian Imperial Police as a Sub-Inspector. He was awarded the title Khan Shahib for by British Indian government for his service. He was against the inclusion of Arabic, Persian, and Sanskrit words in the Bengali language.

In 1903, he joined Nandoor, a Bengali monthly journal as an editor. In one of his editorials, he wrote, 'The development of the downtrodden Muslim community will be achieved only through literary activities. We invite all Muslim writers in Bangla to join in our endeavour to awaken the Muslims of this country'.

Ali worked for many departments. He was the chief editor of monthly 'Nabanoor' (1903–06) with collaborations from M. Asad Ali, M. Hedayetullah and Qazi Imdadul Haq.

== Works ==
His literary works were included in the curriculum of school level, secondary and higher secondary Bengali Literature in Bangladesh.

Main Books

- Dali
- Taposhi Rabeya (Rabeya the Pious)

== Death ==
Ali died in 1956.
