= Jahurul Islam Medical College =

Private medical college in Kishoreganj, Bangladesh

- জহুরুল ইসলাম মেডিকেল কলেজ
- Logo of Jahurul Islam Medical College
- Type: Private medical college
- Established: 1992
- Academic affiliations: University of Dhaka
- Chairman: Manzurul Islam
- Principal: Md. Sayeed Hasan
- Academic staff: 152 (2018)
- Students: 512 (2018)
- Location: Bhagalpur, Bajitpur Upazila, Kishoreganj District, Bangladesh; 24.1993°N 90.9166°E
- Campus: Urban
- Language: English
- Website: jimedcol.org

Jahurul Islam Medical College (JIMC) (Bengali: জহুরুল ইসলাম মেডিকেল কলেজ), established in 1992 by Jahurul Islam, is the second oldest private medical college in Bangladesh.

It is located at Bhagalpur in Bajitpur Upazila of Kishoreganj District. The college has an area of about 52.62 acres. It is affiliated to University of Dhaka as a constituent college.

It offers a five-year course of study leading to a Bachelor of Medicine, Bachelor of Surgery (MBBS) degree. A one-year internship after graduation is compulsory for all graduates. The degree is recognised by the Bangladesh Medical and Dental Council.

== History ==
Industrialist and philanthropist Jahurul Islam set the college up, through the Aftab–Rahima Welfare Trust, several healthcare organisations in his home village of Bhagalpur. The first two, in 1989, were what was initially a 250-bed hospital that would become Jahurul Islam Medical College Hospital, and Jahurul Islam Nursing Training Institute. Jahurul Islam Medical College followed in 1992.

== Campus ==
Jahurul Islam Medical College Hospital building-1.

The college is located in the village of Bhagalpur, in Bajitpur Upazila of Kishoreganj District, about 500 metres (1,600 ft) from Bajitpur Railway Station. It is the first medical school in Bangladesh situated in a rural area. Within the self-contained campus, arranged among gardens around an S-shaped lake, are an academic building, separate hostels for men and women, staff quarters, and Jahurul Islam Medical College Hospital, the college's 390-bed teaching hospital. The final phase of hospital construction will expand capacity to 500 beds.

Jahurul Islam Nursing Training Institute shares the campus. It is approved by the Bangladesh Nursing Council and the Directorate of Nurses Services (DNS).

== Organization and administration ==
The college is affiliated to Dhaka University as a constituent college. The chairman of the college is Manzurul Islam. The principal is Md. Sayeed Hasan

== Academics ==
The college offers a five-year course of study, approved by the Bangladesh Medical and Dental Council (BMDC), leading to a Bachelor of Medicine, Bachelor of Surgery (MBBS) degree from Dhaka University. After passing the final professional examination, there is a compulsory one-year internship. The internship is a prerequisite for obtaining registration from the BMDC to practice medicine. The academic calendar runs from January through December. In October 2014, the Ministry of Health and Family Welfare capped admission and tuition fees at private medical colleges at 1,990,000 Bangladeshi taka (US$25,750 as of 2014) total for their five-year courses.

Admission for Bangladeshis to the MBBS programme at all medical colleges in Bangladesh (government and private) is conducted centrally by the Directorate General of Health Services (DGHS). It administers a written multiple choice question exam simultaneously throughout the country. Candidates are admitted based primarily on their score on this test, although grades at Secondary School Certificate (SSC) and Higher Secondary School Certificate (HSC) level also play a part. 50% of seats are reserved for foreign students. Admission for foreign students is based on their SSC and HSC grades. Most foreign students who attend are Indian nationals or Nepalis. As of July 2014, the college is allowed to admit 100 students annually.

== Alumni ==
In the year 2002 an association of the ex-students, namely Jahurul Islam Medical College Ex-students' Association was founded. Salina Jalal is the current (June 2016 – present) president of the association.

== See also ==
- List of medical colleges in Bangladesh
- Pakundia Adarsha Mohila College
- Shahid Syed Nazrul Islam Medical College
