= Nur ul-Haq =

Noor ul-Haq (Arabic: نور الحق) is an Arabic phrase formed from the elements Noor, al- and Haqq, meaning light of truth. It may refer to:

- Nurul Huq (naval officer) (born 1922), Bangladesh Navy officer
- Sheikh Md. Nurul Haque (born 1940), Bangladesh Awami League Member of Parliament
- Nur ul-Haq Ulumi (born 1941), Afghan politician
- Nurul Haq Nur (born 1991), Bangladeshi student activist
- Noor-ul-Haq (cricketer) (born 1992), Afghan cricketer
- Nurul Huq Bhuiyan, Bengali activist
- Nurul Huq Choudhury, Bangladeshi politician
- Nurul Haque (Noakhali politician)
- Nurul Haque (Dhaka politician)
- Nurul Haque Manik, Bangladeshi footballer
- Nurul Haque Miah, professor at Dhaka College
- Noor-ul-Haq Qadri, Pakistani politician

== See also ==
- Noor-ul-Haq (book), written by Mirza Ghulam Ahmad, the founder of the Ahmadiyya Movement in 1894
