= Mozammel Haque Samaji =

Bangladeshi politician

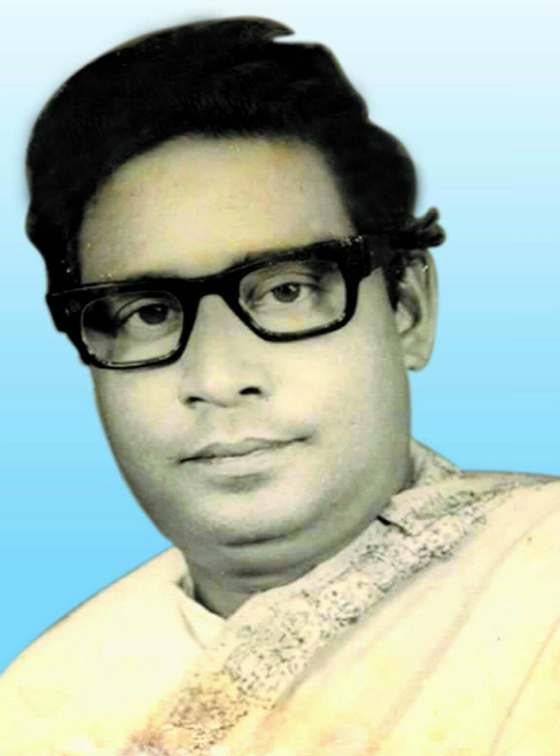
- A black and white portrait of Principal Mozammel Haque Samaji.

Member of Bangladesh Parliament
- In office 1973–1976

Personal details
- Party: Bangladesh Awami League

Mozammel Haque Samaji (Bengali: মোজাম্মেল হক সমাজী) is a Bangladesh Awami League politician and a former member of parliament for Dhaka-11.

== Career ==
Samaji was elected to parliament from Dhaka-11 as an Awami League candidate in 1973.
