= Ziaul Haque =

Pakistani economic historian (died 1998)

Ziaul Haque (died 1998) was a Pakistani scholar of economic history and Islamic studies, who worked in the Islamic Research Institute in Islamabad from September 1964 to June 1984 as researcher and associate professor. Later he would join the Pakistan Institute of Development Economics, Islamabad, as a consultant and rose up to the position of chief of research there.

== Education and career ==
Haque was educated at the University of Sindh and the University of Chicago, focusing on subjects like Economics, Arabic and Islamic studies. He migrated from East Punjab during partition to Sukkur, taught at Railway's high school for sometime. Haque died on 8 August 1998. He read many languages and had a wide interest in several social sciences. Having a strong command in 7 languages, including German and Spanish, Haque was an active member of research bodies in many countries. His contributions have enriched the social science discourse, especially in Islamic economics and initial Islamic economic development.

He specialized in the economic history of early Islam and the Middle East, and also wrote extensively about the current economic issues in Islamic countries. He served as editor of the quarterly research journal Islamic Studies, and also as associate editor of The Pakistan Development Review and South Asia Bulletin.

Among Haque's publications were the books Prophets and Progress in Islam (Kuala Lumpur: Utusan, 2008); Landlord and Peasant in Early Islam (Islamabad, 1977); Islam and Feudalism: The Economics of RIBA, Interest and Profit (1985), later expanded as RIBA: The Moral Economy of Usury, Interest and Profit (Kuala Lumpur: Ikraq, 1995); and Revelation and Revolution in Islam (1987).
