= Azizul Haque (Naxalite activist) =

Indian revolutionary, writer, and veteran Naxalite leader (1942–2025)

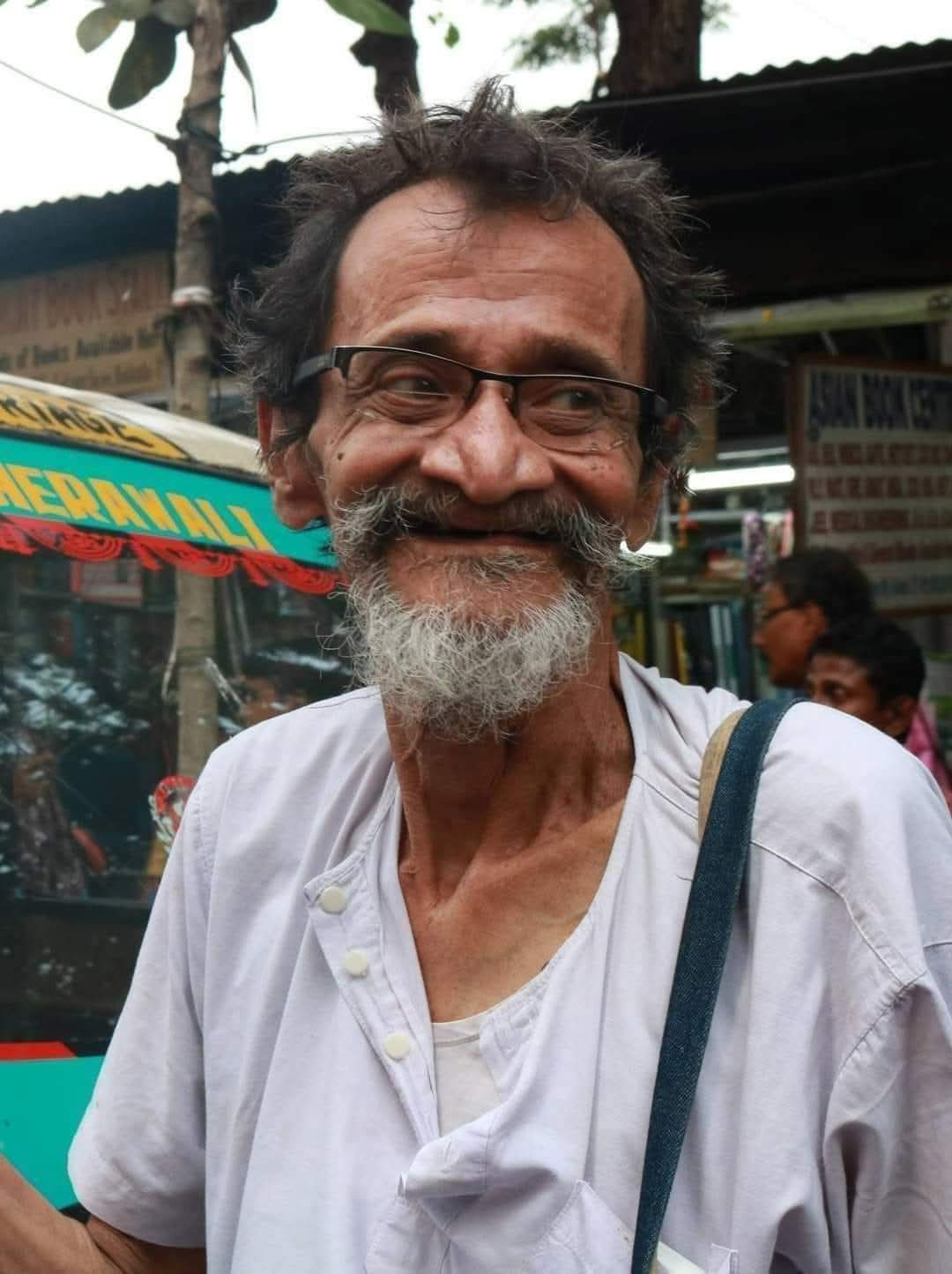
- Azizul Haque in his later years
- Born: 28 August 1942; Ranmahal, Uluberia Subdivision, Howrah, Bengal, British India
- Died: 21 July 2025 (aged 82); Kolkata, West Bengal, India
- Education: Presidency College, Kolkata
- Occupations: Political leader, writer
- Known for: Naxalbari movement, Karagare Atharo Bochor

Azizul Haque (28 August 1942 – 21 July 2025) was an Indian revolutionary, political leader, and writer from West Bengal, known for his participation in the Naxalite movement and his memoir, Karagare Atharo Bochor (Eighteen Years in Prison). He was the head of the Second Central Committee of the Communist Party of India (Marxist–Leninist).

== Early life ==
Haque was born on 28 August 1942 in Ranmahal, Uluberia Subdivision, Howrah district, Bengal Presidency. He was born into a prominent zamindar family, locally referred to as "Mir Saheb’s Estate." According to school records, his birth date was registered as 1 February. He moved to Kolkata for higher studies and attended Presidency College.

== Political involvement ==
Haque joined the student movement in 1959 and became a member of the Communist Party of India. In a symbolic gesture of class renunciation, Haque rejected his inheritance of his family lands.

== Naxalbari movement and CPI(ML) ==
After the 1967 Naxalbari uprising, Haque aligned with Charu Mazumdar and helped build underground cells in the Sundarbans region. He was arrested in 1970 following a state-wide crackdown.

== Second Central Committee ==
After release, Haque was instrumental in forming the Second Central Committee of the CPI(ML), along with leaders such as Nishith Bhattacharya. The faction focused on rebuilding grassroots mobilization in Bengal and parts of Bihar.

== Later years and activism ==
Haque married fellow activist Manideepa Bakshi in the early 1980s. He was rearrested in 1982 and reportedly tortured during police custody. His political writings from jail were later compiled into his memoir. Widespread protests led to his release on 25 December 1989.

== Writings ==
His prison memoir, Karagare Atharo Bochor (translated: Eighteen Years in Prison), was published in 2006.

== Death ==
Azizul Haque died on 21 July 2025 at the age of 83 in Kolkata. His funeral was attended by left leaders, students, and activists. West Bengal Chief Minister Mamata Banerjee posted a condolence message online saying "Azizul Haque was a fighter, a resolute leader. In his long political career, he never bowed his head."

== Selected works ==
- Karagare Atharo Bochor (Eighteen Years in Prison), Dey's Publishing, 2006. ISBN 978-8129506399
- Naxalbari: Tirish Bochor Age Ebong Porecc (Naxalbari: Thirty years before and after), Dey's Publishing, 2023. ISBN 978-81-295-2031-9

== See also ==
- Ashim Chatterjee – Indian politician
- Charu Mazumdar – Indian Naxalite politician (1918–1972)
- Communist Party of India (Marxist–Leninist) – Far-left political party in India from 1969 to 1972
- Naxalbari uprising – Armed uprising in India
