= Mohammad Mozammel Haque =

- Born: 30 December 1964 (age 61); Munshiganj, East Pakistan, Pakistan
- Allegiance: Bangladesh
- Branch: Bangladesh Navy
- Service years: 1985 – 2023
- Rank: Rear Admiral
- Commands: Assistant Chief of Naval Staff (Personnel); Commander, Chittagong Naval Area (COMCHIT); Commander, Khulna Naval Area (COMKHUL); Chairman of Mongla Port Authority; Chairman of Bangladesh Inland Water Transport Authority; Commandant of Bangladesh Naval Academy
- Awards: Noubahini Padak (NBP); Oshamanno Sheba Padak (OSP); Nou Utkorso Padak (NUP); Commendation Padak

Mohammad Mozammel Haque (Note: (G), NBP, OSP, NUP, ndc, psc, BN) is a retired two-star officer in Bangladesh Navy who served as the assistant chief of naval staff (personnel) and the chairman of Mongla Port Authority.

== Early life and education ==
Haque was born in Munshiganj of then East Pakistan (now in Dhaka Division, Bangladesh) on 1964. His father Borhanul Haque worked in Central Superior Services until 1972 in which he was repatriated from Karachi joined the newly Bangladesh Civil Service. Haque enlisted to Bangladesh Naval Academy as officer cadet on 15 April 1982 and was commissioned in the executive Branch on 15 April 1985. Haque was a naval artillery officer and a graduate of Defence Services Command and Staff College and the National Defence College. He also acquired his honours Bachelor of Science from Behria University at Pakistan and master's degree in Strategic and Development Studies (MSDS) from Bangladesh University of Professionals.

== Military career ==
Haque commanded two warship, one small patrol craft, two naval bases and two naval areas. He was also the chairman of Mongla Port Authority on August 2019 and the Bangladesh Inland Water Transport Authority on 1 March 2015. At naval headquarters, Haque was the director of naval plans and operations. As rear admiral, Haque served as assistant chief of naval staff for personnel before going on leave per retirement.
