= 1970 Pakistani general election =

- 7 December 1970

300 of the 313 seats in the National Assembly 151 seats needed for a majority
- Registered: 56,941,500
- Turnout: 57.96%
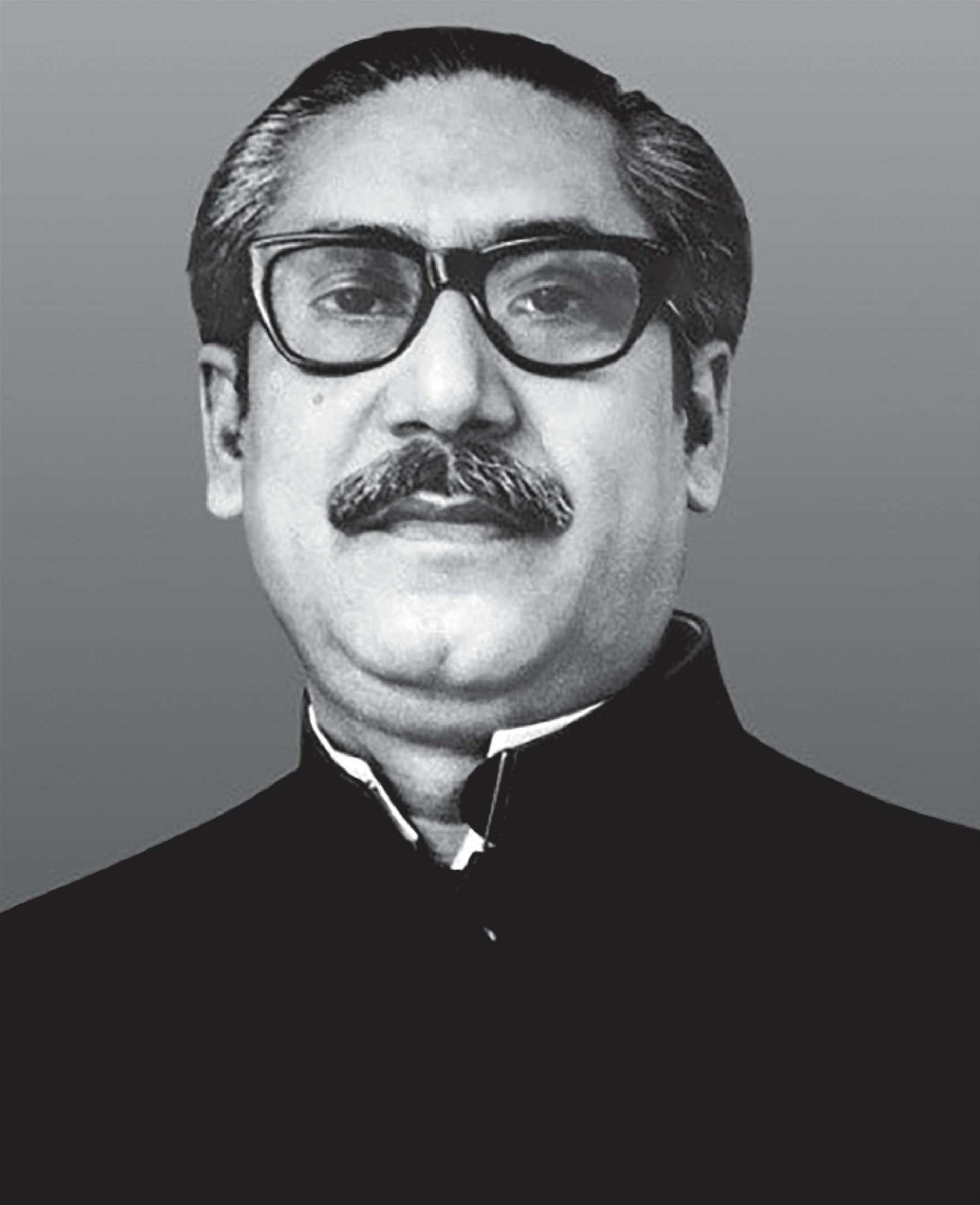

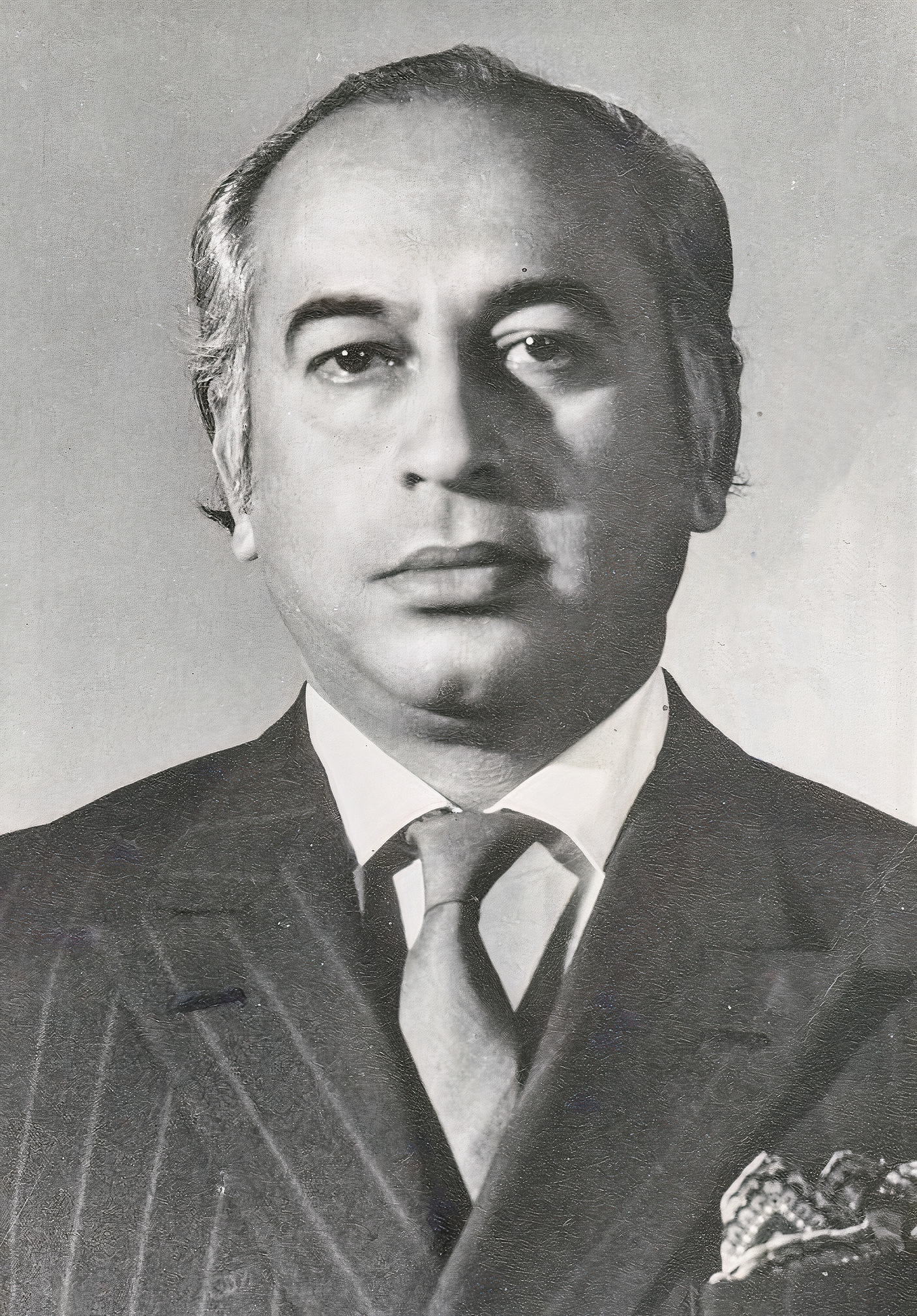
	First party	Second party
Leader	Sheikh Mujibur Rahman	Zulfikar Ali Bhutto
Party	AL	PPP
Seats won	167	86
Popular vote	12,937,162	6,148,923
Percentage	39.20%	18.63%
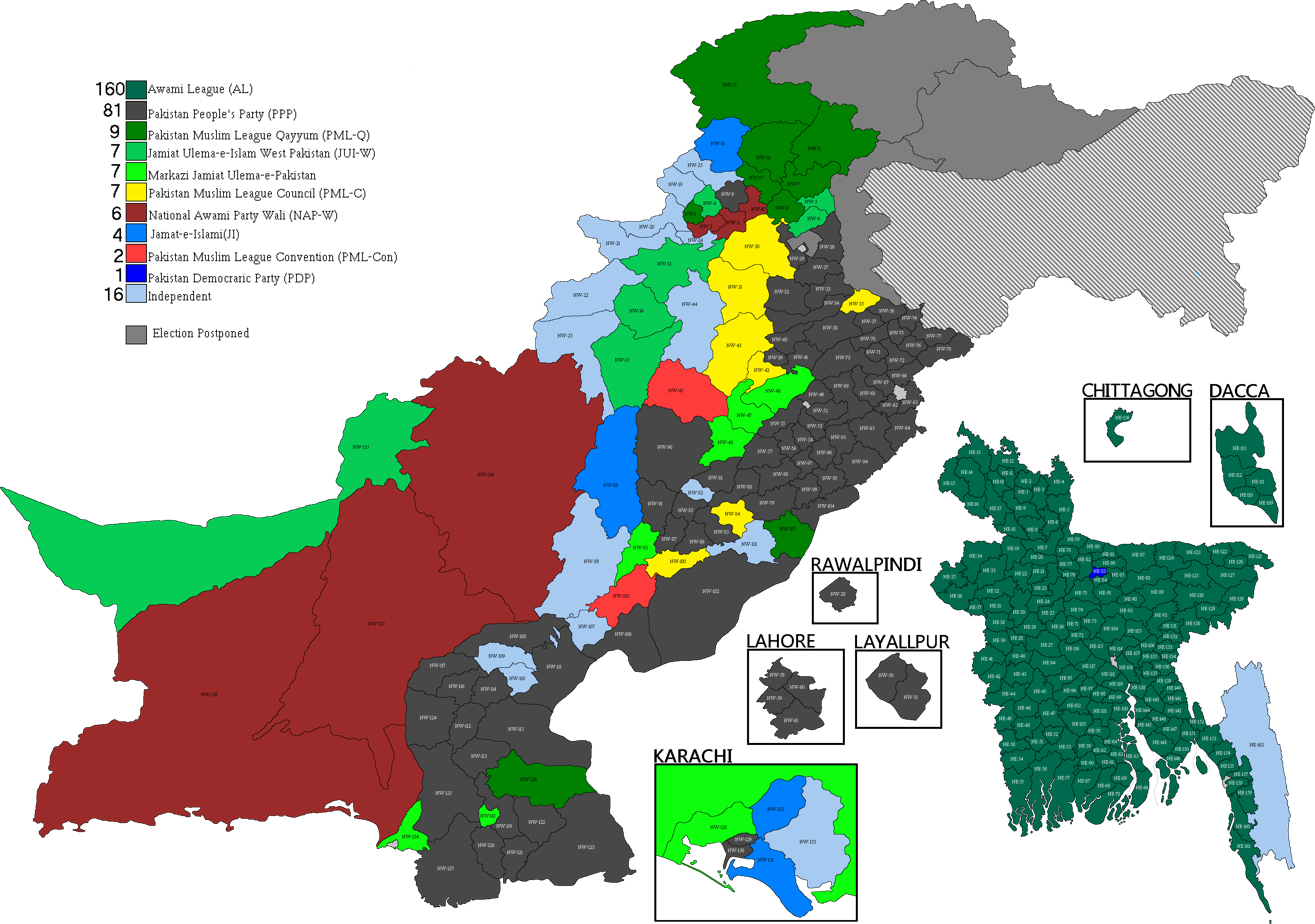
- Results by constituency
Head of government before election
Yahya Khan
Martial law
Prime Minister
Nurul Amin
PDP

General elections were held in Pakistan on 7 December 1970 to elect members of the National Assembly. They were the first direct general elections since the independence of Pakistan and ultimately the only ones held prior to the independence of Bangladesh. Voting took place in 300 general constituencies, of which 162 were in East Pakistan and 138 in West Pakistan. A further thirteen seats were reserved for women (seven of which were in East Pakistan and six of which were in West Pakistan), who were to be elected by members of the National Assembly.

The elections were a fierce contest between two social democratic parties, the west-based Pakistan Peoples Party (PPP) and the east-based All-Pakistan Awami League. The Awami League was the sole major party in the east wing, while in the west wing, the PPP faced severe competition from the conservative factions of the Muslim League, the largest of which was the Muslim League (Qayyum), as well as Islamist parties like Jamaat-e-Islami (JI), Jamiat Ulema-e-Islam (JUI), and Jamiat Ulema-e-Pakistan (JUP).

The result was a victory for the Awami League, which gained an absolute majority, winning 160 of the 162 general seats and all seven women's seats in East Pakistan. The PPP won only 81 general seats and five women's seats, all in West Pakistan. In the provincial elections held ten days later, the Awami League again dominated in East Pakistan, while the PPP were the winning party in Punjab and Sindh. The Marxist National Awami Party emerged victorious in Northwest Frontier Province and Balochistan.

The National Assembly was initially not inaugurated as President Yahya Khan and the PPP chairman Zulfikar Ali Bhutto did not want a party from East Pakistan in the federal government. Instead, Yahya appointed the veteran Bengali politician Nurul Amin as Prime Minister, asking him to reach a compromise between the PPP and Awami League. However, this move failed as the delay in inauguration had already caused significant unrest in East Pakistan. The situation deteriorated further when Operation Searchlight occurred under the orders of Yahya, resulting in a civil war that led to the formation of the independent state of Bangladesh. The Assembly was eventually inaugurated in 1972 after Yahya resigned and handed power to Zulfikar Ali Bhutto. Bhutto became prime minister in 1973 after the post was recreated by a new constitution.

== Background ==
On 23 March 1956, Pakistan changed from being a Dominion of the British Commonwealth and became an Islamic republic after framing its own constitution. Although the first general elections were scheduled for early 1959, severe political instability led President Iskander Mirza to abrogate the constitution on 7 October 1958. Mirza imposed martial law and handed power to the Commander-in-Chief of the Pakistan Army, General Muhammad Ayub Khan. After assuming the presidency, President Ayub Khan promoted himself to the rank of field marshal and appointed General Muhammad Musa Khan as the new commander-in-chief.

On 17 February 1960, President Ayub Khan appointed a commission under Muhammad Shahabuddin, the Chief Justice of Pakistan, to report a political framework for the country. The commission submitted its report on 29 April 1961, and, on the basis of this report, a new constitution was framed on 1 March 1962. The new constitution declared the country the Republic of Pakistan and brought about a presidential system of government, replacing the parliamentary system of the 1956 constitution. The electoral system was made indirect, and the "basic democrats" were declared the electoral college for the purpose of electing members of the National and Provincial Assemblies. Under the new system, presidential elections were held on 2 January 1965, which resulted in a victory for Ayub Khan. As years went by, political opposition against President Ayub Khan mounted. In East Pakistan, leader of the Awami League, Sheikh Mujibur Rahman, was one of the key leaders to rally opposition to President Ayub Khan. In 1966, he began the Six point movement for East Pakistani autonomy.

In 1968 Sheikh Mujibur Rahman was charged with sedition after the government of President Ayub Khan accused him of conspiring with India against the stability of Pakistan. While a conspiracy between Mujib and India for East Pakistan's secession was not itself conclusively proven, it is known that Mujib and the Awami League had held secret meetings with Indian government officials in 1962 and after the 1965 war. This case led to an uprising in East Pakistan, which consisted of a series of mass demonstrations and sporadic conflicts between the government forces and protesters. In West Pakistan, Zulfikar Ali Bhutto, who served as foreign minister under President Ayub Khan, resigned from his office and founded the Pakistan Peoples Party (PPP) in 1967. The socialist political party took up opposition to President Ayub Khan as well.

Ayub Khan succumbed to political pressure on 26 March 1969 and handed power to the Commander-in-Chief of the Pakistan Army, General Agha Muhammad Yahya Khan. President Yahya Khan imposed martial law, and the 1962 Constitution was abrogated. On 31 March 1970, President Yahya Khan announced a Legal Framework Order (LFO) that called for direct elections for a unicameral legislature. Many in the west feared the east wing's demand for countrywide provincial autonomy. The purpose of the LFO was to secure the future constitution, which would be written after the election so that it would include safeguards such as preserving Pakistan's territorial integrity and Islamic ideology.

The integrated province of West Pakistan under the One Unit Scheme, formed on 22 November 1954, was abolished, and Punjab, Sindh, Balochistan, and the North-West Frontier Province were revived as provinces. The principle of representation was made on the basis of population, and since East Pakistan had more people than the combined population of the four provinces of West Pakistan, the former got more than half the seats in the National Assembly. Yahya Khan ignored reports that Sheikh Mujib planned to disregard the LFO and that India was increasingly interfering in East Pakistan. Nor did he believe that the Awami League would actually sweep the elections in East Pakistan.

A month before the elections, the Bhola cyclone struck East Pakistan. This was the deadliest tropical cyclone in world history, killing an estimated 250,000-500,000 people. The government was severely criticised for its response to the disaster.

== Parties and candidates ==
The general elections of 1970 are considered one of the fairest and cleanest elections in the history of Pakistan, with about twenty-four political parties taking part. The Awami League, a Bengali nationalist party, dominated East Pakistan, while in the West the Pakistan Peoples Party, a leftist and nominally democratic socialist party, was a major power. The Pakistani government supported the pro-Islamic parties since they were committed to strong federalism. The Jamaat-e-Islami suspected that the Awami League had secessionist intentions.

=== Election campaign in East Pakistan ===
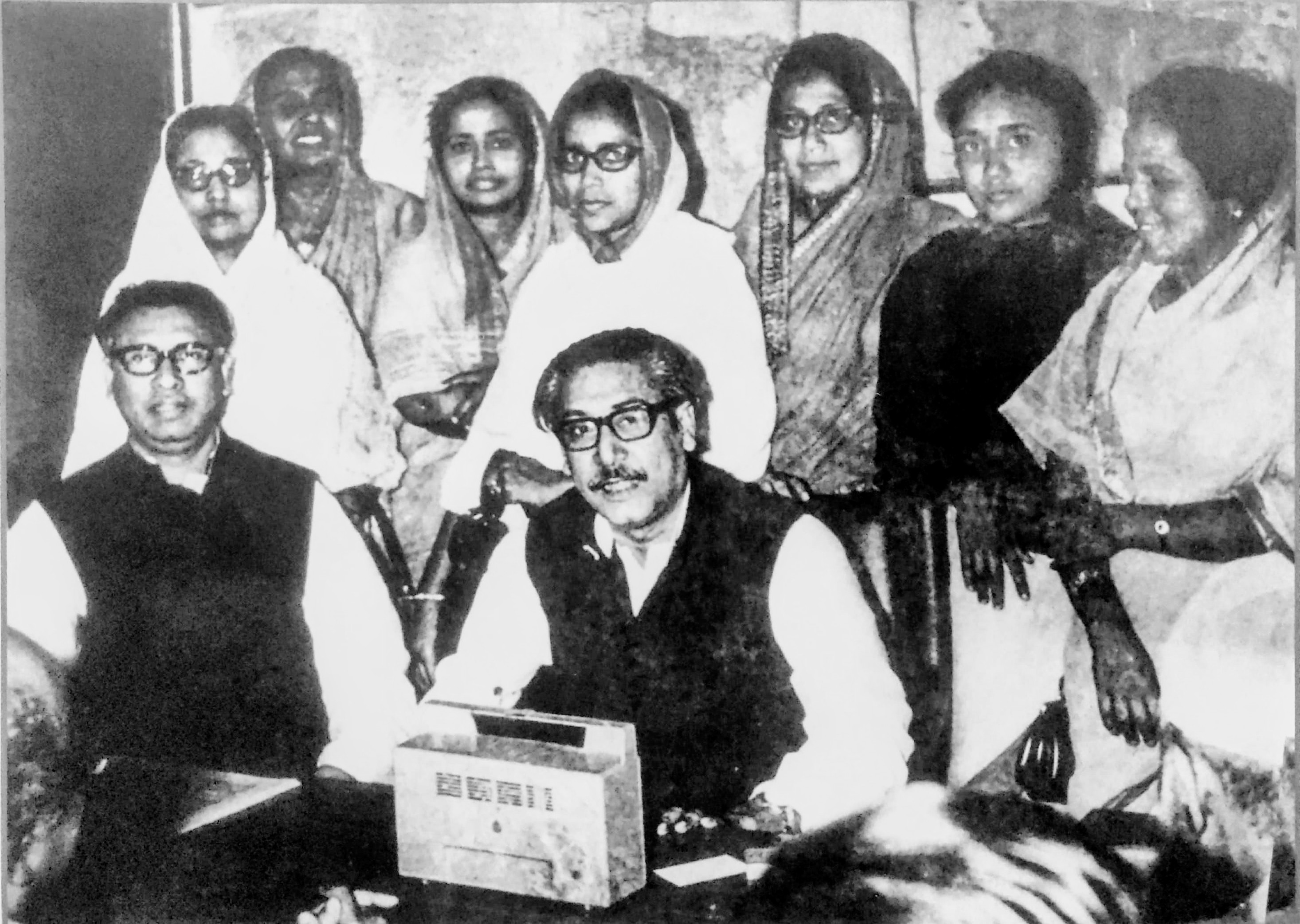
Sheikh Mujibur Rahman and leaders of Awami League listening to the 1970 election result.

The continuous public meetings of the Awami League in East Pakistan and the Pakistan Peoples Party in Western Pakistan attracted huge crowds. The Awami League, a Bengali nationalist party, mobilised support in East Pakistan on the basis of its Six-Points Program (SPP), which was the main attraction in the party's manifesto. In East Pakistan, a huge majority of the Bengali nation favoured the Awami League, under Sheikh Mujib. The party received a huge percentage of the popular vote in East Pakistan and emerged as the largest party in the nation as a whole, gaining the exclusive mandate of Pakistan in terms of both seats and votes.

The Pakistan Peoples Party failed to win any seats in the east. On the other hand, the Awami League failed to garner any seats in the west. The Awami League's failure to win any seats in the west was used by the leftists led by Zulfikar Bhutto, who argued that Mujib had received "no mandate or support from West Pakistan" (ignoring the fact that he himself did not win any seat in East Pakistan).

Bhutto uttered his infamous phrase "idhar hum, udhar tum" (We rule here, you rule there) – thus dividing Pakistan for the first time orally.

Some Bengalis sided with the Pakistan Peoples' Party and tacitly or openly supported Bhutto and the democratic socialists, such as Jalaludin Abdur Rahim, an influential Bengali in Pakistan and mentor of Bhutto who was later jailed by Bhutto. Jamat-e-Islami, while supporting allowing the Awami League to form a government, was also against the fragmentation of the country. Conversely, several prominent figures from West Pakistan supported allowing the Awami League to rule, including the poet Faiz Ahmad Faiz and rights activist Malik Ghulam Jilani, father of Asma Jahangir, G. M. Syed the founder of Sindhi nationalist party Jeay Sindh Qaumi Mahaz (JSQM), and Abul Ala Maududi, the leader of Jamat-e-Islami.

=== Elections in West Pakistan ===
However, the political position in West Pakistan was completely different from East Pakistan. In West Pakistan, the population was divided between different ideological forces. The right-wing parties, led by Abul Maududi, raised the religious slogans and initially campaigned on an Islamic platform, further promising to enforce Sharia laws in the country. Meanwhile, the founding party of Pakistan and the national conservative Muslim League, which was divided into three factions (QML, CML, MLC), campaigned on a nationalist platform, promising to initiate the Jinnah reforms as originally envisioned by Jinnah and others in the 1940s. The factions, however, criticised each other for disobeying the rules laid down by the country's founding father.

The political influence of Zulfikar Ali Bhutto in West Pakistan was marked by his dynamic leadership and populist socialist platform. Through his iconic slogan, "Roti Kapra Aur Makaan" ("Food, Clothing and Shelter"), and the formation of the Pakistan Peoples Party (PPP), he successfully united fragmented democratic-left elements and rallied working-class communities, students, and impoverished citizens. Offering a vision of social welfare and a hopeful future for families, Bhutto and his allies outperformed conservative and right-wing opponents, securing the majority of the popular vote in West Pakistan during the 1970 elections and establishing themselves as dominant figures in the region's political landscape.

=== Nominations ===
A total of 1,957 candidates filed nomination papers for the 300 National Assembly seats. After scrutiny and withdrawals, 1,579 eventually contested the elections. The Awami League ran 170 candidates, of whom 162 were for constituencies in East Pakistan. Jamaat-e-Islami had the second-highest number of candidates with 151. The Pakistan Peoples Party ran only 120 candidates, of whom 103 were from constituencies in Punjab and Sindh, and none in East Pakistan. The PML (Convention) ran 124 candidates, the PML (Council) 119, and the PML (Qayyum) 133.

All thirteen women's seats were uncontested.

== Results ==
Vote share of different parties in the election.
1. AL (39.2%)
2. PPP (18.6%)
3. JI (6.03%)
4. CML (5.96%)
5. PML(Qa) (4.47%)
6. JUI (3.98%)
7. JUP (3.94%)
8. CML (3.34%)
9. NAP(W) (2.43%)
10. PDP (2.24%)
11. IND (7.04%)
12. Other Parties (2.76%)
Seat share of different parties in the election.
1. AL 53.35 (51.9%)
2. PPP 27.48 (26.8%)
3. PML(Qa) 2.87 (2.79%)
4. CML 2.23 (2.17%)
5. JUI 2.23 (2.17%)
6. NAP(W) 2.23 (2.17%)
7. JUP 2.23 (2.17%)
8. JI 1.28 (1.25%)
9. CML 0.63 (0.61%)
10. PDP 0.32 (0.31%)
11. IND 5.11 (4.97%)
12. Other Parties 2.76 (2.69%)

The government claimed a high level of public participation and a voter turnout of almost 63%. The total number of registered voters in the country was 56,941,500 of which 31,211,220 were from East Pakistan and 25,730,280 were from West Pakistan.

Party	Votes	%	Seats		
Party	Votes	%	General	Women	Total
All-Pakistan Awami League	12,937,162	39.20	160	7	167
Pakistan Peoples Party	6,148,923	18.63	81	4	85
Jamaat-e-Islami	1,989,461	6.03	4	0	4
Council Muslim League	1,965,689	5.96	7	0	7
Pakistan Muslim League (Qayyum)	1,473,749	4.47	9	1	10
Jamiat Ulema-e-Islam	1,315,071	3.98	7	0	7
Markazi Jamiat Ulema-e-Pakistan	1,299,858	3.94	7	0	7
Convention Muslim League	1,102,815	3.34	2	0	2
National Awami Party (Wali)	801,355	2.43	6	1	7
Pakistan Democratic Party	737,958	2.24	1	0	1
Jamiat Ulema-e-Islam (Thanvi)	521,764	1.58	0	0	0
Other parties	387,919	1.18	0	0	0
Independents	2,322,341	7.04	16	0	16
Total	33,004,065	100.00	300	13	313
Registered voters/turnout	56,941,500	–			
Source: Nohlen et al., Bangladesh Documents

=== Elected members in eastern Pakistan ===
List of members in East Bengal:

Constituency	Party	Member
NE-1 (Rangpur-I)	Awami League	Mazahar Hossain
NE-2 (Rangpur-II)	Awami League	Md. Reazuddin Ahmed
NE-3 (Rangpur-III)	Awami League	Mohammad Sadakat Hossain
NE-4 (Rangpur-IV)	Awami League	Lutfor Rahman
NE-5 (Rangpur-V)	Awami League	Shah Abdul Hamid
NE-6 (Rangpur-VI)	Awami League	Mohammad Abu Solaiman Mondal
NE-7 (Rangpur-VII)	Awami League	Mohammad Azizur Rahman
NE-8 (Rangpur-VIII)	Awami League	Mohammad Nural Haq
NE-9 (Rangpur-IX)	Awami League	Abdul Awal
NE-10 (Rangpur-X)	Awami League	Matiur Rahman
NE-11 (Rangpur-XI)	Awami League	Abdur Rouf
NE-12 (Rangpur-XII)	Awami League	Afsar Ali Ahmed
NE-13 (Dinajpur-I)	Awami League	Musharraf Husayn Chowdhury
NE-14 (Dinajpur-II)	Awami League	Adv. Azizur Rahman
NE-15 (Dinajpur-III)	Awami League	Mohammad Moksed Ali
NE-16 (Dinajpur-IV)	Awami League	Muhammad Yusuf Ali
NE-17 (Dinajpur-V)	Awami League	Shah Mahatab Ahmad
NE-18 (Dinajpur-VI)	Awami League	Wakiluddin Mondal
NE-19 (Bogra-I)	Awami League	Mafiz Ali Chowdhury
NE-20 (Bogra-II)	Awami League	Mujibur Rahman Mondal
NE-21 (Bogra-III)	Awami League	Akbar Ali Khan Chowdhury
NE-22 (Bogra-IV)	Awami League	Mohammad Habibur Rahman
NE-23 (Bogra-V)	Awami League	Zahidur Rahman
NE-24 (Pabna-I)	Awami League	Motahar Hossain Talukdar
NE-25 (Pabna-II)	Awami League	Abdur Rashid Tarkabagish
NE-26 (Pabna-III)	Awami League	Abdul Momin Talukdar
NE-27 (Pabna-IV)	Awami League	Syed Hossain Mansur
NE-28 (Pabna-V)	Awami League	Abu Sayeed
NE-29 (Pabna-VI)	Awami League	Amjad Hossain
NE-30 (Rajshahi-I)	Awami League	Atowar Rahman Talukder
NE-31 (Rajshahi-II)	Awami League	Azizar Rahman
NE-32 (Rajshahi-III)	Awami League	Mohammad Baitullah
NE-33 (Rajshahi-IV)	Awami League	Khalid Ali Mia
NE-34 (Rajshahi-V)	Awami League	Rais Uddin Ahmad
NE-35 (Rajshahi-VI)	Awami League	Abul Hasnat Muhammad Qamaruzzaman
NE-36 (Rajshahi-VII)	Awami League	Shah Muhammad Zafarullah
NE-37 (Rajshahi-VIII)	Awami League	Nazmul Hoque Sarkar
NE-38 (Rajshahi-IX)	Awami League	Sheikh Mobarak Hossain
NE-39 (Kushtia-I)	Awami League	M Amir-ul Islam
NE-40 (Kushtia-II)	Awami League	Azizur Rahman Akkas
NE-41 (Kushtia-III)	Awami League	Mohammad Shahiduddin
NE-42 (Kushtia-IV)	Awami League	Abzalur Rashid
NE-43 (Jessore-I)	Awami League	Md. Kamruzzaman
NE-44 (Jessore-II)	Awami League	Iqbal Anwar Islam
NE-45 (Jessore-III)	Awami League	Masihur Rahman
NE-46 (Jessore-IV)	Awami League	Subodh Kumar Mitra
NE-47 (Jessore-V)	Awami League	Raushan Ali
NE-48 (Jessore-VI)	Awami League	Muhammad Sohrab Hossain
NE-49 (Jessore-VII)	Awami League	Khandaker Abdul Hafeez
NE-50 (Khulna-I)	Awami League	Abul Khayr Shiqdar
NE-51 (Khulna-II)	Awami League	Sheikh Abdul Aziz
NE-52 (Khulna-III)	Awami League	Lutfar Rahman
NE-53 (Khulna-IV)	Awami League	Muhammad Abdul Ghafur
NE-54 (Khulna-V)	Awami League	Mohammad Mohsin
NE-55 (Khulna-VI)	Awami League	Salahuddin Yusuf
NE-56 (Khulna-VII)	Awami League	Muhammad Abdul Ghaffar
NE-57 (Khulna-VIII)	Awami League	Syed Kamal Bakht
NE-58 (Bakerganj-I)	Awami League	Abdur Rab Serniabat
NE-59 (Bakerganj-II)	Awami League	Salehuddin Ahmed
NE-60 (Bakerganj-III)	Awami League	Nurul Islam Manzur
NE-61 (Bakerganj-IV)	Awami League	Mohammad Abdul Barek
NE-62 (Bakerganj-V)	Awami League	Abdul Mannan Howlader
NE-63 (Bakerganj-VI)	Awami League	Tofail Ahmed
NE-64 (Bakerganj-VII)	Awami League	Azahar Uddin Ahmed
NE-65 (Bakerganj-VIII)	Awami League	A K Faezul Huq
NE-66 (Bakerganj-IX)	Awami League	Enayet Hossain Khan
NE-67 (Bakerganj-cum-Patuakhali)	Awami League	Md. Shamsul Huq
NE-68 (Patuakhali-I)	Awami League	Golam Ahad Chowdhury
NE-69 (Patuakhali-II)	Awami League	Abdul Hady Talukder
NE-70 (Patuakhali-III)	Awami League	Asmat Ali Sikder
NE-71 (Tangail-I)	Awami League	Abdul Mannan
NE-72 (Tangail-II)	Awami League	Shaukat Ali Khan
NE-73 (Tangail-III)	Awami League	Humayun Khalid
NE-74 (Tangail-IV)	Awami League	Hatem Ali Talukdar
NE-75 (Tangail-V)	Awami League	Shamsur Rahman Khan Shahjahan
NE-76 (Mymensingh-I)	Awami League	Mohammad Abdus Samad
NE-77 (Mymensingh-II)	Awami League	Karimuzzaman Talukder
NE-78 (Mymensingh-III)	Awami League	Mohammad Abdul Hakim
NE-79 (Mymensingh-IV)	Awami League	Anisur Rahman
NE-80 (Mymensingh-V)	Awami League	Abdul Hakim Sarkar
NE-81 (Mymensingh-VI)	Awami League	Musharraf Husayn Akhand
NE-82 (Mymensingh-VII)	Awami League	Ibrahim Sarkar
NE-83 (Mymensingh-VIII)	Pakistan Democratic Party	Nurul Amin
NE-84 (Mymensingh-IX)	Awami League	Syed Abdus Sultan
NE-85 (Mymensingh-X)	Awami League	ANM Nazrul Islam
NE-86 (Mymensingh-XI)	Awami League	Mohammad Shamsul Huda
NE-87 (Mymensingh-XII)	Awami League	Sadir Uddin Ahmed
NE-88 (Mymensingh-XIII)	Awami League	Abdul Momin Taluqdar
NE-89 (Mymensingh-XIV)	Awami League	Zubed Ali
NE-90 (Mymensingh-XV)	Awami League	Asaduzzaman Khan
NE-91 (Mymensingh-XVI)	Awami League	Zillur Rahman
NE-92 (Mymensingh-XVII)	Awami League	Syed Nazrul Islam
NE-93 (Mymensingh-XVIII)	Awami League	Mohammad Abdul Hamid
NE-94 (Faridpur-I)	Awami League	A.B.M. Nurul Islam
NE-95 (Faridpur-II)	Awami League	Syed Qumrul Islam Saleh Uddin
NE-96 (Faridpur-III)	Awami League	KM Obaidur Rahman
NE-97 (Faridpur-IV)	Awami League	Shamsuddin Mollah
NE-98 (Faridpur-V)	Awami League	Mohammad Abul Khayer
NE-99 (Faridpur-VI)	Awami League	Mollah Jalaluddin Ahmed
NE-100 (Faridpur-VII)	Awami League	Adeluddin Ahmad
NE-101 (Faridpur-VIII)	Awami League	Amjad Husayn Khan
NE-102 (Faridpur-IX)	Awami League	Abidur Reza Khan
NE-103 (Faridpur-X)	Awami League	M. A. Kasem
NE-104 (Dacca-I)	Awami League	Mohammed Nurul Islam
NE-105 (Dacca-II)	Awami League	Moslem Uddin Khan
NE-106 (Dacca-III)	Awami League	Khandaker Nurul Islam
NE-107 (Dacca-IV)	Awami League	Shamsul Haq
NE-108 (Dacca-V)	Awami League	Tajuddin Ahmad
NE-109 (Dacca-VI)	Awami League	Ashraf Ali Chowdhury
NE-110 (Dacca-VII)	Awami League	Zahir Uddin
NE-111 (Dacca-VIII)	Awami League	Sheikh Mujibur Rahman
NE-112 (Dacca-IX)	Awami League	Kamal Hossain
NE-113 (Dacca-X)	Awami League	Fazlur Rahman Bhuiyan
NE-114 (Dacca-XI)	Awami League	Aftab Uddin Bhuiyan
NE-115 (Dacca-XII)	Awami League	Abdur Razzaq Bhuiyan
NE-116 (Dacca-XIII)	Awami League	Shahar Ali Mia
NE-117 (Dacca-XIV)	Awami League	AKM Samsuzzoha
NE-118 (Dacca-XV)	Awami League	Kafiluddin Chowdhury
NE-119 (Dacca-XVI)	Awami League	Abdul Karim Bepari
NE-120 (Sylhet-I)	Awami League	Mostafa Ali
NE-121 (Sylhet-II)	Awami League	Mohammad Abdur Rab
NE-122 (Sylhet-III)	Awami League	Latifur Rahman Chowdhury
NE-123 (Sylhet-IV)	Awami League	Mohammad Elias
NE-124 (Sylhet-V)	Awami League	Abdul Muntaquim Chaudhury
NE-125 (Sylhet-VI)	Awami League	M. A. G. Osmani
NE-126 (Sylhet-VII)	Awami League	Abdur Rahim
NE-127 (Sylhet-VIII)	Awami League	Dewan Farid Gazi
NE-128 (Sylhet-IX)	Awami League	Abdul Hoque
NE-129 (Sylhet-X)	Awami League	Abdus Samad Azad
NE-130 (Sylhet-XI)	Awami League	D. M. H Obaidur Raza Chowdhury
NE-131 (Comilla-I)	Awami League	Taheruddin Thakur
NE-132 (Comilla-II)	Awami League	Ali Azam
NE-133 (Comilla-III)	Awami League	Dewan Abul Abbas
NE-134 (Comilla-IV)	Awami League	Serajul Huq
NE-135 (Comilla-V)	Awami League	Khurshed Alam
NE-136 (Comilla-VI)	Awami League	Kazi Zahirul Qayyum
NE-137 (Comilla-VII)	Awami League	Ahmad Khaliq
NE-138 (Comilla-VIII)	Awami League	Khondaker Mostaq Ahmad
NE-139 (Comilla-IX)	Awami League	Md Abul Hashem
NE-140 (Comilla-X)	Awami League	Muhammad Shujat Ali
NE-141 (Comilla-XI)	Awami League	Abdul Awal
NE-142 (Comilla-XII)	Awami League	Hafez Habibur Rahman
NE-143 (Comilla-XIII)	Awami League	Muhammad Waliullah
NE-144 (Comilla-XIV)	Awami League	Mizanur Rahman Chowdhury
NE-145 (Noakhali-I)	Awami League	Obaidullah Majumdar
NE-146 (Noakhali-II)	Awami League	Khawaja Ahmed
NE-147 (Noakhali-III)	Awami League	Nurul Haque
NE-148 (Noakhali-IV)	Awami League	Abdul Malek Ukil
NE-149 (Noakhali-V)	Awami League	Delwar Hussain
NE-150 (Noakhali-VI)	Awami League	Khalid Muhammad Ali
NE-151 (Noakhali-VII)	Awami League	Md. Hanif
NE-152 (Noakhali-VIII)	Awami League	Abdur Rashid
NE-153 (Chittagong-I)	Awami League	Mustafizur Rahman Siddiqi
NE-154 (Chittagong-II)	Awami League	Muhammad Abdul Majid
NE-155 (Chittagong-III)	Awami League	Mohammad Idris
NE-156 (Chittagong-IV)	Awami League	Syed Fazlul Haq
NE-157 (Chittagong-V)	Awami League	Mohammad Khaled
NE-158 (Chittagong-VI)	Awami League	Nurul Islam Chowdhury
NE-159 (Chittagong-VII)	Awami League	Ataur Rahman Khan Kaiser
NE-160 (Chittagong-VIII)	Awami League	Abu Saleh Mia
NE-161 (Chittagong-IX)	Awami League	Nur Ahmad Sawdagar
NE-162 (Hill Tracts)	Independent	Tridev Roy

=== Elected members in western Pakistan ===
List of members from Punjab, Sindh, North West Frontier Province, Federally Administered Tribal Areas, and Balochistan:

Constituency	Party	Member
NW-1 Peshawar-I	Pakistan Muslim League (Qayyum)	Abdul Qayyum Khan (vacated); Yusuf Khattak (by-election)
NW-2 Peshawar-II	National Awami Party (Wali)	Ghulam Faruque Khan
NW-3 Peshawar-III	National Awami Party (Wali)	Abdul Wali Khan
NW-4 Peshawar-IV	Jamiat Ulema-e-Islam	Abdul Haq Akorwi
NW-5 Hazara-I	Jamiat Ulema-e-Islam	Abdul Hakeem
NW-6 Hazara-II	Jamiat Ulema-e-Islam	Ghulam Ghaus Hazarvi
NW-7 Hazara-III	Pakistan Muslim League (Qayyum)	Sardar Inayatur Rehman Khan Abbasi
NW-8 Hazara-IV	Pakistan Muslim League (Qayyum)	Abdul Qayyum Khan
NW-9 Mardan-I	Pakistan People's Party	Abdul Khaliq Khan
NW-10 Mardan-II	National Awami Party (Wali)	Ameerzada Khan (vacated)
NW-10 Mardan-II		Umra Khan (by election)
NW-11 (Mardan cum Hazara)	Pakistan Muslim League (Qayyum)	Abdul Qayyum Khan (vacated)
NW-11 (Mardan cum Hazara)		Muhammad Hanif Khan (by election)
NW-12 (Kohat)	Jamiat Ulema-e-Islam	Moulvi Naimatullah
NW-13 (Dera Ismail Khan)	Jamiat Ulema-e-Islam	Mufti Mehmood
NW-14 (Bannu)	Jamiat Ulema-e-Islam	Moulana Sadar us Shahid
NW-15 (Chitral cum Dir)	Pakistan Muslim League (Qayyum)	Jafar Ali Shah
NW-16 (Swat-I)	Pakistan Muslim League (Qayyum)	Rahim Shah
NW-17 (Swat-II)	Pakistan Muslim League (Qayyum)	Miangul Aurangzeb
NW-18 (Dir)	Jamaat-e-Islami	Sahibzada Saifullah
NW-19 (Tribal Area-I)	Independent	Akbar Khan Mohmand
NW-20 (Tribal Area-II)	Independent	Haji Saleh Khan
NW-21 (Tribal Area-III)	Independent	Naimatullah Khan Shinwari (vacated); Haji Gul Muhammad (by election)
NW-22 (Tribal Area-IV)	Independent	Malik Jahangir Khan
NW-23 (Tribal Area-V)	Independent	Abdul Malik
NW-24 (Tribal Area-VI)	Independent	Jamal Dar
NW-25 (Tribal Area-VII)	Independent	Abdul Subhan Khan
NW-26 (Rawalpindi-I)	Pakistan People's Party	Khurshid Hassan Mir
NW-27 (Rawalpindi-II)	Pakistan People's Party	Malik Muhammad Jaffar
NW-28 (Rawalpindi-III)	Pakistan People's Party	Habib Ahmed
NW-29 (Rawalpindi-IV)	Pakistan People's Party	Raja Abdul Aziz Bhatti
NW-30 (Campbellpur-I)	Council Muslim League	Shaukat Hayat Khan
NW-31 (Campbellpur-II)	Council Muslim League	Pir Syed Saifuddin
NW-32 (Jhelum-I)	Pakistan People's Party	Dr. Ghulam Hussain
NW-33 (Jhelum-II)	Pakistan People's Party	Muhammad Amir Khan
NW-34 (Jhelum-III)	Pakistan People's Party	Malik Muhammad Sadiq
NW-35 (Gujrat-I)	Council Muslim League	Chaudhry Zahoor Elahi
NW-36 (Gujrat-II)	Pakistan People's Party	Fazal Ilahi Chaudhry (vacated)
NW-36 (Gujrat-II)		Muhammad Sardar Khan (by election)
NW-37 (Gujrat-III)	Pakistan People's Party	Chaudhary Manzoor Hussain Daudra
NW-38 (Gujrat-IV)	Pakistan People's Party	Chaudhary Ghulam Rasool Tarar
NW-39 (Sargodha-I)		Chaudhary Jahangir Ali
NW-40 (Sargodha-II)	Pakistan People's Party	Anwar Ali Noon
NW-41 (Sargodha-III)	Pakistan People's Party	Hafeezullah Cheema
NW-42 (Sargodha-IV)	Council Muslim League	Malik Karam Bakhsh Awan
NW-43 (Sargodha-V)	Council Muslim League	Nawabzada Mian Muhammad Zakir
NW-44 (Mianwali-I)	Independent	Nawabzada Malik Muzaffar Khan
NW-45 (Mianwali-II)	Council Muslim League	Ghulam Hassan Khan Dhandala
NW-46 (Jhang-I)	Markazi Jamiat Ulema-e-Pakistan	Mehar Ghulam Haider Bharwana
NW-47 (Jhang-II)	Markazi Jamiat Ulema-e-Pakistan	Moulana Muhammad Zakir (d. 1975)
NW-47 (Jhang-II)	Pakistan People's Party	Sardarzada Muhammad Ali Shah (by election)
NW-48 (Jhang-III)	Markazi Jamiat Ulema-e-Pakistan	Sahibzada Nazir Sultan
NW-49 (Lyallpur-I)	Pakistan People's Party	Mukhtar Rana (disqualified)
NW-49 (Lyallpur-I)		Muhammad Afzal Randhawa (by election)
NW-50 (Lyallpur-II)	Pakistan People's Party	Mian Muhammad Attaullah
NW-51 (Lyallpur-III)	Pakistan People's Party	Ahsanul Haq
NW-52 (Lyallpur-IV)	Pakistan People's Party	Muhammad Bashir Ahmed
NW-53 (Lyallpur-V)	Pakistan People's Party	Chaudhary Muhammad Aslam (d. 1975)
NW-53 (Lyallpur-V)		Raja Mubaraz Khan (by election)
NW-54 (Lyallpur-VI)	Pakistan People's Party	Rai Hafeezullah Khan
NW-55 (Lyallpur-VII)	Pakistan People's Party	Chaudhary Muhammad Anwar Ali Khan
NW-56 (Lyallpur-VIII)	Pakistan People's Party	Ghulam Nabi Chaudhary
NW-57 (Lyallpur-IX)	Pakistan People's Party	Muhammad Khan Chaudhary
NW-58 (Lahore-I)	Pakistan People's Party	Malik Muhammad Akhtar
NW-59 (Lahore-II)	Pakistan People's Party	Mubashir Hassan
NW-60 (Lahore-III)	Pakistan People's Party	Zulfikar Ali Bhutto (vacated); Mahmud Ali Kasuri (by election)
NW-61 (Lahore-IV)	Pakistan People's Party	Sheikh Rasheed Ahmed
NW-62 (Lahore-V)	Pakistan People's Party	Malik Meraj Khalid
NW-63 (Lahore-VI)	Pakistan People's Party	Ahmad Raza Khan Kasuri
NW-64 (Lahore-VII)	Pakistan People's Party	Chaudhary Shafaat Khan Chohan
NW-65 (Lahore-VIII)	Pakistan People's Party	Syed Mehmood Abbas Bukhari
NW-66 (Sheikhupura-I)	Pakistan People's Party	Chaudhry Mumtaz Ahmed
NW-67 (Sheikhupura-II)	Pakistan People's Party	Mian Hamid Yaseen
NW-68 (Sheikhupura-III)	Pakistan People's Party	Chaudhary Muhammad Iqbal (d. 1974)
NW-68 (Sheikhupura-III)		Nisar Ahmed (by election)
NW-69 (Sheikhupura-IV)	Pakistan People's Party	Rai Shahadat Ali Khan
NW-70 (Gujranwala-I)	Pakistan People's Party	Mian Manzoor-e-Hassan (d. 1974); Habibur Rahman (by election)
NW-71 (Gujranwala-II)	Pakistan People's Party	Zulfiqar Ali Bajwa (died)
NW-71 (Gujranwala-II)		Ali Muhammad Darriwal (by election)
NW-72 (Gujranwala-III)	Pakistan People's Party	Ghulam Haider Cheema
NW-73 (Gujranwala-IV)	Pakistan People's Party	Mian Shahadat Khan
NW-74 (Sialkot-I)	Pakistan People's Party	Mian Masood Ahmed
NW-75 (Sialkot-II)	Pakistan People's Party	Kausar Niazi
NW-76 (Sialkot-III)	Pakistan People's Party	Chaudhary Nasrullah Khan (vacated)
NW-76 (Sialkot-III)	Council Muslim League	Abdul Wahid (by election)
NW-77 (Sialkot-IV)	Pakistan People's Party	Malik Muhammad Suleman
NW-78 (Sialkot-V)	Pakistan People's Party	Chaudhary Sultan Ahmed Cheema
NW-79 (Multan-I)	Pakistan People's Party	Zulfikar Ali Bhutto (vacated); Sahibzada Farooq Ali (by election)
NW-80 (Multan-II)	Pakistan People's Party	Sadiq Hussain Qureshi (vacated)
NW-80 (Multan-II)		Sajid Pervez Mian (by election)
NW-81 (Multan-III)	Pakistan People's Party	Sayyid Abbas Hussain Gardezi
NW-82 (Multan-IV)	Independent	Zafarullah Khan Chaudhary
NW-83 (Multan-V)	Pakistan People's Party	Chaudhary Barkatullah
NW-84 (Multan-VI)	Council Muslim League	Mumtaz Daultana (vacated)
NW-84 (Multan-VI)		Mian Riaz Ahmed Khan (by election)
NW-85 (Multan-VII)	Pakistan People's Party	Khan Irshad Ahmed Khan
NW-86 (Multan-VIII)	Pakistan People's Party	Syed Nasir Ali Rizvi
NW-87 (Multan-IX)	Pakistan People's Party	Rana Taj Ahmed Noon
NW-88 (Dera Ghazi Khan-I)	Jamaat-e-Islami	Nazir Ahmed (died)
NW-88 (Dera Ghazi Khan-I)		Khawaja Ghulam Suleman (by election)
NW-89 (Dera Ghazi Khan-II)	Independent	Sherbaz Khan Mazari
NW-90 (Muzaffargarh-I)	Pakistan People's Party	Mahar Manzoor Hussain Sumra
NW-91 (Muzaffargarh-II)	Pakistan People's Party	Ghulam Mustafa Khar (vacated)
NW-91 (Muzaffargarh-II)		Mian Ghulam Abbas (by election)
NW-92 (Muzaffargarh-III)	Markazi Jamiat Ulema-e-Pakistan	Mian Muhammad Ibrahim Barq
NW-93 (Sahiwal-I)	Pakistan People's Party	Sardar Abdul Aleem
NW-94 (Sahiwal-II)	Pakistan People's Party	Chaudhary Muhammad Hanif Khan
NW-95 (Sahiwal-III)	Pakistan People's Party	Haji Muhammad Sadiq
NW-96 (Sahiwal-IV)	Pakistan People's Party	Rao Khurshid Ali Khan
NW-97 (Sahiwal-V)	Pakistan People's Party	Mian Muhammad Hassan Khan
NW-98 (Sahiwal-VI)	Pakistan People's Party	Rao Hashim Khan
NW-99 (Sahiwal-VII)	Pakistan People's Party	Noor Muhammad
NW-100 (Bahawalpur-I)	Council Muslim League	Nizamuddin Haider
NW-101 (Bahawalpur-II)	Independent	Saeed-ur-Rashid Abbasi
NW-102 (Bahawalnagar cum Bahawalpur)	Pakistan People's Party	Muhammad Shafi
NW-103 (Bahawalnagar-I)	Pakistan Muslim League (Qayyum)	Syed Rafiq Muhammad Shah
NW-104 (Bahawalnagar-II)	Pakistan People's Party	Mian Muhammad Rafiq
NW-105 (Rahim Yar Khan-I)	Convention Muslim League	Khawaja Jamal Muhammad Koreja
NW-106 (Rahim Yar Khan-II)	Pakistan People's Party	Abdul Nabi Khan Kanju
NW-107 (Rahim Yar Khan-III)	Independent	Makhdoom Noor Muhammad
NW-108 (Jacobabad)	Pakistan People's Party	Mir Dariya Khan Khoso
NW-109 (Sukkur-I)	Independent	Moula Bakhsh Soomro
NW-110 (Sukkur-II)	Independent	Ali Hassan Mangi
NW-111 (Sukkur-III)	Pakistan People's Party	Noor Muhammad Khan Lund
NW-112 (Nawabshah-I)	Pakistan People's Party	Hakim Ali Zardari
NW-113 (Nawabshah-II)	Pakistan People's Party	Ghulam Mustafa Jatoi (vacated); Ghulam Mujtaba Jatoi (by election)
NW-114 (Khairpur-I)	Pakistan People's Party	Syed Qaim Ali Shah
NW-115 (Khairpur-II)	Pakistan People's Party	Pir Syed Abdul Qadir Shah Jillani
NW-116 (Larkana-I)	Pakistan People's Party	Zulfikar Ali Bhutto
NW-117 (Larkana-II)	Pakistan People's Party	Mumtaz Bhutto
NW-118 (Hyderabad-I)	Markazi Jamiat Ulema-e-Pakistan	Syed Muhammad Ali Rizvi
NW-119 (Hyderabad-II)	Pakistan People's Party	Mir Aijaz Ali Talpur
NW-120 (Hyderabad-III)	Pakistan People's Party	Makhdoom Muhammad Zaman Talibul Moula
NW-121 (Hyderabad-IV)	Pakistan People's Party	Zulfikar Ali Bhutto (vacated); Haji Ali Ahmed Khan (by election)
NW-122 (Tharparkar-I)	Pakistan People's Party	Mir Ali Bakhsh Khan Talpur
NW-123 (Tharparkar-II)	Pakistan People's Party	Pir Ghulam Rasool Shah Jillani
NW-124 (Dadu-I)	Pakistan People's Party	Abdul Hameed Jatoi
NW-125 (Dadu-II)	Pakistan People's Party	Malik Sikandar Khan
NW-126 (Sanghar)	Pakistan Muslim League (Qayyum)	Atta Muhammad Marri
NW-127 (Thatta)	Pakistan People's Party	Zulfikar Ali Bhutto (vacated); Ameen Faheem (by election)
NW-128 (Karachi-I)	Markazi Jamiat Ulema-e-Pakistan	Abdul Mustafa Al-Azhari
NW-129 (Karachi-II)	Pakistan People's Party	Abdul Hafeez Pirzada
NW-130 (Karachi-III)	Pakistan People's Party	Abdul Sattar Gabol
NW-131 (Karachi-IV)	Jamaat-e-Islami	Mehmood Azam Farooqi
NW-132 (Karachi-V)	Jamaat-e-Islami	Abdul Ghafoor Ahmed
NW-133 (Karachi-VI)	Independent	Zafar Ahmed Ansari
NW-134 (Karachi-VII)	Markazi Jamiat Ulema-e-Pakistan	Shah Ahmad Noorani (vacated)
NW-134 (Karachi-VII)	Pakistan People's Party	Noorul Arfin (by election)
NW-135 (Quetta-I)	Jamiat Ulema-e-Islam	Maulvi Abdul Haq
NW-136 (Quetta-II)	National Awami Party (Wali)	Khair Bakhsh Marri (vacated)
NW-136 (Quetta-II)	Council Muslim League	Taj Muhammad Jamali (by-election)
NW-137 (Kalat-I)	National Awami Party (Wali)	Abdul Hai Baloch
NW-138 (Kalat-II)	National Awami Party (Wali)	Ghaus Bakhsh Bizenjo

== Aftermath ==
The elected Assembly initially did not meet, as President Yahya Khan and the Pakistan Peoples Party did not want the majority party from East Pakistan forming government. This caused great unrest in East Pakistan. The military junta responded by executing Operation Searchlight, which led to the Bangladesh War of Independence, with East Pakistan becoming the independent state of Bangladesh. The Assembly session was eventually held when Yahya resigned four days after Pakistan surrendered to Bangladesh and Zulfikar Ali Bhutto took over. Bhutto became the Prime Minister of Pakistan in 1973, after the post was recreated by the new constitution.
