= List of members of the 5th National Assembly of Pakistan =

5th National Assembly
←	4th National Assembly	6th National Assembly	→
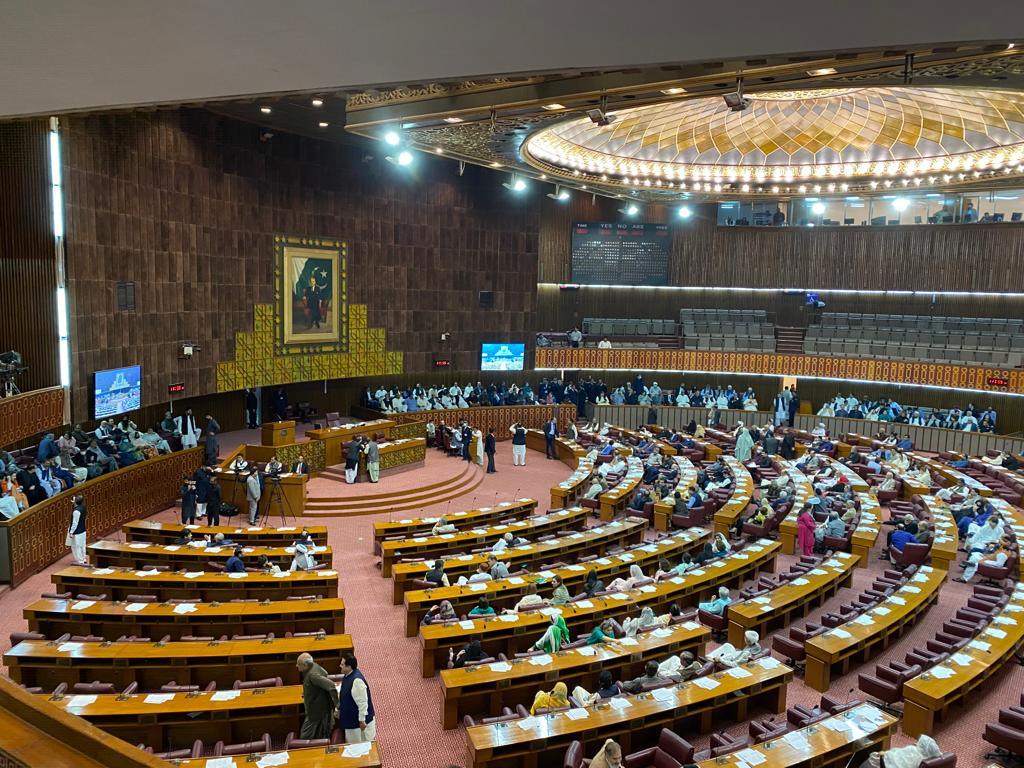

Overview
- Legislative body: National Assembly of Pakistan
- Jurisdiction: Pakistan
- Meeting place: Parliament House, Islamabad-44030
- Term: 1972 – 1977
- Election: 1970 Pakistani general election
- Government: Government of Pakistan
- Website: Official website

National Assembly of Pakistan
- Members: 313
- Speaker: Zulfikar Ali Bhutto (1972); Fazal Ilahi Chaudhry (1972–1973); Farooq Ali (1973–1977)
- Prime Minister: Nurul Amin (1971); Zulfikar Ali Bhutto (1973–1977)
- President: Zulfikar Ali Bhutto (1971–1973); Fazal Ilahi Chaudhry (from 1973)

5th National Assembly of Pakistan (1972–77)
Party	Seats		
Party	General	Women	Total
PPP	81	5	86
QML	9	0	9
ML(Council)	7	0	7
JUI	7	0	7
JUP	7	0	7
NAP-W	6	1	7
JI	4	0	4
CML	2	0	2
IND	15	0	15
Total	138	6	144

The 5th Parliament of Pakistan was the unicameral legislature of Pakistan formed after the 1970 General Elections. There were 313 seats of Parliament.

Due to war of 1971, East Pakistan separated and became Bangladesh. Only Tridev Roy and Nurul Amin remained in Pakistan.

== Elected members ==
List of members from Punjab, Sindh, North West Frontier Province, Federally Administered Tribal Areas, and Balochistan:

Province	District	Constituency	Party	Member
North West Frontier Province	Peshawar	NW-1 Peshawar-I	Pakistan Muslim League (Qayyum)	Yusuf Khattak
North West Frontier Province	Peshawar	NW-2 Peshawar-II	National Awami Party	Ghulam Faruque Khan
North West Frontier Province	Peshawar	NW-3 Peshawar-III	National Awami Party Wali	Abdul Wali Khan
North West Frontier Province	Peshawar	NW-4 Peshawar-IV	Jamiat Ulema-e-Islam	Abdul Haq Akorwi
North West Frontier Province	Hazara	NW-5 Hazara-I	Jamiat Ulema-e-Islam	Abdul Hakeem
North West Frontier Province	Hazara	NW-6 Hazara-II	Jamiat Ulema-e-Islam	Ghulam Ghaus Hazarvi
North West Frontier Province	Hazara	NW-7 Hazara-III	Pakistan Muslim League (Qayyum)	Sardar Inayatur Rehman Khan Abbasi
North West Frontier Province	Hazara	NW-8 Hazara-IV	Pakistan Muslim League (Qayyum)	Abdul Qayyum Khan
North West Frontier Province	Mardan	NW-9 Mardan-I	Pakistan Muslim League (Qayyum)	Abdul Khaliq Khan
North West Frontier Province	Mardan	NW-10 Mardan-II	National Awami Party Wali	Umra Khan by election
North West Frontier Province	Mardan	NW-11 Mardan cum Hazara	Pakistan Muslim League (Qayyum)	Muhammad Hanif Khan
North West Frontier Province	Kohat	NW-12 Kohat	Jamiat Ulema-e-Islam	Moulvi Naimatullah
North West Frontier Province	Dera Ismail Khan	NW-13 Dera Ismail Khan	Jamiat Ulema-e-Islam	Mufti Mehmood
North West Frontier Province	Bannu	NW-14 Bannu	Jamiat Ulema-e-Islam	Moulana Sadar us Shahid
North West Frontier Province	Chitral Dir	NW-15 Chitral cum Dir	Pakistan Muslim League (Qayyum)	Jafar Ali Shah
North West Frontier Province	Swat	NW-16 Swat-I	Pakistan Muslim League (Qayyum)	Rahim Shah
North West Frontier Province	Swat	NW-17 Swat-II	Pakistan Muslim League (Qayyum)	Miangul Aurangzeb
North West Frontier Province	Dir	NW-18 Dir	Jamaat-e-Islami	Sahibzada Saifullah
FATA	Mohmand	NW-19 Tribal Area-I	Independent	Akbar Khan Mohmand
FATA	Khyber	NW-20 Tribal Area-II	Independent	Haji Saleh Khan
FATA	Orakzai Kurram	NW-21 Tribal Area-III	Independent	Haji Gul Muhammad
FATA	North Waziristan	NW-22 Tribal Area-IV	Independent	Malik Jahangir Khan
FATA	South Waziristan	NW-23 Tribal Area-V	Independent	Abdul Malik
FATA	Frontier regions	NW-24 Tribal Area-VI	Independent	Jamal Dar
FATA	Bajaur	NW-25 Tribal Area-VII	Independent	Abdul Subhan Khan
Punjab	Rawalpindi	NW-26 Rawalpindi-I	Pakistan People's Party	Khurshid Hassan Mir
Punjab	Rawalpindi	NW-27 Rawalpindi-II	Pakistan People's Party	Malik Muhammad Jaffar
Punjab	Rawalpindi	NW-28 Rawalpindi-III	Pakistan People's Party	Habib Ahmed
Punjab	Rawalpindi	NW-29 Rawalpindi-IV	Pakistan People's Party	Raja Abdul Aziz Bhatti
Punjab	Campbellpur	NW-30 Campbellpur-I	Council Muslim League	Shaukat Hayat Khan
Punjab	Campbellpur	NW-31 Campbellpur-II	Council Muslim League	Pir Syed Saifuddin
Punjab	Jhelum	NW-32 Jhelum-I	Pakistan People's Party	Dr. Ghulam Hussain
Punjab	Jhelum	NW-33 Jhelum-II	Pakistan People's Party	Muhammad Amir Khan
Punjab	Jhelum	NW-34 Jhelum-III	Pakistan People's Party	Malik Muhammad Sadiq
Punjab	Gujrat	NW-35 Gujrat-I	Council Muslim League	Chaudhry Zahoor Elahi
Punjab	Gujrat	NW-36 Gujrat-II	Pakistan People's Party	Muhammad Sardar Khan
Punjab	Gujrat	NW-37 Gujrat-III	Pakistan People's Party	Chaudhary Manzoor Hussain Daudra
Punjab	Gujrat	NW-38 Gujrat-IV	Pakistan People's Party	Chaudhary Ghulam Rasool Tarar
Punjab	Sargodha	NW-39 Sargodha-I	Pakistan People's Party	Chaudhary Jahangir Ali
Punjab	Sargodha	NW-40 Sargodha-II	Pakistan People's Party	Anwar Ali Noon
Punjab	Sargodha	NW-41 Sargodha-III	Pakistan People's Party	Hafeezullah Cheema
Punjab	Sargodha	NW-42 Sargodha-IV	Council Muslim League	Malik Karam Bakhsh Awan
Punjab	Sargodha	NW-43 Sargodha-V	Council Muslim League	Nawabzada Mian Muhammad Zakir
Punjab	Mianwali	NW-44 Mianwali-I	Independent	Nawabzada Malik Muzaffar Khan
Punjab	Mianwali	NW-45 Mianwali-II	Council Muslim League	Ghulam Hassan Khan Dhandala
Punjab	Jhang	NW-46 Jhang-I	Markazi Jamiat Ulema-e-Pakistan	Mehar Ghulam Haider Bharwana
Punjab	Jhang	NW-47 Jhang-II	Pakistan People's Party	Sardarzada Muhammad Ali Shah
Punjab	Jhang	NW-48 Jhang-III	Markazi Jamiat Ulema-e-Pakistan	Sahibzada Nazir Sultan
Punjab	Lyallpur	NW-49 Lyallpur-I	Pakistan People's Party	Muhammad Afzal Randhawa
Punjab	Lyallpur	NW-50 Lyallpur-II	Pakistan People's Party	Mian Muhammad Attaullah
Punjab	Lyallpur	NW-51 Lyallpur-III	Pakistan People's Party	Ahsanul Haq
Punjab	Lyallpur	NW-52 Lyallpur-IV	Pakistan People's Party	Muhammad Bashir Ahmed
Punjab	Lyallpur	NW-53 Lyallpur-V	Pakistan People's Party	Raja Mubaraz Khan
Punjab	Lyallpur	NW-54 Lyallpur-VI	Pakistan People's Party	Rai Hafeezullah Khan
Punjab	Lyallpur	NW-55 Lyallpur-VII	Pakistan People's Party	Chaudhary Muhammad Anwar Ali Khan
Punjab	Lyallpur	NW-56 Lyallpur-VIII	Pakistan People's Party	Ghulam Nabi Chaudhary
Punjab	Lyallpur	NW-57 Lyallpur-IX	Pakistan People's Party	Muhammad Khan Chaudhary
Punjab	Lahore	NW-58 Lahore-I	Pakistan People's Party	Malik Muhammad Akhtar
Punjab	Lahore	NW-59 Lahore-II	Pakistan People's Party	Mubashir Hassan
Punjab	Lahore	NW-60 Lahore-III	Pakistan People's Party	Mahmud Ali Kasuri
Punjab	Lahore	NW-61 Lahore-IV	Pakistan People's Party	Sheikh Rasheed Ahmed
Punjab	Lahore	NW-62 Lahore-V	Pakistan People's Party	Malik Meraj Khalid
Punjab	Lahore	NW-63 Lahore-VI	Pakistan People's Party	Ahmad Raza Khan Kasuri
Punjab	Lahore	NW-64 Lahore-VII	Pakistan People's Party	Chaudhary Shafaat Khan Chohan
Punjab	Lahore	NW-65 Lahore-VIII	Pakistan People's Party	Syed Mehmood Abbas Bukhari
Punjab	Sheikhupura	NW-66 Sheikhupura-I	Pakistan People's Party	Chaudhry Mumtaz Ahmed
Punjab	Sheikhupura	NW-67 Sheikhupura-II	Pakistan People's Party	Mian Hamid Yaseen
Punjab	Sheikhupura	NW-68 Sheikhupura-III	Pakistan People's Party	Nisar Ahmed
Punjab	Sheikhupura	NW-69 Sheikhupura-IV	Pakistan People's Party	Rai Shahadat Ali Khan
Punjab	Gujranwala	NW-70 Gujranwala-I	Pakistan People's Party	Habibur Rahman
Punjab	Gujranwala	NW-71 Gujranwala-II	Pakistan People's Party	Ali Muhammad Darriwal
Punjab	Gujranwala	NW-72 Gujranwala-III	Pakistan People's Party	Ghulam Haider Cheema
Punjab	Gujranwala	NW-73 Gujranwala-IV	Pakistan People's Party	Mian Shahadat Khan
Punjab	Sialkot	NW-74 Sialkot-I	Pakistan People's Party	Mian Masood Ahmed
Punjab	Sialkot	NW-75 Sialkot-II	Pakistan People's Party	Kausar Niazi
Punjab	Sialkot	NW-76 Sialkot-III	Pakistan People's Party	Chaudhary Nasrullah Khan vacated
Punjab	Sialkot	NW-76 Sialkot-III	Council Muslim League	Abdul Wahid by election
Punjab	Sialkot	NW-77 Sialkot-IV	Pakistan People's Party	Malik Muhammad Suleman
Punjab	Sialkot	NW-78 Sialkot-V	Pakistan People's Party	Chaudhary Sultan Ahmed Cheema
Punjab	Multan	NW-79 Multan-I	Pakistan People's Party	Sahibzada Farooq Ali
Punjab	Multan	NW-80 Multan-II	Pakistan People's Party	Sajid Pervez Mian
Punjab	Multan	NW-81 Multan-III	Pakistan People's Party	Sayyid Abbas Hussain Gardezi
Punjab	Multan	NW-82 Multan-IV	Independent	Zafarullah Khan Chaudhary
Punjab	Multan	NW-83 Multan-V	Pakistan People's Party	Chaudhary Barkatullah
Punjab	Multan	NW-84 Multan-VI	Council Muslim League	Mian Riaz Ahmed Khan
Punjab	Multan	NW-85 Multan-VII	Pakistan People's Party	Khan Irshad Ahmed Khan
Punjab	Multan	NW-86 Multan-VIII	Pakistan People's Party	Syed Nasir Ali Rizvi
Punjab	Multan	NW-87 Multan-IX	Pakistan People's Party	Rana Taj Ahmed Noon
Punjab	Dera Ghazi Khan	NW-88 Dera Ghazi Khan-I	Jamaat-e-Islami	Khawaja Ghulam Suleman
Punjab	Dera Ghazi Khan	NW-89 Dera Ghazi Khan-II	Independent	Sherbaz Khan Mazari
Punjab	Muzaffargarh	NW-90 Muzaffargarh-I	Pakistan People's Party	Mahar Manzoor Hussain Sumra
Punjab	Muzaffargarh	NW-91 Muzaffargarh-II	Pakistan People's Party	Mian Ghulam Abbas
Punjab	Muzaffargarh	NW-92 Muzaffargarh-III	Markazi Jamiat Ulema-e-Pakistan	Mian Muhammad Ibrahim Barq
Punjab	Sahiwal	NW-93 Sahiwal-I	Pakistan People's Party	Sardar Abdul Aleem
Punjab	Sahiwal	NW-94 Sahiwal-II	Pakistan People's Party	Chaudhary Muhammad Hanif Khan
Punjab	Sahiwal	NW-95 Sahiwal-III	Pakistan People's Party	Haji Muhammad Sadiq
Punjab	Sahiwal	NW-96 Sahiwal-IV	Pakistan People's Party	Rao Khurshid Ali Khan
Punjab	Sahiwal	NW-97 Sahiwal-V	Pakistan People's Party	Mian Muhammad Hassan Khan
Punjab	Sahiwal	NW-98 Sahiwal-VI	Pakistan People's Party	Rao Hashim Khan
Punjab	Sahiwal	NW-99 Sahiwal-VII	Pakistan People's Party	Noor Muhammad
Punjab	Bahawalpur	NW-100 Bahawalpur-I	Council Muslim League	Nizamuddin Haider
Punjab	Bahawalpur	NW-101 Bahawalpur-II	Independent	Saeed-ur-Rashid Abbasi
Punjab	Bahawalpur	NW-102 Bahawalnagar cum Bahawalpur	Pakistan People's Party	Muhammad Shafi
Punjab	Bahawalnagar	NW-103 Bahawalnagar-I	Pakistan Muslim League (Qayyum)	Syed Rafiq Muhammad Shah
Punjab	Bahawalnagar	NW-104 Bahawalnagar-II	Pakistan People's Party	Mian Muhammad Rafiq
Punjab	Rahim Yar Khan	NW-105 Rahim Yar Khan-I	Convention Muslim League	Khawaja Jamal Muhammad Koreja
Punjab	Rahim Yar Khan	NW-106 Rahim Yar Khan-II	Pakistan People's Party	Abdul Nabi Khan Kanju
Punjab	Rahim Yar Khan	NW-107 Rahim Yar Khan-III	Independent	Makhdoom Noor Muhammad
Sindh	Jacobabad	NW-108 Jacobabad	Pakistan People's Party	Mir Dariya Khan Khoso
Sindh	Sukkur	NW-109 Sukkur-I	Independent	Moula Bakhsh Soomro
Sindh	Sukkur	NW-110 Sukkur-II	Independent	Ali Hassan Mangi
Sindh	Sukkur	NW-111 Sukkur-III	Pakistan People's Party	Noor Muhammad Khan Lund
Sindh	Nawabshah	NW-112 Nawabshah-I	Pakistan People's Party	Hakim Ali Zardari
Sindh	Nawabshah	NW-113 Nawabshah-II	Pakistan People's Party	Ghulam Mujtaba Jatoi
Sindh	Khairpur	NW-114 Khairpur-I	Pakistan People's Party	Syed Qaim Ali Shah
Sindh	Khairpur	NW-115 Khairpur-II	Pakistan People's Party	Pir Syed Abdul Qadir Shah Jillani
Sindh	Larkana	NW-116 Larkana-I	Pakistan People's Party	Zulfikar Ali Bhutto
Sindh	Larkana	NW-117 Larkana-II	Pakistan People's Party	Mumtaz Bhutto
Sindh	Hyderabad	NW-118 Hyderabad-I	Markazi Jamiat Ulema-e-Pakistan	Syed Muhammad Ali Rizvi
Sindh	Hyderabad	NW-119 Hyderabad-II	Pakistan People's Party	Mir Aijaz Ali Talpur
Sindh	Hyderabad	NW-120 Hyderabad-III	Pakistan People's Party	Makhdoom Muhammad Zaman Talibul Moula
Sindh	Hyderabad	NW-121 Hyderabad-IV	Pakistan People's Party	Haji Ali Ahmed Khan
Sindh	Tharparkar	NW-122 Tharparkar-I	Pakistan People's Party	Mir Ali Bakhsh Khan Talpur
Sindh	Tharparkar	NW-123 Tharparkar-II	Pakistan People's Party	Pir Ghulam Rasool Shah Jillani
Sindh	Dadu	NW-124 Dadu-I	Pakistan People's Party	Abdul Hameed Jatoi
Sindh	Dadu	NW-125 Dadu-II	Pakistan People's Party	Malik Sikandar Khan
Sindh	Sanghar	NW-126 Sanghar	Pakistan Muslim League (Qayyum)	Atta Muhammad Marri
Sindh	Thatta	NW-127 Thatta	Pakistan People's Party	Ameen Faheem
Sindh	Karachi	NW-128 Karachi-I	Markazi Jamiat Ulema-e-Pakistan	Abdul Mustafa Al-Azhari
Sindh	Karachi	NW-129 Karachi-II	Pakistan People's Party	Abdul Hafeez Pirzada
Sindh	Karachi	NW-130 Karachi-III	Pakistan People's Party	Abdul Sattar Gabol
Sindh	Karachi	NW-131 Karachi-IV	Jamaat-e-Islami	Mehmood Azam Farooqi
Sindh	Karachi	NW-132 Karachi-V	Jamaat-e-Islami	Abdul Ghafoor Ahmed
Sindh	Karachi	NW-133 Karachi-VI	Independent	Zafar Ahmed Ansari
Sindh	Karachi	NW-134 Karachi-VII	Pakistan People's Party	Noorul Arfin
Balochistan	Quetta	NW-135 Quetta-I	Jamiat Ulema-e-Islam	Abdul Haq Akorwi
Balochistan	Quetta	NW-136 Quetta-II	Council Muslim League	Taj Muhammad Jamali
Balochistan	Kalat	NW-137 Kalat-I	National Awami Party Wali	Abdul Hai Baloch
Balochistan	Kalat	NW-138 Kalat-II	National Awami Party Wali	Ghaus Bakhsh Bizenjo

== Elected members for Reserved Seats for Women ==
Province	Constituency	Party	Member
NWFP	NW-139 Women's Constituency-I	Pakistan Muslim League (Qayyum)	Shireen Wahab Sahiba
Punjab	NW-140 Women's Constituency-II	Pakistan People's Party	Nargis Naim Sendhu
Punjab	NW-141 Women's Constituency-III	Pakistan People's Party	Begum Nasim Jahan
Punjab	NW-142 Women's Constituency-IV	Pakistan People's Party	Begum Zahida Sultana
Sindh	NW-143 Women's Constituency-V	Pakistan People's Party	Mrs. Dr. Ashraf Abbas
Balochistan	NW-144 Women's Constituency-VI	National Awami Party Wali	Jennifer Jehanzeba Qazi Musa

== Membership changes ==
NW-1 Peshawar-I Abdul Qayyum Khan of PML(Qayyum) vacated and Yusuf Khattak of PML(Qayyum) elected in by-election.

NW-10 Mardan-II Ameerzada Khan of NAP(W) vacated and Umra Khan of NAP(W) elected in by-election.

NW-11 Mardan cum Hazara Abdul Qayyum Khan of PML(Qayyum) vacated and Muhammad Hanif Khan of PML(Qayyum) elected in by-election.

NW-21 Tribal Area-III Naimatullah Khan Shinwari (IND) vacated Haji Gul Muhammad (IND) elected in by election.

NW-36 Gujrat-II Fazal Ilahi Chaudhry of PPP vacated and Muhammad Sardar Khan of PPP elected in by-election.

NW-47 Jhang-II Moulana Muhammad Zakir of Markazi Jamiat Ulema-e-Pakistan died in 1975 and Sardarzada Muhammad Ali Shah of PPP elected in by-election.

NW-49 Lyallpur-I Mukhtar Rana of PPP disqualified and Muhammad Afzal Randhawa of PPP elected in by-election.

NW-53 Lyallpur-V Chaudhary Muhammad Aslam of PPP died in 1975 and Raja Mubaraz Khan of PPP elected in by-election.

NW-60 Lahore-III Zulfikar Ali Bhutto of PPP vacated and Mahmud Ali Kasuri of PPP elected in by election.

NW-68 Sheikhupura-III Chaudhary Muhammad Iqbal died in 1974 and Nisar Ahmed of PPP elected in by election.

NW-70 Gujranwala-I Mian Manzoor-e-Hassan died in 1974 and Habibur Rahman of PPP elected in by election.

NW-71 Gujranwala-II Zulfiqar Ali Bajwa died and Ali Muhammad Darriwal elected in by election.

NW-79 Multan-I Zulfikar Ali Bhutto of PPP vacated and Sahibzada Farooq Ali of PPP elected in by election.

NW-80 Multan-II Sadiq Hussain Qureshi of PPP vacated and Sajid Pervez Mian of PPP elected in by election.

NW-84 Multan-VI Mumtaz Daultana of CML vacated and Mian Riaz Ahmed Khan elected in by election.

NW-88 Dera Ghazi Khan-I Nazir Ahmed of JI died and Khawaja Ghulam Suleman elected in by election.

NW-91 Muzaffargarh-II Ghulam Mustafa Khar of PPP vacated and Mian Ghulam Abbas elected in by election.

NW-113 Nawabshah-II Ghulam Mustafa Jatoi of PPP vacated and Ghulam Mujtaba Jatoi of PPP by election.

NW-121 Hyderabad-IV Zulfikar Ali Bhutto of PPP vacated and Haji Ali Ahmed Khan of PPP elected in by election.

NW-127 Thatta Zulfikar Ali Bhutto of PPP vacated and Ameen Faheem of PPP elected in by election.

NW-134 Karachi-VII Shah Ahmad Noorani of Markazi Jamiat Ulema-e-Pakistan vacated and Noorul Arfin of PPP elected in by election.

NW-136 Quetta-II Khair Bakhsh Marri of NAP(W) vacated and Taj Muhammad Jamali of CML elected by-election.

== See also ==
- List of members of the Constituent Assembly of Bangladesh
