= Constituent Assembly of Bangladesh =

Provisional legislature of Bangladesh from 1971 to 1973

Constituent Assembly of Bangladesh বাংলাদেশ গণপরিষদ

Type
- Type: Unicameral

History
- Founded: 23 March 1972
- Disbanded: 15 December 1972
- Preceded by: Parliament of Pakistan; East Pakistan Provincial Assembly
- Succeeded by: Jatiya Sangsad
- Seats: 404

Meeting place
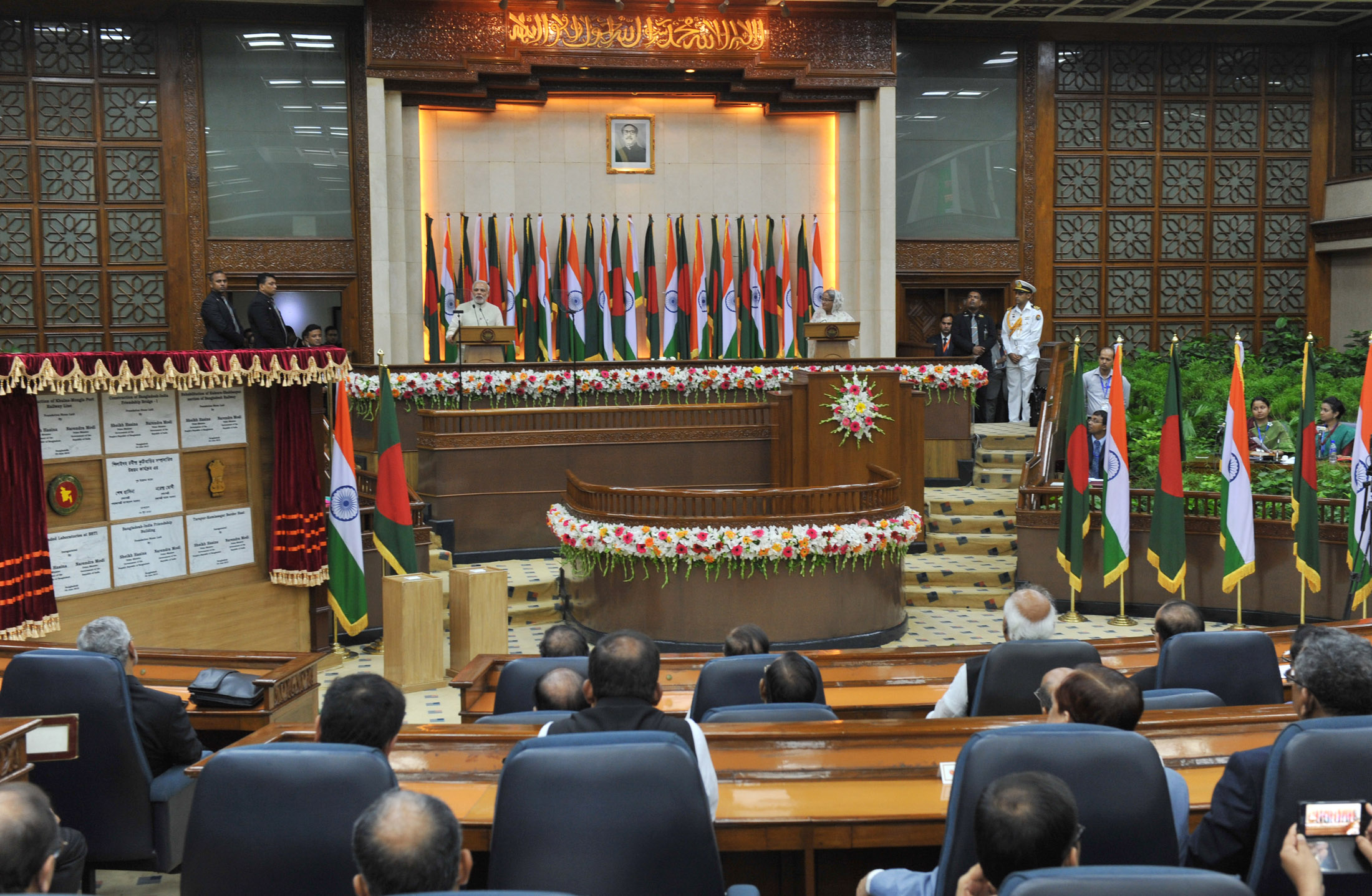
- Assembly House; Tejgaon, Dhaka, Bangladesh

The Constituent Assembly of Bangladesh was the first and, to date, the only constitution-making body of in the country. It was convened in 1972 by the government of Sheikh Mujibur Rahman following Bangladesh's independence. It comprised representatives elected in the national and provincial council elections of Pakistan held in 1970.

Since the assembly was formed with representatives elected under the Legal Framework Order, 1970, issued by Pakistan's then-military ruler and President Yahya Khan, several political parties and leaders, including Maulana Abdul Hamid Khan Bhashani, Badruddin Umar, A.S.M. Abdur Rab, Farhad Mazhar, and others, have labeled it as illegitimate. Despite the controversies and opposition, Sheikh Mujib's uncompromising leadership enabled the Constituent Assembly to draft and enact the Constitution in less than a year. However, from the time of its drafting until today, the constitution has been often labelled as "fascist" and criticized for fostering autocracy and failing to adequately safeguard human rights.

In the aftermath of the recent mass uprising, the interim government of Bangladesh is mulling over convening a new constituent assembly to draft a new inclusive democratic constitution, ensuring the inviolability of human dignity.

== Creation ==
Tensions between the Bengali Muslim population of East Bengal (renamed as East Pakistan in 1955) and the West Pakistan-based government had existed since the 1952 Bengali Language movement. The Yahya Khan led military government's inaction in providing relief to Bengali Muslims in the 1970 Bhola cyclone, laid bare claims of discrimination against Bengalis being perpetrated by the West Pakistani establishment. Nation-wide elections were held in 1970 by the military administration in an attempt to diffuse unrest within the country. 169 seats for the National Assembly of Pakistan from East Pakistan and 300 seats for the East Pakistan Provincial Assembly were being contested under the Constitution of 1962. The Awami League party ran on the platform of developing a new Pakistani constitution based on the 1966 Six Points. The Awami League won 167 out of 169 seats in the National Assembly and 288 out of 300 seats in the Provincial Assembly. Despite gaining the right to form a government, it was not allowed to take power by the military administration and the Zulfiqar Ali Bhutto led PPP (which had emerged as the largest party in West Pakistan). This denial in the transfer of power sparked the Bangladesh Liberation War.

During the war, elected representatives met in Mujibnagar on 17 April 1971. They signed the Proclamation of Bangladeshi Independence, which was declared as a provisional constitution. The elected representatives were transformed into a constituent assembly. After the war ended, the assembly convened in January 1972.

== Members ==
The Constituent Assembly was initially composed of all Members of the Pakistan National Assembly elected from East Pakistan in 1970 general elections, along with all members of the East Pakistan Provincial Assembly elected in the 1970 provincial elections, who had signed the declaration of independence. The initial count of members was 469. The Awami League had a supermajority with 167 MNAs and 298 MPAs. Other parties represented in the body were independents (1 MNA and 4 MPAs), Parbatya Chattagram Jana Samhati Samiti (2 MPAs) and National Awami Party (Wali) (1 MPA). East Pakistani legislators from the Pakistan Democratic Party (1 MNA and 2 MPAs), Jamaat-e-Islami Pakistan (1 MPA) and Nizam-e-Islam Party (1 MPA) refused to endorse the secession of East Pakistan. By the time the Constitution was promulgated, the tally had dropped to 404. 10 legislators had died, of whom 5 were killed by the Pakistani Army, 23 were disqualified or expelled from the Awami League; and 2 defected to Pakistan. Later the member numbers became 421.

All of the elected members were Bengali Muslims, except for 12, 10 (1 MNA and 9 MPAs) of whom were Bengali Hindus and the remaining 2 (MPAs of PCJSS) were Chakmas. It also had 17 (7 MNAs and 10 MPAs) female members, nominated by the Awami League.

Shah Abdul Hamid was elected as the assembly's speaker and Mohammad Mohammadullah as deputy speaker.

== Rules of Procedure ==
The Rules of Procedure was adopted in the first two-day plenary session.

== Drafting committee ==
The Constitution Drafting Committee was formed on 11 April 1972. It had 34 members with Kamal Hossain as chairman. Begum Razia Bano was its only female member. Barrister Amirul Islam and Advocate Suranjit Sengupta were among the prominent members on the committee. Sengupta, the lone NAP(W) member in the body, was a vocal member of the opposition bench.

Members of the committee are included below.

1. Kamal Hossain (MNA- Dhaka-9)
2. Md. Lutfor Rahman (MNA- Rangpur-4)
3. Abu Sayeed (MNA- Pabna-5)
4. M. Abdur Rahim (MPA-Dinajpur-7)
5. M Amir-ul Islam (MNA- Kushtia-1)
6. Mohammad Nurul Islam Manjur (MNA- Bakerganj-3)
7. Abdul Muntaquim Chaudhury (MNA- Sylhet-5)
8. Khitish Chandra Mondal (MPA-Bakerganj-15)
9. Suranjit Sengupta (MNA- Sylhet-2)
10. Syed Nazrul Islam (MNA- Mymensingh-17)
11. Tajuddin Ahmad (MNA- Dhaka-5)
12. Khandakar Mushtaq Ahmed (MNA- Cumilla -8)
13. AHM Qamaruzzaman (MNA- Rajshahi-6)
14. Abdul Momin Talukdar (MNA- Pabna-5)
15. Abdur Rouf (MNA- Rangpur-11)
16. Mohammad Baitullah (MNA- Rajshahi -3)
17. Barrister Badal Rashid (Bar-at-Law, P.A of Tajuddin Ahmad in Provisional Government of Bangladesh)
18. Khandaker Abdul Hafiz (MNA- Jessore 7)
19. Shaukat Ali Khan (MNA- Tangail-2)
20. Md Humayun Khalid
21. Asaduzzaman Khan (MPA- Jessore-10)
22. A. K. Mosharraf Hossain Akhand (MNA-Mymensingh-6)
23. Abdul Momin
24. Shamsuddin Molla (MNA-Faridpur-4)
25. Sheikh Abdur Rahman (MNA-Khulna-2)
26. Fakir Sahab Uddin Ahmed
27. Khurshed Alam (MNA-Cumilla-7)
28. Sirajul Haque (MNA-Cumilla-4)
29. Dewan Abul Abbas (MNA-Cumilla-5)
30. Abdur Rashid (MNA-Noakhali-)
31. Hafez Habibur Rahman (MNA-Cumilla-12)
32. Nurul Islam Chowdhury (MPA-Chattragram-6)
33. Muhammad Khaled (MPA-Chattragram—5)
34. Begum Razia Bano (MNA-women's seats)

== Citizenship debate ==
The minority Chakma lawmaker Manabendra Narayan Larma protested the use of the term "Bengali" to describe all Bangladeshi citizens. Larma said in his speech that "Under no definition or logic can a Chakma be a Bengali or a Bengali be a Chakma... As citizens of Bangladesh we are all Bangladeshis, but we also have a separate ethnic identity...".

== Article 70 ==
Under the interim constitution, law making powers resided with the executive branch. K. M. Obaidur Rahman, an Awami League lawmaker, raised a question as to why the constituent assembly was not given legislative powers. Subsequently, on the advice of the prime minister, President Abu Sayeed Chowdhury introduced the Bangladesh Constituent Assembly (Cessation of Membership) Order 1972. The order stipulated that any resolution by a lawmaker without the approval of his/her party would result in expulsion from the assembly. The order inspired Article 70 of the Constitution of Bangladesh, which bans free votes and crossing the floor.

== Enactment ==
The Assembly approved the Constitution on 4 November 1972, and it took effect on 16 December 1972, a day commemorated as Victory day in Bangladesh. Once the constitution came into effect, the Constituent Assembly became the provisional parliament of Bangladesh until the first elections under the new constitution were held in 1973.

== Legacy ==
The constitution founded the unitary parliamentary republic in Bangladesh. It laid down a list of fundamental rights in Bangladesh. The original 1972 constitution is often cited as the most democratic in Bangladesh's history, given later amendments which undermined the constitution's democratic credentials, including the separation of powers, the independence of the judiciary and the freedom of MPs to vote and debate in parliament. However, the constitution left wide powers for judicial review and judicial precedent, making Bangladesh a part of the common law world.

The first blows to the original constitution came in 1973 and 1974, when Prime Minister Sheikh Mujibur Rahman's government passed amendments that gave the state the power to suspend fundamental rights during a state of emergency. In 1975, Sheikh Mujibur Rahman enacted a presidential government under a one party state. Following his assassination, quasi-military rulers continued the presidential form of government, but restored multiparty politics. An executive presidency lasted till 1990, when parliamentary democracy was restored; and the presidency returned to its ceremonial nature.

As a result of the controversial Article 70, Bangladesh has never seen a no-confidence motion to remove a prime minister, even though the country's prime ministers are often accused of dictatorship and incompetence. The lack of checks and balances is often criticized.

The dominance of left-wing parties led by the Awami League in the constituent assembly resulted in numerous references to socialism in the document. The socialist influence contradicts with Bangladesh's largely free market economy.

The citizenship debate of "Bengali v Bangladeshi" contributed to a sense of alienation among the indigenous hill population in the country's southeast, and was seen as a factor behind the Chittagong Hill Tracts conflict, which lasted for two decades until 1997.

The unitary state laid down by the constitution has been a stumbling block for decentralizing Bangladesh's judiciary. When the government created High Courts in cities like Sylhet, Rajshahi and Chittagong in 1988, the Supreme Court ruled that it was in contradiction to the unitary nature of the state.

== See also ==
- Constituent Assembly of India
- Constituent Assembly of Pakistan
- Legislatures of British India
- Bengal Legislative Assembly
- Bengal Legislative Council
- Legislative Council of Eastern Bengal and Assam
