= Saiful Alam Saja =

Bangladeshi politician

- সাইফুল আলম সাজা

Member of the Bangladesh Parliament for Gaibandha-2
- In office 15 February 1996 – 12 June 1996
- Preceded by: Abdur Rashid Sarkar
- Succeeded by: Abdur Rashid Sarkar

Personal details
- Born: Gaibandha
- Party: Bangladesh Nationalist Party
- Nickname: Saja

Saiful Alam Saja (Bengali: সাইফুল আলম সাজা) is a Bangladesh Nationalist Party politician. He was elected a member of parliament from Gaibandha-2 in February 1996.

== Career ==
Saiful is a former member of the Central Executive Committee of the Bangladesh Nationalist Party and former president of Gaibandha district. He was elected to parliament uncontested from Gaibandha-2 as a Bangladesh Nationalist Party candidate in 15 February 1996 Bangladeshi general election.
