= Habibur Rahman (Chandpur politician) =

Bangladeshi politician, journalist, writer and publisher (1915 – 1985)

Hafez Hafez Habibur Rahman

Member of Bangladesh Constituent Assembly
- In office 1971–1973

Member of East Pakistan Provincial Assembly
- In office 12 March 1954 – 30 May 1954

Member of the National Assembly of Pakistan
- In office 7 December 1970 – 1971

Personal details
- Born: 1915
- Died: 24 December 1985 (aged 69–70)
- Party: Awami League
- Occupation: Politician, writer, journalist, publisher, professor

Hafez Habibur Rahman (1915 – 24 December 1985) was a Bangladeshi politician, journalist, writer and publisher. He was a member of the Bangladesh Constituent Assembly and a member of the Draft Constitution-Making Committee of Bangladesh.

He was elected as a Member of the then East Pakistan Provincial Assembly (MLA) in 1954 as a United Front candidate.

In 1970, he was elected a member of the Pakistan National Assembly (MNA) from the then Comilla-12 constituency as a candidate of Awami League in the Pakistani general election.
