= Shah Sarwar Kabir =

Bangladeshi politician (born 1973)

- শাহ সারোয়ার কবীর

Member of the Bangladesh Parliament for Gaibandha-2
- In office 10 January 2024 – 6 August 2024
- Preceded by: Mahabub Ara Begum Gini
- Succeeded by: Md. Abdul Karim

Personal details
- Born: 10 January 1973 (age 53)
- Party: Bangladesh Awami League
- Spouse: Masuma Akhter
- Relatives: Shah Abdul Hamid (grandfather)

Shah Sarwar Kabir (born 10 January 1973) is a Bangladeshi politician. He is a former Jatiya Sangsad member representing the Gaibandha-2 constituency in 2024.

== Early life and career ==
Kabir was born in Gaibandha. He was nominated as an independent candidate for the Gaibandha-2 constituency in the 2024 twelfth national parliament election.

After the fall of the Sheikh Hasina-led Awami League government, Kabir was detained from Dinajpur in April 2025.

== Personal life ==
Kabir is married to Masuma Akhter. Besides, his grandfather, Shah Abdul Hamid, was the first speaker of the Constituent Assembly.
