= Mohammad Shamsul Huda =

Bangladeshi politician and organizer of the Bangladesh Liberation War

Personal details
- Born: 1 February 1936 Mymensingh District, Gafargaon Upazila, Shahidanagar village, British India (now Bangladesh)
- Died: 24 November 2020 (aged 84) Shahidanagar, Gafargaon Upazila, Bangladesh
- Party: Awami League

Mohammad Shamsul Huda (February 1, 1936 – November 24, 2020) was a Bangladeshi politician, organizer of the Bangladesh Liberation War, and a leader of the Awami League. He was the Member of the National Assembly of Pakistan (MNA) from the Mymensingh-11.

== Career ==
Huda was actively involved in politics from his school years. In the 1970 Pakistani general election, he was elected as an MNA from the Awami League, representing the Mymensingh-11 constituency, which comprised Gafargaon and Bhaluka. He played a significant role as an organizer of the Liberation War of Bangladesh.

== Death ==
Huda died on November 24, 2020, in his home village of Shahidanagar, Gafargaon Upazila.
