= Gakhar Mandi =

Gakhar Gakhar Mandi
- City
- Location of Gakhar Gakhar (Pakistan) Gakhar (South Asia)
- Coordinates: 32°18′N 74°9′E
- Country: Pakistan
- Region: Punjab
- District: Wazirabad

Government
  - Type: Municipal Committee
  - Chairman: Vacant
  - Vice Chairman: Vacant
  - Chief Officer: Naveed Ashraf

Area
  - City: 13 km^{2} (5.0 sq mi)
- Elevation: 223 m (732 ft)

Population (2023)
  - City: 80,320
  - Rank: 158th in Pakistan
  - Density: 1,937/km^{2} (5,020/sq mi)
- Time zone: UTC+5 (PST)
- Calling code: (055)
- Number of Union Councils: 3
- Website: ghakhar.com

Gakhar Mandi (Punjabi: گکھڑ) is a city in the Wazirabad Tehsil of Punjab province in Pakistan. It is located between Wazirabad to the northwest and Gujranwala to the southeast. It is central to 33 villages, and the home of Pakistan's second-largest electrical grid.

Ghakhar Mandi is famous for its hand made industry and floor mats. It is also known for the production of rice, and wheat. It is also home to a historic railway station. Asia's oldest road, the Grand Trunk Road, which was built nearly 500 years ago by Sher Shah Suri passes through this city.

== Demographics ==
Population

Historical population
Year	Pop.	±%
1972	18,175	—
1981	27,789	+52.9%
1998	46,249	+66.4%
2017	65,517	+41.7%
2023	80,320	+22.6%

According to the 2023 Census of Pakistan, the population of Ghakhar reached 80,320, showing steady growth from the 65,517 residents recorded during the 2017 Census. Between 2017 and 2023, the city registered an annual population growth rate of 3.5%. The 2023 demographic structure reflects a gender distribution of 40,467 males (50.4%) and 39,836 females (49.6%).

== Notable people ==
- Muhammad Rafiq Tarar, former President of Pakistan.
- Sahibzada Farooq Ali, Former Speaker of the National Assembly of Pakistan.
- Qamar Javed Bajwa, former Chief of Army Staff of Pakistan Army
- Dr Humayon Dar, a globally renowned Islamic economist and advocate of Islamic banking and finance
- Nassar Ikram, Admiral in Pakistan Navy
- Babu Baral, Pakistani stage actor and comedian
