= Nazir Ahmed (politician, died 1972) =

Pakistani politician and medical doctor

- Born: Fazilpur, Dera Ghazi Khan
- Died: 8 June, 1972
- Occupation: Politician & medical doctor

Nazir Ahmed (???-died June 8, 1972) was a Pakistani politician and medical doctor who served as a member of the National Assembly of Pakistan until his murder on June 8, 1972.

== Biography ==
Nazir Ahmed was born in Fazilpur, Dera Ghazi Khan, to a family that had originally resided in Tehang, Jalandhar district, before moving to Faisalabad and eventually settling in Dera Ghazi Khan.

Nazir began his political career after he was introduced to Jamaat-e-Islami literature by a friend. He defeated Sir Mohammed Khan Leghari, the father of former president Farooq Leghari, in the 1970 Pakistani general elections for a National Assembly of Pakistan constituency representing Dera Ghazi Khan.

Two assassination attempts were made in June 1972, with the first on 6 June 1972 which he survived. On 8 June 1972, Nazir was assassinated in his clinic in Dera Ghazi Khan, Southern Punjab, while attending to his patients. The subsequent murder investigation implicated four police officials and an alleged hired assassin. Under interrogation, the assassin confessed that the assassination had been ordered by the then Prime Minister, Zulfikar Ali Bhutto, through Ghulam Mustafa Khar, the Governor of Punjab at the time, who later became a special assistant to Bhutto. The alleged motive for the murder was Ahmed's criticism of Bhutto's role in the 1971 loss of East Pakistan, which had become the independent nation of Bangladesh.
