= Abdur Rashid Sarkar =

Bangladeshi politician

- আব্দুর রশিদ সরকার

Member of Parliament For Gaibandha-2
- In office 1991–1996
- Preceded by: Asghar Ali Khan
- Succeeded by: Saifur Rahman
- In office June 1996 – 2001
- Preceded by: Saifur Rahman
- Succeeded by: Lutfor Rahman

Personal details
- Party: Jatiya Party (Ershad)

Abdur Rashid Sarkar is a Jatiya Party (Ershad) politician and a former member of parliament for Gaibandha-2.

== Career ==
Sarkar was elected to parliament from Gaibandha-2 as a Jatiya Party candidate in 1991 and June 1996. He contested the 2018 election from Gaibandha-2 as a Bangladesh Nationalist Party candidate after failing to get the Jatiya Party nomination.
