= Asghar Ali Khan (politician) =

Bangladeshi politician

Asghar Ali Khan MP
- আসগর আলী খান

Member of Parliament for Gaibandha-2
- In office 1988–1991
- Preceded by: Adur Rouf Mia
- Succeeded by: Abdur Rashid Sarkar

Personal details
- Party: Bangladesh Nationalist Party

Military service
- Rank: Major

Asghar Ali Khan is a Bangladesh Nationalist Party politician and a former member of parliament for Gaibandha-2.

== Career ==
Khan retired as a major from the Bangladesh Army in 1974. Then he joined the Bangladesh Textile Mills Corporation (BTMC). He was elected to parliament from Gaibandha-2 as an independent candidate in 1988. He contested the 1996 election from Gaibandha-2 as a Bangladesh Nationalist Party candidate. He was the founder president of Bangladesh Haji Collan Trust.
