= Mahabub Ara Begum Gini =

Bangladeshi politician

- মাহবুব আরা বেগম গিনি
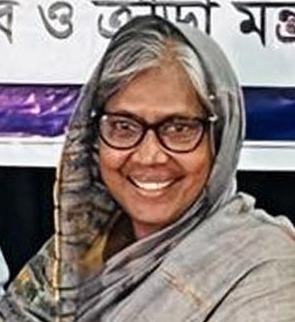

Member of the Bangladesh Parliament for Gaibandha-2
- In office 25 January 2009 – 29 January 2024
- Preceded by: Lutfor Rahman
- Succeeded by: Shah Sarwar Kabir

Personal details
- Born: 1 August 1961 (age 64) Gaibandha, Bangladesh
- Party: Bangladesh Awami League
- Relatives: Mohammad Abdul Wajed Miah (granduncle)
- Education: B.S.S (Hons.), M.S.S., B.Ed
- Alma mater: University of Dhaka
- Profession: Business, politics

Mahabub Ara Begum Gini (born 1 August 1961) is a Bangladesh Awami League politician, a former Jatiya Sangsad member representing the Gaibandha-2 constituency, and a former whip in the parliament.

== Biography ==
Gini graduated from the University of Dhaka. She was elected to parliament from Gaibandha-2 in 2009 as a candidate of Bangladesh Awami League. She won the nomination for the 2014 general election in 2013, despite some opposition from local party members of Bangladesh Awami League.

On 5 March 2012, Gini criticised Khaleda Zia and questioned the paternity of her son Tarique Rahman on the floor of the parliament. Her speech was criticised by The Daily Star who called the speech "vile". Minority rights group, Bangladesh Hindu-Buddhist-Christian Unity Council, have accused her of grabbing the land of minorities.

Gini would win the election in 2014. She is a member of the Parliamentary Standing Committee on Women and Children's Affairs. The body has called for the introduction of housing for female workers in rural areas.

In April 2017, Gini was elected vice-president of Bangladesh Olympic Association for a four-year term. In June 2017 she distributed aid for flood victims in her constituency of Gaibandha.

Gini was detained in October 2024 after the fall of the Sheikh Hasina led Awami League government in August.
