= Md. Abdul Karim (Gaibandha politician) =

Bangladeshi politician (born 1960)

Members of Parliament
- Incumbent
- Assumed office 17 February 2026
- Preceded by: Shah Sarwar Kabir
- Constituency: Gaibandha-2

Personal details
- Born: 6 July 1960 (age 65)
- Party: Bangladesh Jamaat-e-Islami
- Occupation: Politician

Md. Abdul Karim (born 6 July 1960) is a Bangladeshi politician elected as a Member of Parliament for Gaibandha-2 in the 2026 Bangladeshi general election, representing Bangladesh Jamaat-e-Islami.
