= Abdur Rouf Mia =

Bangladeshi politician

- আবদুর রউফ মিয়া

Member of Parliament For Gaibandha-2
- In office 1986–1988
- Succeeded by: Asghar Ali Khan

Personal details
- Party: Jatiya Party (Ershad)

Abdur Rouf Mia (Bengali: আবদুর রউফ মিয়া) is a Jatiya Party (Ershad) politician and a former member of parliament for Gaibandha-2.

== Career ==
Mia was elected to parliament from Gaibandha-2 as a Jatiya Party candidate in 1986.
