= Shah Mahatab Ahmad =

Bangladeshi politician

Member of the Bangladesh Parliament for Dinajpur-8
- In office 1973–1976

Member of the Bangladesh Parliament for Dinajpur-9
- In office 1979–1982

Personal details
- Party: Bangladesh Awami League

Shah Mahatab Ahmad is a Bangladesh Awami League politician and a former member of parliament for Dinajpur-8 and Dinajpur-9.

== Career ==
Ahmad was elected to parliament from Dinajpur-8 as a Bangladesh Awami League candidate in 1973. He was elected from constituency Dinajpur-9 in 1979.
