= ANM Nazrul Islam =

Bangladeshi politician (1940–2020)

Member of Bangladesh Parliament
- In office 1973–1976

Personal details
- Born: 1939 or 1940
- Died: 23 June 2020 (aged 80) Dhaka, Bangladesh
- Party: Awami League

ANM Nazrul Islam (Bengali: অ ন ম নজরুল ইসলাম; born 1939 or 1940; died 23 June 2020) was an Awami League politician in Bangladesh and a member of parliament for Mymensingh-16.

== Biography ==
Islam earned a master's degree in Bengali literature from the University of Dhaka.

He taught at Ananda Mohan College and Chittagong University.

He was elected to the National Assembly of Pakistan in 1970. During the Bangladesh Liberation war he worked as an aide to Syed Nazrul Islam of the Mujibnagar Government. He was elected to parliament from Mymensingh-16 as an Awami League candidate in 1973.

Islam died on 23 June 2020 in Dhaka, Bangladesh.
