= D. M. H Obaidur Raza Chowdhury =

Bangladeshi politician

D. M. H Obaidur Raza Choudhury

Member of Bangladesh Parliament
- In office 1970–1973
- Succeeded by: A. Zahur Miah

Personal details
- Born: 1921
- Died: 1982 (aged 60–61)
- Party: Bangladesh Awami League

D. M. H Obaidur Raza Chowdhury (1921-1982) was an Awami League politician and a member of parliament for Sylhet-5.

== Career ==
Chowdhury was elected to parliament from Sylhet-5 as an Awami League candidate in 1970.
