= Mohammad Moksed Ali =

Bangladeshi politician

Member of Bangladesh Parliament
- In office 1979–1986

Personal details
- Party: Bangladesh Nationalist Party

Mohammad Moksed Ali (Bengali: মোহাম্মদ মকসেদ আলী) is a Bangladesh Nationalist Party politician and a former member of parliament for Rajshahi-14.

== Career ==
Ali was elected to parliament from Rajshahi-14 as a Bangladesh Nationalist Party candidate in 1979.
