= Gaibandha-2 =

Constituency of Bangladesh's Jatiya Sangsad

Coordinates: 25.33°N 89.52°E

- Constituency for the Jatiya Sangsad
- District: Gaibandha District
- Division: Rangpur Division
- Electorate: 411,460 (2026)

Current constituency
- Created: 1984
- Party: Bangladesh Jamaat-e-Islami
- Member: Md. Abdul Karim
- ← 29 Gaibandha-1 31 Gaibandha-3 →

Gaibandha-2 is a constituency represented in the Jatiya Sangsad (National Parliament) of Bangladesh since 2026 by Md. Abdul Karim of the Bangladesh Jamaat-e-Islami.

== Boundaries ==
The constituency encompasses Gaibandha Sadar Upazila.

== History ==
The constituency was created in 1984 from a Rangpur constituency when the former Rangpur District was split into five districts: Nilphamari, Lalmonirhat, Rangpur, Kurigram, and Gaibandha.

== Members of Parliament ==
Election	Member	Party
1986	Abdur Rouf Mia	Jatiya Party
1988	Asghar Ali Khan	Independent
1991	Abdur Rashid Sarkar	Jatiya Party
Feb 1996	Md. Umar Faruk	Bangladesh Nationalist Party
Jun 1996	Abdur Rashid Sarkar	Jatiya Party
2001	Lutfur Rahman	Awami League
2008	Mahabub Ara Begum Gini	Awami League
2024	Shah Sarwar Kabir	Independent
2026	Md. Abdul Karim	Bangladesh Jamaat-e-Islami

== Elections ==
=== Elections in the 2020s ===
General Election 2026: Gaibandha-2
Party	Candidate	Votes	%	±%
Jamaat	Md. Abdul Karim	122,630	50.6	N/A
BNP	Anisuzzaman Khan Babu	92,890	38.3	N/A
JP(E)	Abdur Rashid Sarkar	21,310	8.8	N/A
IAB	Mohammad Abdul Majed	2,367	1.0	N/A
CPB	Mihir Kumar Ghosh	2,342	1.0	N/A
BSD (Marxist)	Ahsanul Habib Sayeed	629	0.3	N/A
Janotar Dol	Shahedur Jahan	197	0.1	N/A
Majority		29,740	12.3	N/A
Turnout		242,365	58.9	N/A
Jamaat gain from Independent				

=== Elections in the 2010s ===
General Election 2014: Gaibandha-2
Party	Candidate	Votes	%	±%
AL	Mahabub Ara Begum Gini	51,713	83.7	+8.1
Independent	Makdubar Rahman Sarkar	10,058	16.3	N/A
Majority		41,655	67.4	+13.9
Turnout		61,771	20.9	−62.5
AL hold				

=== Elections in the 2000s ===
General Election 2008: Gaibandha-2
Party	Candidate	Votes	%	±%
AL	Mahabub Ara Begum Gini	166,726	75.6	+38.3
BNP	Shafiq-ur Rahman	48,682	22.1	+6.0
BSD	Md Monzur Alom Mithu	4,036	1.8	N/A
CPB	Khandaker Manzurul Karim	623	0.3	−1.4
BKA	AKM Bin Kashem Chowdhury	434	0.2	N/A
Majority		118,044	53.5	+52.9
Turnout		220,501	83.4	+8.5
AL hold				

General Election 2001: Gaibandha-2
Party	Candidate	Votes	%	±%
AL	Lutfur Rahman	68,598	37.3	+9.1
IJOF	Abdur Rashid Sarkar	67,519	36.7	N/A
BNP	Anisuzzaman Khan Babu	29,606	16.1	+7.1
Jatiya Party (M)	Abdur Rouf Mia	4,760	2.6	N/A
Independent	Md. Fazlur Rahman Sarkar	4,127	2.2	N/A
Independent	Asghar Ali Khan	3,591	2.0	N/A
CPB	Shahadat Hossain	3,046	1.7	+0.9
Bangladesh Samajtantrik Dal (Basad-Khalekuzzaman)	Md. Ahsanul Habib	2,377	1.3	+0.5
JSD	Md. Gazi Shah Shariful Islam Bablu	273	0.1	−0.3
Majority		1,079	0.6	−20.3
Turnout		183,897	74.9	+2.6
AL gain from BNP				

=== Elections in the 1990s ===
General Election June 1996: Gaibandha-2
Party	Candidate	Votes	%	±%
JP(E)	Abdur Rashid Sarkar	69,370	49.1	+7.7
AL	Lutfur Rahman	39,860	28.2	N/A
Jamaat	Md. Aminul Haque	15,299	10.8	−5.1
BNP	Asghar Ali Khan	12,760	9.0	+4.7
Bangladesh Samajtantrik Dal (Khalekuzzaman)	Md. Ahsanul Habib	1,120	0.8	N/A
CPB	Shahadat Hossain	1,088	0.8	N/A
JSD	Md. Sirajul Islam Babu	546	0.4	N/A
BNAP	A. H. M. Lutfar Rahman	458	0.3	N/A
IOJ	Md. Abdul Based	304	0.2	N/A
Zaker Party	Md. Saidur Rahman	281	0.2	+0.1
Gano Forum	Mahbub Elahi	185	0.1	N/A
Majority		29,510	20.9	+0.5
Turnout		141,271	72.3	+13.5
JP(E) hold				

General Election 1991: Gaibandha-2
Party	Candidate	Votes	%	±%
JP(E)	Abdur Rashid Sarkar	49,930	41.4	
BAKSAL	Lutfar Rahman	25,324	21.0	
Jamaat	Aminul Haq	19,137	15.9	
Independent	Azghar Ali Khan	13,045	10.8	
BNP	Farukul Islam	5,221	4.3	
Independent	Khalekuzzaman Khan	3,215	2.7	
Independent	Hasan Mahamud Siddque	1,460	1.2	
Independent	Makdubar Rahaman	629	0.5	
Independent	Sudrul Kabir	235	0.2	
Independent	Md. Abdus Subhan	196	0.2	
Zaker Party	Nazmul Arefin	177	0.1	
BKA	Ajijur Rahman Prodhan	170	0.1	
BML	Shariful Islam	137	0.1	
Jatiya Samajtantrik Dal-JSD	Gazi Shah Sariful Islam	109	0.1	
JSD (S)	Kabil Hossain	71	0.1	
Majority		24,606	20.4	
Turnout		120,594	58.8	
JP(E) gain from Independent				
