= Dewan Abul Abbas =

East-Pakistani and Bangladeshi politician

Dewan Abul Abbas (1 March 1926 – date of death unknown) was a Pakistani and Bangladeshi politician who represented Comilla in the East Pakistan Provincial Assembly.

== Early life and education ==
Abbas was born on 1 March 1926 in Barikandi village, Nabinagar thana, Comilla District (now Brahmanbaria District). He obtained a master's degree in English and an LL.B. in 1952. He practised as a lawyer.

== Political career ==
In 1962, Abbas was elected to the East Pakistan Provincial Assembly. He subsequently served as a member of the Constituent Assembly of Bangladesh.

== Personal life ==
Abbas's elder son, Dewan Aftabul Alam, resides in Wari, Dhaka. His younger son, Dewan Ashraful Alam, resides in New York.
