= Masihur Rahman =

Masihur Rahman is an economist and a former civil servant of the Bangladesh government. During his career, he held many important government offices and represented the government at the World Bank, the Asian Development Bank, the International Fund for Agricultural Development, and the Islamic Development Bank.

Considered as one of the country's foremost experts in economics, he has authored several books on economics and politics, and his articles have been published in different journals. Since 2002, he has contributed articles to newspapers and journals published in Dhaka.

In 2006, while serving as the managing director and the economic adviser to the Board of the Credit Rating Agency of Bangladesh Ltd. (CRAB), he was elected as a member of the Best Practices Committee of the Association of Credit Rating Agencies in Asia (ACRAA). As of summer/fall 2008, he is touring across campuses in the United States giving lectures on the politics of Bangladesh at conferences.

== Education ==
Masihur Rahman studied economics at Dhaka University from 1959 to 1963. He obtained his master's degree from Harvard Kennedy School at Harvard University in 1976, and his PhD from the Fletcher School of Law and Diplomacy at Tufts University in 1980.

== Career ==
Masihur Rahman joined the Civil Service of Pakistan (CSP) in October 1965. He held several important government offices including:

- Secretary of Internal Resource Division
- Chairman of National Board of Revenue (NBR)
- Secretary of Economic Relations Division
- Secretary of Statistics Division
- Director General of Bangladesh Bureau of Statistics (BBS)
- Secretary of Railway Division
- Director General of Bangladesh Railway
- Secretary of Ministry of Labour, Manpower & Employment
- Secretary of Ministry of Water Resources

During his career, he represented the government as alternate governor, acting governor or member of the board of directors at the World Bank, the Asian Development Bank, the International Fund for Agricultural Development (IFAD), the Islamic Development Bank (IDB) and its affiliate for private sector development. He was chair of the evaluation committee of IFAD (mid-1980s) and as vice-chair presided over the business sessions at the annual meeting of IDB in 2001.

He retired from his government service in October 2001.

== Books and publications ==
His published monographs and books include:

- Rahman, Masihur; Montgomery, John (1980). Integrated Rural Development. Cambridge, Mass.: Lincoln Institute of Land. OCLC 11419836.
- Rahman, Masihur (1987). Political Economy of Income Distribution in Sri Lanka. Dhaka: University Press Limited.
- —— (1993). Bangladesh: Structural Adjustment, Employment and Social Protection for Workers. Delhi: ILO. ISBN 92-2-109235-6.
- —— (1994). Structural Adjustment, Employment, and Workers. Dhaka: University Press Limited. ISBN 984-05-1270-6.
- —— (2008). Democracy in Crisis. Dhaka: University Press Limited. ISBN 978-984-506-007-3.
