= Lutfor Rahman (Bangladeshi politician) =

Bangladeshi politician

- লুৎফর রহমান

Member of Parliament for Rangpur-19
- In office 1973–1976
- Preceded by: Abdur Rashid Sarkar
- Succeeded by: Mahabub Ara Begum Gini

Member of Parliament for Rangpur-20
- In office 1979–1982
- Preceded by: Waliur Rahman

Member of Parliament for Gaibandha-2
- In office 2001–2006

Personal details
- Died: 22 February 2008 Labaid Hospital.
- Party: Awami League

Lutfor Rahman was a Awami League politician and the former Member of Parliament from Rangpur District.

== Career ==
Rahman was elected to parliament from Rangpur-19 as an Awami League candidate in 1973. He was elected to parliament from Rangpur-20 as an Awami League candidate in 1979.

Rahman was elected to parliament from Gaibandha-2 as an Awami League candidate in 2001.

== Death ==
Rahman died on 22 February 2008 in Labaid Hospital.
