= Abdul Momin Talukdar =

Bangladeshi politician

Deputy Minister of Local Government, Rural Development and Cooperative

Personal details
- Born: 1 December 1929 Belkuchi, Pabna, East Bengal
- Died: 15 August 1995 (aged 65) Dhaka
- Party: Bangladesh Awami League

Abdul Momin Talukdar (1 December 1929 – 15 August 1995) was a Bangladeshi Awami League politician, lawyer and former member of parliament and the former Deputy Minister of Local Government, Rural Development and Cooperative.

== Early life ==
Talukdar was born on 1 September 1929 in Belkuchi, Pabna, East Bengal. He graduated from Pabna Edward College and went to law school in Dhaka University, starting his career from Pabna district bar.

== Career ==
Talukdar started politics during his student life in the Purba Bangla Chhatra League. he was involved in the language movement of 1952. He was the convener of All Party State Language Movement of Dhaka University. He is a former vice president of Pabna district Awami League. He was elected to Pakistan National Assembly in 1970 from the Awami League.

During the Bangladesh liberation war in 1971 he served as the motivation officer in the Mukti bahini training camp. He visited Nepal as a representative of Mujibnagar government to garner support for the Independence of Bangladesh. After the Independence of Bangladesh, he was elected to Parliament of Bangladesh in 1973. He served as the Deputy Minister of the Ministry of Local Government, Rural Development and Co-operatives in the Awami League government.

== Death ==
Talukdar died on 15 August 1995 in Dhaka.
