= Jafar Ali Shah =

Jafar Ali Shah was a politician from Chitral, Pakistan. He was the grandson of Ataliq Bahader Shah and son of Ataliq Sarfraz Shah. He won all of the elections he participated in. He was a Member of the Legislative Assembly from Chitral during the Zulfiqar Bhutto era and was Member of the Shoora during the Zia ul Haq era. He helped to create the Lowari Tunnel. He was Parliamentary Secretary and while representing his constituency NW-15 Chitral-cum-Dir-cum-Swat, Jafar Ali Shah also had the privilege of being one of the signatories of the 1973 Constitution of the Islamic Republic of Pakistan.
