= Shah Abdul Hamid =

Bangladeshi politician (1900–1972)

1st Speaker of Constituent Assembly of Bangladesh
- In office 10 April 1972 – 1 May 1972
- Deputy: Mohammad Mohammadullah
- Preceded by: position established
- Succeeded by: Mohammad Mohammadullah

Member of the Central Legislative Assembly
- In office 1945–1947
- Preceded by: Khabeeruddin Ahmed
- Constituency: Rajshahi

Personal details
- Born: 1900 Gobindaganj, Rangpur district, Bengal Presidency
- Died: 1 May 1972 (aged 71–72) Gaibandha, Bangladesh
- Party: Bangladesh Awami League; All-India Muslim League
- Relatives: Shah Sarwar Kabir (son-in-law)
- Education: University of Calcutta; Carmichael College

Shah Abdul Hamid (Bengali: শাহ আব্দুল হামিদ; 1900 – 1 May 1972) was a Bangladeshi political activist, Awami League politician, legislator and banker.

== Early life and education ==
Shah Abdul Hamid was born in 1900 to Bengali Muslim parents Haji Abdul Ghaffar Shah and Rahima Khatun in the village of Khalshi in Gobindaganj, then part of the Rangpur district of the Bengal Presidency (Now Gaibandha). He completed his Bachelor of Arts from Carmichael College, Rangpur in 1920. During his student life, Abdul Hamid participated in the Non-cooperation movement initiated by Chittaranjan Das. In 1927, he obtained a law degree from the University of Calcutta and began practice at the Court of Gaibandha.

== Professional life ==
After completion of his education, he returned to Gaibandha and started working as a sports organizer. He was the General Secretary of Gaibandha Town Club. He played the pioneer role in founding the Gaibandha College in 1947 of which he became the first Secretary of the Managing Committee. He was elected Chairman of the Rangpur School Board in 1949.

He was actively associated with "Jeorge Coronation Dramatic Club" (now Gibandha Nattya Sangstha) and performed on stage.

He was Director of the National Bank of Pakistan from 1951 to 1955.

== Political life ==
Shah Abdul Hamid took part in the Law defying Movement in 1930. In 1936, he joined the Muslim League. In 1941, Hamid was elected Vice Chairman of Rangpur District Board, a post he was to hold for 12 years.

In 1945, he was elected Member of the Legislative Assembly of India. He joined Bangladesh Awami League in 1956 and was the President of Rangpur Awami League up to 1966.

In 1970, representing the Awami League, he was elected member of the National Assembly of Pakistan for Rangpur V (Gobindaganj-Palashbari). At the very outset of the Liberation War, he went to India and played a vital role in organizing the resistance movement.

Hamid was the first Speaker of the Jatiya Sangsad of the Gana Parishad (National Assembly), serving from 10 April to 1 May 1972.

The Shah Abdul Hamid Stadium, Gaibandha, is named in his honour.
