= Khandaker Abdul Hafeez =

Bangladeshi politician

Member of Bangladesh Parliament
- In office 1973–1976

Personal details
- Born: March 1, 1930 Mirzapur, Jessore District, British India
- Died: September 5, 2001 (aged 71) Jessore, Bangladesh
- Party: Awami League

Khandaker Abdul Hafeez (Bengali: খন্দকার আবদুল হাফিজ; 1 March 1930 – 5 September 2001) was an Awami League politician in Bangladesh and a member of parliament for Jessore-13.

== Biography ==
Hafeez was born on 1 March 1930 to Safura Khatun and Khandaker Abdul Wadud in Mirzapur village of Jessore district, British India (now in Narail Sadar Upazila, Bangladesh).

He earned his HSC from Khulna BL College in 1947 and completed an LLB from Dhaka University in 1955.

Hafeez was elected to parliament from Jessore-13 as an Awami League candidate in 1973.

Hafeez died on 5 September 2001 in Jessore, Bangladesh.
