= Sahibzada Farooq Ali =

Pakistani politician (1931–2020)

Sahibzada Farooq Ali صاهب زادا فاروق علی

7th Speaker of the National Assembly
- In office 9 August 1973 – 27 March 1977
- Deputy: Ashraf Khatoon Abbasi
- Preceded by: Fazal Ilahi Chaudhry
- Succeeded by: Malik Meraj Khalid

Personal details
- Born: 5 September 1931 Ghakhar Mandi, British Raj (now Pakistan)
- Died: 29 November 2020 (aged 89) Multan, Pakistan
- Party: Pakistan Peoples Party

Sahibzada Farooq Ali (5 September 1931 – 29 November 2020) was a Pakistani politician, the ninth Speaker of National Assembly of Pakistan. He was elected from the city of Multan.

== Early life ==
Sahibzada Farooq Ali was born on 5 September 1931. He belonged to the Toor tribe and was native of Wayanwali village near Ghakhar Mandi in Pakistan's Wazirabad.

== Career ==
Ali was the head of the Information and Public Relations department and the Arts and Culture department for Multan and Bahawalpur before going to the parliament. He was the chairman of the Special Committee of the whole House of the National Assembly of Pakistan, proceedings of which were held in camera to consider the Ahmadiyya issue. The Special Committee unanimously adopted a resolution on September 7, 1974 to declare the Ahmadiyya Movement and its offshoot, the Lahore Ahmadiyya Movement for the Propagation of Islam to be non-Muslims.

== Acting President of Pakistan ==
Sahibzada Farooq Ali was the acting President of Pakistan from 19 August 1973–25 August 1973, when President Fazal Ilahi Chaudhry went abroad for medical treatment.

== Death ==
Sahibzada Farooq Ali died on 29 November 2020 in Multan. His funeral prayers were held at Shahi Eidgah and was attended by large number of people.

Political offices
Preceded by Fazal Ilahi Chaudhry	Speaker of the National Assembly; 1973–1977	Succeeded by Malik Meraj Khalid
