= Mir Ali Bakhsh Khan Talpur =

Pakistani politician (born 1926)

- مير علي بخش خان ٽالپر

Personal details
- Born: 1926 Mir Ji Landhi, Taluka Kot Ghulam Muhammad, District Mirpur Khas, Sindh, Pakistan
- Died: 30 April 1980 (aged 53–54) London, England
- Resting place: Chitori, Near Mirpur Khas, Sindh, Pakistan
- Children: Jannat Talpur, Mir Behram Ali Talpur, Mir Munwar Ali Talpur, Mir Anwar Ali Talpur,Mir Akber Ali Talpur
- Parent: Mir Sher Muhammad Talpur (great-grandfather)
- Occupation: Politician and reformer
- Known for: His struggle against Marshal Law and his struggle for rights of peasants

Mir Ali Bakhsh Khan Talpur (1926 - 30 April 1980) was a politician and social reformist from Sindh, Pakistan. He was elected as member of National Assembly of Pakistan in 1970. He joined Baloch Movement in 1973 and then Awami Tahreek of Rasool Bux Palijo. He supported Mohtarma Fatima Jinnah against Field Marshal Muhammad Ayoob Khan, the Military dictator of Pakistan. He also opposed General Zia's Marshal Law. Despite owning thousands of acres of agricultural land, he spent his life trying to provide solace to the dirt-poor masses of Sindh.

== Childhood ==
Mir Ali Bakhsh Khan Talpur was born in 1926 in Village Mir Ji Landhi, Taluka Kot Ghulam Muhammad, District Mirpur Khas in the house of Mir Allahdad Khan Talpur. He was youngest among the three brothers. He passed Matriculation Examination from Government High School Mirpur Khas and earned a Bachelor of Arts degree from D.J. Sindh College Karachi.

== Political career ==
Mir Ali Bakhsh Khan Talpur belonged to the famous Talpur family of Mirpur Khas Sindh. His father Mir Allahdad Khan Talpur served as member of Bombay Assembly and then member of Sindh Legislative Assembly. His great-grandfather Mir Sher Muhammad Khan Talpur is well known for this struggle and war against the British Rule in India.

He began his political activities as a member of National Awami Party of Maulana Abdul Hamid Khan Bhashani. He worked actively for the rights of peasants and the poor masses of the country. He was close associate of Maulana Bhashani, Shaikh Mujeeb-ur-Rehman, Hussain Shaheed Suharwardy, Hyder Bux Jatoi, G.M. Syed, Khan Abdul Ghafar Khan, Shaikh Abdul Majeed Sindhi and others. He played an important role against the Marshal Law imposed by General Muhammad Ayub Khan. Along with the above-mentioned leaders, he played a crucial role in the struggle against the Marshal Law regime of General Muhammad Ayub Khan. He supported Mohtarma Fatima Jinnah when she contested presidential election against General Ayub Khan in 1965.

He joined Pakistan Peoples Party (PPP) in the late 1960s and was elected as member of National Assembly of Pakistan in 1970. After Pakistan India war of 1971, many Hindu families migrated to India. On the directions of the Bhutto Government, Mir Ali Nawaz Khan Talpur accompanied by Rana Bhagwandas and Pir Ghulam Rasool Shah Jeelani visited Barmer City of India and encouraged the Hindu migrants to return to Pakistan.

When the PPP-led government ordered a military operation in Balochistan in 1973, he opposed the decision and parted ways with the PPP. He later joined the Baloch movement. Due to his expression of solidarity with Baloch leaders, he was imprisoned in Quetta and tortured for about 18 months. He also opposed the Marshal Law imposed by General Zia-ul-Haque in 1977. It is claimed that General Zia-ul-Haque offered him to be Governor of Sindh but Mir Ali Bakhsh refused this offer.

During the last days of his life, he joined the Awami Tahreek of Rasool Bux Palijo. He remained associated with this party till his death.

== Death ==
Mir Ali Bakhsh Khan Talpur died on 30 April 1980 in a hospital of London, England. His body was brought to Pakistan and buried in Chitori (Sindhi: چٽوڙي) graveyard near Mirpur Khas.
