= Syed Nasir Ali Rizvi =

Pakistani politician

Syed Nasir Ali Rizvi (born 5 January 1935) was a Pakistani politician.

== Education ==
He started his education at Govt. High School of Kehror Pacca. He continued at Multan Convent, Mayfair School of Calcutta and completed his bachelor's degree from Forman Christian College, Lahore. Following his father, after completing his studies, he joined Pakistan Military Academy, Kakool.

== Career ==
He resigned from the Army in 1957 and began his political career in 1958.

He joined Maader-e-Millat Mohtarma Fatima Jinnah in her campaign against the dictator Ayub Khan. He was elected General Secretary of the Multan Council, Muslim League in 1965. He was the only person to contest elections against the group of Nawab of Kalabagh. He was elected as a Member of Multan Divisional Council. He was the only member on the opposition benches in the Multan Divisional Council.

In 1968, he joined Zulfikar Ali Bhutto‘s caravan in his campaign against Ayub Khan. He later played a major role formation of Pakistan People's Party with Bhutto.

In 1970, he contested the General Elections on PPP's ticket and won by 63,000 votes.

In 1971, he went to Dhaka with Bhutto for talks with Sheikh Mujib-ur-Rehman.

In 1972, he again accompanied Bhutto to Moscow, for talks with the Soviets. Later that year he became member of Rural Development Board, Telephone and Telegraph Committee. He represented Pakistan in the United Nations.

In 1973, he accompanied Bhutto to Iran on the invitation of the Shah of Iran. He also became joined the Sindh TAS Committee.

In 1974, he became Secretary General of PPP, Punjab; and headed a delegation to Romania for Romania's 11th Congress, where he delivered Bhutto's message to the Romanian President. He became a member of Punjab Small Industries Corporation and the Federal Member of Organizing Committee of PPP.

In 1976 he became the Secretary General and Deputy Secretary General of PPP, Pakistan. He also became Federal Minister for Housing, Works & Urban Development, which led him to play a major role in the development of Pakistan. He played a major role in the construction of the Faisal Mosque, which was constructed during his ministry. He traveled with Bhutto for discussions to Korea and China. He represented Pakistan at the Canada Habitat Conference, and presided over the conference. He led a delegation to Sweden for talks, and later went to the UK to address overseas Pakistanis on the subject of the race riots of the time.

In 1978 the Assemblies were dissolved and martial law was declared. Rizvi's political career paused for 15 years.

In 1993, after the dictatorship had been cleared, he ran again but lost due to severe vote rigging.

He died in a car accident on the 5 February 2000.
