= Mukhtar Rana =

Pakistani Politician and Educator (1928–2014)

- Born: Mukhtar Rana; 8 April 1928
- Died: 16 July 2014 (aged 86)
- Occupations: Politician, activist, educator

A very sad fact about Mr Rana by Naseem Bajwa

Mukhtar Rana (8 April 1928 – 16 July 2014) was a Pakistani politician, activist, and educator; he was one of the founding members of the Pakistan People's Party (PPP).

== Early life and education ==
Mukhtar Rana was born on 8 April 1928 in Ferozepur, India. He attended high school in Ferozepur, and graduated junior high school in Islamia College, Jalandhar. He graduated from Islamia College, Karachi. He also got an MA in English literature from Government College, Lahore. Later, in the 1990s, he received another MA in international relations from Kent University, United Kingdom. In 1947–48, he got involved in Trade unions for the rights of textile workers mostly. He was a trade union leader in the, 1960s when the country was growing weary of President Ayub Khan's military rule. Later, he moved to Faisalabad (then Lyallpur) and joined the Khalsa Degree College (now Faisalabad Municipal Degree College) as a lecturer.
