= Humayun Khalid =

Bangladeshi politician

Member of Bangladesh Parliament
- In office 1973–1976

Personal details
- Political party: Awami League

Humayun Khalid (Bengali: হুমায়ুন খালিদ) is a Awami League politician and a former member of parliament for Tangail-9.

== Career ==
Khalid was elected to parliament from Tangail-9 as an Awami League candidate in 1973.
