= Zafar Ahmed Ansari =

Pakistani politician (1908–1991)

Molana Zafar Ahmad Ansari ظفر احمد انصاری

Member of the National Assembly of Pakistan
- In office 14 April 1972 – 10 January 1977
- Constituency: NW-133 (Karachi VI)

Personal details
- Born: 1908
- Died: 1991 (aged 82–83)
- Party: All India Muslim League
- Education: University of Allahabad

Zafar Ahmad Ansari (Urdu: ظفر احمد انصاری; 1908 – 1991) Pakistani Muslim scholar, politician and joint secretary of All India Muslim League. He was an expert in constitutional law and Islam. He was appointed to the Council of Islamic Ideology in Pakistan in 1977.

== Education and early life ==
He did his MA Hons. in Philosophy and also was a qualified LLB lawyer.

== Personal and Family life ==
He spent most of his life in a flat in Saeed Manzil, Karachi. His son Dr Ishaq Zafar Ansari(d.2016) was a renowned educationist who retired as President of International Islamic University Islamabad.

== Political career ==
He was elected as a member of National Assembly in 1970 elections. He was a key figure in formulating the 1973 constitution. He was amongst the pioneer members of Mutamar Alim e Islami. He was the founding Chairman of the commission setup by President General Zia Ul Haq to advise Islamic changes in constitution in the light of Shariah. It was later named as Ansari Commission.

== Books ==
-Pakistan and Muslim India was Translated by Zafar Ahmed Ansari under the title 'Pakistan Aur Musalman', Published from Delhi in 1944.

-Gandhi As I Knew Him, Author Indulal Yagnik was Translated by Zafar Ahmed Ansari under the title with the title 'Pir-i-Sabarmati', Published from Delhi in 1943. 'Pir-i-Sabarmati'. This flawless translation in Urdu, is being published again from Karachi, tentative date of publication is August 2018.
