= Mir Dariya Khan Khosa =

Member of the National Assembly of Pakistan

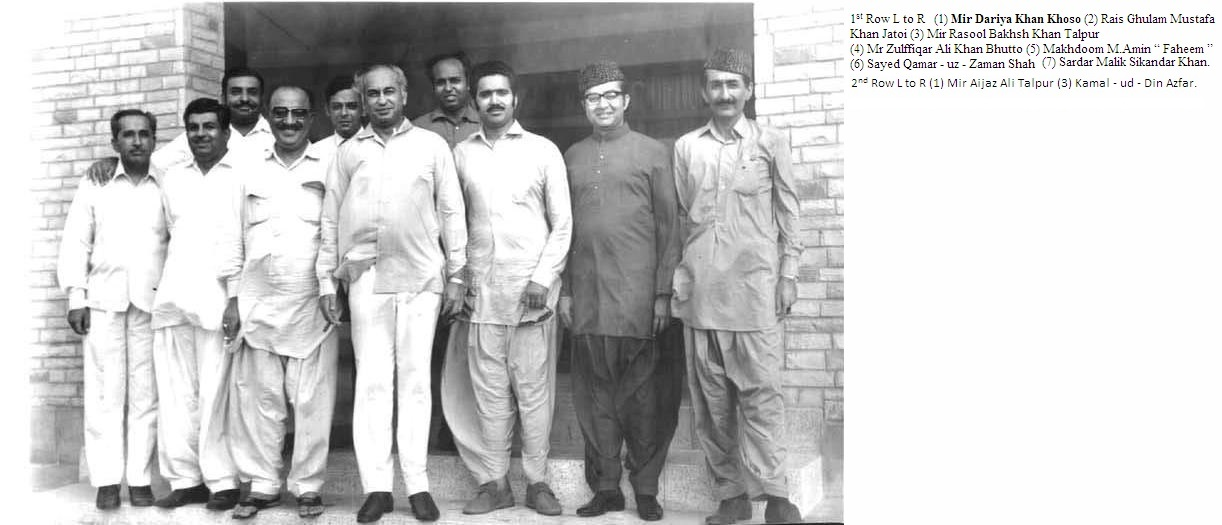
Khosa (left) with others

Mir Dariya Khan Khosa(1925–2006) was a politician of the Jacobabad District who was a Member of the National Assembly of Pakistan from 1962 to 1977. He was the grandson of Mir Bahadur Khan Khosa, father of MPA Mir Hassan Khan Khosa. Mir Sahib died on 4 November 2006 in Karachi. He was buried in his native village "Dinpur" Taluk Thul District Jacobabad.
