= Saeed-ur-Rashid Abbasi =

Pakistani politician

Federal Minister of the Government of Pakistan

Shahzada Saeed-ur-Rasheed Abbasi is a former Federal Minister of the Government of Pakistan and the son of the last ruling Monarch of the Bahawalpur Kingdom, Sir Sadiq Muhammad Khan Abbasi V.

He petitioned the desealing of his ancestral Sadiqgarh Palace and auctioned off the antiques. He is the brother of Prince Aminul Rashid Abbasi. The cars (14 Rolls-Royces, Renaults and Cadillacs) alone fetched a 10 million Rupee Mark.
