= Mohammad Khorshed Alam =

Bangladeshi politician

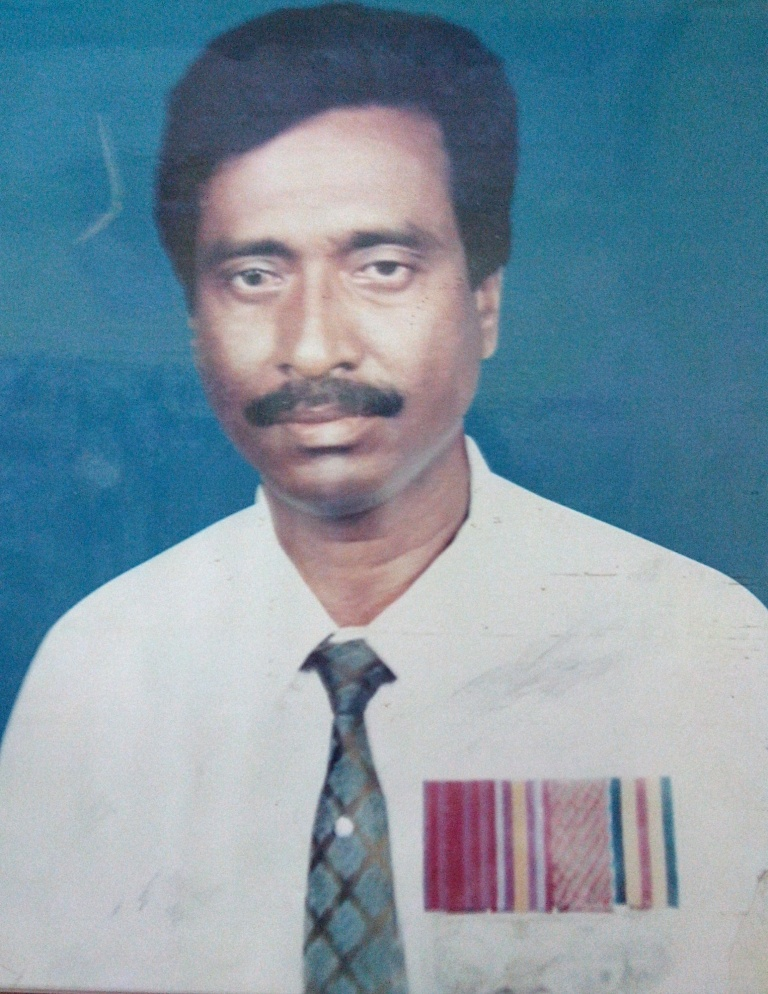
- Mohammad Khorshed Alam (Bir Pratik) after the medal presentation ceremony.

Member of Bangladesh Parliament
- In office 7 March 1973 – 6 November 1976

Personal details
- Party: Awami League

Mohammad Khorshed Alam (Bengali: মোহাম্মদ খোরশেদ আলম) is an Awami League politician in Bangladesh and a former member of parliament for Comilla-15.

== Career ==
Alam was elected to parliament from Comilla-15 as an Awami League candidate in 1973.
