= Abdul Hakim (Islamic scholar) =

Pakistani politician

Maulana Abdul Hakim MNA

Member of the National Assembly of Pakistan
- In office 1972–1977
- Constituency: NW-5 Hazara-I

Personal details
- Party: Jamiat Ulema-e-Islam (JUI)
- Occupation: Islamic scholar, Politician

Religious life
- Denomination: Sunni

Maulana Abdul Hakim is a Pakistani Islamic scholar and politician who served as a member of the 5th National Assembly of Pakistan from 14 April 1972 to 10 January 1977.
