= Ghulam Hussain (politician) =

Pakistani politician and doctor (born 1938)

Dr Ghulam Hussain

Secretary-General Pakistan Peoples Party (S.B)
- In office 1977–1985
- President: Fazal Ilahi Chaudhry
- Prime Minister: Zulfikar Ali Bhutto
- Preceded by: J. A. Rahim, Mubashir Hasan
- Succeeded by: General Tikka Khan

Federal Minister for Railways of Pakistan
- In office 1977–1977

Personal details
- Born: June 26, 1936 (age 90) Jhelum, Pakistan
- Party: Pakistan Peoples Party
- Spouse: Zarina Parvin (Late)
- Children: Nadeem Hussain; Uzma Hussain; Imran Hussain; Humaira Hussain; Saadia Hussain
- Website: Official Website

Ghulam Hussain is a Pakistani medical practitioner and politician. He got his bachelor of medicine degree in 1963 and worked as a general practitioner 1963–1972 and 1974–1977. He belongs to a Jatt family.

He was a close ally of Zulfiqar Ali Bhutto and the co-founder of the Pakistan Peoples Party, ex-General Secretary of the PPP, also one of the writers of Pakistan's first constitution in 1973.

He practised as a doctor in Mandi Bahauddin for some time and gained popularity for his charity work. He joined Zulfiqar Ali Bhutto and formed the Pakistan Peoples Party. He won election and became a member of the National Assembly of Pakistan (MNA) and later a minister.

He was arrested and exiled by Gen Zia-ul-Haq from Pakistan in the early 1980s.

== Childhood to mid-life ==
Hussain was born in the village of Jammarghal, union council Nakka Khurd, Tehsil & District Jhelum. His father was Haji Muhammed Akbar jutt and his mother Hajjan Rasul Bibi; they were both farmers. His parents had three sons and two daughters. The names of the sons are Ghulam Hussain, Ghulam Mustafa and Ghulam Ahmad. Ghulam Hussain has two sister, Ghulam Fatima and Late Fazil Bibi.

The boys attended school in the village of Chakri three miles away every day. Hussain graduated top of his middle school, Chakri Rajgaan Teh. Jhelum, in 1952, then matriculated from Muslim Model High School, Lahore. He finished his high school in 1954 and then joined Government College Lahore, where he gained a BSc in biology in 1958. He graduated with an MBBS from King Edward Medical College Lahore in 1963.

== Early career ==
He started medical practice at Mandi Bahauddin in 1963. Because this was the nearest town from his village. He used to visit his native area on every Friday and treated free of cost. He started to organize Kayssan Council of his native area in 1964.

Political offices
Member of National Assembly of Pakistan; 1970
Member of Constitution Committee of Pakistan; 1973
Member of National Health Committee of Pakistan; 1972–1972
Advisor to Governor of the Punjab; 1972–1974
Deputy Secretary-General of the PPP; 1972–1974
Member of the Delegation of Pakistan during Simla Accord; 1972–1972
Deputy Secretary General, PPP Punjab; 1972–1974
Reelected Member of National Assembly; 1977
Federal Minister for Railways of Pakistan; 1977
Party political offices |-	Secretary-General of Pakistan Peoples Party; 1977–1985
