= Tornadoes of 1969 =

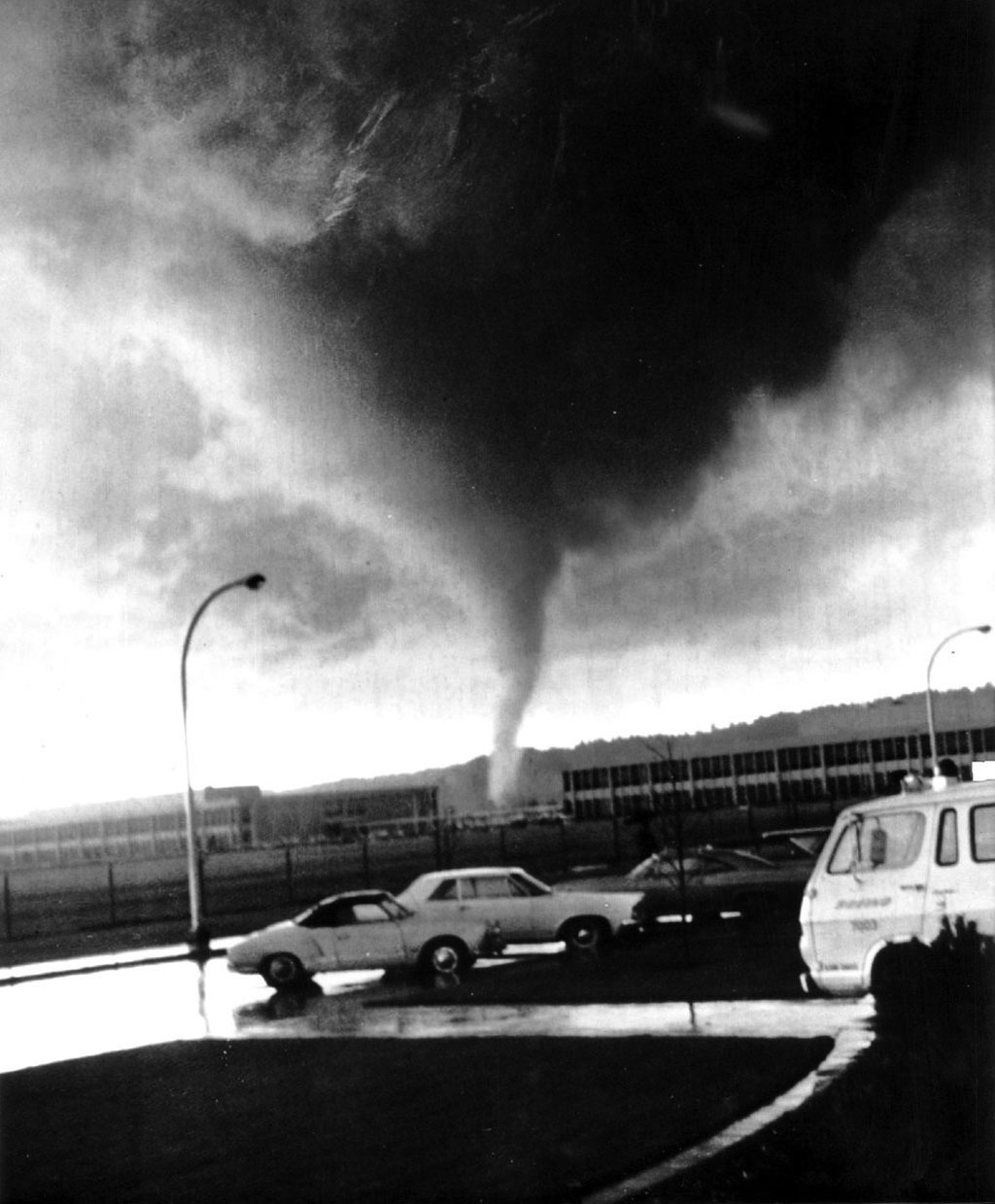
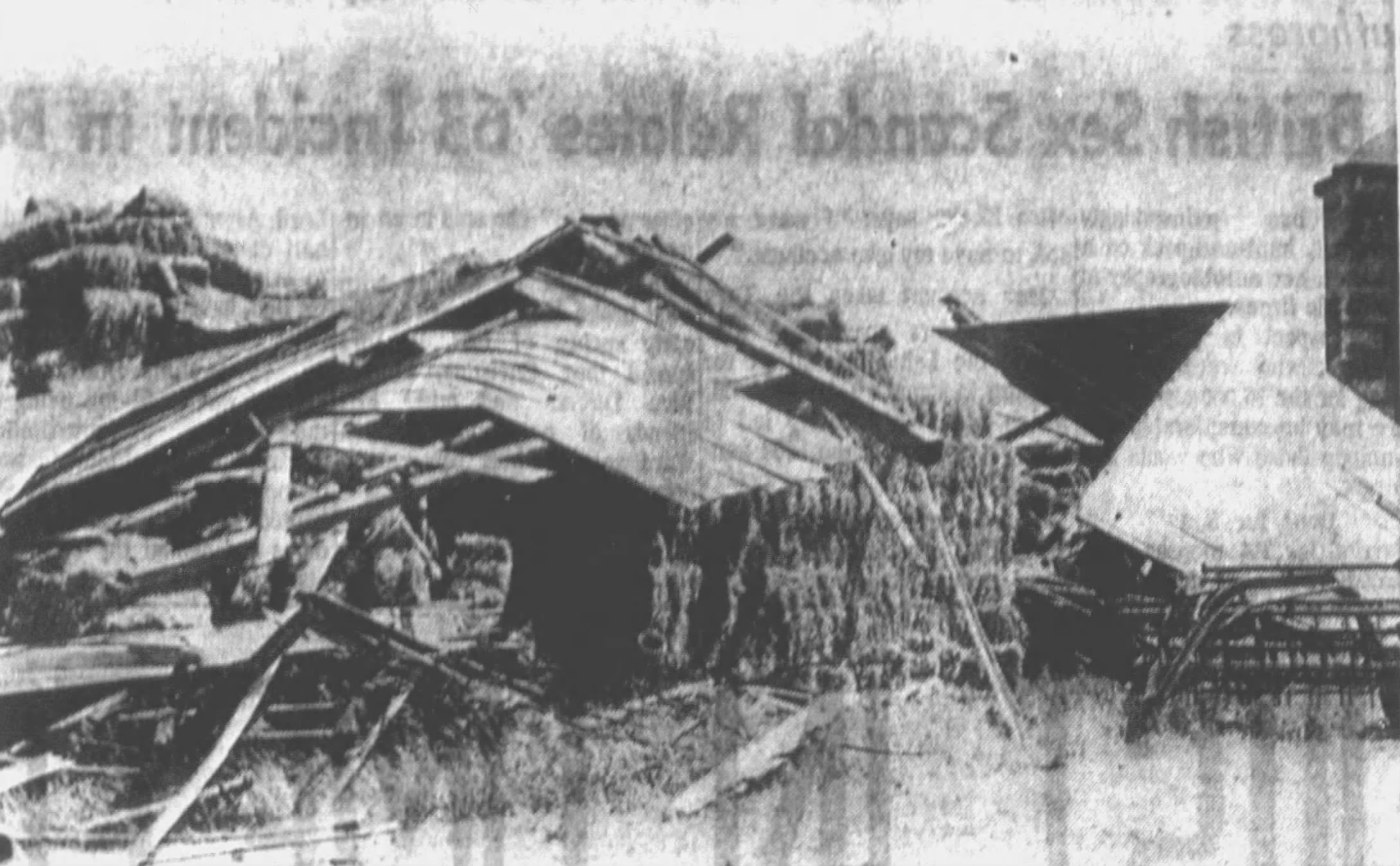
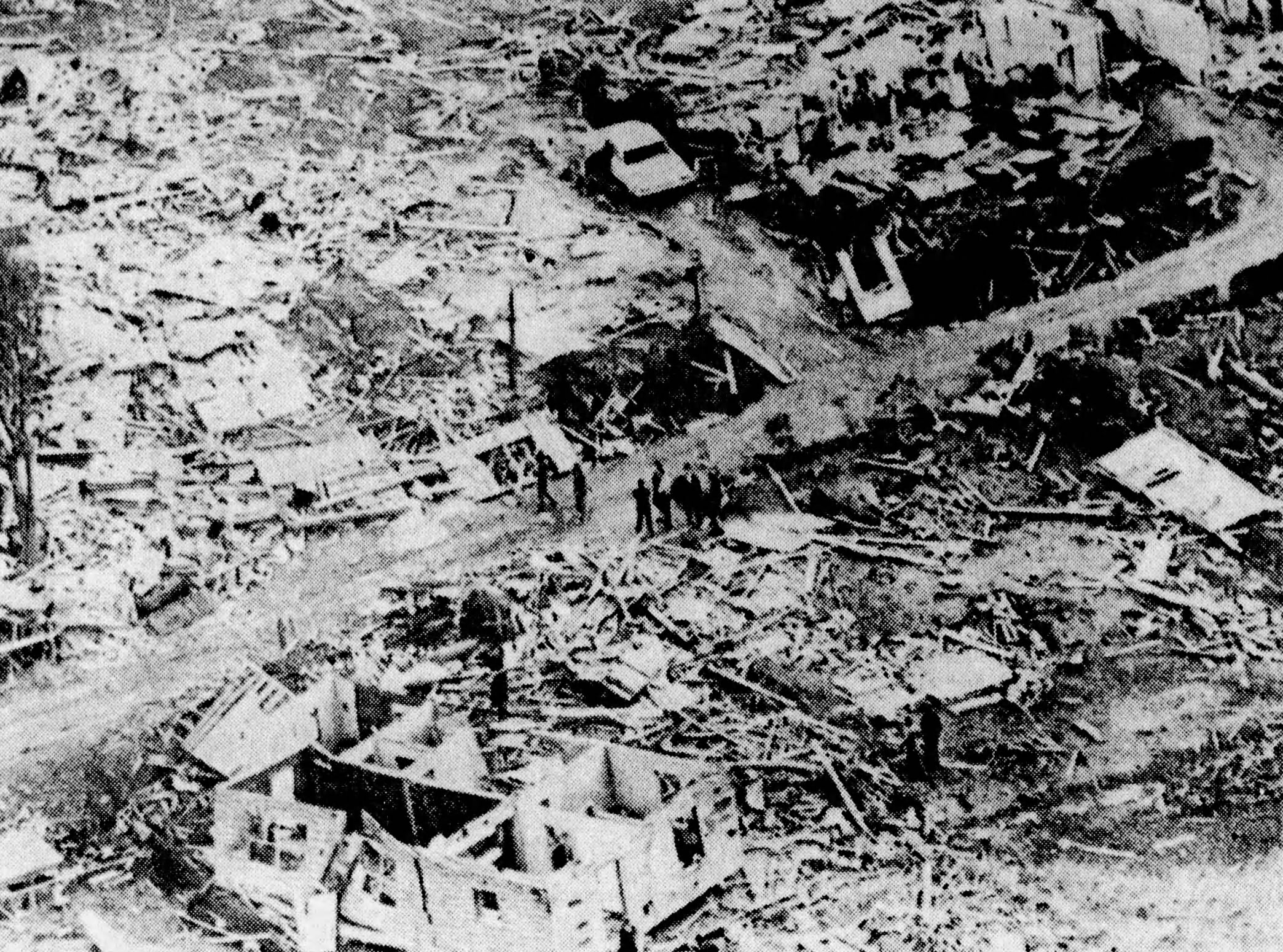
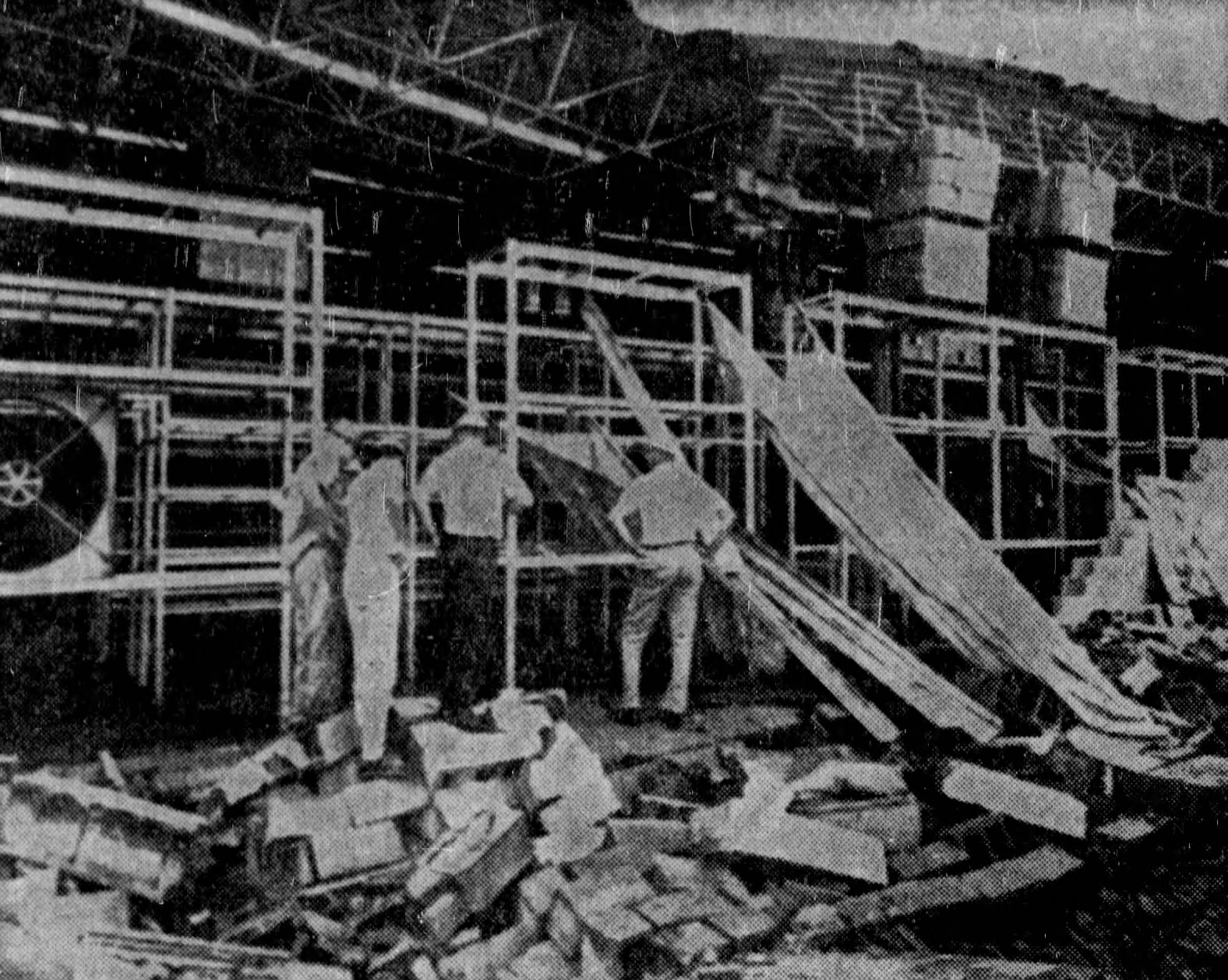
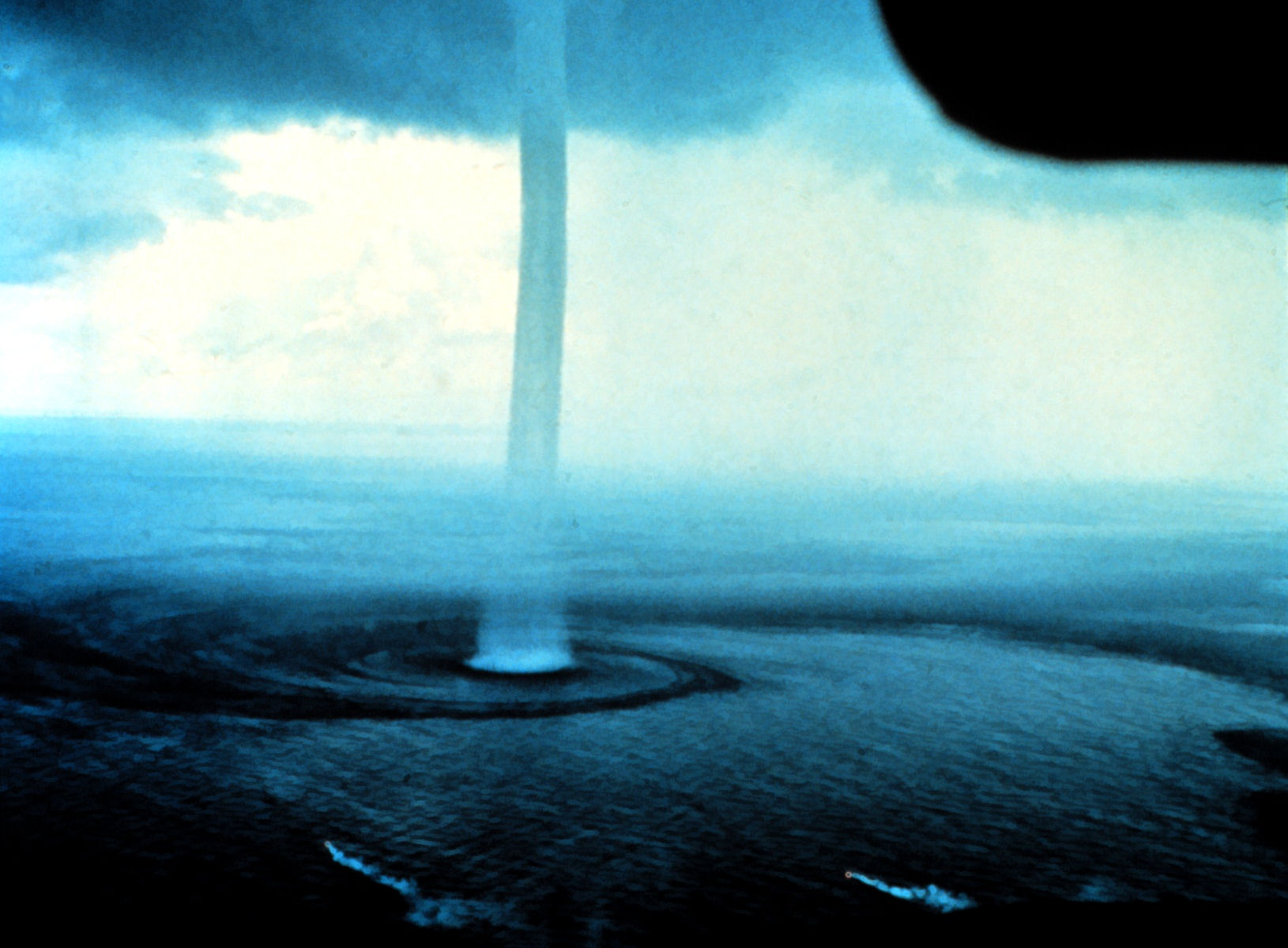
- Clockwise from top: An F3 tornado in Kent, Washington on December 12; An aerial of southern Hazlehurst, Mississippi after an F4 tornado on January 23; Damage to an industrial building in Garland, Texas after an F3 tornado on October 12; A waterspout off the Florida Keys on September 10; Damage along Lake Roosevelt, Minnesota after an F4 tornado on August 6; Damage to a barn near Pulaski, Wisconsin on June 26.
- Timespan: January 23–December 30, 1969
Maximum rated tornado
F4 tornado
- List
  – Hazlehurst, Mississippi
  on January 23
  – Danielsville, Alabama
  on April 18
  – Old Mines, Missouri
  on June 22
  – St. Francois County, Missouri
  on June 22
  – Goddard, Kansas
  on June 23
  – Harding County, South Dakota
  on July 7
  – Hill City, Minnesota
  on August 6
  – Cherkasy Oblast, Ukraine
  on August 18
  – Tianjin, China
  on August 29
- Tornadoes in U.S.: 608
- Damage (U.S.): Unknown
- Fatalities (U.S.): 66
- Fatalities (worldwide): ≥1231

This page documents the tornadoes and tornado outbreaks of 1969, primarily in the United States. Most tornadoes form in the U.S., although some events may take place internationally. Tornado statistics for older years like this often appear significantly lower than modern years due to fewer reports or confirmed tornadoes.

== Events ==
Fatal United States tornadoes in 1969
- Approximate touchdown location of killer tornadoes in 1969
Summary of tornadoes
- January 23 – Mississippi (32 deaths)
- March 24 – Virginia (1 death)
- April 18 – Alabama (2 deaths)
- May 8 – Ohio (1 death)
- May 27 – Texas (3 deaths)
- June 22 – Nebraska (1 death)
- June 22 – Missouri (2 deaths)
- June 22 – Missouri (4 deaths)
- August 6 – Minnesota (12 deaths)
- August 6 – Minnesota (1 death)
- August 6 – Minnesota (2 deaths)
- August 9 – Ohio (4 deaths)
- December 25 – Louisiana (1 death)
Total fatalities: 66

=== United States yearly total ===
Confirmed tornadoes by Fujita rating
FU	F0	F1	F2	F3	F4	F5	Total
0	195	218	139	49	7	0	608

== January ==
There were 3 confirmed tornadoes in the United States in January.

=== January 23 ===
FU	F0	F1	F2	F3	F4	F5
0	0	1	1	0	1	0

A series of at least three tornadoes impacted Mississippi, Tennessee, and Kentucky. A devastating F4 tornado traveled 105 miles (169 km) through Mississippi, killing 32 people and injuring 241. The worst damage was in Hazlehurst where 11 people died, 140 were injured, and 175 homes were damaged or destroyed. The community of Sardis was also destroyed, with 8 people killed. One school bus was carried and rolled a quarter mile while another was overturned, injuring 14 students. The tornado killed another 2 people south of Harrisville, and 10 people in 4 farm homes. In Rankin County the tornado leveled homes and tossed pickup trucks, but did not cause any deaths. An F2 tornado west of Dover, Tennessee destroyed 5 homes and 10 tobacco barns, injuring 3 people. An F1 tornado also touched down in Caldwell County, Kentucky.

== February ==
There were 5 confirmed tornadoes in the United States in February, all rated F0 or F1.

== March ==
There were 8 confirmed tornadoes in the United States in March.

=== March 23–24 ===
FU	F0	F1	F2	F3	F4	F5
0	1	4	1	2	0	0

An outbreak of scattered tornadoes impacted the eastern United States. On March 23, an F3 tornado in Hamshire, Texas destroyed two trailers, tore the roof from a house, and destroyed a gas station. The next day, another F3 (rated as F4 by Grazulis) tornado southeast of South Boston, Virginia completely destroyed a farm house, killing a child inside. A stable, barn and trailer were also destroyed.

== April ==
There were 68 confirmed tornadoes in the United States in April.

=== April 11–14 ===
FU	F0	F1	F2	F3	F4	F5
0	2	6	4	2	0	0

A series of tornadoes occurred along the Gulf Coast. On April 11, an F3 tornado south of Sargent, Texas injured 12-13 people and damaged or destroyed 61 beach houses and 117 trailers. Ten structures were thrown into the Gulf of Mexico as the tornado moved offshore. On April 12, another F3 tornado struck Galvez, Louisiana, where it heavily damaged a school, destroyed several trailers, and threw several other trailers off their blocks. Three F2 tornadoes struck Mississippi, the most significant of which produced a three-block-wide swath of damage through Mount Olive and injured 11 people.

=== April 14 (East Pakistan) ===
One of the deadliest tornadoes in history struck the northern suburbs of Dhaka, East Pakistan (now Bangladesh) killing 660 people. Another tornado in Homna Upazila killed 263 people.

=== April 17 (East Pakistan) ===
An outbreak of tornadoes struck East Pakistan. One tornado hit Khoksa and Kumarkhali, killing 15 people. Another tornado hit Rajshahi, killing 37 people. A third tornado hit Tangail, Sirajganj, and Mymensingh, killing 32 people.

=== April 18 ===
FU	F0	F1	F2	F3	F4	F5
0	0	5	5	4	1	0

A tornado outbreak impacted the southeastern United States. An F4 tornado killed two people and destroyed 30 homes in and near Danielsville, Alabama and traveled on a skipping path, destroying farm buildings near Ramer and seven more homes near Fitzpatrick. A tornado family, the strongest member of which was rated F3, traveled from near Hartsville, South Carolina to south of Fayetteville, North Carolina, unroofing homes, overturning trailers, destroying barns, and killing more than 1000 chickens. Another F3 tornado or tornado family tore roofs from buildings in Roseboro, North Carolina, destroyed a small home near Faison, and leveled a tobacco farm.

== May ==
There were 145 confirmed tornadoes in the United States in May.

=== May 8 ===
FU	F0	F1	F2	F3	F4	F5
0	1	6	2	2	0	0

An F3 tornado destroyed three frame homes and several cottages and trailers near Tappan Lake in Ohio, killing one person and injuring 21. Another F3 tornado injured 28 people in Kettering and Beaver Creek, Ohio as it destroyed 13 homes and severely damaged 63. Two F2 tornadoes touched down in Mississippi.

=== May 10 ===
FU	F0	F1	F2	F3	F4	F5
0	3	3	3	2	0	0

An outbreak produced several tornadoes in the Ohio River Valley region. Another F3 tornado destroyed 8 farm homes and damaged another 29 south of Shepherdsville, Kentucky, injuring 14 people. A third F3 tornado destroyed a home and caused other damage in Butler County, Ohio. A tornado family with a maximum rating of F2 destroyed eight homes and injured 12 people on the south side of Indianapolis. Homes in Manhattan and Valley Mills, Indiana. Another 7 people were injured when the roof of a department store collapsed. Two other F2 tornadoes damaged barns and homes in Indiana. One of them threw a woman over 200 yards (180 m), but she survived.

=== May 27 ===
A short-lived, but deadly F3 tornado lifted up and destroyed a small home east of Anahuac, Texas, killing three people inside.

== June ==
There were 137 confirmed tornadoes in the United States in June.

=== June 21–26 ===
FU	F0	F1	F2	F3	F4	F5
0	11	28	14	7	3	0

A tornado outbreak sequence caused significant tornado activity for six consecutive days in the Midwestern United States. The first significant tornado was an F3 storm on the evening of June 21 that severely damaged or destroyed more than 100 homes and businesses in Salina, Kansas, caused minor damage to more than 500, and injured 60 people. An F2 tornado in the early morning of June 22 destroyed a trailer and damaged homes and barns in Furnas County, Nebraska, killing one person. An F4 tornado in Missouri on June 22 touched down in Clark National Forest. Near the end of its path, the tornado destroyed 17 homes in and near the south side of Old Mines, killing two people. Another F4 tornado moved across St. Francois County, Missouri, completely destroying 22 homes and killing four people: two in a camper-bus that was swept off the road and two in a house that was leveled. On June 23 a third F4 tornado leveled several farm homes between Goddard and Wichita, Kansas and an F2 tornado damaged or destroyed 13 homes and killed livestock in Payne County, Oklahoma. On June 24 a long-tracked F3 tornado skipped across northern Kansas, completely destroying a farm near Penokee and two F2 tornadoes touched down in Nebraska. Five F1 tornadoes struck states east of the Mississippi River. On June 25, an F3 tornado struck Groton, South Dakota, injuring six people. On June 26, an F3 tornado destroyed a house and three barns in Grand Traverse County, Michigan. Damage to the house was near-F4. Two significant tornadoes struck near Kansas City, Missouri: An F3 tornado destroyed five homes and overturned trailers in Riverside and Gladstone, injuring 5 people; and an F2 tornado tore roofs from homes, a school, and a church in and near Platte Woods.

== July ==
There were 98 confirmed tornadoes in the United States in July.

=== July 4 ===
FU	F0	F1	F2	F3	F4	F5
0	0	3	2	1	0	0

A small tornado outbreak caused damage in Michigan and Ohio. An F3 tornado injured 44 people in and near Flat Rock, Michigan. One new home with only a single wall standing and a tile factory was destroyed, with debris carried more than 1 mile (1.6 km). An F2 tornado came ashore from Lake Erie near Perry, Ohio, destroying 4 homes and injuring 40 people. A boat was carried 0.75 mi (1.21 km).

=== July 7 ===
FU	F0	F1	F2	F3	F4	F5
0	0	1	1	0	1	0

An F2 tornado hit Mobridge, South Dakota causing extensive damage and flipping a brand new motor home. There were no casualties, but evacuees had to spend the night in a nearby Fire Hall. An additional F4 tornado also touched down in rural Harding County, South Dakota.

== August ==
There were 70 confirmed tornadoes in the United States in August.

=== August 6 ===
FU	F0	F1	F2	F3	F4	F5
0	2	0	3	7	1	0

An F4 tornado caused major damage to many cabins and wide swaths of forest on both sides of Lake Roosevelt in Outing, Minnesota.

Several major tornadoes struck northern Minnesota, killing at least 15 people. The worst damage of the outbreak was an F4 tornado that traveled from Stewart Lake to south of Hill City, killing at least 12 people, most of them at Roosevelt Lake. Thousands of trees, dozens of cabins, and many farms were leveled. An F3 tornado killed a person near Jacobson and another of the same intensity killed 2 people between Bouder Lake and Two Harbors. An F3 tornado near Backus destroyed several homes and barns, injuring 4 people.

=== August 8–10 ===
FU	F0	F1	F2	F3	F4	F5
0	6	5	6	2	0	0

A destructive F3 tornado tore through the northern suburbs of Cincinnati, Ohio, killing 4 people. Many buildings were "unroofed or torn apart" and more than 2500 homes were damaged, of which 27 were destroyed. Damages were estimated at $2.75 million (1969 USD). Another F3 tornado destroyed 5 homes and damaged 18 homes, a church, an apartment building, and a shopping center on the north side of Indianapolis, injuring 6 people.

=== August 11 ===
FU	F0	F1	F2	F3	F4	F5
0	0	1	0	0	0	0

A destructive F1 tornado hit the Southwestern Milwaukee suburb of West Allis, injuring 153 people.

=== August 18 (Ukraine) ===
FU	F0	F1	F2	F3	F4	F5
0	0	3	0	1	1	0

A violent albeit localized outbreak of 5 tornadoes struck central Ukraine on the evening of August 18th. At around 7 pm, a powerful F4 tornado devastated numerous villages along a 78 km (50 mi) path in Cherkasy and Kyiv Oblasts. The most severe damage was concentrated in villages of Tynivka, Berestivets, Kryvets, Antonivka, and Kovshevatiy. The small village of Kryvets was completely destroyed by the tornado. Further northeast, three F1 tornadoes occurred with first impacting Antonivka and other two impacting Kivshovata. One hour later, an F3 tornado struck Tarashcha and Kaharlyk in Kyiv Oblast. In all, five tornadoes were confirmed, none of which caused any injuries or fatalities.

=== August 23 (Japan) ===
A tornado in Sashima, Ibaraki Prefecture killed 2 people and injured 107.

=== August 28–29 (China) ===
FU	F0	F1	F2	F3	F4	F5
1	0	0	0	0	1	0

On August 28, 1969, an extremely violent tornado struck Tianjin. Large hail also fell in Beijing that day. The next day, a supercell produced one of the most violent tornadoes in Chinese history in Hebei Province That evening. The tornado first devastated a small city in the Province around 7:30 PM, where numerous structures were obliterated and 98 people died. The devastation was so complete that the village was never rebuilt. The tornado then struck Tianjin around 8:00 PM, where it killed 52 before it dissipated. The tornado leveled several reinforced concrete plants and debarked trees completely. The tornado was officially rated F4, though unofficial sources indicate possible F5 intensity.

== September ==
There were 20 confirmed tornadoes in the United States in September.

== October ==
There were 26 confirmed tornadoes in the United States in October.

== November ==
There were 5 confirmed tornadoes in the United States in November.

== December ==
There were 23 confirmed tornadoes in the United States in December.

=== December 22 (Cyprus) ===
Six waterspouts came ashore south of Nicosia, killing four people.

=== December 25 ===
FU	F0	F1	F2	F3	F4	F5
0	4	3	4	2	0	0

Tornadoes struck portions of southern Louisiana, Georgia, and northern Florida on Christmas Day. An F3 tornado killed a person and destroyed several homes on the outskirts of Kaplan, Louisiana. More homes were destroyed by another F3 tornado around White Castle, Louisiana.

== See also ==
- Tornado
  - Tornadoes by year
  - Tornado records
  - Tornado climatology
  - Tornado myths
- List of tornado outbreaks
  - List of F5 and EF5 tornadoes
  - List of North American tornadoes and tornado outbreaks
  - List of 21st-century Canadian tornadoes and tornado outbreaks
  - List of European tornadoes and tornado outbreaks
  - List of tornadoes and tornado outbreaks in Asia
  - List of Southern Hemisphere tornadoes and tornado outbreaks
  - List of tornadoes striking downtown areasv
- Tornado intensity
  - Fujita scale
  - Enhanced Fujita scale

== Notes ==
A.This tornado is listed by Grazulis but does not appear in official records.
