= List of F4 tornadoes (1960–1969) =

This is a list of tornadoes which have been officially or unofficially labeled as F4 in the 1960s. The Fujita scale attempts to estimate the intensity of a tornado by classifying the damage caused to natural features and man-made structures in the tornado's path.

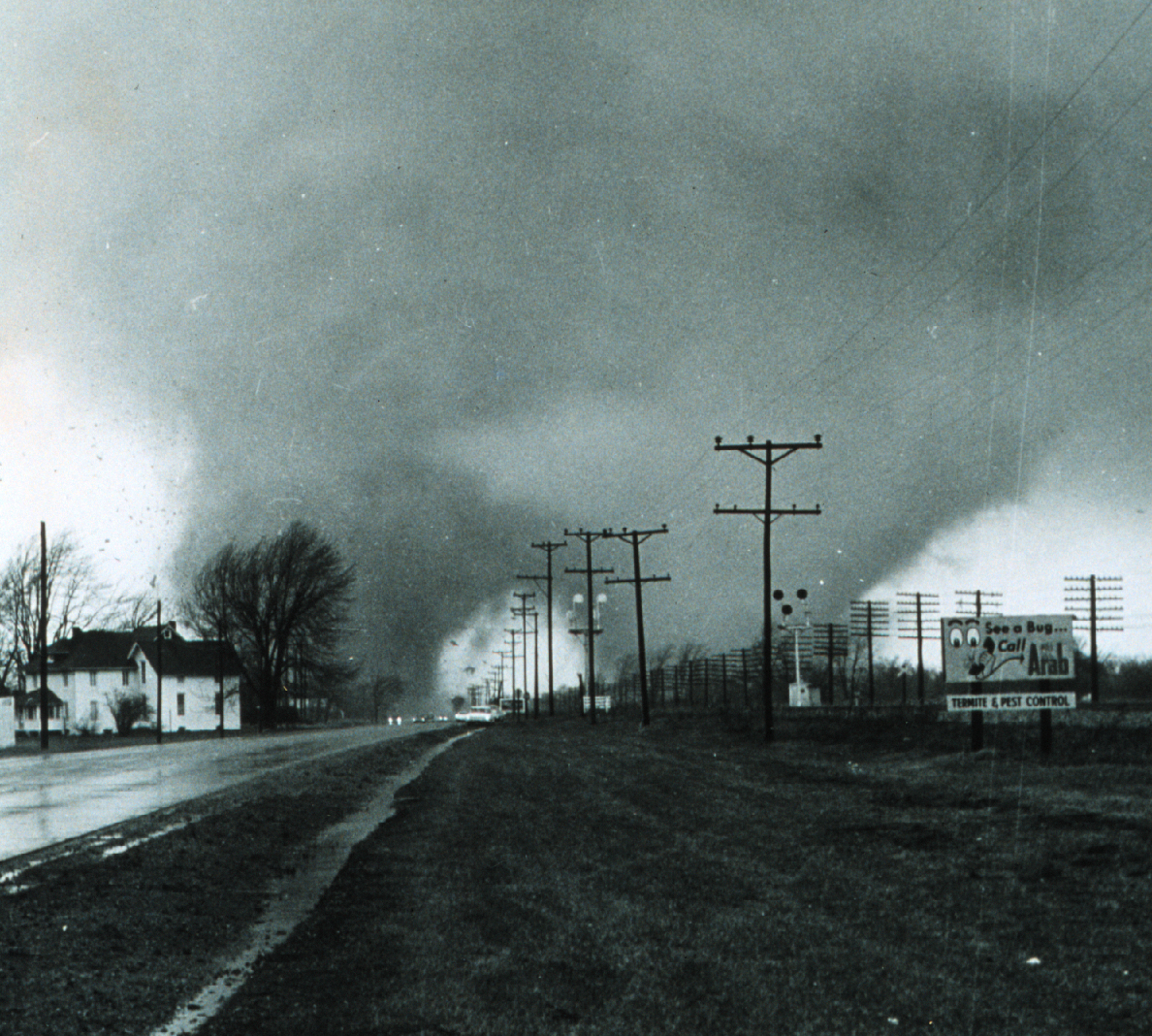
A famous photo of an F4 tornado in the 1965 Palm Sunday tornado outbreak.

Tornadoes are among the most violent known meteorological phenomena. Each year, more than 2,000 tornadoes are recorded worldwide, with the vast majority occurring in North America and Europe. To assess the intensity of these events, meteorologist Ted Fujita devised a method to estimate maximum wind speeds within tornadic storms based on the damage caused; this became known as the Fujita scale. The scale ranks tornadoes from F0 to F5, with F0 being the least intense and F5 being the most intense. F4 tornadoes were estimated to have had maximum winds between 207 mph (333 km/h) and 260 mph (420 km/h). (Note: The winds estimated by the Fujita Scale are estimated values and have not been verified scientifically.)

Most of Europe also uses the TORRO tornado intensity scale (or T-Scale), which ranks tornado intensity between T0 and T11; F4 tornadoes are approximately equivalent to T8 to T9 on the T-Scale.

== List ==
Tornadoes officially rated F4
Day	Year	Country	Subdivision	Location	Fatalities	Notes	Rated by
May 4	1960	United States	Oklahoma	Pottawatomie County, Seminole County	0	May 1960 tornado outbreak sequence –	NWS
May 4	1960	United States	Oklahoma	Soper	0 (3 Injuries)	May 1960 tornado outbreak sequence –	NWS
May 5	1960	United States	Oklahoma	Wilburton, McCurtain, Keota, Sallisaw	16 (106 Injuries)	May 1960 tornado outbreak sequence –	NWS
May 5	1960	United States	Oklahoma	Roland	5 (13 Injuries)	May 1960 tornado outbreak sequence –	NWS
May 19	1960	United States	Kansas	Wabaunsee, St. Marys,	0 (12 Injuries)		NWS
May 19	1960	United States	Kansas	Ozawkie	1 (92 Injuries)		NWS
May 20	1960	Poland	Subcarpathia	Niechobrz	3		ESSL
April 25	1961	United States	Indiana, Ohio	Boston (IN), Eaton (OH)	0 (7 Injuries)	Tornado outbreak sequence of April 23–30, 1961 –	NWS
May 5	1961	United States	Oklahoma	Howe	16 (58 Injuries)	Tornado outbreak sequence of May 3–9, 1961 –	NWS
May 7	1961	United States	Kansas, Missouri	Kansas City (KS), Waldron (MO), Weatherby Lake (MO), Kansas City (MO), Liberty (MO)	0 (12 Injuries)	Tornado outbreak sequence of May 3–9, 1961 –	NWS
May 30	1961	United States	Nebraska	Anselmo, Sargent, Ord	0		NWS
June 29	1961	United States	Montana	Glendive	0 (1 Injury)	This is the only officially rated F4/EF4 tornado ever recorded in Montana.	NWS
September 1	1961	United States	Iowa	Bristow, Plainfield	0 (7 Injuries)		NWS
September 12	1961	United States	Texas	Galveston	8 (200 Injuries)	Hurricane Carla tornado outbreak – One of only two F4 tornadoes of ever produced by a tropical cyclone. 200 buildings suffered severe damage, including 60–75 that were destroyed, with several homes leveled, although hurricane-force winds may have weakened the structures beforehand.	NWS
May 25	1962	United States	Oklahoma	Dill City	0 (9 Injuries)	Tornado outbreak sequence of May 14 – June 1, 1962 –	NWS
May 26	1962	United States	Oklahoma	Cotton County	0 (1 Injury)	Tornado outbreak sequence of May 14 – June 1, 1962 –	NWS
May 26	1962	United States	Texas	Haskell	0 (1 Injury)	Tornado outbreak sequence of May 14 – June 1, 1962 –	NWS
May 29	1962	United States	Nebraska	Holt County, Boyd County	0	Tornado outbreak sequence of May 14 – June 1, 1962 – The F4 rating of this tornado is questionable as Storm Data lists the event as numerous funnel clouds observed in multiple counties with three brief tornado touchdowns over open country that caused no damage. The tornado was not rated as significant (F2+) by Grazulis.	NWS
August 6	1962	United States	Kansas	Holton	0 (3 Injuries)		NWS
September 16	1962	United States	Minnesota	Rochester	0 (34 Injuries)		NWS
March 5	1963	United States	Alabama	Bessemer, Homewood, Mountain Brook	0 (35 Injuries)		NWS
March 11	1963	United States	Alabama	Good Hope, Phelan, Berlin, Fairview	2 (6 Injuries)		NWS
March 11	1963	United States	Mississippi	French Camp	2 (7 Injuries)		NWS
April 17	1963	United States	Illinois, Indiana	Bourbonnais (IL), Bradley (IL), Medaryville (IN)	1 (70 Injuries)		NWS
April 29	1963	United States	Mississippi	Shannon	3 (20 Injuries)		NWS
January 24	1964	United States	Alabama	Harpersville	10 (6 Injuries)		NWS
March 4	1964	United States	Kentucky	Calloway County, Marshall County	3 (24 Injuries)		NWS
April 12	1964	United States	Kansas	Greeley	3 (9 Injuries)		NWS
April 12	1964	United States	Iowa	Page County	1 (28 Injuries)		NWS
May 5	1964	United States	Nebraska	Primrose, Petersburg, Raeville	0 (11 Injuries)		NWS
May 8	1964	United States	Michigan	New Baltimore	11 (224 Injuries)		NWS
June 22	1964	United States	Iowa	Fremont County, Page County	0		NWS
August 22	1964	United States	Wisconsin	Port Washington	0 (30 Injuries)		NWS
August 29	1964	United States	Iowa	Kossuth County	0 (2 Injuries)		NWS
October 3	1964	United States	Louisiana	Larose	22 (165 Injuries)	Hurricane Hilda tornado outbreak – One of only two F4 tornadoes of ever produced by a tropical cyclone.	NWS
March 16	1965	United States	Oklahoma, Kansas	Grant County (OK), Kay County (OK), Sumner County (KS), Cowley County (KS)	0 (7 Injuries)		NWS
April 10	1965	United States	Arkansas	Conway	6 (200 Injuries)	1965 Palm Sunday tornado outbreak –	NWS
April 11	1965	United States	Iowa, Wisconsin	Lowden, Epworth	1	1965 Palm Sunday tornado outbreak –	NWS
April 11	1965	United States	Wisconsin	Grant County	0 (3 Injuries)	1965 Palm Sunday tornado outbreak –	NWS
April 11	1965	United States	Illinois	Lakewood, Crystal Lake, Prairie Grove, Island Lake	6 (75 Injuries)	1965 Palm Sunday tornado outbreak –	NWS
April 11	1965	United States	Michigan	Walker, Rockford	5 (142 Injuries)	1965 Palm Sunday tornado outbreak –	NWS
April 11	1965	United States	Indiana	Wakarusa, Goshen, Dunlap	31 (252 Injuries)	1965 Palm Sunday tornado outbreak –	NWS
April 11	1965	United States	Indiana	Elkhart County, LaGrange County	5 (41 Injuries)	1965 Palm Sunday tornado outbreak –	NWS
April 11	1965	United States	Indiana, Michigan	Orland (IN), Hillsdale (MI), Tecumseh (MI)	23 (294 Injuries)	1965 Palm Sunday tornado outbreak –	NWS
April 11	1965	United States	Indiana	Tippeacanoe County, Clinton County	0 (44 Injuries)	1965 Palm Sunday tornado outbreak –	NWS
April 11	1965	United States	Indiana	Elkhart, Dunlap	36 (321 Injuries)	1965 Palm Sunday tornado outbreak –	NWS
April 11	1965	United States	Indiana	Russiaville, Kokomo, Greentown, Swayzee, Marion	25 (835 Injuries)	1965 Palm Sunday tornado outbreak –	NWS
April 11	1965	United States	Michigan	Hillsdale, Tecumseh	21 (293 Injuries)	1965 Palm Sunday tornado outbreak –	NWS
April 11	1965	United States	Indiana	Montgomery County, Boone County, Hamilton County	28 (123 Injuries)	1965 Palm Sunday tornado outbreak –	NWS
April 11	1965	United States	Indiana, Ohio	Berne (IN)	4 (125 Injuries)	1965 Palm Sunday tornado outbreak –	NWS
April 11	1965	United States	Michigan	Clinton County, Shiawassee County	1 (8 Injuries)	1965 Palm Sunday tornado outbreak –	NWS
April 11	1965	United States	Ohio	Cairo	13 (104 Injuries)	1965 Palm Sunday tornado outbreak –	NWS
April 11	1965	United States	Ohio, Michigan	Toledo (OH)	18 (236 Injuries)	1965 Palm Sunday tornado outbreak –	NWS
April 11	1965	United States	Ohio	Fort Loramie	3 (50 Injuries)	1965 Palm Sunday tornado outbreak –	NWS
April 11	1965	United States	Ohio	Grafton, Strongsville	18 (200 Injuries)	1965 Palm Sunday tornado outbreak –	NWS
May 5	1965	United States	Iowa	Callender	0	Early May 1965 tornado outbreak –	NWS
May 5	1965	United States	Iowa	Osage	0 (11 Injuries)	Early May 1965 tornado outbreak –	NWS
May 6	1965	United States	Minnesota	St. Bonifacius, Minnetrista	3 (175 Injuries)	Early May 1965 tornado outbreak –	NWS
May 6	1965	United States	Minnesota	Chanhassen, Deephaven	0	Early May 1965 tornado outbreak –	NWS
May 6	1965	United States	Minnesota	Minneapolis, Columbia Heights, Fridley, Spring Lake Park, Blaine	3 (175 Injuries)	Early May 1965 tornado outbreak –	NWS
May 6	1965	United States	Minnesota	Golden Valley, Robbinsdale, Minneapolis, Columbia Heights, Fridley, Mounds View, Shoreview, Blaine, Lexington, Circle Pines, Lino Lakes	6 (158 Injuries)	Early May 1965 tornado outbreak –	NWS
May 8	1965	United States	Nebraska	Greeley Center	0	Early May 1965 tornado outbreak –	NWS
May 8	1965	United States	Nebraska	Primrose, Wausa	4 (53 Injuries)	Early May 1965 tornado outbreak –	NWS
June 2	1965	United States	Texas	Hale Center	4 (76 Injuries)		NWS
June 7	1965	United States	South Dakota	Turner County	1		NWS
July 4	1965	Italy	Emilia-Romagna, Lombardy		3 (80 Injuries)		ESSL
August 26	1965	United States	Iowa	Black Hawk County, Benton County	1 (17 Injuries)		NWS
April 4	1966	United States	Florida	Largo, Clearwater, Tampa, Temple Terrace, Lakeland, Cocoa	11 (530 Injuries)	Tornado outbreak of April 4–5, 1966 –	NWS
April 27	1966	United States	Oklahoma	Johnston County, Atoka County	0 (2 Injuries)		NWS
June 8	1966	United States	Kansas	Lansing	1 (2 Injuries)	Tornado outbreak sequence of June 1966 –	NWS
June 11	1966	United States	Minnesota	Jenkins, Crosslake	0	Tornado outbreak sequence of June 1966 –	NWS
January 24	1967	United States	Missouri, Iowa	Schuyler County (MO), Scotland County (MO), Davis County (IA)	0 (2 Injuries)	1967 St. Louis tornado outbreak –	NWS
January 24	1967	United States	Missouri	Chesterfield, Maryland Heights, Bridgeton, St. Ann, Berkeley, Ferguson	3 (216 Injuries)	1967 St. Louis tornado outbreak –	NWS
March 6	1967	United States	Alabama	Dora, Sumiton, Warrior	2 (25 Injuries)		NWS
April 21	1967	United States	Missouri	Bucklin, Atlanta	0 (2 Injuries)	1967 Oak Lawn tornado outbreak –	NWS
April 21	1967	United States	Illinois	Belvidere, Woodstock	24 (450 Injuries)	1967 Belvidere tornado –	NWS
April 21	1967	United States	Illinois	Algonquin, Barrington Hills, Fox River Grove, Lake Barrington, North Barrington, Lake Zurich	1 (100 Injuries)	1967 Oak Lawn tornado outbreak –	NWS
April 21	1967	United States	Illinois	Palos Park, Palos Heights, Worth, Alsip, Oak Lawn, Chicago	33 (500 Injuries)	1967 Oak Lawn tornado outbreak –	NWS
April 21	1967	United States	Michigan	Westphalia	0 (8 Injuries)	1967 Oak Lawn tornado outbreak –	NWS
April 30	1967	United States	Iowa	Worth County, Mitchell County	0	Tornado outbreak of April 30 – May 2, 1967 –	NWS
April 30	1967	United States	Iowa, Minnesota	Worth County (IA), Freeborn County (MN)	0 (1 Injury)	Tornado outbreak of April 30 – May 2, 1967 –	NWS
April 30	1967	United States	Minnesota	Albert Lea, Owatonna	5 (35 Injuries)	Tornado outbreak of April 30 – May 2, 1967 –	NWS
April 30	1967	United States	Minnesota	New Richland, Waseca	6 (22 Injuries)	Tornado outbreak of April 30 – May 2, 1967 –	NWS
June 8	1967	United States	Iowa	Fort Dodge	0		NWS
June 10	1967	United States	Oklahoma	Roger Mills County, Custer County	4 (1 Injury)		NWS
June 10	1967	United States	Oklahoma	Blaine County	0		NWS
June 24	1967	France	Hauts-de-France		2 (50 Injuries)		ESSL
December 2	1967	United States	Mississippi	Scott County	2 (10 Injuries)		NWS
December 21	1967	United States	Missouri	Potosi	3 (52 Injuries)		NWS
April 3	1968	United States	Arkansas	Star City	5 (16 Injuries)		NWS
April 3	1968	United States	Kentucky	Murray, Kentucky	2 (30 Injuries)		NWS
April 19	1968	United States	Arkansas	Greenwood	14 (270 Injuries)		NWS
April 23	1968	United States	Kentucky, Ohio	Falmouth (KY), Dover (KY), Ripley (OH), Lucasville (OH)	6 (364 Injuries)	Tornado outbreak of April 21-24, 1968 –	NWS
April 23	1968	United States	Ohio	Clermont County, Brown County, Clinton County	1 (33 Injuries)	Tornado outbreak of April 21-24, 1968 –	NWS
May 15	1968	United States	Arkansas	Oil Trough	7 (24 Injuries)	Tornado outbreak of May 1968 –	NWS
May 15	1968	United States	Arkansas	Jonesboro, Manila	35 (364 Injuries)	Tornado outbreak of May 1968 –	NWS
July 10	1968	Germany	Baden-Württemberg	Marxzell, Karlsbad, Keltern, Birkenfeld, Pforzheim, Wurmberg, Wiernsheim, Mönsheim	2 (300 Injuries)		ESSL
August 19	1968	United States	Wisconsin	Coleman, Peshtigo	2 (3 Injuries)		NWS
January 23	1969	United States	Mississippi	Hazlehurst	32 (241 Injuries)	1969 Hazlehurst, Mississippi tornadoes –	NWS
April 18	1969	United States	Alabama	Greenville	2 (14 Injuries)		NWS
June 22	1969	United States	Missouri	Crawford County, Washington County	2 (22 Injuries)		NWS
June 22	1969	United States	Missouri	St. Francois	4 (14 Injuries)		NWS
June 23	1969	United States	Kansas	Sedgwick County	0 (6 Injuries)		NWS
July 7	1969	United States	South Dakota	Harding County	0		NWS
August 6	1969	United States	Minnesota	Fifty Lakes, Hill City	12 (70 Injuries)	Tornado outbreak of August 6, 1969 –	NWS
August 18	1969	Ukraine	Cherkasy Oblast, Kyiv Oblast	Kivshovata			

== See also ==
- Tornado intensity and damage
- List of tornadoes and tornado outbreaks
- List of F5 and EF5 tornadoes
- List of F4 and EF4 tornadoes
  - List of F4 and EF4 tornadoes (1950–1959)
  - List of F4 and EF4 tornadoes (2000–2009)
  - List of F4 and EF4 tornadoes (2010–2019)
  - List of F4 and EF4 tornadoes (2020–present)
- List of tornadoes striking downtown areas
- Tornado myths
