= Comilla-2 =

Constituency of Bangladesh's Jatiya Sangsad

Coordinates: 23.68°N 90.78°E

- Constituency for the Jatiya Sangsad
- District: Comilla District
- Division: Chittagong Division
- Electorate: 375,067 (2026)

Current constituency
- Created: 1973
- Party: Bangladesh Nationalist Party
- Member: Salim Bhuiyan
- ← 249 Comilla-1 251 Comilla-3 →

Comilla-2 is a constituency represented in the Jatiya Sangsad (National Parliament) of Bangladesh since 2026 by Salim Bhuiyan of the Bangladesh Nationalist Party.

== Boundaries ==
The constituency encompasses Homna and Titas upazilas.

== History ==
The constituency was created for the first general elections in newly independent Bangladesh, held in 1973.

Ahead of the 2008 general election, the Election Commission redrew constituency boundaries to reflect population changes revealed by the 2001 Bangladesh census. The 2008 redistricting altered the boundaries of the constituency.

== Members of Parliament ==
Election	Member	Party
1973	Taher Uddin Thakur	Awami League
1979	Md. Faridul Huda	Bangladesh Nationalist Party
Major Boundary Changes
1986	Abdur Rashid	Jatiya Party
1991	Khandokar Mosharraf Hossain	Bangladesh Nationalist Party
Jun 1996	Khandokar Mosharraf Hossain	Bangladesh Nationalist Party
2001	Khandokar Mosharraf Hossain	Bangladesh Nationalist Party
2008	M. K. Anwar	Bangladesh Nationalist Party
2014	Mohammed Amir Hossain	Jatiya Party (Ershad)
2018	Selima Ahmad	Awami League
2024	Abdul Majid	Independent
2024	Salim Bhuiyan	Bangladesh Nationalist Party

== Elections ==
=== Elections in the 2020s ===
General election 2026: Comilla-2
Party	Candidate	Votes	%	±%
BNP	Salim Bhuiyan	77,037		N/A
Independent	Md. Abdul Matin	63,045		N/A
Jamaat	Md. Nazim Uddin Molla	53,384		N/A
Majority		13,992		N/A
Turnout				N/A
BNP gain from AL				

=== Elections in the 2010s ===
Mohammed Amir Hossain was elected unopposed in the 2014 general election after opposition parties withdrew their candidacies in a boycott of the election.

=== Elections in the 2000s ===
General Election 2008: Comilla-2
Party	Candidate	Votes	%	±%
BNP	M. K. Anwar	94,105	53.7	−7.1
AL	Md. Abdul Majid	76,666	43.8	+18.0
IAB	Rafiqul Islam	1,807	1.0	N/A
Independent	Md. Monowar Hossain	1,802	1.0	N/A
PDP	Md. Golam Mostafa	811	0.5	N/A
Majority		17,439	10.0	−25.0
Turnout		175,191	83.4	+21.2
BNP hold				

General Election 2001: Comilla-2
Party	Candidate	Votes	%	±%
BNP	Khandokar Mosharraf Hossain	128,680	60.8	+16.8
AL	Hasan Jamil Sattar	54,651	25.8	+15.2
Independent	Mohammad Shubid Ali Bhuiyan	25,012	11.8	N/A
IJOF	Jahed Al Mahmud	2,336	1.1	N/A
Independent	Md. Shahid Ullah Sarkar	462	0.2	N/A
Gano Forum	Ayesha Begum	341	0.2	N/A
Jatiya Party (M)	Sohel Sarkar	248	0.1	N/A
Majority		74,029	35.0	+32.0
Turnout		211,730	62.2	−5.4
BNP hold				

=== Elections in the 1990s ===
General Election June 1996: Comilla-2
Party	Candidate	Votes	%	±%
BNP	Khandokar Mosharraf Hossain	69,175	44.0	−13.7
JP(E)	Hasan Jamil Sattar	64,461	41.0	+39.5
AL	Abdur Rashid	16,712	10.6	−2.1
Jamaat	A.B.M.A. Momin Sarkar	4,461	2.8	−2.6
IOJ	Rafiqul Islam	1,605	1.0	N/A
Independent	S. A. Hashem	430	0.3	N/A
Independent	Md. Mohsin Bhuiyan	393	0.2	N/A
Majority		4,714	3.0	−42.0
Turnout		157,237	67.6	+26.6
BNP hold				

General Election 1991: Comilla-2
Party	Candidate	Votes	%	±%
BNP	Khandokar Mosharraf Hossain	57,706	57.7	
AL	Badal Kumar Roy	12,699	12.7	
Independent	Abdur Rashid	12,076	12.1	
Zaker Party	Md. Tofazzal Hossain	6,037	6.0	
Jamaat	Md. A. Latif	5,413	5.4	
Independent	Kh. Mohiuddin	3,076	3.1	
JP(E)	Matiur Rahman	1,524	1.5	
Bangladesh Janata Party	Milan	876	0.9	
FP	A. Latif Shikder	543	0.5	
Majority		45,007	45.0	
Turnout		99,950	41.0	
BNP gain from JP(E)				
