= Titas Upazila =

Titas তিতাস
- Upazila
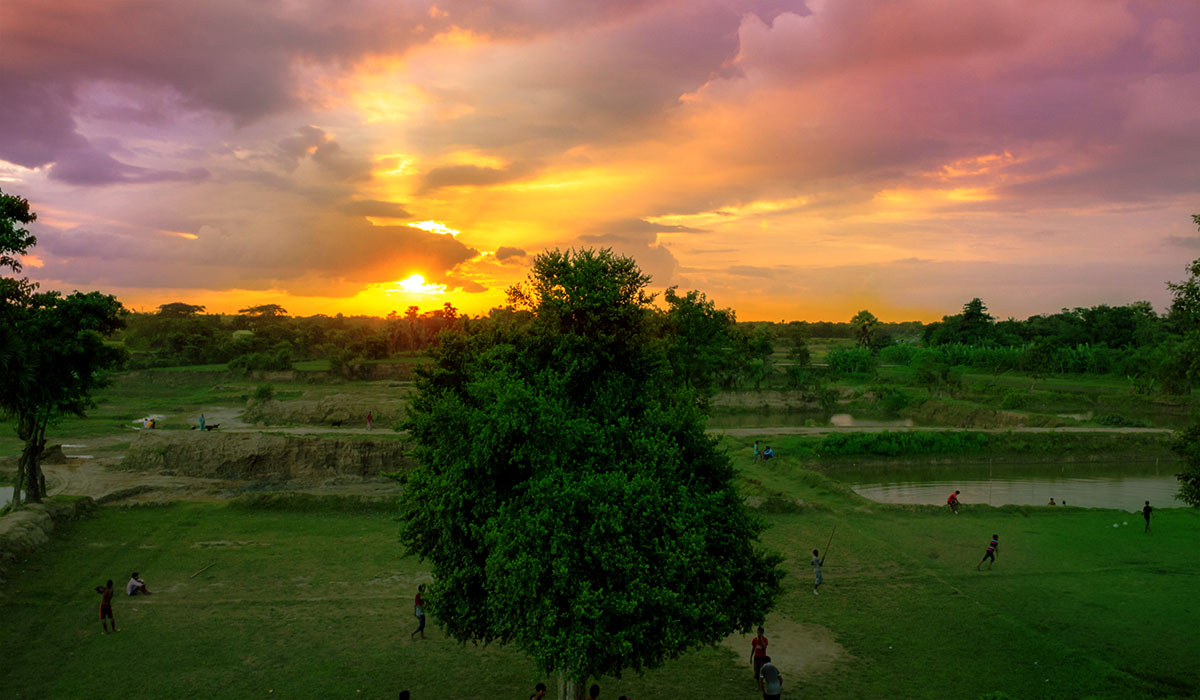
- Gumti River at Titas Upazila

- Coordinates: 23°36′N 90°46′E
- Country: Bangladesh
- Division: Chittagong
- District: Comilla

Area
  - Total: 125.74 km^{2} (48.55 sq mi)

Population (2022)
  - Total: 203,953
  - Density: 1,622.0/km^{2} (4,201.0/sq mi)
- Time zone: UTC+6 (BST)
- Website: titas.comilla.gov.bd

Titas Upazila mauza geocode map

Titas (Bengali: তিতাস) is an upazila of Comilla District in the Division of Chittagong, Bangladesh. This upazila was formerly under Daudkandi upazila. In 2005, it has been made a entirely new upazila.

== History ==
Titas was created in 2004. It split with nine Unions from Daudkandi Upazila. The name Titas named after the river Titas. Then minister and local MP Khandaker Mosharraf Hossain proposed the name.

== Location ==
It has Homna Upazila of Comilla District on the north, Daudkandi Upazila on the south, Muradnagar Upazila on the east and Meghna Upazila on the west.

== Demographics ==
Religions in Titas Upazila (2022)
Religion	Percent
Islam	96.78%
Hinduism	3.21%

According to the 2022 Bangladeshi census, Titas Upazila had 47,599 households and a population of 203,953. 10.90% of the population were under 5 years of age. Titas had a literacy rate (age 7 and over) of 65.17%: 65.94% for males and 64.56% for females, and a sex ratio of 83.79 males for every 100 females. 9,267 (4.54%) lived in urban areas.

According to the 2011 Census of Bangladesh, Titas Upazila had 36,068 households and a population of 184,617. 47,650 (25.81%) were under 10 years of age. Meghna has a literacy rate (age 7 and over) of 43.04%, compared to the national average of 51.8%, and a sex ratio of 1120 females per 1000 males. 3,532 (1.91%) lived in urban areas.

== Administration ==
Titas Upazila is divided into nine union parishads:Balorampur, Jagatpur, Kalakandi, Karikandi, Majidpur, Narayandia, Satani, Vitikandi, Zearkandi. The union parishads are subdivided into 61 mauzas and 138 villages.

== Notable residents ==
- Ferdous Ahmed, actor, was born in Kapaskandi in 1973.
- Md. Tafazzul Islam, chief justice of Bangladesh (2009–2010), was born in Lalpur in 1943.

== See also ==
- Upazilas of Bangladesh
- Districts of Bangladesh
- Divisions of Bangladesh
