= Mohammad Mobarak Ali =

Bangladeshi politician

- মোহাম্মদ মোবারক আলী

Member of Bangladesh Parliament
- In office 1986–1990
- Preceded by: Chhattar Bhuiyan
- Succeeded by: M. K. Anwar

Personal details
- Party: Jatiya Party (Ershad)

Mohammad Mobarak Ali is a Jatiya Party (Ershad) politician and a former member of parliament for Comilla-1.

== Career ==
Ali was elected to parliament from Comilla-1 as a Jatiya Party candidate in 1986 and 1988.
