= Maniker Char =

- Union
- Location in Bangladesh
- Coordinates: 23°10′N 91°12′E
- Country: Bangladesh
- Division: Chittagong Division
- District: Comilla District
- Upazilas: Meghna Upazila

Area
  - Total: 10.09 km^{2} (3.90 sq mi)

Population (2001)
  - Total: 11,659
- Time zone: UTC+6 (BST)
- Website: meghna.comilla.gov.bd

Maniker Char is a union, the smallest administrative body of Bangladesh, located in Meghna Upazila, Comilla District, Bangladesh. The total population is 11,659.
