= Salim Bhuiyan =

Bangladeshi politician

Md. Selim Bhuiyan

Members of Parliament
- Incumbent
- Assumed office 17 February 2026
- Preceded by: Abdul Majeed
- Constituency: Comilla-2

Personal details
- Party: Bangladesh Nationalist Party
- Occupation: Politician

Md. Selim Bhuiyan is a Bangladeshi politician of the Bangladesh Nationalist Party. He is an elected Member of Parliament from the Comilla-2 constituency.
