= Stewart Lake =

Stewart Lake may refer to:

- Stewart Lake (Minnesota), a lake in Crow Wing County
- Stewart Lake (Granite County, Montana), one of Granite County's lakes
- Stewart Lake (New York), a lake in Fulton County
- Stewart Lake National Wildlife Refuge, a protected area in North Dakota
