= Majidpur Union =

Majidpur Union may refer to:

- Majidpur Union, Keshabpur, a union in Keshabpur Upazila
- Majidpur Union, Titas, a union in Titas Upazila
