= M. K. Anwar =

Bangladeshi politician

- এম কে আনোয়ার

Minister of Agriculture
- In office 22 May 2003 – 29 October 2006
- Preceded by: Matia Chowdhury
- Succeeded by: Matia Chowdhury

Member of parliament
- In office 5 March 1991 – 27 October 2006
- Preceded by: Mohammad Mobarak Ali
- Succeeded by: Mohammad Shubid Ali Bhuiyan
- Constituency: Comilla-1
- In office 25 January 2009 – 24 January 2014
- Preceded by: Khandokar Mosharraf Hossain
- Succeeded by: Mohammed Amir Hossain
- Constituency: Comilla-2

Personal details
- Born: Mohammad Khorshed Anwar; 1 January 1933 Homna, Tipperah district, Bengal Presidency
- Died: 24 October 2017 (aged 84) Dhaka, Bangladesh
- Party: Bangladesh National Party
- Relations: Abdul Latif Biswas (father-in-law)
- Occupation: Cabinet Secretary, politician

Mohammad Khorshed Anwar (known as M. K. Anwar; 1 January 1933 – 24 October 2017) was a Bangladesh Nationalist Party politician and a government minister of Bangladesh. He was a five-term Jatiya Sangsad member representing the Comilla-1 and Comilla-2 constituencies.

== Early life and education ==
Anwar was born on 1 January 1933 in Homna, Tipperah district, Bengal Presidency. He passed his matriculation in 1948. He completed his Intermediate of Science (I. Sc.) from Dhaka College in 1950. He obtained an Bachelor of Science (Honours) degree in Statistics from the University of Dhaka. Furthermore, he completed an Master of Science degree in Statistics from the same university.

== Career ==
Anwar entered government service in 1956 as an officer of the Civil Service of Pakistan (CSP). He served as the finance secretary and cabinet secretary. He joined Bangladesh Nationalist Party (BNP) in 1991.

Anwar was first elected as a Jatiya Sangsad member for Comilla-1 at the 1991 general election. He was re-elected at the 1996 and 2001 general elections. He was a standing committee member of the BNP. He served as the minister of agriculture in the third Khaleda Cabinet during 2001–2006. He was a vice-president of the party.

== Lawsuits ==
In 2014, Anwar was sued by the Bangladesh Police for causing communal disharmony after he accused the Bangladesh Awami League of Quran burning during Hifazat-e Islam protests, while proclaiming Hifazats innocence. In 2015, Bangladesh police filed a case against him over violence during the 10th national elections. In March 2017, arrest warrants were issued against him.

== Death ==
Anwar died on 24 October 2017.
