= Abdur Rashid (engineer) =

Bangladeshi politician

Engr. Abdur Rashid
- আব্দুর রশীদ

Member of the Bangladesh Parliament for Comilla-2
- In office 7 May 1986 – 6 December 1990
- Preceded by: Boundaries established
- Succeeded by: Khandaker Mosharraf Hossain

Member of Parliament for Comilla-8
- In office 18 February 1979 – 24 March 1982
- Preceded by: Muzaffar Ali
- Succeeded by: Boundaries changed

Member of the East Pakistan Provincial Assembly
- In office 1970–1970
- Constituency: Comilla-9

Personal details
- Born: 1937 North Nasruddi, Tipperah District, Bengal Presidency
- Died: January 20, 2006 (aged 68–69) Bangladesh
- Party: Awami League; Jatiya Party (Ershad); National Socialist Party
- Education: Ahsanullah Engineering College; Jagannath College

Abdur Rashid (Bengali: আব্দুর রশীদ; 1937 – 20 January 2006) was a Bangladeshi politician and engineer. He was the former member of parliament for Comilla-2.

== Early life and education ==
Abdur Rashid was born in 1937 to a Bengali family of Muslim Beparis in the village of North Nasruddi in Daudkandi, Tipperah District, Bengal Presidency (now Bangladesh). He was a son of Chunnu Mia Bepari. Abdur Rashid passed his matriculation from Daudkandi High School in 1952, and ISC from Jagannath College in 1954. He received his Bachelor of Engineering with distinction from Ahsanullah Engineering College in 1958.

== Career ==
Abdur Rashid began his career as an engineer for the Comilla District Board. He was elected to the East Pakistan Provincial Assembly as an Awami League candidate for Comilla-9 at the 1970 elections but this assembly was not formed. Then the Bangladesh Liberation War broke out and so he helped out. He left the Awami League in 1973, joining the National Socialist Party and being appointed president of the Comilla District Board.

Abdur Rashid was elected to the second Jatiya Sangsad from Comilla-8 as a National Socialist Party candidate following the 1979 Bangladeshi general election. He left the part on 30 May 1981. Abdur Rashid was elected yet again to parliament from Comilla-2 as an independent candidate in the 1986 Bangladeshi general election, later joining the Jatiya Party. He was appointed Minister of Labor and Public Welfare in the cabinet of President Hussain Muhammad Ershad but was dismissed from the cabinet on 10 August 1987. He was re-elected again at the 1988 Bangladeshi general election as a Jatiya Party candidate.

He was unsuccessful in gaining a seat as an independent candidate at the 1991 Bangladeshi general election. He contested as an Awami League candidate at the February 1996 Bangladeshi general election but was unsuccessful yet again.

In 2004, Abdur Rashid founded the Bangladesh Institute of Management Studies (BiMS).

== Death ==
Abdur Rashid died on 20 January 2006.
