= Comilla-1 =

Constituency of Bangladesh's Jatiya Sangsad

Coordinates: 23.53°N 90.72°E

- Constituency for the Jatiya Sangsad
- District: Comilla District
- Division: Chittagong Division
- Electorate: 438,616 (2026)

Current constituency
- Created: 1973
- Party: Bangladesh Nationalist Party
- Member: Khandaker Mosharraf Hossain
- ← 248 Brahmanbaria-6 250 Comilla-2 →

Comilla-1 is a constituency represented in the Jatiya Sangsad (National Parliament) of Bangladesh since 2026 by Khandaker Mosharraf Hossain of the Bangladesh Nationalist Party.

== Boundaries ==
The constituency encompasses Daudkandi and Meghna Upazila.

== History ==
The constituency was created for the first general elections in newly independent Bangladesh, held in 1973.

Ahead of the 2008 general election, the Election Commission redrew constituency boundaries to reflect population changes revealed by the 2001 Bangladesh census. The 2008 redistricting altered the boundaries of the constituency.

== Members of Parliament ==
Election	Member	Party
1973	Mohammad Sayedul Haque	Awami League
1979	Abdus Sattar Bhuiyan	Bangladesh Nationalist Party
Major Boundary Changes
1986	Mohammad Mobarak Ali	Jatiya Party
1991	M. K. Anwar	Bangladesh Nationalist Party
Jun 1996	M. K. Anwar	Bangladesh Nationalist Party
2001	M. K. Anwar	Bangladesh Nationalist Party
2008	Mohammad Shubid Ali Bhuiyan	Awami League
2014	Mohammad Shubid Ali Bhuiyan	Awami League
2018	Mohammad Shubid Ali Bhuiyan	Awami League
2024	Abdus Sabur	Awami League
2026	Khandaker Mosharraf Hossain	Bangladesh Nationalist Party

== Elections ==
=== Elections in the 2020s ===
General election 2026: Comilla-1
Party	Candidate	Votes	%	±%
BNP	Khandaker Mosharraf Hossain	141,440	57.89	−9.51
Jamaat	Md. Maniruzzamam	94,845	38.82	+38.32
Majority		46,595	19.07	−16.73
Turnout		244,334	55.70	+19.40
Registered electors		438,616		
BNP gain from AL				

=== Elections in the 2010s ===
General Election 2014: Comilla-1
Party	Candidate	Votes	%	±%
AL	Mohammad Shubid Ali Bhuiyan (Note: Sources vary. One reports a lower 2014 turnout of 109,117 with a somewhat higher vote count for Bhuiyan, and lower vote counts for the candidates finishing in third through fifth place, but the discrepancies in the figures are not large enough to change the overall outcome.)	90,077	81.0	+27.8
Independent	Naim Hasan	18,572	16.7	N/A
JP(E)	Abu Jayed Al Mahmud	2,026	1.8	N/A
Independent	Md. Zaman Sarkar	302	0.3	N/A
Independent	Basudeb Saha	268	0.2	N/A
Majority		71,505	64.3	+55.7
Turnout		111,245	36.3	−46.8
AL hold				

=== Elections in the 2000s ===
General Election 2008: Comilla-1
Party	Candidate	Votes	%	±%
AL	Mohammad Shubid Ali Bhuiyan	114,818	53.2	+21.6
BNP	Khandaker Mosharraf Hossain	96,378	44.7	−22.7
IAB	Md. Al Amin	1,977	0.9	N/A
Independent	Md. Abdus Sattar	1,920	0.9	N/A
Zaker Party	Md. Hazrat Ali Khan	309	0.1	N/A
BKA	Sultan Mohiuddin	244	0.1	N/A
Majority		18,440	8.6	−27.2
Turnout		215,646	83.1	+20.4
AL gain from BNP				

General Election 2001: Comilla-1
Party	Candidate	Votes	%	±%
BNP	M. K. Anwar	73,936	67.4	−1.0
AL	Jahangir Alam Sarkar	34,645	31.6	+2.4
IJOF	Shamsuddin Ahamed	592	0.5	N/A
Independent	Mojammel Haq	384	0.4	N/A
Jatiya Party (M)	Mohammad Golam Mustafa	100	0.1	N/A
Majority		39,291	35.8	−3.4
Turnout		109,657	62.7	+0.6
BNP hold				

=== Elections in the 1990s ===
General Election June 1996: Comilla-1
Party	Candidate	Votes	%	±%
BNP	M. K. Anwar	69,356	68.4	−3.6
AL	Jahangir Alam Sarkar	29,594	29.2	+7.2
JP(E)	Mahabubul Haque Dulon	843	0.8	N/A
IOJ	A. Samad	697	0.7	N/A
Jamaat	Md. A. Aziz Molla	544	0.5	N/A
Zaker Party	A. T. M. Obaidul Haque	317	0.3	N/A
Majority		39,762	39.2	−10.8
Turnout		101,351	62.1	+14.3
BNP hold				

General Election 1991: Comilla-1
Party	Candidate	Votes	%	±%
BNP	M. K. Anwar	69,941	72.0	
AL	Mortuza Hossain Mollah	21,380	22.0	
Independent	Chowdhury ABM Kawsar Ahmed	2,338	2.4	
Independent	Md. Monir Ahmed	1,535	1.6	
Bangladesh Janata Party	AKM Zamshed Alam	1,118	1.2	
NAP (Muzaffar)	Shafiq Ahang Khan	376	0.4	
Jatiya Samajtantrik Dal-JSD	AKM Fazlul Haq	323	0.3	
Jatiya Janata Party and Gonotantrik Oikkya Jot	Sarkar Nasiruddin Ahmed	147	0.2	
Majority		48,561	50.0	
Turnout		97,158	47.8	
BNP gain from JP(E)				
