= Abdul Majeed (politician) =

Bangladeshi politician

Member of the Bangladesh Parliament for Comilla-2
- In office 30 January 2024 – 6 August 2024
- Preceded by: Selima Ahmad

Personal details
- Born: 8 October 1950 (age 75)
- Party: Independent
- Education: University of Dhaka
- Occupation: Politician

Abdul Majeed (born 8 October 1950) is a Bangladeshi politician. He is a former Jatiya Sangsad member representing the Comilla-2 constituency. He lost his position in 2024 when parliament was dissolved as a result of the Non-cooperation movement.

== Early life ==
Abdul Majeed was born on 8 October 1950 to Tota Mia and Feroza Begum in Joynagar village of Homna Upazila, Comilla. He obtained his master's degree in applied mathematics from University of Dhaka.
