= Abdus Sabur (politician) =

Awami League politician

Member of the Bangladesh Parliament for Comilla-1
- In office 30 January 2024 – 6 August 2024
- Preceded by: Mohammad Shubid Ali Bhuiyan
- Succeeded by: Khandaker Mosharraf Hossain

President of Institution of Engineers, Bangladesh (IEB)
- Succeeded by: Engr. Mohammad Reazul Islam (Rezu)

Personal details
- Born: 1 March 1963 (age 63)
- Party: Bangladesh Awami League
- Education: Bangladesh University of Engineering and Technology

Abdus Sabur (born 1 March 1963) is a Bangladesh Awami League politician and a former Jatiya Sangsad member representing the Comilla-1 constituency. He is Science and Technology Affairs Secretary of Bangladesh Awami League. He is elected president of Institution of Engineers, Bangladesh.
