= Balorampur Union =

Balorampur Union বলরামপুর ইউনিয়ন
- Union
- Location in Bangladesh
- Coordinates: 23.623055°N 90.807676°E
- Country: Bangladesh
- Division: Chittagong
- District: Comilla
- Upazila: Titas
- Time zone: UTC+6 (BST)
- Website: balorampurup.comilla.gov.bd

Balorampur Union (Bengali: বলরামপুর ইউনিয়ন) is a union parishad under Titas Upazila of Comilla District in the Chittagong Division of eastern Bangladesh.

Gazipur Khan High School and College, founded in 1963, is the only higher secondary school in the union.
