= Gouripur Union =

Gouripur Union গৌরীপুর ইউনিয়ন
- Union
- Location in Bangladesh
- Coordinates: 23.541142°N 90.785653°E
- Country: Bangladesh
- Division: Chittagong
- District: Comilla
- Upazila: Daudkandi

Area
  - Total: 8.40 km^{2} (3.24 sq mi)

Population (2001)
  - Total: 30,300
- Time zone: UTC+6 (BST)
- Postal Code: 3517
- Website: gouripurup.comilla.gov.bd

Gouripur Union (Bengali: গৌরীপুর ইউনিয়ন) is a union parishad under Daudkandi Upazila of Comilla District in the Chittagong Division of eastern Bangladesh.
