= Bangladesh Women Chamber of Commerce and Industry =

Chamber of commerce in Bangladesh

- Formation: 2001
- Headquarters: Dhaka, Bangladesh
- Region served: Bangladesh
- Official language: Bengali
- Website: www.bwcci-bd.org

Bangladesh Women Chamber of Commerce and Industry or BWCCI, is an industry trade body of women entrepreneurs. Selima Ahmad is the founding President of the Bangladesh Women Chamber of Commerce and Industry.

== History ==
Bangladesh Women Chamber of Commerce and Industry was established in 2001 by Selima Ahmad. It was the first women's chamber in Bangladesh. It conducts research on women entrepreneurs in Bangladesh. In 2016, the chamber sought funding of 250 million taka to establish training center for women entrepreneurs.
