= Zearkandi Union =

Zearkandi Union জিয়ারকান্দি ইউনিয়ন
- Union
- Location in Bangladesh
- Coordinates: 23.548489°N 90.793042°E
- Country: Bangladesh
- Division: Chittagong
- District: Comilla
- Upazila: Titas

Government
  - Chairman: Alhajj MD. Ali Ashraf

Area
  - Total: 14 km^{2} (5.4 sq mi)

Population (2001)
  - Total: 29,500
- Time zone: UTC+6 (BST)
- Website: zearkandiup.comilla.gov.bd

Zearkandi Union (Bengali: জিয়ারকান্দি ইউনিয়ন) is a union parishad under Titas Upazila of Comilla District in the Chittagong Division of eastern Bangladesh.
