= Mohammed Amir Hossain =

Bangladeshi politician

Jatiya Sangsad member from Comilla-2
- In office 2014–2018
- Preceded by: M. K. Anwar
- Succeeded by: Selima Ahmad

Personal details
- Party: Jatiya Party

Mohammed Amir Hossain is a Bangladesh Awami League politician and the incumbent Member of Parliament from Comilla-2.

== Career ==
Hossain was elected as a member of parliament in 2014 from Comilla-2 as a candidate of Jatiya Party (Ershad).
