= Jagatpur Union =

Jagatpur Union জগতপুর ইউনিয়ন
- Union
- Location in Bangladesh
- Coordinates: 23.6048°N 90.7628°E
- Country: Bangladesh
- Division: Chittagong
- District: Comilla
- Upazilas: Titas

Area
  - Total: 14.14 km^{2} (5.46 sq mi)

Population (2001)
  - Total: 19,830
- Time zone: UTC+6 (BST)
- Postal Code: 3517
- Website: jagatpurup.comilla.gov.bd

Jagatpur Union (Bengali: জগতপুর ইউনিয়ন) is a union parishad under Titas Upazila of Comilla District in the Chittagong Division of eastern Bangladesh.

There are three secondary schools in the union: Batakandi Sarkar Shaher Ali Abul Hossain Memorial High School, Jagatpur Sadhana High School, and Keshabpur Girls High School.
