= Meghna Upazila =

Meghna মেঘনা
- Upazila
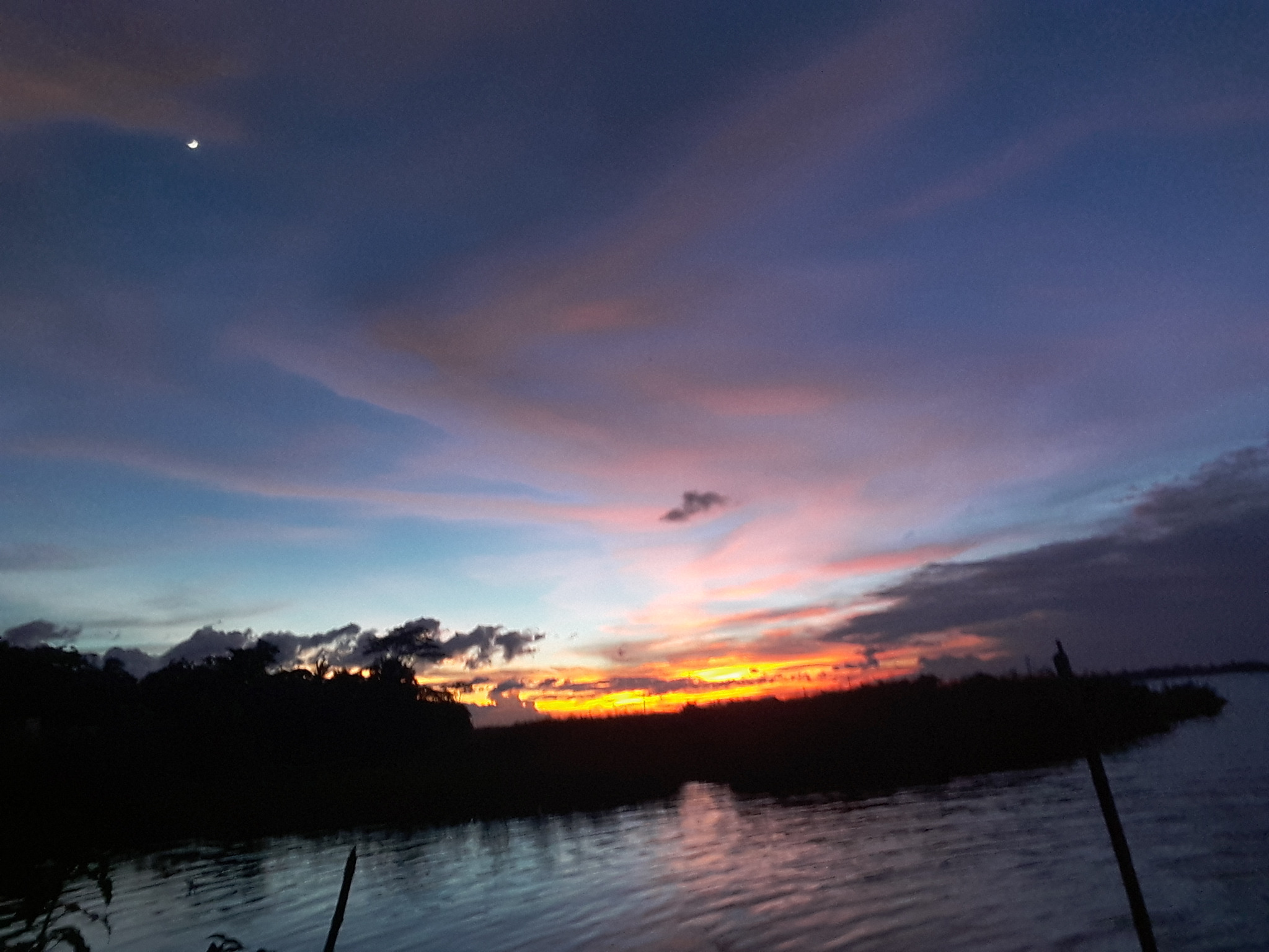
- Meghna River at Shekher Goan, Meghna Upazila, Cumilla District

- Coordinates: 23.62°N 90.68°E
- Country: Bangladesh
- Division: Chattogram
- District: Cumilla

Area
  - Total: 99.57 km^{2} (38.44 sq mi)

Population (2022)
  - Total: 118,806
  - Density: 1,193/km^{2} (3,090/sq mi)
- Time zone: UTC+6 (BST)
- Postal code: 3512
- Website: meghna.comilla.gov.bd

Meghna Upazila mauza geocode map

Meghna (Bengali: মেঘনা) is an upazila in Cumilla. In the end of 1998, Meghna was declared as the upazila. This upazila was formed with 5 unions of Daudkandi upazila and 3 unions of Homna upazila. As the Meghna river flows on one side of this upazila, is named after the proposal of the name of Meghna.

== Geographical location ==
Araihazar on the north, Sonargaon on the west, Gazaria and Daudkandi on the south and Homna and Titas upazilas on the east.

== Demographics ==
Religions in Meghna Upazila (2022)
Religion	Percent
Islam	95.52%
Hinduism	4.47%
Other or not stated	0.01%

According to the 2022 Bangladeshi census, Meghna Upazila had 28,111 households and a population of 118,806. 10.44% of the population were under 5 years of age. Meghna had a literacy rate (age 7 and over) of 69.16%: 71.61% for males and 67.14% for females, and a sex ratio of 85.72 males for every 100 females. 6,618 (5.57%) lived in urban areas.

According to the 2011 Census of Bangladesh, Meghna Upazila had 21,617 households and a population of 112,453. 27,816 (24.74%) were under 10 years of age. Meghna has a literacy rate (age 7 and over) of 44.61%, compared to the national average of 51.8%, and a sex ratio of 992 females per 1000 males. 6,159 (5.48%) lived in urban areas.

== Economics ==
This is an agrarian area. Farmers and fisheries are the main sources of income. Many are working as migrant Bangladeshi.

== Administration ==
Meghna Upazila is divided into eight union councils: Barakanda, Chandanpur, Chalibanga, Govindapur, Luter Char, Manikar Char, Radhanagar, and Vaorkhola. The union councils are subdivided into 38 mauzas and 102 villages.

== Education ==
Literacy and educational institutions Average literacy 33.34%; Male 38.04%, female 29.92%. Educational institutions: college 2, secondary school 7, primary school 51, community primary school 1, madrasa 2.

== Infrastructure ==
- Government hospitals: 2 (Meghna Upazila Health Complex & Luter Char Union Health complex), medical clinic: 4
- Hat Bazaar: 17
- Post office: 5

== See also ==
- Upazilas of Bangladesh
- Districts of Bangladesh
- Divisions of Bangladesh
