= Karikandi Union =

Karikandi Union কড়িকান্দি ইউনিয়ন
- Union
- Location in Bangladesh
- Coordinates: 23.583361°N 90.788902°E
- Country: Bangladesh
- Division: Chittagong
- District: Comilla
- Upazila: Titas

Government
  - Chairman: Mohammad Mohsin Bhyain

Area
  - Total: 12.42 km^{2} (4.80 sq mi)

Population (2001)
  - Total: 23,000
- Time zone: UTC+6 (BST)
- Website: karikandiup.comilla.gov.bd

Karikandi Union (Bengali: কড়িকান্দি ইউনিয়ন) is a union parishad under Titas Upazila of Comilla District in the Chittagong Division of eastern Bangladesh.
