= Tornado outbreak of August 6, 1969 =

Severe weather event in the Upper Midwest of the United States

- Damage to cabins near the current Lake Roosevelt Resort just north of Outing, Minnesota

Tornado outbreak
- Tornadoes: 14
- Max. rating: F4 tornado
- Duration: August 6, 1969
- Highest gusts: 60 kn (69 mph; 110 km/h) in Iowa
- Largest hail: 1 in (2.5 cm) in Clearwater County, Minnesota

Overall effects
- Fatalities: 15+
- Injuries: 109
- Damage: $5,120,000 ($44,950,000 in 2025 USD) (Note: All losses are in 1969 USD unless otherwise noted.)
- Areas affected: Minnesota; Nebraska
- Part of the tornadoes and tornado outbreaks of 1969

On August 6, 1969, a destructive tornado outbreak affected portions of the Upper Midwest—principally north-central Minnesota. The severe weather event generated 14 confirmed tornadoes, killed 15 people, and caused 109 injuries. To date, the outbreak remains the deadliest on record in the North Woods region of Minnesota. It is also known as the 1969 Minnesota tornado outbreak and the 1969 North Woods tornado outbreak. The most destructive tornado of the outbreak was a 33-mile-long (53 km) violent F4 that leveled miles of timberland and farmland across portions of Crow Wing, Cass, and Aitkin counties in Minnesota, killing at least 12 people and injuring 70 others. (Note: An outbreak is generally defined as a group of at least six tornadoes (the number sometimes varies slightly according to local climatology) with no more than a six-hour gap between individual tornadoes. An outbreak sequence, prior to (after) the start of modern records in 1950, is defined as a period of no more than two (one) consecutive days without at least one significant (F2 or stronger) tornado.)

== Background ==
An F4 tornado caused major damage to many cabins and wide swaths of forest on both sides of Lake Roosevelt in the Outing, Minnesota, area.

Very warm, humid, summertime air had pushed into central and southern Minnesota on August 6, 1969. Minneapolis recorded a high temperature of 93 °F (34 °C) with dew points near 70 °F (21 °C). Meanwhile, strong upper-level winds over northern Minnesota and an approaching cold front from the west added the needed ingredient for the strong storms. Two distinct thunderstorms formed approximately 45 mi (72 km) apart and tracked east-northeastward across Minnesota at 50 mph (80 km/h). These parallel storms generated 14 tornadoes, killing 15 people and injuring 109.

The first tornado of the day, rated F0, touched down at 1:15 p.m. CDT (12:15 p.m. CST; 18:15 UTC) in Beltrami County. The main tornado event started about three hours later in Cass County when an F3 tornado touched down southwest of Backus, injuring four people. The most damaging tornado of the outbreak touched down at 4:48 p.m. CDT (3:48 p.m. CST; 21:48 UTC) in Crow Wing County. It achieved F4 strength, traveling 33 miles (53 km) through Crow Wing, Cass and Aitkin counties. The area around Outing was especially hard hit by this tornado, where 11 deaths and 40 injuries occurred on the shores of Roosevelt Lake.

Several more strong tornadoes touched down over the next two hours, killing one person near Jacobson and two people near Two Harbors. Damage and casualties were limited, however, because most of the tornadoes, however large in size, struck rural areas.

== Confirmed tornadoes ==
Confirmed tornadoes by Fujita rating
FU	F0	F1	F2	F3	F4	F5	Total
1	2	0	8	2	1	0	14

{{efn|Prior to 1990, there is a likely undercount of tornadoes, particularly E/F0–1, with reports of weaker tornadoes becoming more common as population increased. A sharp increase in the annual average E/F0–1 count by approximately 200 tornadoes was noted upon the implementation of NEXRAD Doppler weather radar in 1990–1991. (Note: Historically, the number of tornadoes globally and in the United States was and is likely underrepresented: research by Grazulis on annual tornado activity suggests that, as of 2001, only 53% of yearly U.S. tornadoes were officially recorded. Documentation of tornadoes outside the United States was historically less exhaustive, owing to the lack of monitors in many nations and, in some cases, to internal political controls on public information. Most countries only recorded tornadoes that produced severe damage or loss of life. Significant low biases in U.S. tornado counts likely occurred through the early 1990s, when advanced NEXRAD was first installed and the National Weather Service began comprehensively verifying tornado occurrences.) 1974 marked the first year where significant tornado (E/F2+) counts became homogenous with contemporary values, attributed to the consistent implementation of Fujita scale assessments. (Note: The Fujita scale was devised under the aegis of scientist T. Theodore Fujita in the early 1970s. Prior to the advent of the scale in 1971, tornadoes in the United States were officially unrated. Tornado ratings were retroactively applied to events prior to the formal adoption of the F-scale by the National Weather Service. While the Fujita scale has been superseded by the Enhanced Fujita scale in the U.S. since February 1, 2007, Canada used the old scale until April 1, 2013; nations elsewhere, like the United Kingdom, apply other classifications such as the TORRO scale.) Numerous discrepancies on the details of tornadoes in this outbreak exist between sources. The total count of tornadoes and ratings differs from various agencies accordingly. The list below documents information from the most contemporary official sources alongside assessments from tornado historian Thomas P. Grazulis.

Color/symbol key
Color / symbol	Description
†	Data from Grazulis 1990/1993/2001b
¶	Data from a local National Weather Service office
※	Data from the 1969 Storm Data publication
‡	Data from the NCEI database
♯	Maximum width of tornado
±	Tornado was rated below F2 intensity by Grazulis but a specific rating is unavailable.

List of confirmed tornadoes in the tornado outbreak of August 6, 1969
F#	Location	County / Parish	State	Start Coord. (Note: All starting coordinates are based on the NCEI database and may not reflect contemporary analyses)	Time (UTC) (Note: All dates are based on the local time zone where the tornado touched down; however, all times are in Coordinated Universal Time and dates are split at midnight CST/CDT for consistency.)	Path length	Width (Note: The listed width values are primarily the average/mean width of the tornadoes, with those having known maximum widths denoted by ♯. From 1952 to 1994, reports largely list mean width whereas contemporary years list maximum width. Values provided by Grazulis are the average width, with estimates being rounded down (i.e. 0.5 mi (0.80 km) is rounded down from 880 yards to 800 yards.)	Damage
F0	Lake Bemidji	Beltrami	Minnesota	47.50°N 94.85°W	18:15–?	0.1 mi (0.16 km)‡	33 yd (30 m)‡	Unknown
F0	A short-lived waterspout was sighted.							
F3	NE of Nimrod to ENE of Backus	Cass	Minnesota	46.72°N 94.73°W	21:20–21:40※	18 mi (29 km)※	200 yd (180 m)†	$850,000※
F3	This intense tornado, which lifted at the southeastern corner of Big Portage Lake, significantly damaged or destroyed 13 farms to the southeast of Backus. Additionally, it destroyed 11 homes to the east of Backus. One trailer was destroyed as well. Four people were seriously injured and hospitalized.							
F4	NNW of Swanburg to S of Hill City※	Crow Wing, Cass, Aitkin	Minnesota	46.78°N 94.22°W	21:48–22:28※	33 mi (53 km)※	~2,640 yd (2,410 m)♯¶	$2,150,000※
F4	12+ deaths – This large, violent tornado attained a width of almost 1 1/2 mi (2 km; 2,640 yd; 2,414 m) while passing a short distance north of Outing. Of the dozen deaths 11 took place around Lake Roosevelt, and 40 children in the vicinity were injured while vacationing. Along its path, the tornado hurled cars and downed thousands of trees, many of which were debarked. The tornado also destroyed scores of cabins and leveled farmsteads. In all, 70 people were injured. The death toll may have exceeded 12.							
F2†	NNE of Chisholm to S of Idington	St. Louis	Minnesota	47.60°N 92.83°W	22:25–22:38※	10.5 mi (16.9 km)※	>3,520 yd (3,220 m)♯※	$675,000※
F2†	This tornado, which ended just north of Big Sandy Lake, reportedly exceeded 2 mi (3 km; 3,520 yd; 3,219 m) in width. It destroyed numerous trees, homes, and cabins. Nine people were injured.							
F2†	WNW of Jacobson※	Aitkin	Minnesota	46.90°N 93.45°W	22:50–23:03※	11 mi (18 km)※	Unknown	$250,000
F2†	1 death – This tornado, which formed from the same storm as the Outing F4, destroyed a cabin, seven agricultural outbuildings, and a pair of farmhouses. The number of injuries was unknown at the time, but was later listed as three in official records. The NCEI incorrectly list the path as extending from southeast of Hill City to east-southeast of Ball Bluff.							
F2±	WNW to NNE of Wahlsten (1st tornado)※	St. Louis	Minnesota	47.73°N 92.28°W	23:00–?	4 mi (6.4 km)※	150 yd (140 m)	$20,000※
F2±	This tornado and the following two events occurred in close proximity and succession. Further information is lacking.							
F2±	WNW to NNE of Wahlsten (2nd tornado)※	St. Louis	Minnesota	47.77°N 92.27°W	23:00–?	2 mi (3.2 km)※	150 yd (140 m)	$19,000※
F2±	Details are unavailable.							
F2†	SW of Tower to SSW of Eagles Nest†	St. Louis	Minnesota	47.80°N 92.28°W	23:00–?	9 mi (14 km)※	200 yd (180 m)†	$110,000※
F2†	This strong tornado, which ended near Eagles Nest Lake No. 3, damaged or destroyed several homes and barns, while felling hundreds of trees.							
F3¶	NW of Floodwood to NW of Baden※	St. Louis	Minnesota	46.95°N 92.98°W	23:00–23:29※	18 mi (29 km)※	4,400 yd (4,000 m)♯※	$845,000※
F3¶	According to the National Weather Service (NWS), damage from this tornado was nearly as intense as that of the Outing F4, spawned by the same thunderstorm. This tornado was up to 2.5 mi (4 km; 4,400 yd; 4,023 m) wide near Floodwood. It killed 39 head of cattle, felled hundreds of trees, and destroyed several cabins and barns. 20 people were injured. The path ended north-northeast of Prosit.							
F2†	SW of Eagles Nest to SSE of McComber	St. Louis	Minnesota	47.82°N 92.13°W	23:15–?	5 mi (8.0 km)※	200 yd (180 m)†	$60,000※
F2†	This tornado destroyed trees and cottages in its path.							
FU※	Bear Island Lake	St. Louis	Minnesota	Unknown	23:30–?	0.5 mi (0.80 km)	150 yd (140 m)	$10,000
FU※	This tornado is not officially listed, but was recorded in the publication Storm Data.							
F2±	SSW of Burntside to S of Ely※	St. Louis	Minnesota	47.87°N 91.93°W	23:35–?	3 mi (4.8 km)※	193 yd (176 m)‡	$8,000※
F2±	This event may have consisted of twin tornadoes that merged. Further information is unavailable. A jet-like din was noted for a few minutes.							
F2†	N of Island Lake to NE of Two Harbors†	St. Louis, Lake	Minnesota	47.05°N 92.15°W	23:50–00:15※	21 mi (34 km)※	200 yd (180 m)†	$123,000※
F2†	2 deaths – On the eastern shoreline of Boulder Lake, a cabin was wrecked, resulting in the deaths. Hundreds of trees were splintered and three people were injured. The tornado exhibited a skipping path, with intermittent damage.							
F0	NW of Monroe※	Platte	Nebraska	41.48°N 97.58°W	01:40–?	Unknown	Unknown	Unknown
F0	A brief touchdown occurred over uninhabited countryside.							

== See also ==
- Climate of Minnesota
- List of North American tornadoes and tornado outbreaks
- Tornadoes of 1969

== Sources ==
- Agee, Ernest M.; Childs, Samuel (June 1, 2014). "Adjustments in Tornado Counts, F-Scale Intensity, and Path Width for Assessing Significant Tornado Destruction". Journal of Applied Meteorology and Climatology. 53 (6). American Meteorological Society: 1494–1505. doi:10.1175/JAMC-D-13-0235.1.
- Brooks, Harold E. (April 2004). "On the Relationship of Tornado Path Length and Width to Intensity". Weather and Forecasting. 19 (2): 310–19. Bibcode:2004WtFor..19..310B. doi:10.1175/1520-0434(2004)019<0310:OTROTP>2.0.CO;2.
- Cook, A. R.; Schaefer, J. T. (August 2008). "The Relation of El Niño–Southern Oscillation (ENSO) to Winter Tornado Outbreaks". Monthly Weather Review. 136 (8): 3121–3137. Bibcode:2008MWRv..136.3121C. doi:10.1175/2007MWR2171.1.
- Edwards, Roger; LaDue, James G.; Ferree, John T.; Scharfenberg, Kevin; Maier, Chris; Coulbourne, William L. (May 1, 2013). "Tornado Intensity Estimation: Past, Present, and Future". Bulletin of the American Meteorological Society. 94 (5). American Meteorological Society: 641–653. doi:10.1175/BAMS-D-11-00006.1.
- Grazulis, Thomas P. (May 1984). Violent Tornado Climatography, 1880–1982. OSTI (Technical report). NUREG. Washington, D.C.: Nuclear Regulatory Commission. OSTI 7099491. CR-3670.
  - — (November 1990). Significant Tornadoes 1880–1989. Vol. 2. St. Johnsbury, Vermont: The Tornado Project of Environmental Films. ISBN 1-879362-02-3.
  - — (July 1993). Significant Tornadoes 1680–1991: A Chronology and Analysis of Events. St. Johnsbury, Vermont: The Tornado Project of Environmental Films. ISBN 1-879362-03-1.
  - — (2001a). The Tornado: Nature's Ultimate Windstorm. Norman: University of Oklahoma Press. ISBN 978-0-8061-3538-0.
  - — (2001b). F5-F6 Tornadoes. St. Johnsbury, Vermont: The Tornado Project of Environmental Films.
- National Weather Service (August 1969). Storm Data Publication (Report). National Centers for Environmental Information – via Storm Events Database.
- Kuehnast, Earl L. (August 1969). Written at Saint Paul, Minnesota. "The Different Behavior Patterns of Twelve Tornadoes Occurring August 6, 1969". Special Weather Summary. Climatological Data. Minnesota. 75 (8). Asheville, North Carolina: National Climatic Data Center: 128–9.
- U.S. Weather Bureau (August 1969). "Storm Data and Unusual Weather Phenomena". Storm Data. 11 (8). Asheville, North Carolina: National Climatic Data Center.
