= Kala Kandi Union =

Kalakandi Union কলাকান্দি ইউনিয়ন
- Union
- Location in Bangladesh
- Coordinates: 23.596632°N 90.793912°E
- Country: Bangladesh
- Division: Chittagong
- District: Comilla
- Upazila: Titas
- Time zone: UTC+6 (BST)
- Website: kalakandiup.comilla.gov.bd

Kalakandi Union (Bengali: কলাকান্দি ইউনিয়ন) is a union parishad under Titas Upazila of Comilla District in the Chittagong Division of eastern Bangladesh.
