= Narayandia Union =

Narayandia Union নারান্দিয়া ইউনিয়ন
- Union
- Location in Bangladesh
- Coordinates: 23.56649°N 90.818640°E
- Country: Bangladesh
- Division: Chittagong
- District: Comilla
- Upazila: Titas
- Time zone: UTC+6 (BST)
- Website: Official site of Narayandia Union

Narayandia Union (Bengali: নারান্দিয়া ইউনিয়ন) is a union parishad under Titas Upazila of Comilla District in the Chittagong Division of eastern Bangladesh.
