= Faridul Huda =

Bangladeshi politician

Muhammad Faridul Huda

Member of the Bangladesh Parliament for Comilla-2
- In office 2 April 1979 – 24 March 1982
- Preceded by: Taheruddin Thakur
- Succeeded by: Abdur Rashid

Personal details
- Born: 1929 or 1930
- Died: 14 January 1999
- Party: Bangladesh Nationalist Party
- Other political affiliations: National Awami Party (Bhashani)
- Education: Dhaka Medical College
- Profession: Physician

Muhammad Faridul Huda (born 1929 or 1930; died 1999) was a Bangladeshi physician and politician. He was the member of parliament for Comilla-2 from 1979 to 1982. He was, for a time, the state minister for Health & Population Control in the Ziaur Rahman ministry.

== Biography ==
Huda was born in 1929 or 1930. He earned a degree at Dhaka Medical College.

=== Career ===
Huda ran unsuccessfully for the Comilla-II seat in the 1965 East Pakistan Provincial Assembly election.

Huda joined the National Awami Party (Bhashani) (NAP (B)). He stood for the National Assembly of Pakistan seat of Comilla-II in the 1970 Pakistani general election. He finished last, receiving 1,819 fewer votes than the fifth-place Convention Muslim League (Fazlul Quader) candidate, Azizur Rahman Mollah.

Bangladesh won its independence from Pakistan in 1971. Huda contested again as a NAP (B) candidate in the 1973 Bangladeshi general election.

In 1979, he was elected to parliament from Comilla-2 as a Bangladesh Nationalist Party (BNP) candidate. He was appointed Minister of State for Health & Population Control by President Ziaur Rahman. On 5 April 1981, he resigned along with three others from the 46-member Council of Ministers.

=== Death and legacy ===
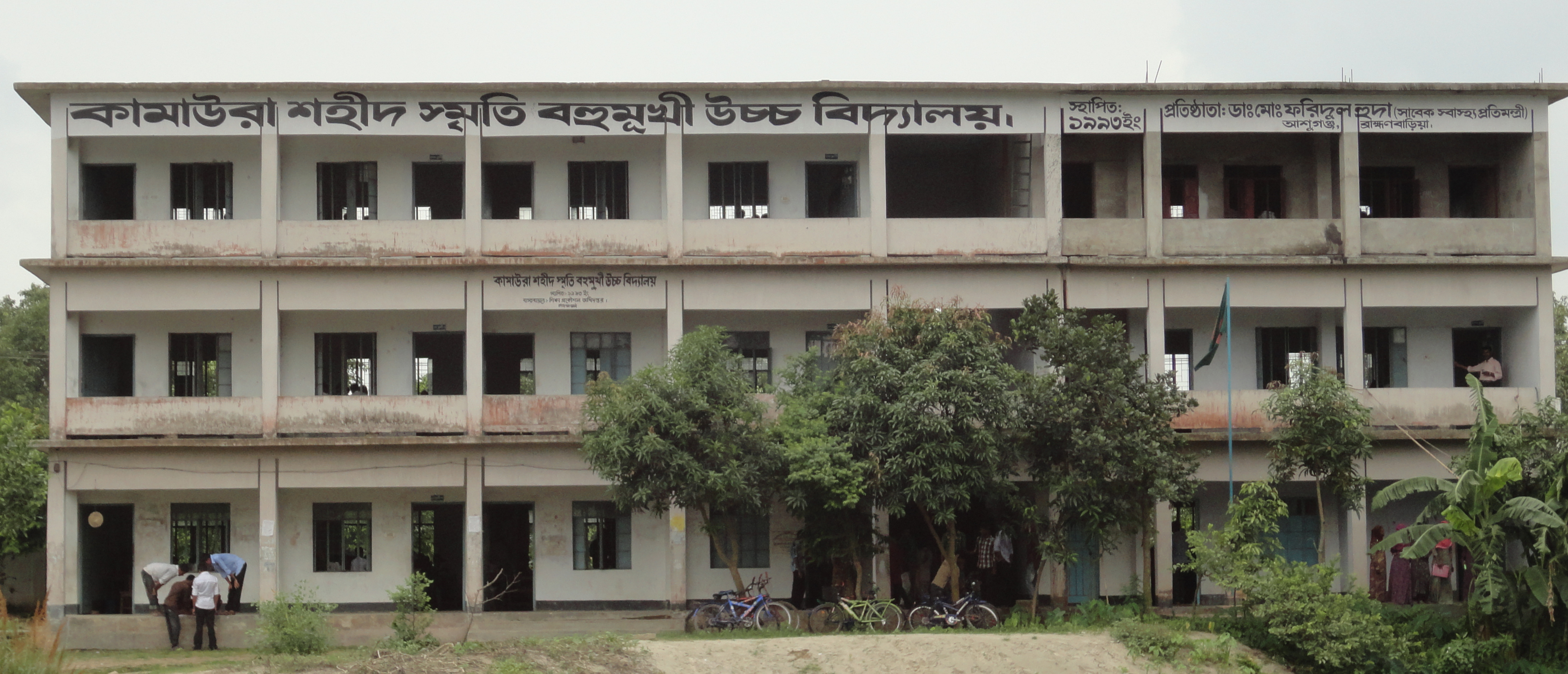
Huda established Kamaura Shaheed Smriti High School in 1993.

Huda died on 14 January 1999. He is buried in Ashuganj, adjacent to the grounds of Kamaura Shaheed Smriti High School, which he founded.

His son, Nazmul Huda Biplob, is also a physician. He sought the BNP nomination for Brahmanbaria-2 in the 2026 Bangladeshi general election.
