= Selima Ahmad =

Bangladeshi politician (1960–2026)

- সেলিমা আহমাদ

Member of the Bangladesh Parliament for Comilla-2
- In office 30 January 2019 – 7 January 2024
- Preceded by: Mohammed Amir Hossain

Personal details
- Born: 7 July 1960 Dhaka, East Pakistan, Pakistan
- Died: 21 June 2026 (aged 65) Bangkok, Thailand
- Party: Bangladesh Awami League
- Spouse: Abdul Matlub Ahmad
- Parents: A. K. M. Fazlul Huq (father); Rahima Huq (mother)
- Education: University of Dhaka
- Awards: See full list

Selima Ahmed (7 July 1960 – 21 June 2026) was a Bangladeshi businesswoman and politician. She was the vice-chairperson of Nitol-Niloy Group and the founder and president of the Bangladesh Women Chamber of Commerce and Industry. She was elected as a member of Jatiya Sangsad from Comilla-2 constituency in 2018. She also served as board member of state-owned Janata Bank Limited and was a board member of Sonali Bank Limited.

In 2014, Ahmad received the Oslo Business for Peace Award for her contributions in the Business sector. She was a Global Ambassador of The International Alliance for Women and Course Teacher of MBA classes at the University of Dhaka.

== Early life ==
Selima Ahmad was born to A. K. M. Fazlul Huq and Rahima Huq.

== Career ==
Ahmad was vice-chairperson of the Nitol-Niloy Group. This group is one of the reputed business houses and has 26 companies. Of them, six are joint ventures and three are public companies. It has presence in automobiles, cement, paper, real estate, electronics and financial services.

== Political career ==
Ahmad was elected as a member of parliament in 2018 from Comilla-2 as a candidate of the Bangladesh Awami League.

== Personal life and death ==
Ahmad was married to Abdul Matlub Ahmad, a business leader and former president of Federation of Bangladesh Chambers of Commerce & Industries (FBCCI). They had two sons.

Ahmad died of cancer at a Bangkok hospital, on 21 June 2026, at the age of 65.

== Awards ==
- Special Recognition Award by the 28th CACCI Conference held in Kuala Lumpur, Malaysia, 2014.
- Oslo Business for Peace Award, 2014
- Jeane J. Kirkpatrick Award by International Republican Institute, United States, 2013
