= Majidpur Union, Titas =

Majidpur Union মজিদপুর ইউনিয়ন
- Union
- Location in Bangladesh
- Coordinates: 23.579589°N 90.768930°E
- Country: Bangladesh
- Division: Chittagong
- District: Comilla
- Upazila: Titas

Area
  - Total: 17.94 km^{2} (6.93 sq mi)

Population (2001)
  - Total: 30,257
- Time zone: UTC+6 (BST)
- Website: majidpurup.comilla.gov.bd

Majidpur Union (Bengali: মজিদপুর ইউনিয়ন) is a union parishad under Titas Upazila of Comilla District in the Chittagong Division of eastern Bangladesh.
