= 1969 Hazlehurst tornadoes =

Series of tornadoes across Mississippi, Kentucky, and Tennessee

Meteorological history
- Formed: January 23, 1969

Tornado outbreak
- Tornadoes: 3
- Max. rating: F4 tornado
- Duration: 13 hours, 20 minutes

Overall effects
- Fatalities: 32
- Injuries: 241
- Areas affected: Mississippi, Kentucky, and Tennessee
- Part of the tornado outbreaks of 1969

A destructive series of three tornadoes hit Mississippi, Kentucky, and Tennessee on January 23, 1969. The most impactful of which was a violent F4 tornado that devastated Hazlehurst, Mississippi and caused 32 fatalities.

== Confirmed tornadoes ==
Confirmed tornadoes by Fujita rating
FU	F0	F1	F2	F3	F4	F5	Total
0	0	1	1	0	1	0	3

List of confirmed tornadoes – Thursday, January 23, 1969 (Note: All dates are based on the local time zone where the tornado touched down; however, all times are in Coordinated Universal Time for consistency.) (Note: Prior to 1994, only the average widths of tornado paths were officially listed.)
F#	Location	County / Parish	State	Start Coord.	Time (UTC)	Path length	Max width	Summary
F4	SSE of Fayette to SW of Newton	Jefferson, Copiah, Simpson, Rankin, Smith, Scott, Newton	MS	31.68°N 91.05°W	11:25–13:00	117.8 mi (189.6 km)	200 yd (180 m)	32 deaths – See section on this tornado – 241 people were injured.
F1	WNW of Cerulean	Caldwell	KY	37°N 87.83°W	22:00–?	0.1 mi (0.16 km)	50 yd (46 m)	Weak, but destructive tornado destroyed a barn, tore the roof off of an outbuilding, and uprooted several trees.
F2	W of Dover	Stewart	TN	37°N 87.83°W	22:05–?	0.1 mi (0.16 km)	10 yd (9.1 m)	Five homes and a tobacco barn were destroyed by this brief, but strong tornado. The tornado caused at least $75,000 (1969 USD) in damage.

=== Hazlehurst, Mississippi ===
Hazlehurst, Mississippi
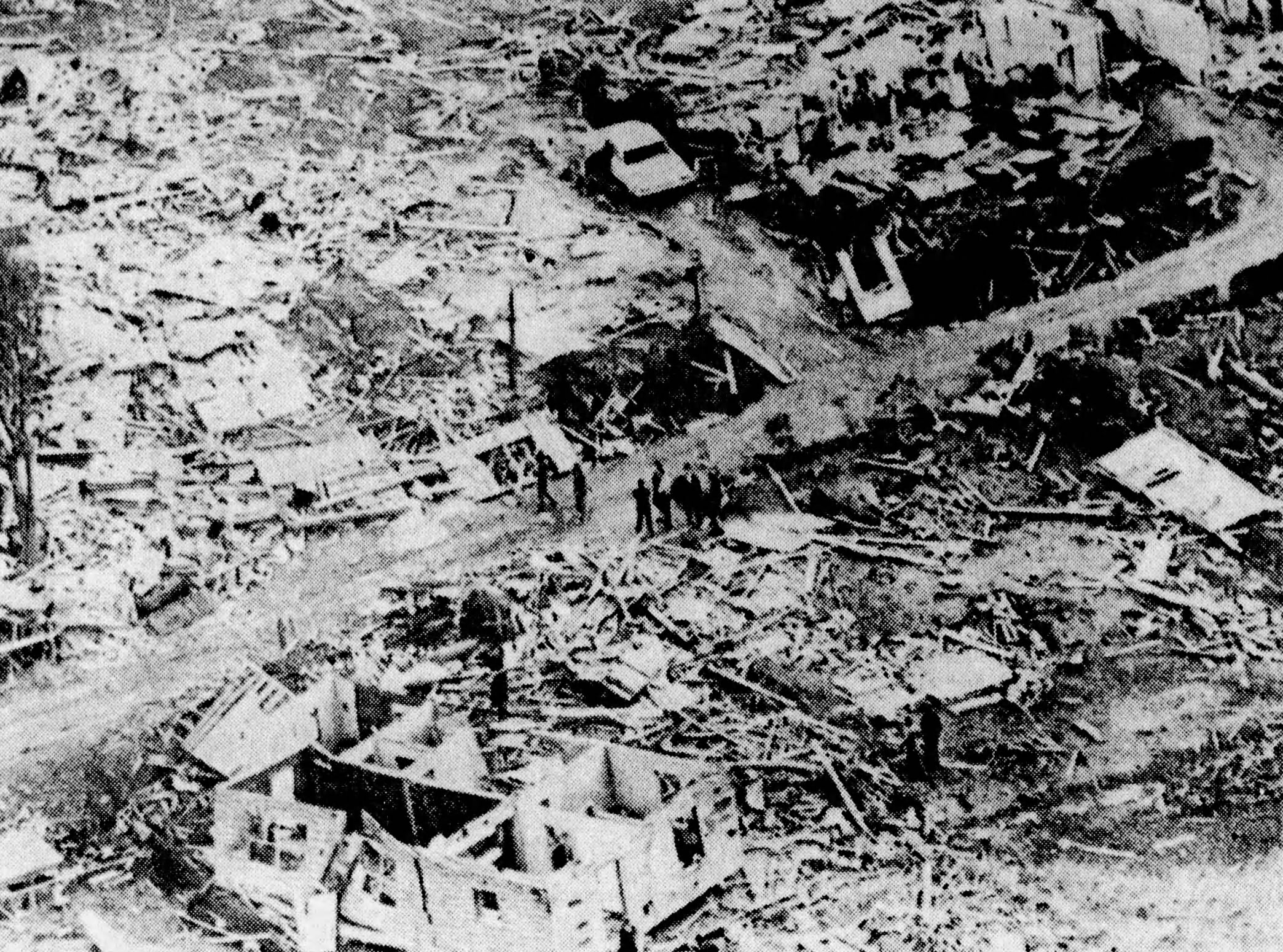
- An aerial of damage in Hazlehurst

Meteorological history
- Date: January 23, 1969
- Formed: January 23, 1969, 5:25 a.m. CST (UTC−05:00)
- Dissipated: January 23, 1969, 7:00 a.m. CST (UTC−05:00)
- Duration: 1 hour, 35 minutes

F4 tornado
- on the Fujita scale
- Highest winds: 235 mph (378 km/h)

Overall effects
- Fatalities: 32
- Injuries: 241

At 4:19 a.m. (CST), radar indicated a strong thunderstorm cell strengthening rapidly southeast of Jonesville, Louisiana in Concordia Parish. A tornado soon occurred in Jefferson County, Mississippi, south-southeast of Fayette, where some damage was reported. The tornado mainly traveled through sparsely populated areas, excluding the Hazlehurst area. Mainly trees were either debarked or uprooted, but structures in Hazlehurst sustained extensive damage. Several parts of the path were widened, with the widest part being about 0.5 mi (880 yd) wide. At another point, the tornado caused ground scouring and downed trees in all directions. Most of the structural damage occurred to outbuildings and farm buildings. The tornado was first noted near the Hazlehurst area at 5:45 a.m. (CST). A number of families in Hazlehurst lived on a hill near a lumber pond. The tornado dumped 18 people into the pond, of which all became missing. Afterwards, the pond was drained to try recovering the missing bodies. In Shady Grove, several buildings were destroyed. In Copiah County, 11 people were killed and 140 people were injured. The tornado caused $900,000 (1969 USD) damage in Copiah County. A family in Simpson County lay down on the floor and were not injured. A bus was parked in front of the home, and its body was blown away. South of Harrisville, a log house was reduced to rubble. Throughout the rest of the path (until the city of Puckett), 12 people were found dead. A family near Puckett were trying to escape the tornado, but their car wouldn't start. Instead, they jumped into a ditch and survived as their three-bedroom home was lifted off of its foundation. One of the family members was seriously injured by a falling limb. The tornado also lifted a tenant house into the air. A hog barn was also destroyed, which resulted in the fatalities of four hogs, of 800 which were in there. The tornado caused minor damage to trees before dissipating near Newton. Overall, 32 people were killed and 241 were injured.

== See also ==
- List of North American tornadoes and tornado outbreaks
- Tornado outbreak sequence of Early-December 1953
  - 1953 Vicksburg, Mississippi tornado
- Tornado outbreak of March 3–4, 1966
- February 1971 Mississippi Delta tornado outbreak
