= Mohammad Shubid Ali Bhuiyan =

Bangladeshi politician

- মোহাম্মদ সুবিদ আলী ভুইয়া

Member of Parliament for Comilla-1
- In office December 2008 – 10 January 2024
- Preceded by: Khandaker Mosharraf Hossain

Principal Staff Officer of Armed Forces Division
- In office 12 January 1999 – 12 April 2004
- President: Shahabuddin Ahmed; A. Q. M. Badruddoza Chowdhury; Muhammad Jamiruddin Sircar (acting); Iajuddin Ahmed
- Prime Minister: Sheikh Hasina; Latifur Rahman (acting); Khaleda Zia
- Preceded by: Abdus Salam
- Succeeded by: A. I. M. Mostofa Reza Nur

Personal details
- Born: 28 July 1945 (age 81) Daudkandi, Bengal, British India
- Party: Awami League
- Education: University of Dhaka

Military service
- Allegiance: Pakistan (before 1971); Bangladesh
- Branch/service: Pakistan Army; Bangladesh Army
- Years of service: 1966–2004
- Rank: Major General
- Unit: East Bengal Regiment
- Commands: Principal Staff Officer of Armed Forces Division; GOC of 55th Infantry Division; Commander of Logistics Area; Station Commander, Chittagong; Commander of 44th Infantry Brigade
- Battles/wars: Bangladesh Liberation War 1996 Bangladeshi coup attempt

Mohammad Shubid Ali Bhuiyan is a retired Bangladesh Army officer and Awami League politician and former member of parliament for Comilla-1.

== Birth and early life ==
Shubid Ali Bhuiyan was born in Comilla District on 28 July 1945.

== Career ==
He graduated from Dhaka University's Islamic history and culture department. In 1966 he joined the Pakistan Army. In 1969 he was transferred to the East Bengal Regiment. He fought under the command of Major General Ziaur Rahman in the Bangladesh Liberation War. From 1999 to 2004, he was the Armed Forces Division's principal staff officer under Prime Minister Sheikh Hasina of the Awami League. His name came up in the Purulia arms drop case as his signature was on the end-user certificate.

In 2001 he attempted to get the Bangladesh Nationalist Party nomination to contest the parliamentary election. He contested the 2008 parliamentary election under the Awami League and was elected member of parliament for Daudkandi, Comilla. He is the chairman of the parliamentary standing committee on defence.

== Controversies ==
In 2025, three cases were filed against Bhuiyan and his family members accusing them of illegally amassing Tk 8.85 crore in assets and engaging in suspicious bank transactions amounting to Tk 321.61 crore.
