= Stewart Lake (Minnesota) =

Lake in the state of Minnesota, United States

- Location within Minnesota
- Location: Crow Wing County, Minnesota
- Coordinates: 46°47′23″N 94°13′15″W
- Type: lake

Stewart Lake is a lake in Crow Wing County, in the U.S. state of Minnesota.

Stewart Lake was named for Charles Stewart, a naval officer in the War of 1812.

== See also ==
- List of lakes in Minnesota
