= Daudkandi Upazila =

Daudkandi দাউদকান্দি
- Upazila
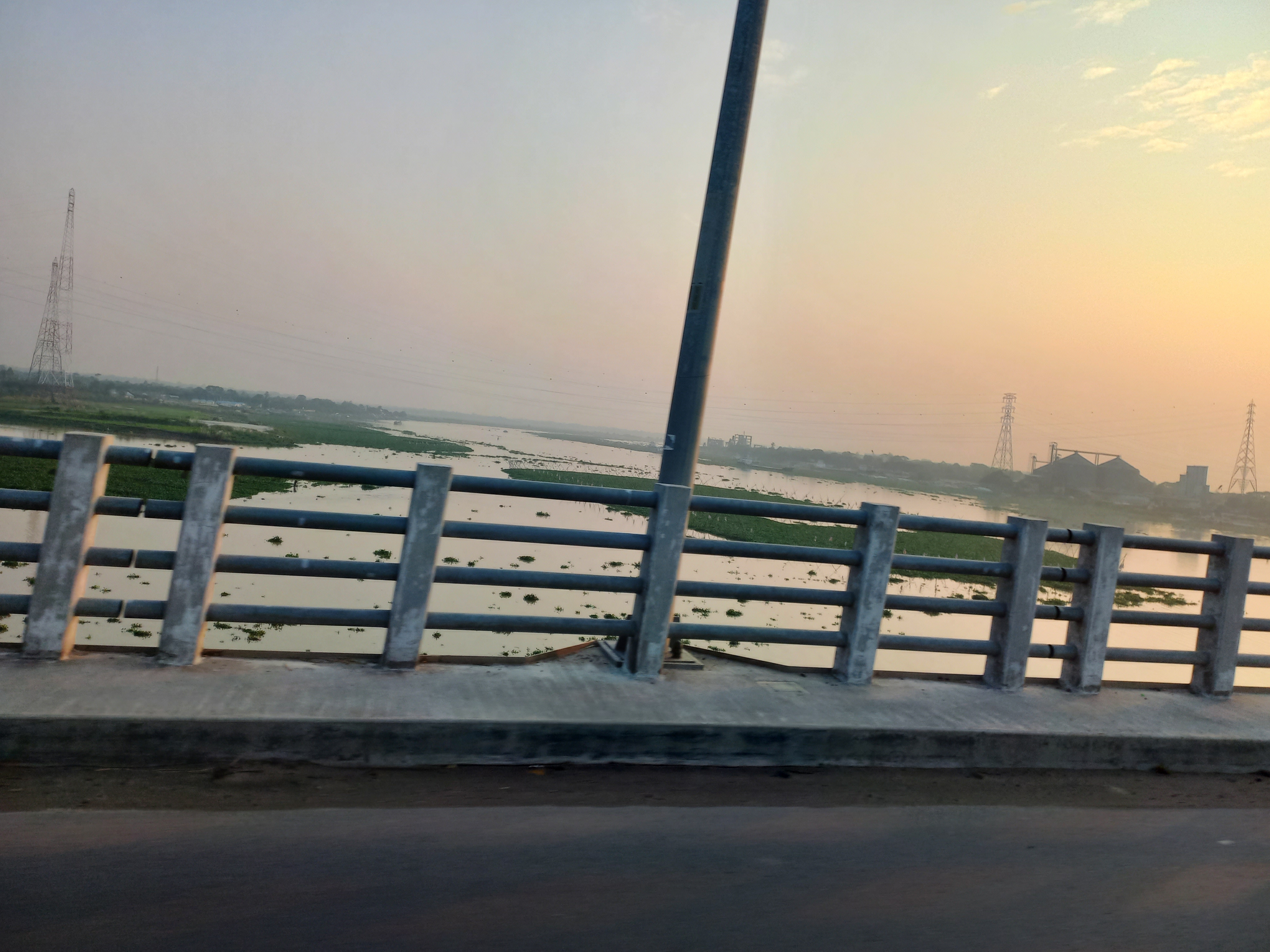
- Daudkandi Bridge

- Coordinates: 23°32′N 90°43′E
- Country: Bangladesh
- Division: Chittagong
- District: Comilla

Area
  - Total: 314.99 km^{2} (121.62 sq mi)

Population (2022)
  - Total: 406,405
  - Density: 1,290.2/km^{2} (3,341.6/sq mi)
- Time zone: UTC+6 (BST)
- Postal code: 3516
- Area code: 08023
- Website: daudkandi.comilla.gov.bd

Daudkandi Upazila mauza geocode map

Daudkandi (Bengali: দাউদকান্দি) is an upazila of Comilla District in the Division of Chittagong, Bangladesh.

== Geography ==
Daudkandi is located at 23.5333°N 90.7167°E. It has 69,014 households and a total area of 314.99 km^{2} which is located at the extreme near of the upazila by the Dhaka Chittagong Highway. Daudkandi village area is within the municipality and value of property here, like the rest of the municipality, have increased significantly.

== Demographics ==
Religions in Daudkandi Upazila (2022)
Religion	Percent
Islam	94.09%
Hinduism	5.90%
Other or not stated	0.01%

According to the 2022 Bangladeshi census, Daudkandi Upazila had 92,473 households and a population of 406,405. 10.14% of the population were under 5 years of age. Daudkandi had a literacy rate (age 7 and over) of 75.85%: 77.33% for males and 74.56% for females, and a sex ratio of 88.81 males for every 100 females. 64,615 (15.90%) lived in urban areas.

According to the 2011 Census of Bangladesh, Daudkandi Upazila had 69,014 households and a population of 349,910. 86,821 (24.81%) were under 10 years of age. Daudkandi has a literacy rate (age 7 and over) of 50.69%, compared to the national average of 51.8%, and a sex ratio of 1069 females per 1000 males. 46,256 (13.22%) lived in urban areas.

== Administration ==
Daudkandi Upazila is divided into Daudkandi Municipality and 16 union parishads: Baropara, Betessor, Dakshin Eliotgonj, Doulotpur, Goalmari, Gouripur, Maruka, Mohammadpur Paschim, Maligaon, Mohammadpur Purbo, Passgacia Pachim, Podua, Sundolpur, Uttar Daudkandi, Uttar Eliotgonj, and Zinglatoli. The union parishads are subdivided into 186 mauzas and 267 villages.

Daudkandi Municipality is subdivided into 9 wards and 26 mahallas.

Position	Name
Upazila Chairman	Major (Retd.) Mohammad Ali
Vice Chairman	Tarikul Islam Noyon
Woman Vice Chairman	Rujina Akther
Upazila Nirbahi Officer (UNO)	

== Notable residents ==
- Khondaker Mostaq Ahmad, 5th President of Bangladesh (15 August 1975 to 3 November 1975), was born at Dashpara village in 1919.
- Major General (Retd.) Mohammad Shubid Ali Bhuiyan has been the member parliament for constituency Comilla-1 since 2009.
- Dr. Khandaker Mosharraf Hossain, Minister of Health and Family Welfare (2001-2006) and the member of parliament for constituency Comilla-2 from 1991 until 2006, was born at Gayaspur village in 1946.
- M Osman Ali, founding member of the Awami Muslim League
- Ashraf Chowdhury, footballer, played for the Pakistan national football team, East Pakistan football team and Dhaka Mohammedan.
- Khondkar Nasim Ahmed, footballer, played for Victoria SC, East Bengal Club and Kolkata Mohammedan.

== See also ==
- Upazilas of Bangladesh
- Districts of Bangladesh
- Divisions of Bangladesh
