= Khandaker Mosharraf Hossain (born 1946) =

Bangladeshi politician

- খন্দকার মোশাররফ হোসেন
- Hossain at State Guest House Jamuna in Dhaka in 2025

Member of Parliament
- Incumbent
- Assumed office 17 February 2026
- Preceded by: Abdus Sabur
- Constituency: Comilla-1
- In office 5 March 1991 – 27 October 2006
- Preceded by: Abdur Rashid
- Succeeded by: M. K. Anwar
- Constituency: Comilla-2

Minister of Health and Family Welfare
- In office 10 October 2001 – 27 October 2006
- Preceded by: Salahuddin Yusuf
- Succeeded by: AFM Ruhal Haque

Minister of Home Affairs
- In office 19 March 1996 – 30 March 1996
- Preceded by: Abdul Matin Chowdhury
- Succeeded by: Muhammad Habibur Rahman (as Chief Adviser)

Minister of Power, Energy and Mineral Resources
- In office 20 March 1991 – 24 November 1995
- Preceded by: Wahiduddin Ahmed (as Adviser)
- Succeeded by: Nuruddin Khan

Personal details
- Born: 1 October 1946 (age 80) Goyeshpur, Tipperah district, Bengal Presidency,
- Party: Bangladesh Nationalist Party
- Spouse: Bilquis Akther Hossain
- Education: PhD (geology)
- Alma mater: University of Dhaka; University of London
- Occupation: Geologist and politician

Khandaker Mosharraf Hossain (born 1 October 1946) is a Bangladesh Nationalist Party politician and geologist. He is the incumbent member of Bangladesh Jatiya Sangsad from Comilla-1 constituency since February 2026. He also represented the Comilla-2 constituency as a Jatiya Sangsad member during 1991–2006.

== Early life and education ==
Khandaker Mosharraf Hossain was born on 1 October 1946 into the aristocratic Bengali Muslim Khandaker family of the village of Goyeshpur in Daudkandi Upazila in Comilla. His father was Khandaker Ashraf Ali, and his mother was Hosne Ara Hasna Hena.

Hossain earned an MSc degree from the University of Dhaka in 1968 and another MSc degree from Imperial College (then under the University of London) in 1970. He obtained the PhD degree in geology in 1973 from the University of London and DIC from Imperial College in 1974. He was the chairman of the Department of Geology, University of Dhaka from 1987 to 1991.

== Career ==
=== Academic ===
Hossain joined the University of Dhaka faculty as a junior lecturer in the Department of Geology in 1967. He became a professor in the same department in 1986.

=== Politics ===
Hossain has been a member of the Standing Committee of the Bangladesh Nationalist Party (BNP) since 1994. He was elected as a Jatiya Sangsad member from the Comilla-2 constituency in the national elections for four terms since 1991. He was the Minister of Energy and Mineral Resources and Home Affairs during 1991–1996. He was also the Minister of Health and Family Welfare during the preceding Four Party Alliance government.

Hossain was the chairman of the 56th World Health Assembly (WHA) in 2002. He was awarded the "World No Tobacco Award" by the World Health Organization during the 57th WHA for his contribution to the anti-tobacco campaign in Bangladesh.

On 12 March 2026, Hossain presided over the first sitting of the parliament as the senior-most member (pro tem speaker). In this role, he administered the oath to the newly elected members and chaired the session until the election of the Speaker of the Jatiya Sangsad.

== Controversies ==
Hossain has been involved in multiple controversies primarily related to corruption, graft, and money laundering allegations over the years. He was indicted in a money laundering case where authorities accused him of illegally acquiring wealth and transferring funds abroad, while separate investigations by the Anti-Corruption Commission (ACC) alleged the existence of significant undisclosed assets. In a money laundering case, he was accused of transferring approximately £800,000 (around Tk 9-10 crore) to a UK bank account and concealing assets worth over Tk 9 crore. In a separate graft case filed by the Anti-Corruption Commission (ACC), he and his son were accused of misappropriating about Tk 48-49 lakh from government development funds, including projects linked to international financing such as the World Bank.

== Personal life ==
Hossain is married to Bilquis Akther Hossain. They have two sons, and one daughter.
