= Roosevelt Lake (Minnesota) =

Lake in the state of Minnesota, United States

- Location within Minnesota
- Location: Cass County and Crow Wing County, Minnesota
- Coordinates: 46°48′21″N 93°57′52″W
- Type: lake

Lake Roosevelt is a lake in Cass County and Crow Wing County, Minnesota, in the United States.

Roosevelt Lake was named for Theodore Roosevelt, 26th President of the United States.

== See also ==
- List of lakes in Minnesota
