= Homna Upazila =

Homna হোমনা
- Upazila
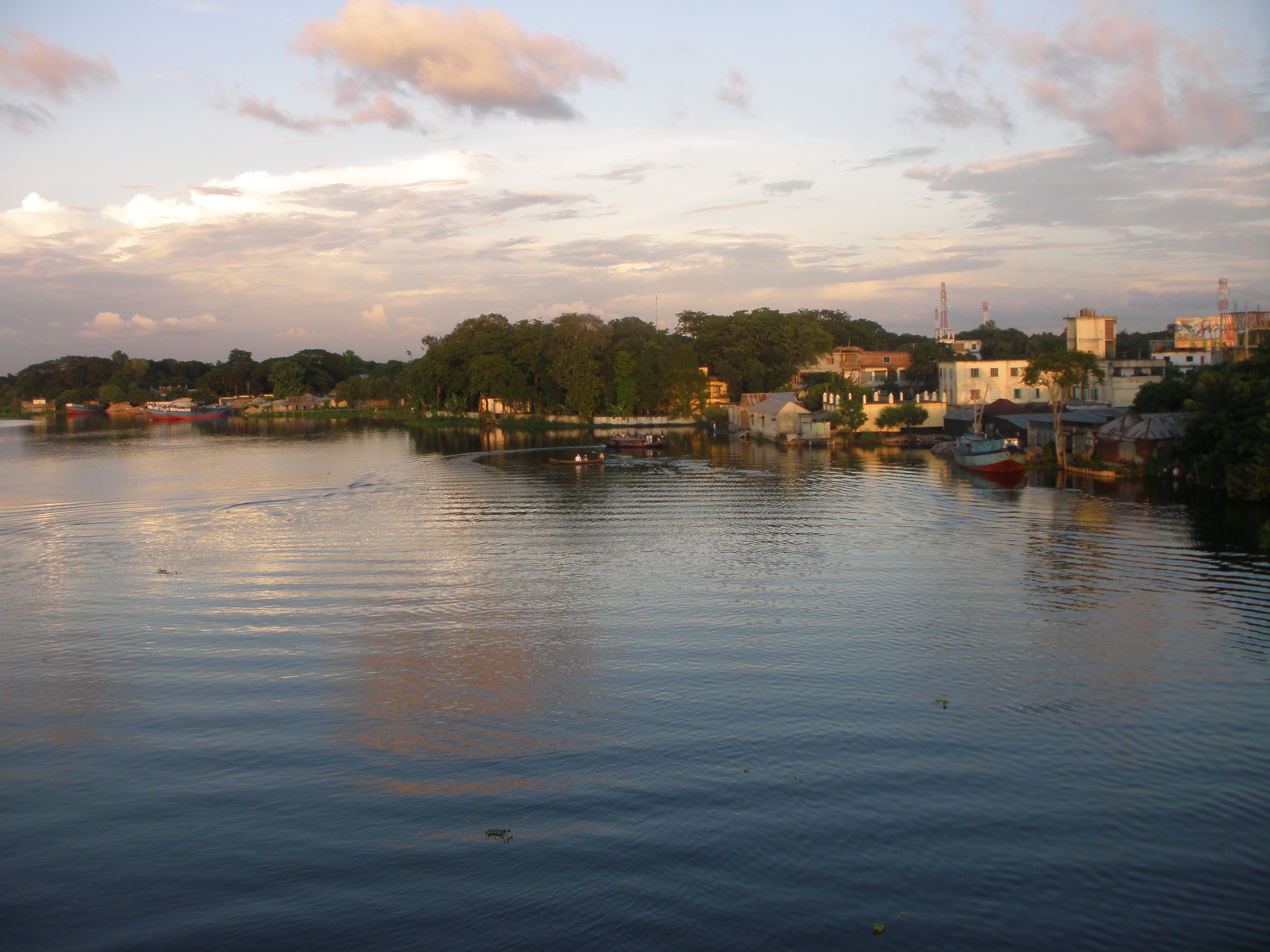
- Titas River in Homna Upazila

- Coordinates: 23°41′N 90°47.5′E
- Country: Bangladesh
- Division: Chattogram
- District: Cumilla

Area
  - Total: 142.78 km^{2} (55.13 sq mi)

Population (2022)
  - Total: 227,534
  - Density: 1,593.6/km^{2} (4,127.4/sq mi)
- Time zone: UTC+6 (BST)
- Postal code: 3546
- Area code: 081
- Website: homna.comilla.gov.bd

Homna Upazila mauza geocode map

Homna Upazila (Bengali: হোমনা উপজেলা) is an upazila of Cumilla District in the Division of Chattogram, Bangladesh. Homna thana (now an upazila) was established in 1918.

== Geography ==
Homna is located at 23.6833°N 90.7917°E. It has 36,814 households and a total area of 180.13 km^{2}. The river Meghna and branch of Titas named Sativanga passes through Homna.

== Demographics ==
Religions in Homna Upazila (2022)
Religion	Percent
Islam	94.77%
Hinduism	5.22%
Other or not stated	0.01%

According to the 2022 Bangladeshi census, Homna Upazila had 52,991 households and a population of 227,534. 10.68% of the population were under 5 years of age. Homna had a literacy rate (age 7 and over) of 68.82%: 70.42% for males and 67.54% for females, and a sex ratio of 83.74 males for every 100 females. 44,909 (19.74%) lived in urban areas.

According to the 2011 Census of Bangladesh, Homna Upazila had 40,370 households and a population of 206,386. 55,013 (26.66%) were under 10 years of age. Homna had a literacy rate (age 7 and over) of 39.67%, compared to the national average of 51.8%, and a sex ratio of 1059 females per 1000 males. 29,173 (14.14%) lived in urban areas.

== Administration ==
Homna Upazila is divided into Homna Municipality and nine union councils: Asadpur, Chanderchor, Dulalpur, Gharmora, Ghagutia, Joypur, Mathabhanga, Nilokhi and Vashania. The union councils are subdivided into 70 moujas and 154 villages. On the other hand, Homna Municipality is subdivided into 9 wards and 13 mahallas.

== See also ==
- Upazilas of Bangladesh
- Districts of Bangladesh
- Divisions of Bangladesh
