= Pankhali Union =

Pankhali Union পানখালী ইউনিয়ন
- Location of Pankhali Union in Bangladesh
- Coordinates: 22.6076°N 89.4847°E
- Country: Bangladesh
- Division: Khulna Division
- District: Khulna District
- Upazila: Dacope Upazila

Government
  - Type: Union Council
- Time zone: UTC+6 (BST)
- Website: pankhaliup.khulna.gov.bd

Pankhali Union (Bengali: পানখালী ইউনিয়ন) is a union parishad of Dacope Upazila in Khulna District of Bangladesh.

== Geography ==
The area of Kamarkhola Union is 29.20 square kilometers. To the north of the union are the Dhaki River and Bhodra River, Sutarkhali Union in the south, Bhadra river on the east and Dhaki river on the west.

== Demography ==
Religion (2022)
Religion	Percent
Islam	69.30%
Hinduism	30.66%
Others	0.04%
