= Sutarkhali Union =

Sutarkhali Union সুতারখালী ইউনিয়ন
- Location of Sutarkhali Union in Bangladesh
- Coordinates: 22.4623°N 89.4391°E
- Country: Bangladesh
- Division: Khulna Division
- District: Khulna District
- Upazila: Dacope Upazila

Government
  - Type: Union Council
- Time zone: UTC+6 (BST)
- Website: sutarkhaliup.khulna.gov.bd

Sutarkhali Union (Bengali: সুতারখালী ইউনিয়ন) is a union parishad of Dacope Upazila in Khulna District of Bangladesh.

== Geography ==
The area of Sutarkhali Union is 50 square kilometers.

== Educational institutions ==
=== Secondary school ===
- Dakshin Gunari Secondary School
- Kalabagi Sundarban Secondary School
- Nalian Secondary School
- Guarnari Shital Chandra Secondary School
- Sutarkhali Secondary School

=== Primary school ===
- 50 No. Gunari Hari Mohan Government Primary School
- Nalian Forest Government Primary School
- Dakshin Gunari Upen Nagar Government Primary School
- Sutarkhali Bainpara Mothernagar Government Primary School
- Purba Gunari Adarsha Government Primary School
- Sutarkhali 1 No. Government Primary School

== Geography ==
The area of Kamarkhola Union is 29.20 square kilometers. To the north of the union are the Dhaki River and Bhodra River, Sutarkhali Union in the south, Bhadra river on the east and Dhaki river on the west.

== Demography ==
Religion (2022)
Religion	Percent
Islam	75.47%
Hinduism	24.42%
Others	0.11%
