= Dacope Upazila =

Dacope দাকোপ
- Upazila
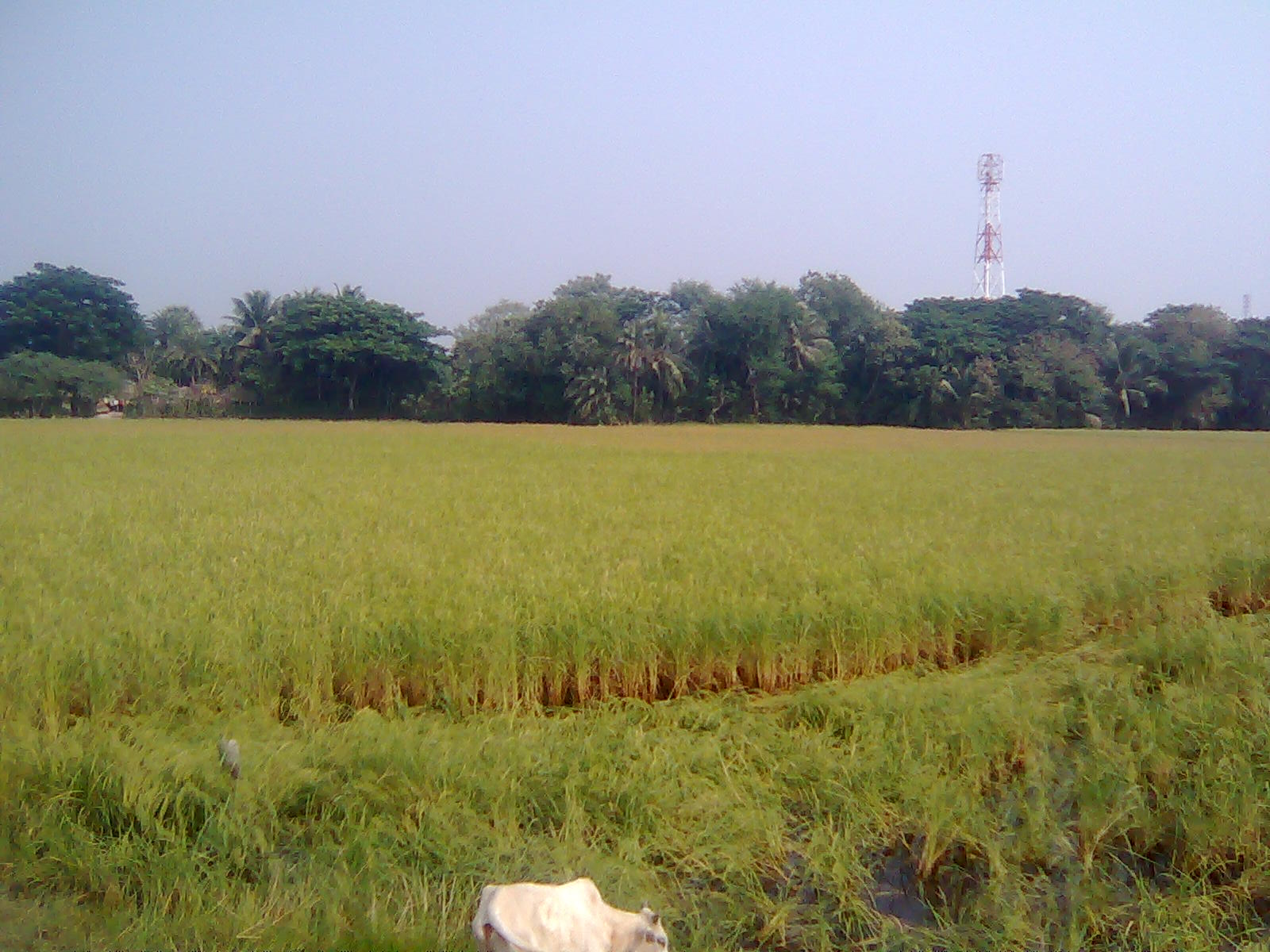
- Rice fields at Chalna

- Coordinates: 22°34.3′N 89°30.7′E
- Country: Bangladesh
- Division: Khulna
- District: Khulna

Area
  - Total: 991.56 km^{2} (382.84 sq mi)

Population (2022)
  - Total: 159,369
  - Density: 160.73/km^{2} (416.28/sq mi)
- Time zone: UTC+6 (BST)
- Postal code: 9270
- Website: dakop.khulna.gov.bd

Dacope Upazila mauza geocode map

Dacope (Bengali: দাকোপ) is an upazila of Khulna District in the Division of Khulna, Bangladesh. Dacope Thana was established in 1906 and was converted into an upazila in 1983.

== Geography ==
Dacope Upazila has a total area of 991.58 square kilometres (382.85 sq mi). It borders Batiaghata Upazila to the north, Rampal and Mongla Upazilas of Bagerhat District to the east, the confluence of the Pasur and Shibsa Rivers at the Kunga estuary to the south, and Koyra and Paikgachha Upazilas to the west. Other main rivers are the Manki and Bhadra.

== Demographics ==
According to the 2022 Bangladeshi census, Dacope Upazila had 42,186 households and a population of 159,369. 7.65% were under 5 years of age. Dacope had a literacy rate of 78.04%: 83.33% for males and 72.71% for females, with a sex ratio of 100.78 males per 100 females. 45,498 (28.54%) lived in urban areas.

Religions in Dacope Upazila (2022)
Religion	Percent
Hinduism	54.44%
Islam	43.43%
Christianity	2.12%

Population by religion in Union/Paurashava
Union/Paurashava	Muslim	Hindu	Others
Chalna Paurashava	8,368	7,400	440
Bajua Union	3,888	11,469	1,235
Banishanta Union	4,709	10,224	554
Dacope Union	77	7,319	9
Kailashganj Union	1,536	13,399	126
Kamarkhola Union	6,899	6,366	212
Loudob Union	2,096	7,252	673
Nalian Range	13	1	0
Pankhali Union	12,413	5,491	7
Sutarkhali Union	22,339	7,227	32
Tildanga Union	6,869	10,617	102

🟩 Muslim majority 🟧 Hindu majority

As of the 2011 Census of Bangladesh, Dacope upazila had 36,597 households and a population of 152,316. 26,092 (17.13%) were under 10 years of age. Dacope had an average literacy rate of 56.00%, compared to the national average of 51.8%, and a sex ratio of 997 females per 1000 males. 14,188 (9.31%) of the population lived in urban areas.

According to the 1991 Bangladesh census, Dacope had a population of 143,131. Males constituted 52.25% of the population, and females 47.75%. The population aged 18 or over was 78,759. Dacope had an average literacy rate of 37.6% (7+ years), compared to the national average of 32.4%.

It is the only Hindu majority upazila in Bangladesh, and the only upazila in the plains region where Muslims are in the minority.

== Administration ==
Dacope Upazila is divided into Chalna Municipality and ten union parishads: Bajua, Banishanta, Dacope, Kailashganj, Kamarkhola, Khulna Range, Loudob, Pankhali, Sutarkhali, and Tildanga Union. The union parishads are subdivided into 26 mauzas and 97 villages.

Chalna Municipality is subdivided into 9 wards and 15 mahallas. There is a War of Liberation mass killing site at Bazua High School courtyard and a War of Liberation monument, Smriti Amlan (in front of the upazila parisad building).

=== NGO activities ===
Operationally important NGOs are BRAC, NGO Forum For Public Health, Proshika, World Vision, Gonoshahajjo Sangstha, HEED Bangladesh, Step, and Prodipon.

== Education ==
=== Colleges ===
- Bajua Surendra Nath College, Dacope, Khulna
- Chalna College (1995), Chalna Bazar, Chalna Municipality, Dacope, Khulna
- Chalna M.M. Degree College
- Chalna Mohila Mohabidyaloy, Chalna Bazar, Dacope, Khulna
- L.B.K. Government Mohila College, Dacope, Khulna

=== High schools ===
- Paschim Kamini Basia Rashkhola High School
- Paschim Bajua Secondary School
- Batbunia Collegiate School
- Gunari Shital Chandra High School
- Abul Hosain Girls High School
- Burir Dabur SESDP Model High School
- Bajua Union High School
- Bajua Girls High School
- Bangabandhu High School
- Banisanta Pinak Pani High School
- Chalna Bazar Government Girls High School
- Chalna K C Pilot High School
- Chunkuri High School
- Dacope Girl's High School
- Dacope Shaheberabad Secondary School
- Dakshin Gunari High School
- Government Model School
- J P High School
- K G V J Sammilani Girls High School
- Kailashganj Secondary School
- Kalabagi Sundarban High School
- Kalinagar G C Memorial High School
- Kamini Basia G.L. High School
- Khona K B Secondary School
- Laksmikhola G.T. Pallimongal High School
- Laudobe Badamtala High School
- Loudove Banisanta High School
- Mohammad Ali High School
- Nalian High School
- Pankhali Momotajbegum Secondary School
- Ramnagar Binapani High School
- Shahid Smriti Junior Girls School
- Sonar Bangla High School
- Sreenagar High School
- Sundarban Adarsha High School
- Suterkhali High School
- Talukdar Akhter Faruque High School
- Tildanga Union Girl's High School
- Trimohani High School
- Yasin High School

== See also ==
- Upazilas of Bangladesh
- Districts of Bangladesh
- Divisions of Bangladesh
