= Kailashganj Union =

Kailashganj Union কৈলাশগঞ্জ ইউনিয়ন
- Location of Kailashganj Union in Bangladesh
- Coordinates: 22.5060°N 89.5235°E
- Country: Bangladesh
- Division: Khulna Division
- District: Khulna District
- Upazila: Dacope Upazila

Government
  - Type: Union Council
- Time zone: UTC+6 (BST)
- Website: koilashgonjup.khulna.gov.bd

Kailashganj Union (Bengali: কৈলাশগঞ্জ ইউনিয়ন) is a union parishad of Dacope Upazila in Khulna District of Bangladesh.

== Geography ==
Kailashganj Union has an area of 7214 acres (29.18 km^{2}).

== Demography ==
Religion (2022)
Religion	Percent
Hinduism	88.96%
Islam	10.20%
Christianity	0.83%
Others	0.01%
