= Loudob Union =

Loudob Union লাউডোব ইউনিয়ন
- Country: Bangladesh
- Division: Khulna Division
- District: Khulna District
- Upazila: Dacope Upazila

Government
  - Type: Union Council
  - Chairman: প্রফুল্ল সরদার
- Time zone: UTC+6 (BST)
- Website: www.laudobup.khulna.gov.bd

Loudob Union (Bengali: লাউডোব ইউনিয়ন) is a union parishad of Dacope Upazila in Khulna District of Bangladesh.

== Educational institutions ==
- Government L.B.K Women's College
- Buridabar Model Secondary School
- Loudob Badamtala Secondary School
- Loudob M, N Government Primary School
- Khutakhali Government Primary School
- Kalikabati Government Primary School
- B, K, (Barabank) Government Primary School
- Khutakhali Natun Bazar Government Primary School
- DNS Primary School

== Demography ==
Religion (2022)
Religion	Percent
Hinduism	72.37%
Islam	20.92%
Christianity	6.72%
Others	0.00%
