= Tildanga Union =

Tildanga Union তিলডাঙ্গা ইউনিয়ন
- Location of Tildanga Union in Bangladesh
- Coordinates: 22.5720°N 89.4531°E
- Country: Bangladesh
- Division: Khulna Division
- District: Khulna District
- Upazila: Dacope Upazila

Government
  - Type: Union Council
- Time zone: UTC+6 (BST)
- Website: Official Website

Tildanga Union (Bengali: তিলডাঙ্গা ইউনিয়ন) is a union parishad of Dacope Upazila in Khulna District of Bangladesh.

== Educational institutions ==
- Battunia Collegiate Secondary School
- Mozam Nagar Secondary School
- Tildanga Union Secondary Girls' School
- Kaminibasia G,L, Secondary School
- Tildonga Secondary School
- Kakarabunia Sirajia Dakhil Madrasa

== Demography ==
Religion (2022)
Religion	Percent
Hinduism	60.37%
Islam	39.06%
Christianity	0.58%
Others	0.00%
