= Batbunia Collegiate School =

Batbunia Secondary School
- বটবুনিয়া মাধ্যমিক বিদ্যালয়

Location
- Batbunia, Dacope Upazila, Khulna District; Bangladesh; 22.5706°N 89.4632°E

Information
- Type: secondary school
- Established: 1928
- Founder: Banamli Roy
- Headmaster: Sanjoy Kumar Roy(Previsionary)
- Faculty: 18
- Enrollment: 400
- Sports: Cricket, football

Batbunia Collegiate School (Bengali: বটবুনিয়া কলেজিয়েট স্কুল), formerly known as Batbunia High School, is one of the oldest secondary schools of the southern part of Khulna district under Dacope Upazila in Bangladesh. It was founded in 1928 by some of the influential persons of the locality.

== Location ==
Batbunia Collegiate School is located by the river Dhaki, on the north side of the Batbunia-Chalna main road. It is about half a kilometer away from Batbunia bazar.

== History ==
In August 2016, a digital classroom equipped with 17 laptops was installed at the school.

== Administration ==
The school is governed by a managing committee. Most of the members of the managing committee are elected by the vote of guardians and the secretary is selected by the elected members. The committee includes the school headmaster and assistant headmaster.

== Academics ==
Batbunia Collegiate School offers secondary education from class 6 to class 10 in Bengali medium under the National Curriculum. Students take part in Junior School Certificate (JSC) and Secondary School Certificate (SSC) examinations from the school. The institution provides education in science, business studies and humanities at secondary level (class 9 and 10).

== Festivals ==
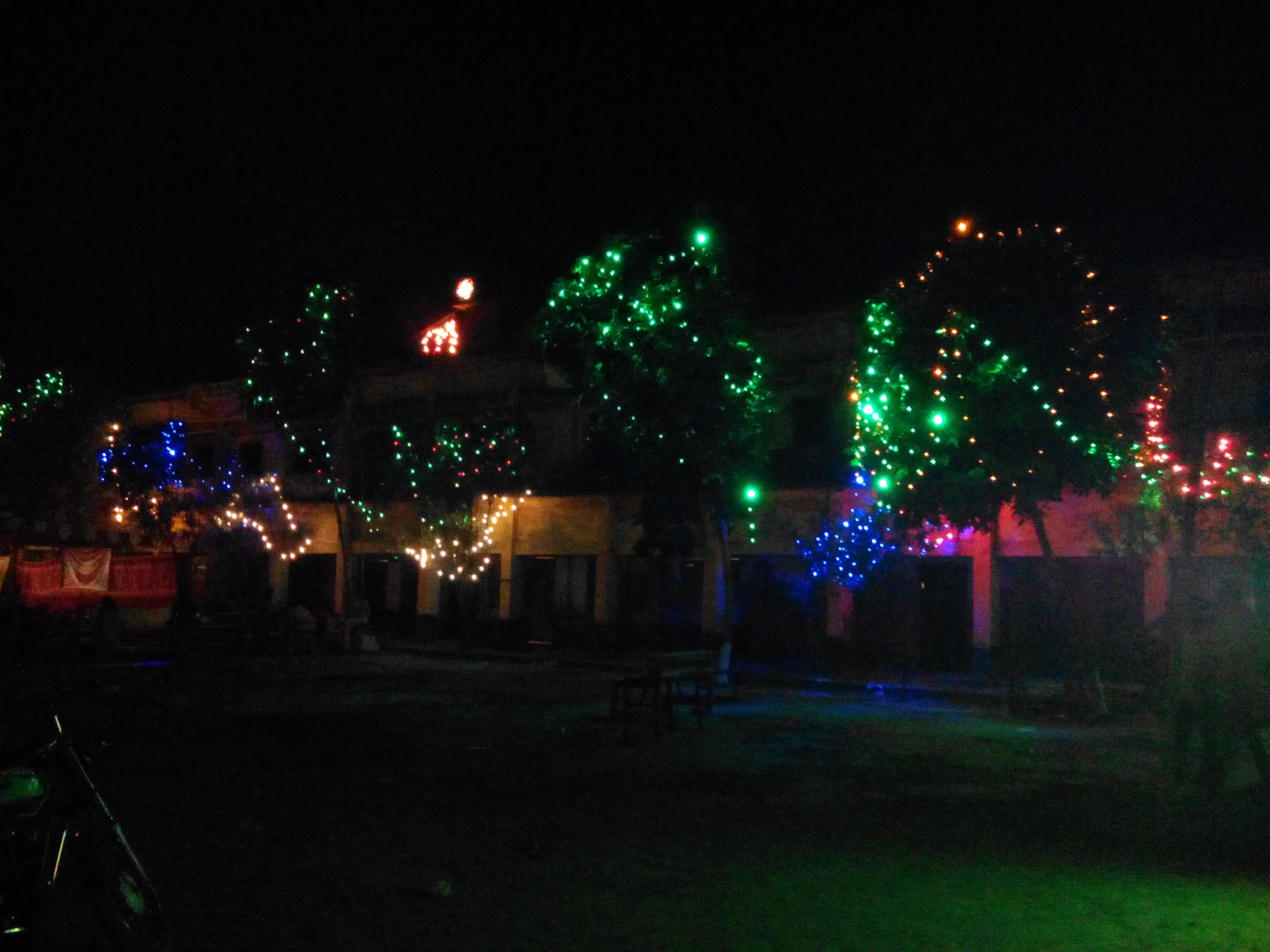
Light works during Durga Puja

Batbunia Collegiate School celebrates social and religious festivals like Pohela Boishakh, Durga Puja and Saraswati Puja where people of the entire locality participate. Specially Durga puja is celebrated extendedly in the school for years which has now become a tradition.

== See also ==
- List of educational institutions in Khulna
- List of schools in Bangladesh
- Education in Bangladesh
