= Bajua Union =

Bajua Union বাজুয়া ইউনিয়ন
- Location of Bajua Union in Bangladesh
- Coordinates: 22.5310°N 89.5682°E
- Country: Bangladesh
- Division: Khulna Division
- District: Khulna District
- Upazila: Dacope Upazila

Government
  - Type: Union Council
- Time zone: UTC+6 (BST)
- Website: www.dakop.khulna.gov.bd

Bajua Union (Bengali: বাজুয়া ইউনিয়ন) is a union parishad of Dacope Upazila in Khulna District of Bangladesh.

== Geography ==
The area of Bajua Union is 30.58 square kilometers.

== Demography ==
Religion (2022)
Religion	Percent
Hinduism	69.12%
Islam	23.43%
Christianity	7.42%
Others	0.02%
