= Banishanta Union =

Banishanta Union লাউডোব ইউনিয়ন
- Location of Banishanta Union in Bangladesh
- Coordinates: 22.4898°N 89.5707°E
- Country: Bangladesh
- Division: Khulna Division
- District: Khulna District
- Upazila: Dacope Upazila

Government
  - Type: Union Council
- Time zone: UTC+6 (BST)
- Website: www.banishantaup.khulna.gov.bd

Banishanta Union (Bengali: বানিশান্তা ইউনিয়ন) is a union parishad of Dacope Upazila in Khulna District of Bangladesh.

== Geography ==
Banishanta Union has an area of 6954 acres (18.12 km^{2}).

== Demography ==
Religion (2022)
Religion	Percent
Hinduism	66.02%
Islam	30.41%
Christianity	3.57%
Others	0.01%
