= Govinda Temple, Hojai =

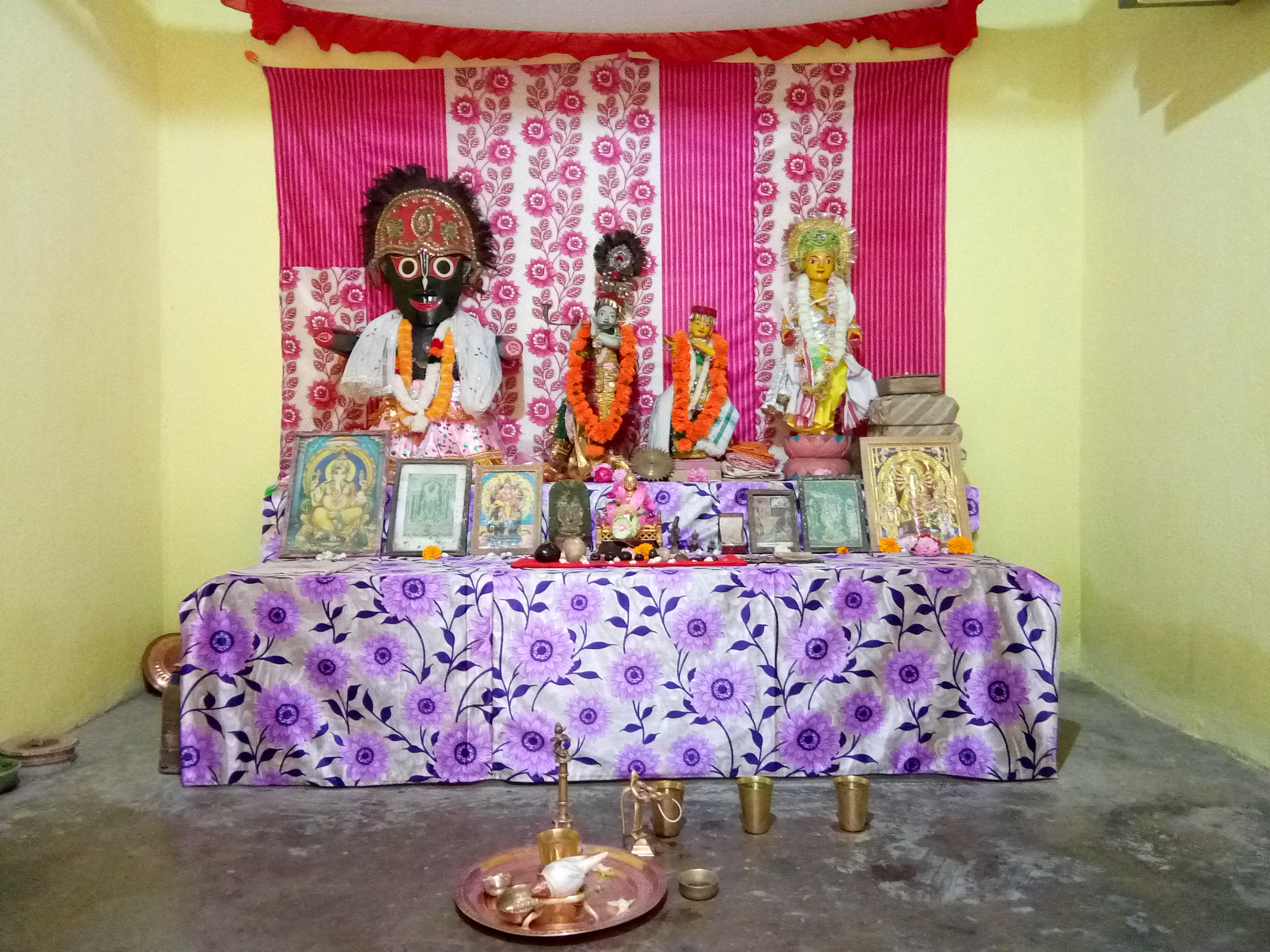

Jagannath Govinda Temple is a Hindu temple in Gauranagar, in the Indian state of Assam which was established in 1928.
