= Hinduism in Bangladesh =

Bangladeshi Hindus Bāṅlādēśī Hindu বাংলাদেশী হিন্দু

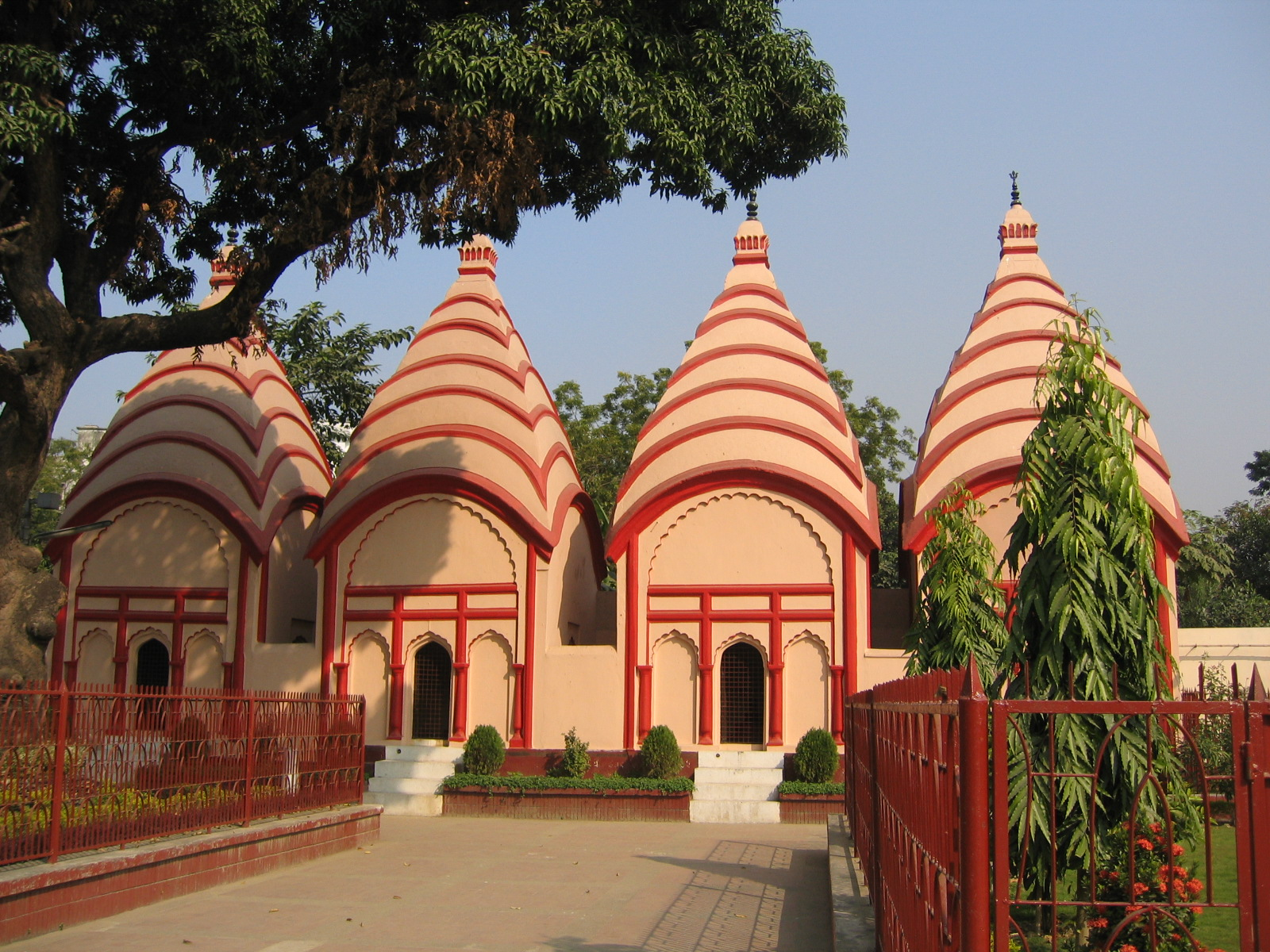
- Dhakeshwari National Temple in Dhaka

Total population
- 13,130,000 (2022 Census) ▲ (7.95% of the country's population) ▼

Regions with significant populations
- Throughout Bangladesh
- Dhaka Division: 2,766,874 (6.26%)
- Rangpur Division: 2,290,450 (12.98%)
- Chittagong Division: 2,196,947 (6.61%)
- Khulna Division: 2,007,502 (11.54%)
- Sylhet Division: 1,491,315 (13.51%)
- Rajshahi Division: 1,159,197 (5.70%)
- Barisal Division: 750,177 (8.24%)
- Mymensingh Division: 481,742 (3.92%)

Religions
- Hinduism (majority); Tribal religions identified as Hindus (minority)

Languages
- Sanskrit (Liturgical); Bangla and other tribal languages

Hinduism is the second-largest religion in Bangladesh, accounting for about 7.95% of the country's population, approximately 13.1 million people, as per the 2022 census of Bangladesh. Around 21% of the Bangladeshi diaspora follow Hinduism.

Bangladesh has the world's third-largest Hindu population, after India and Nepal. Hinduism is the second-largest religion in 61 of 64 districts in Bangladesh. Bengali Hindus form the largest Hindu community of Bangladesh, whose culture shares similarities with Hinduism in West Bengal. Goddess veneration is the most common tradition, though syncretism with Islamic traditions isn't uncommon. Durga Puja is the largest religious festival for Bangladeshi Hindus. Multiple historic and contemporary Hindu temples are scattered across the country. Hindu family law is the primary law that regulates the personal affairs of Bangladeshi Hindus.

Bangladesh's Hindu community has faced persecution since the partition of India in 1947, which continued after the independence of Bangladesh in 1971. During the 1971 Bangladesh genocide, 300,000 to 3 million people were killed (disproportionately Hindus) and mass rapes of 300-400,000 women (predominantly Hindu) were perpetrated, as well as Hindu temple desecrations, property destruction, and the flight of 8-10 million Hindu refugees to India. Hindu population of Bangladesh also dropped from 33% in 1901 to 7.9% in 2022.

== Demographics ==
Percentage and population of Hinduism in Bangladesh
Year	Percentage (%)	Hindu Population	Total population	Notes
1901	33.00%	9,546,240	28,927,626	Eastern Bengal region
1911	31.50%	9,939,825	31,555,363	Before partition
1921	30.60%	10,176,030	33,254,607	Before partition
1931	29.40%	10,466,988	35,604,189	Before partition
1941	28.00%	11,759,160	41,999,221	Before partition
1951	22.05%	9,239,603	42,062,462	During Pakistani rule
1961	18.50%	9,379,669	50,804,914	During Pakistani rule
1974	13.50%	9,673,048	71,478,543	After independence of Bangladesh
1981	12.13%	10,570,245	87,120,487	After independence of Bangladesh
1991	10.51%	11,178,866	106,315,583	After independence of Bangladesh
2001	9.60%	11,822,581	123,151,871	After independence of Bangladesh
2011	8.54%	12,299,940	144,043,697	After independence of Bangladesh
2022	7.95%	13,130,109	165,158,616	After independence of Bangladesh
Source: Census of India 1901–1941, Census of East Pakistan 1951–1961, Bangladesh Government Census 1974-2022

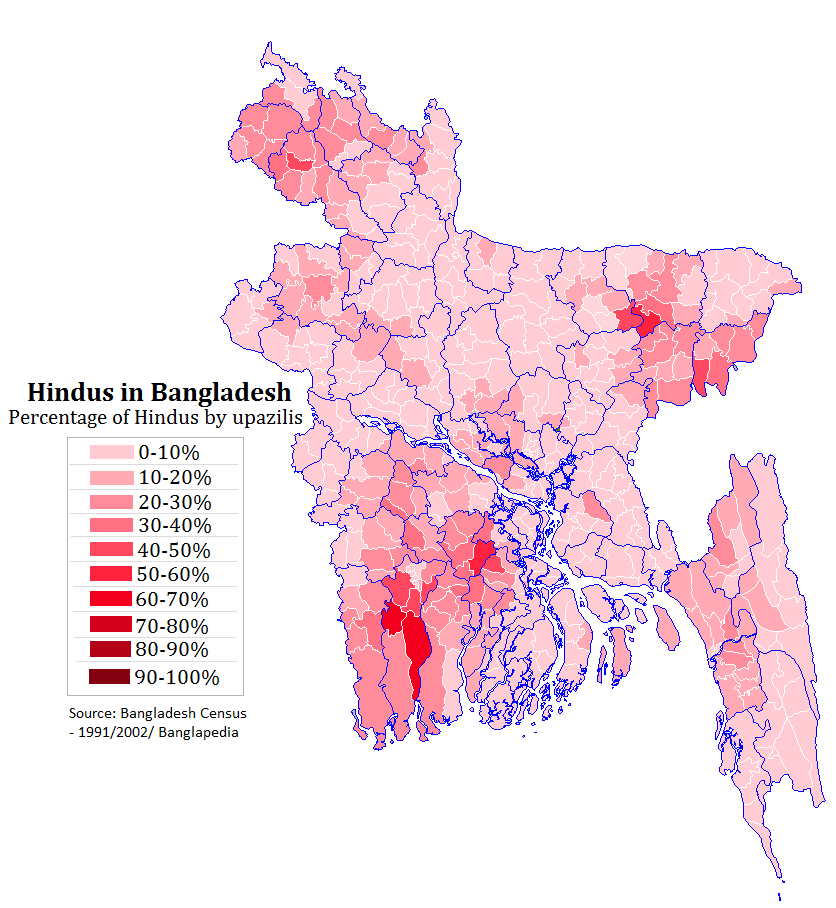
Map of percentage of Bangladeshi Hindus by Upazila or Sub-district (2011 Census)

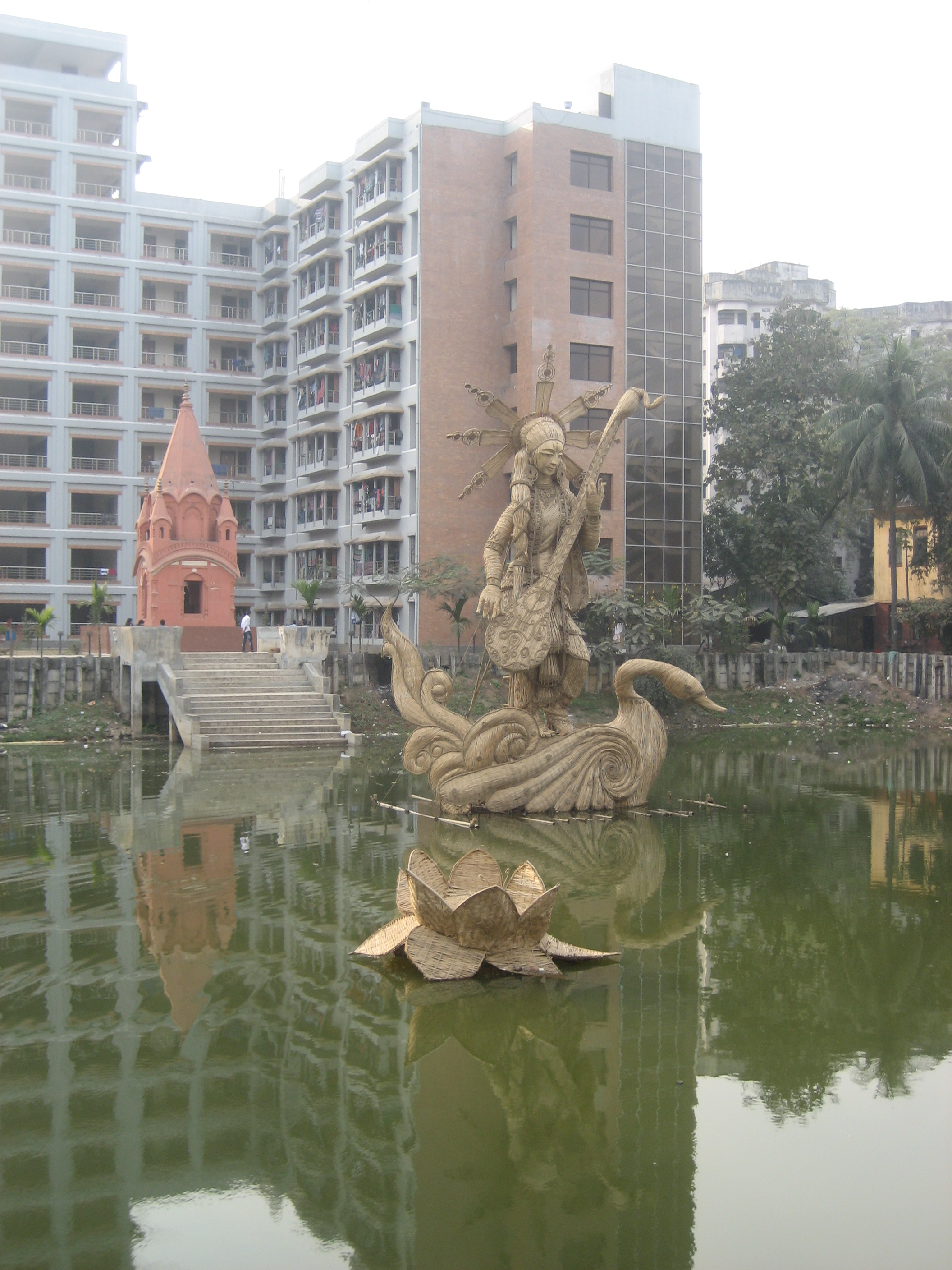
Statue of Hindu Goddess Saraswati, Dhaka University

According to the 2001 Bangladesh census, there were around 11.82 million Hindus in Bangladesh, constituting 9.6% of the population, which at the time was 123.15 million. The Bangladesh 2011 census states that approximately 12.73 million people responded that they were Hindus, constituting 8.54% of the total 149.77 million. While the 2022 Census of Bangladesh put the number of Hindus in Bangladesh at 13.1 million out of a total population of 165.1 million, thus constituting 7.95% of the population. According to a report published by a local daily newspaper in Bangladesh, the Hindu population in the country has reduced by nearly one million between 2001 and 2011. The reduction mainly happened in nine districts: Bhola, Barisal, Jhalokati, Pirojpur, Bagerhat, Narail, Gopalganj, Rajbari, and Manikganj. The United States Commission on International Religious Freedom has said that Hindus constitute merely 7% of the population in Bangladesh, as per the latest 2016 figures. Hindus in Bangladesh in the late 2000s were almost evenly distributed in all regions, with large concentrations in Gopalganj, Dinajpur, Sylhet, Sunamganj, Mymensingh, Khulna, Jessore, Chittagong, and parts of Chittagong Hill Tracts. In the capital city of Dhaka, Hindus are the second-largest religious community after the Muslims, and the largest concentration of Hindus can be found in and around Shankhari Bazaar in the old city.

In 2013, Amnesty International reported that the rise of more explicitly Islamist political formations in Bangladesh during the 1990s had resulted in many Hindus being intimidated or attacked, and that fairly substantial numbers were leaving the country for India.

In 1901, Hindus constituted 33% of the population of what is now Bangladesh. In 1941, about 28% of the population were Hindus. Their proportion declined to 22% in 1951 after the Partition of India in 1947, as Hindus migrated from East Bengal to India. Wealthy Hindus who migrated lost their land and assets through the East Bengal Evacuees Act. Poor and middle-class Hindus who were left behind were targets of discriminatory new laws. At the outbreak of the 1965 India-Pakistan war, the Defense of Pakistan Ordinance, and later the Enemy (Custody and Registration) Order II, labeled Hindus as the "enemy" and expropriated their property. The 1974 census of Bangladesh showed that the population of Hindus had fallen to 13.5%. Even after independence, the Hindus were branded "Indian stooges" and untrustworthy citizens.

Since 1971, the Hindu percentage has continued to decline, forming 8.5% of the population as of 2011. The fall in the share of the total population has been attributed to outward migration, and the fertility rate for Hindus remaining consistently lower than Muslims (2.1 versus 2.3 as of 2014).

=== Hinduism by divisions ===
Hindu Population across divisions of Bangladesh (2022)
Division	Hindu Population	Total population	Percentage (%)
Barisal	750,177	9,100,104	8.24%
Chittagong	2,196,947	33,202,357	6.61%
Dhaka	2,766,874	44,215,759	6.26%
Khulna	2,007,502	17,415,924	11.53%
Mymensingh	481,742	12,225,449	3.94%
Rajshahi	1,159,197	20,353,116	5.70%
Rangpur	2,290,450	17,610,955	13.01%
Sylhet	1,491,315	11,034,952	13.51%

According to the Bangladesh Bureau of Statistics report, Khulna division has the highest decline in Hindu population (1.33%) from 2011 to 2022. In 2011, 12.85% of the population of the division were Hindus. This rate has come down to 11.52% in 2022. Among the eight divisions, Khulna has the fourth-highest Hindu population. According to the 2022 census, Sylhet Division has the highest Hindu population of 13.5%, but the ratio was 14.05% in 2011. In Rangpur Division, the Hindu population has decreased from 13.21% in 2011 to 12.98% in 2022. Mymensingh Division has the lowest percentage of people belonging to the Hindu community (3.92%) as of 2022.

=== Hinduism by districts ===
Hindu population across districts of Bangladesh (2022)
District	Hindu population	Total population	Percentage (2022)	Percentage (2011)	Change (percentage points, 2011–2022)
Barguna	69,492	1,010,531	6.88%	7.69%	−0.81
Barisal	275,263	2,570,446	10.71%	11.69%	−0.98
Bhola	55,535	1,932,518	2.87%	3.44%	−0.57
Jhalokati	61,352	661,160	9.28%	10.04%	−0.76
Patuakhali	107,553	1,727,254	6.23%	6.87%	−0.64
Pirojpur	180,982	1,198,195	15.10%	16.72%	−1.62
Bandarban	16,501	481,106	3.43%	3.38%	+0.05
Brahmanbaria	220,960	3,306,563	6.68%	7.46%	−0.78
Chandpur	146,524	2,635,748	5.56%	6.02%	−0.46
Chattogram	982,604	9,169,465	10.72%	11.31%	−0.59
Cumilla	269,214	6,212,216	4.33%	4.79%	−0.46
Cox's Bazar	108,166	2,823,268	3.83%	4.26%	−0.43
Feni	91,160	1,648,896	5.58%	5.83%	−0.25
Khagrachhari	119,706	714,119	16.76%	16.81%	−0.05
Lakshmipur	61,846	1,937,948	3.19%	3.44%	−0.25
Noakhali	147,154	3,625,442	4.06%	4.52%	−0.46
Rangamati	33,112	647,586	5.11%	5.07%	+0.04
Dhaka	672,269	14,734,701	4.56%	4.70%	−0.14
Faridpur	182,561	2,162,879	8.44%	9.43%	−0.99
Gazipur	263,490	5,263,450	5.01%	5.19%	−0.18
Gopalganj	348,974	1,295,057	26.95%	30.18%	−3.23
Kishoreganj	158,778	3,267,626	4.86%	5.44%	−0.58
Madaripur	144,904	1,293,027	11.21%	12.10%	−0.89
Manikganj	138,875	1,558,025	8.91%	9.34%	−0.43
Munshiganj	122,238	1,625,416	7.52%	7.93%	−0.41
Narayanganj	144,105	3,909,138	4.89%	4.89%	0.00
Narsingdi	184,309	2,224,944	4.71%	5.65%	−0.94
Rajbari	110,569	1,189,818	9.29%	10.19%	−0.90
Shariatpur	42,724	1,294,562	3.30%	3.58%	−0.28
Tangail	257,351	4,037,608	6.37%	6.83%	−0.46
Bagerhat	264,229	1,613,076	16.38%	18.35%	−1.97
Chuadanga	27,804	1,234,054	2.25%	2.35%	−0.10
Jessore	313,592	3,076,144	10.19%	11.22%	−1.03
Jhenaidah	168,444	2,005,849	8.40%	9.48%	−1.08
Khulna	542,417	2,613,385	20.76%	22.68%	−1.92
Kushtia	58,771	2,149,692	2.73%	2.92%	−0.19
Magura	162,138	1,033,115	15.69%	17.92%	−2.23
Meherpur	8,497	705,356	1.20%	1.20%	0.00
Narail	124,465	788,671	15.78%	18.65%	−2.87
Satkhira	337,145	2,196,582	15.35%	17.70%	−2.35
Jamalpur	39,827	2,499,738	1.59%	1.69%	−0.10
Mymensingh	202,440	5,899,005	3.43%	3.58%	−0.15
Netrokona	202,648	2,324,853	8.72%	9.30%	−0.58
Sherpur	36,827	1,501,853	2.45%	2.57%	−0.12
Bogra	216,657	3,734,297	5.80%	6.04%	−0.24
Chapai Nawabganj	72,178	1,835,528	3.93%	4.04%	−0.11
Joypurhat	87,595	956,431	9.16%	8.83%	+0.33
Naogaon	321,341	2,784,599	11.54%	11.07%	+0.47
Natore	107,124	1,859,922	5.76%	6.08%	−0.32
Pabna	74,265	2,909,624	2.55%	2.91%	−0.36
Rajshahi	133,514	2,915,009	4.58%	4.72%	−0.14
Sirajganj	146,523	3,357,706	4.37%	4.76%	−0.39
Dinajpur	648,326	3,315,236	19.56%	19.51%	+0.05
Gaibandha	177,593	2,562,233	6.93%	7.06%	−0.13
Kurigram	143,381	2,329,160	6.16%	6.55%	−0.39
Lalmonirhat	185,322	1,428,406	12.97%	13.90%	−0.93
Nilphamari	327,333	2,092,568	15.64%	15.99%	−0.35
Panchagarh	184,951	1,179,843	15.68%	16.54%	−0.86
Rangpur	283,964	3,169,614	8.96%	8.98%	−0.02
Thakurgaon	339,580	1,533,895	22.14%	22.26%	−0.12
Habiganj	374,104	2,358,886	15.86%	16.87%	−1.01
Maulvibazar	519,263	2,123,447	24.45%	24.59%	−0.14
Sunamganj	315,044	2,695,496	11.69%	12.94%	−1.25
Sylhet	282,904	3,857,123	7.33%	7.23%	+0.10

=== Hinduism by upazilas ===
According to the 2022 census, there are 43 upazilas with a Hindu population percentage above 20%. There are also several notable upazilas with a Hindu percentage between 17% and 20%. They are listed below according to percentage.

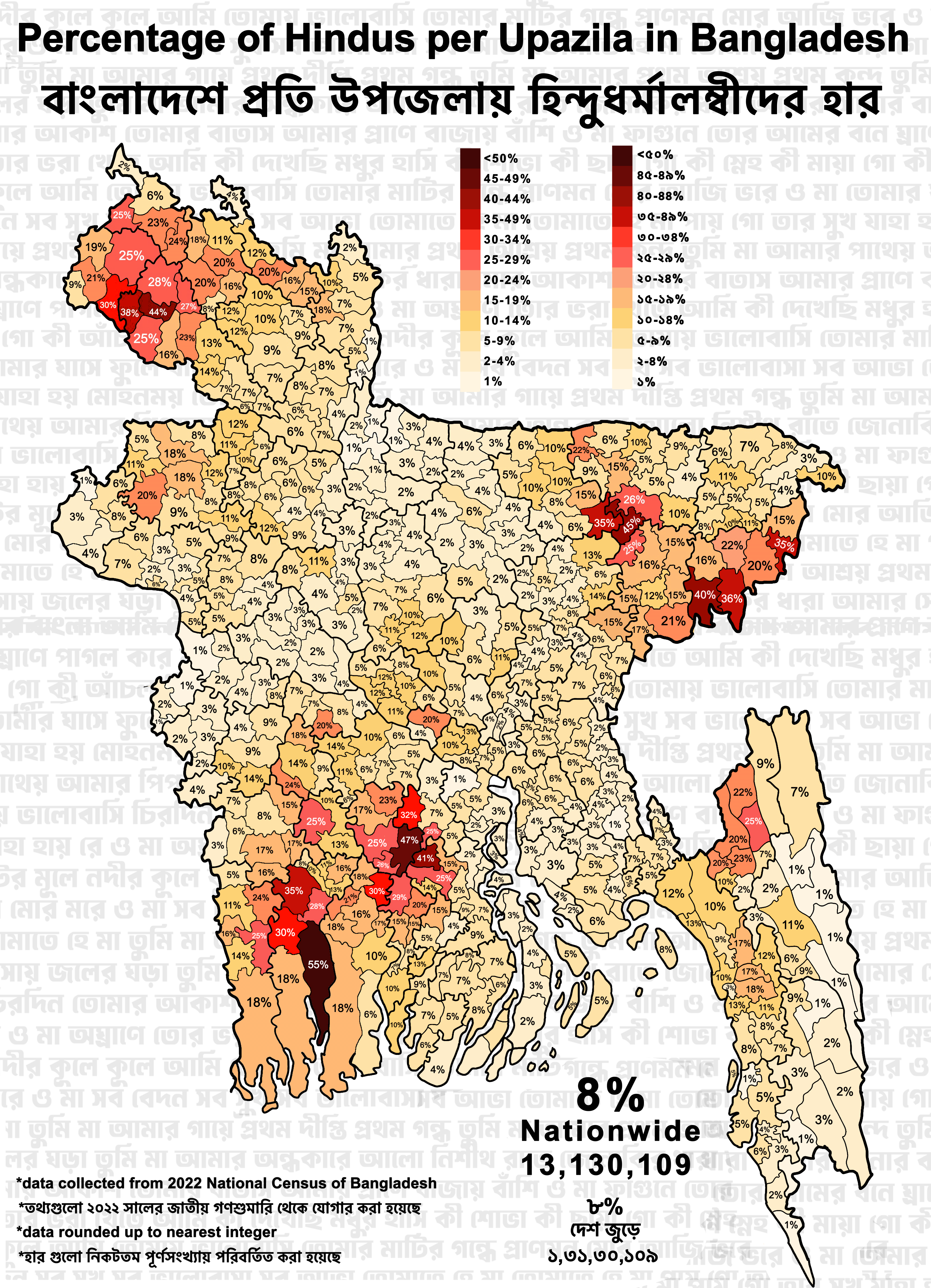
Percentage of Hindus by Upazila according to the 2022 Census

Dacope Upazila is the only Hindu majority Upazila in Bangladesh.

Upazila	District	Percentage of Hinduism
Dacope Upazila	Khulna District	54.44%
Kotalipara Upazila	Gopalganj District	47.10%
Shalla Upazila	Sunamganj District	44.19%
Kaharole Upazila	Dinajpur District	43.59%
Agailjhara Upazila	Barishal District	40.47%
Sreemangal Upazila	Moulvibazar District	39.49%
Bochaganj Upazila	Dinajpur District	38.07%
Dumuria Upazila	Khulna District	34.72%
Khaliajuri Upazila	Netrokona District	33.69%
Juri Upazila	Moulvibazar District	33.40%
Rajoir Upazila	Madaripur District	30.85%
Chitalmari Upazila	Bagerhat District	30.23%
Kamalganj Upazila	Moulvibazar District	30.22%
Paikgachha Upazila	Khulna District	28.99%
Nazirpur Upazila	Pirojpur District	28.43%
Pirganj Upazila	Thakurgaon District	28.31%
Batiaghata Upazila	Khulna District	27.56%
Birganj Upazila	Dinajpur District	27.47%
Khansama Upazila	Dinajpur District	27.12%
Tungipara Upazila	Gopalganj District	26.26%
Derai Upazila	Sunamganj District	25.44%
Birol Upazila	Dinajpur District	25.20%
Khagrachhari Sadar Upazila	Khagrachhari District	24.76%
Atwari Upazila	Panchagarh District	24.72%
Thakurgaon Sadar Upazila	Thakurgaon District	24.38%
Dasar Upazila	Madaripur District	24.24%
Debiganj Upazila	Panchagarh District	24.17%
Shalikha Upazila	Magura District	23.99%
Ajmiriganj Upazila	Habiganj District	23.98%
Ujirpur Upazila	Barishal District	23.46%
Narail Sadar Upazila	Narail District	23.37%
Gopalganj Sadar Upazila	Gopalganj District	23.41%
Tala Upazila	Satkhira District	23.36%
Ashashuni Upazila	Satkhira District	23.36%
Muksudpur Upazila	Gopalganj District	23.07%
Chirirbandar Upazila	Dinajpur District	22.92%
Guimara Upazila	Khagrachhari District	22.51%
Boda Upazila	Panchagarh District	22.52%
Madhyanagar Upazila	Sunamganj District	22.07%
Rajnagar Upazila	Moulvibazar District	21.95%
Panchhari Upazila	Khagrachhari District	21.46%
Fakirhat Upazila	Bagerhat District	20.83%
Ranishankail Upazila	Thakurgaon District	20.58%
Matiranga Upazila	Khagrachhari District	19.73%
Baliakandi Upazila	Rajbari District	19.60%
Ramgarh Upazila	Khagrachhari District	19.16%
Nawabganj Upazila	Dhaka District	18.95%
Niamatpur Upazila	Naogaon District	18.56%
Mohadevpur Upazila	Naogaon District	17.89%
Patnitala Upazila	Naogaon District	17.82%

=== Hindu majority unions ===
There are 81 hindu majority union in Bangladesh out of 4,579.

Hindu majority Union
District	Upazila	Unions
Gopalganj District(15)	Kotalipara Upazila(6)	1.Kalabari Union; 2.Kandi Union; 3.Radhaganj Union; 4.Ramshil Union; 5.Sadullapur Union; 6.Suagram Union
Gopalganj District(15)	Muksudpur Upazila(3)	1.Jalirpar Union; 2.Kasalia Union; 3.Ujani Union
Gopalganj District(15)	Gopalganj Sadar Upazila(3)	1.Boultali Union; 2.Sahapur Union; 3.Satpar Union
Gopalganj District(15)	Kashiani Upazila(2)	1.Hatiara Union; 2.Singa Union
Gopalganj District(15)	Tungipara Upazila(1)	1.Gopalpur Union
Khulna District(13)	Dacope Upazila(6)	1.Bajua Union; 2.Banishanta Union; 3.Dacope Union; 4.Kailashganj Union; 5.Loudob Union; 6.Tildanga Union
Khulna District(13)	Dumuria Upazila(3)	1.Bhandarpara Union; 2.Magurkhali Union; 3.Rangpur Union
Khulna District(13)	Batiaghata Upazila(2)	1.Batiaghata Union; 2 Gangarampur Union
Khulna District(13)	Paikgachha Upazila(2)	1.Deluti Union; 2.Lata Union
Dinajpur District(8)	Kaharole Upazila(4)	1.Dabar Union; 2.Ramchandrapur Union; 3.Rasulpur Union; 4.Targaon Union
Dinajpur District(8)	Biral Upazila(2)	1.Mangalpur Union; 2.Rajarampur Union
Dinajpur District(8)	Birganj Upazila(1)	1.Mohammadpur union
Dinajpur District(8)	Bochaganj Upazila(1)	1.Ishania Union
Moulvibazar District(7)	Juri Upazila(3)	1.Fultala Union; 2.Pashchim Juri Union; 3.Purba Juri Union
Moulvibazar District(7)	Sreemangal Upazila(3)	1.Kalighat Union; 2.Rajghat Union; 3.Satgaon Union
Moulvibazar District(7)	Kamalganj Upazila(1)	1.Madhabpur Union
Madaripur District(5)	Rajoir Upazila(4)	1.Amgram Union; 2.Kadambari Union; 3.Khalia Union; 4.Rajoir Union
Madaripur District(5)	Dasar Upazila(1)	1.Nabagram Union
Chattogram District(4)	Patiya Upazila(2)	1.Dhalghat Union; 2.Kelishahar Union
Chattogram District(4)	Anwara Upazila(1)	1.Anwara Union
Chattogram District(4)	Boalkhali Upazila(1)	1.Amuchia Union
Thakurgaon District(4)	Thakurgaon Sadar Upazila(2)	1.Akcha Union; 2.Dholarhat Union
Thakurgaon District(4)	Baliadangi Upazila(1)	1.Dhantala Union
Thakurgaon District(4)	Pirganj Upazila(1)	1.Daulatpur Union
Barishal District(4)	Agailjhara Upazila(2)	1.Bakal Union; 2.Rajihar Union
Barishal District(4)	Wazirpur Upazila(2)	1.Harta Union; 2.Jalla Union
Bagerhat District(3)	Chitalmari Upazila(1)	1.Charbaniari Union
Bagerhat District(3)	Fakirhat Upazila(1)	1.Mulghar Union
Bagerhat District(3)	Rampal Upazila(1)	1.Hurka Union
Khagrachhari District(3)	Khagrachhari Sadar Upazila(1)	1.Bhaibonchhara Union
Khagrachhari District(3)	Matiranga Upazila(1)	1.Matiranga Union
Khagrachhari District(3)	Guimara Upazila(1)	1.Guimara Union
Jessore District(3)	Manirampur Upazila(2)	1.Haridaskati Union; 2.Kultia Union
Jessore District(3)	Abhaynagar Upazila(1)	1.Sundoli Union
Kishoreganj District(2)	Austagram Upazila(1)	1.Kalma Union
Kishoreganj District(2)	Itna Upazila(1)	1.Dhanpur Union
Pirojpur District(2)	Nazirpur Upazila(1)	1.Dirgha Union
Pirojpur District(2)	Nesarabad Upazila(1)	1.Daihari Union
Sunamganj District(2)	Sullah Upazila(2)	1.Bahara Union; 2.Habibpur Union
Dhaka District(1)	Nawabganj Upazila(1)	1.Jantrail Union
Habiganj District(1)	Ajmiriganj Upazila(1)	1.Badalpur union
Magura District(1)	Magura Sadar Upazila(1)	1.Atharokhada Union
Narail District(1)	Narail Sadar Upazila(1)	1.Mulia Union
Netrokona District(1)	Khaliajuri Upazila(1)	1.Nagar Union
Rajbari District(1)	Baliakandi Upazila(1)	1.Jangal Union

=== Hinduism in Bangladesh by decades ===
Hinduism in Bangladesh by decades
Year	Percent	Increase
1901	33%	-
1911	31.5%	▼ -1.5%
1921	30.6%	▼ -0.9%
1931	29.4%	▼ -1.2%
1941	28%	▼ -1.4%
1951	22%	▼ -6%
1961	18.5%	▼ -3.5
1974	13.5%	▼ -5
1981	12.1%	▼ -1.4
1991	10.5%	▼ -1.6
2001	9.6%	▼ -0.9%
2011	8.54%	▼ -1.06%
2022	7.95%	▼ -0.59%

View chart definition.

The Hindu population in what is now Bangladesh has consistently decreased as a percentage of the population, from 28% in 1941 to 13.5% at the time of Bangladesh's founding in 1974, and further to 7.9% in 2022. The Bangladesh Census authority has found that during the last 50 years, about 7.5 million (75 lakhs) Hindus have left the country due to religious persecution and discrimination. According to 2016 official figures, it is estimated that the Hindu population has come down to a mere 7%.

=== Future population ===
Historical Hindu Population
Year	Pop.	±%
1901	9,546,240	—
1911	9,939,825	+4.1%
1921	10,176,030	+2.4%
1931	10,466,988	+2.9%
1941	11,759,160	+12.3%
1951	9,239,603	−21.4%
1961	9,379,669	+1.5%
1974	9,673,048	+3.1%
1981	10,570,245	+9.3%
1991	11,178,866	+5.8%
2001	11,822,581	+5.8%
2011	12,730,651	+7.7%
2022	13,130,109	+3.1%
Source: God Willing: The Politics of Islamism in Bangladesh by Ali Riaz, p. 63

From 1964 to 2013, around 11.3 million Hindus left Bangladesh due to religious persecution and discrimination, as stated by Dhaka University economist Abul Barkat. On average, 632 Hindus left the country each day and 230,612 annually, as reported by him.

From his 30-year-long research, Barkat found that the exodus mostly took place during military governments after independence. Barkat also states that there should have been 28.7 million Hindus in the year 2013 instead of 12.2 million, or, to put it another way, Hindus should have accounted for 16-18% of Bangladesh's population, not 9.7% as they do currently. According to the United States Commission on International Religious Freedom, Hindus constitute merely 7% of the population in Bangladesh as per the latest 2016 figures.

According to the Pew Research Center, Bangladesh will have 14.47 million Hindus by 2050, who will comprise 7.3% of the country's population. Another theory suggests that Bangladesh will have at least 180-200 million people by 2050, out of which there will be around 8.51-9.25 million Hindus living in this nation, thus constituting only 4% after the beginning of the half-century. On average, 230,612 Hindus leave Bangladesh for India permanently each year. So between 2024 and 2050, it is estimated that 5,995,912 Hindus will leave the country if current immigration rates continue further.

Future Hindu population of Bangladesh
Year	Total Population	Hindu population	Percentage
2020	168,180,000	13,790,000	8.2%
2030	183,430,000	14,490,000	7.9%
2040	193,550,000	14,710,000	7.6%
2050	198,219,000	14,470,000	7.3%

=== Missing population ===
With migration into West Bengal, the 1947 partition of Bengal significantly altered religious demographics in the eastern segment of the province, which later became Bangladesh. Violence also saw an uptick in the 1950s and 1960s in what had then become East Pakistan (present-day Bangladesh), leading to large numbers of upper-caste Bengali Hindus migrating to West Bengal, Assam, and Tripura, with official Indian government records indicating 2,519,557 (Hindu) refugees crossed into India from East Bengal between 1941 and 1951.

Utilizing demographic studies and other methods over a 55-year period from 1947 to 2001, Sachi Dastidar of the State University of New York calculates that well over 49 million Hindus are missing today from Bangladesh. According to a report published by a local daily newspaper of Bangladesh, the Hindu population in the country has reduced by 1 million between 2001 and 2011. Ergo, in the absence of partition in 1947 and other events that followed, it is estimated the present-day Bangladeshi Hindu population would be approximately 63.13 million or 28%, well above the current population of 12.73 million or 8.5%, as reported in the Bangladesh 2011 census.

After the 1960s, most of the migration was lower caste – a trend that has continued to this day. As per a BJP estimate, Bangladeshi Hindu immigrants are a significant presence in 75 Assembly constituencies – making up approximately a fourth of the state's seats.

Starting from the 2014 Lok Sabha elections, the BJP has made the issue of Hindu Bangladeshi immigrants a core part of its strategy in West Bengal. An estimate shows that around 30 million Bangladeshi origin low-caste Hindu refugees live in different parts of West Bengal specially in southern districts namely North 24 Parganas, South 24 Parganas, Nadia and other smaller pockets of North and South Bengal, they are having an influence in over 70 assembly constituencies and are eagerly waiting to acquire Indian citizenship through CAA which was passed by Indian parliament in 2019 year for the purpose of granting them citizenship (if their religion is Hinduism, Sikhism, Jainism) as a promise criteria made by BJP in the election campaign of West Bengal earlier before the passage of that bill. An estimate shows that Assam has around 2 million Bangladeshi Hindus living in different parts of the state and are struggling to acquire Indian citizenship just like their counterparts in neighbouring West Bengal. The BJP hopes to wean away a large chunk of Bengali settlers who took refuge in Tripura from Bangladesh (former East Pakistan). The influx of Bengali Hindus increased during the Bangladesh Liberation War and around that time of (1971), India received 10 million refugees from East Pakistan - mostly 80% being Hindus - and after Bangladesh became independent, nearly 1.5 million of Bengali Hindu refugees decided to stay back in India, particularly in West Bengal and other north eastern states, mainly in Assam and Tripura. Census data show the population of Tripura's 19 Scheduled Tribes dropped from 63.77% in 1881 to 31.78% in 2011. This is attributed to the migration of 6.10 lakh Bengalis – a figure almost equal to the State's total population in 1951 – from East Pakistan (now Bangladesh) between 1947 and 1971. At present, there are around 2.2 million Bengali Hindus in Tripura (mostly of Eastern Bangladeshi origin), making them the largest ethnic group in the State, constituting around 60 percent of the state population.

=== Population controversies ===
The official number of Hindus living in Bangladesh is about 13.1 million or about 7.9% as per the 2022 census conducted by the Bangladesh government authority. However, at certain times, different leaders as well as the Bangladesh Bureau of Statistics have given different estimates. Bangladesh Institute of Development Studies (BIDS) has found that 4.67 million people, which is about 2.75% of the country's total population, have not been counted by the Bangladesh Bureau of Statistics (BBS) for the 2022 census. Moreover, around 2.75% of the undercount was reported in the case of Muslims, compared to 2.68% of followers of other religions. At the same time, indigenous activists of Bangladesh have claimed that ethnic minorities have been undercounted in Bangladesh's latest census.

Number of Hindus residing in Bangladesh (1998-2022 est.)
Source/claimed by	Population (%)	Year of claimed	Reference
Claimed by State Government of Bangladesh	20,160,000 16%	1998	
Claimed by Rabindranath Trivedi, President of Human Rights Congress for Bangladesh Minorities (HRCBM)	22,260,000 15%	2010	
Claimed Bangladesh Bureau of Statistics	15,500,000 10.3%	2014	
Claimed Bangladesh Bureau of Statistics	17,000,000 10.7%	2016	
Claimed by Ravindra Ghosh, Chairman of Bangladesh Hindu Janajagruti Samiti	18,000,000 11.04%	2019	
Claimed Bangladesh Government Official Website (Introduction)	18,150,000 12.1%	(Unknown)	
Claimed by KMSS leader Akhil Gogoi	19,000,000 11.65%	2019	
2019 report on International religious freedom: Bangladesh (US State Dept)	15,280,000 10%	2019	
Claimed by Bangladesh grand Hindu alliance leader Govindo Pramanik	25,000,000 15.7%	2019	
Claimed by The Statesman Newspaper	19,560,000 12%	2021	
Claimed by Bangladesh Information Minister Muhammad Hasan Mahmud	20,000,000 12.1%	2022	

== Culture ==
In nature, Bangladeshi Hinduism closely resembles the forms and customs of Hinduism practiced in the neighboring Indian state of West Bengal, which Bangladesh (once known as East Bengal) was united with until the partition of India in 1947. The vast majority of Hindus in Bangladesh are Bengali Hindus. Goddess (Devi) – usually venerated as Durga or Kali – is widely revered, often alongside her consort Shiva. The worship of Shiva has generally found adherents among the higher castes in Bangladesh. Worship of Vishnu (typically in the form of his Avatars or incarnation Rama or Krishna) more explicitly cuts across caste lines by teaching the fundamental oneness of humankind in spirit. Vishnu worship in Bengal expresses the union of the male and female principles in a tradition of love and devotion. This form of Hindu belief and the Sufi tradition of Islam have influenced and interacted with each other in Bengal. Both were popular mystical movements emphasizing the personal relationship of religious leaders and disciples instead of the dry stereotypes of the Brahmins or the Ulama. As in Bengali Hindu practice, worship of Vishnu frequently occurs in a small devotional society (shomaj). Both use the language of earthly love to express communion with the divine. In both traditions, the Bengali language is the vehicle of a large corpus of mystical literature of great beauty and emotional impact. In Bangladeshi Hinduism, ritual bathing, vows, and pilgrimages to sacred rivers, mountains, and shrines are common practices. An ordinary Hindu will worship at the shrines of Muslim pirs, without being concerned with the religion to which that place is supposed to be affiliated. Hindus revere many holy men and ascetics conspicuous for their bodily mortifications. Durga Puja, held in September–October, is the most important festival of Bangladeshi Hindus and it is widely celebrated amongst Bangladeshi Hindus. Thousands of pandals (mandaps) are set up in various cities, towns, and villages to mark the festival. Other festivals are Kali Puja, Janmashtami, Holi, Saraswati Puja, Shivratri and Rathayatra, the most popular being the century-old Dhamrai Rathayatra. The principle of ahimsa is expressed in almost universally observed rules against eating beef. By no means are all Bangladeshi Hindus vegetarians, but abstinence from all kinds of meat is regarded as a "higher" virtue. The Priestly Caste Brahmin (pronounced Brahmon in Bengali) Bangladeshi Hindus, unlike their counterparts elsewhere in South Asia, eat fish and chicken. This is similar to the Indian state of West Bengal, where Hindus also consume fish, eggs, chicken, and mutton. There are also some vegetarians as well. There are also non-Bengali Hindus in Bangladesh; the majority of the Hajong, Rajbongshi people and Tripuris in Bangladesh are Hindus.

=== Hindu temples ===
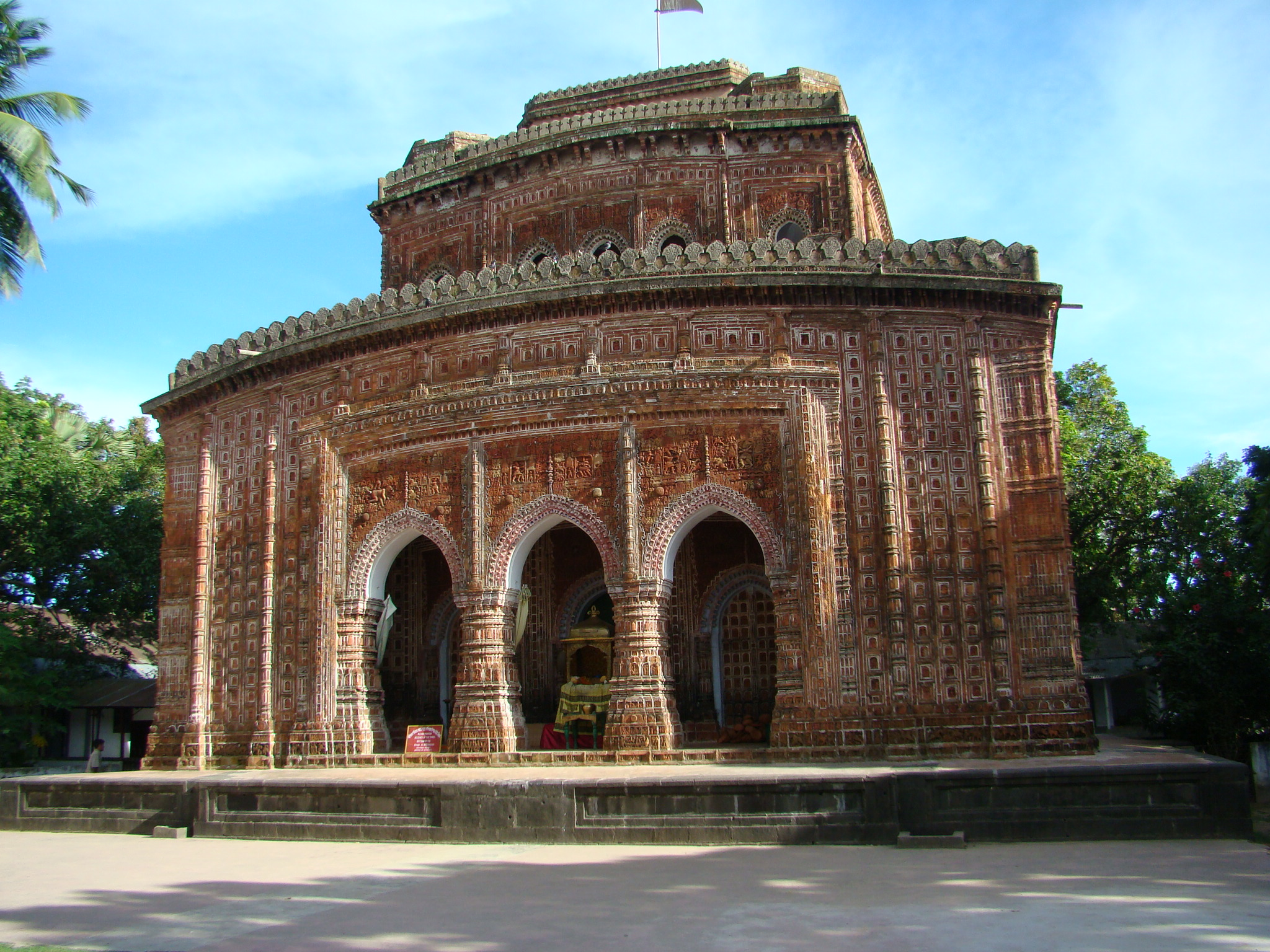
Kantajew Temple

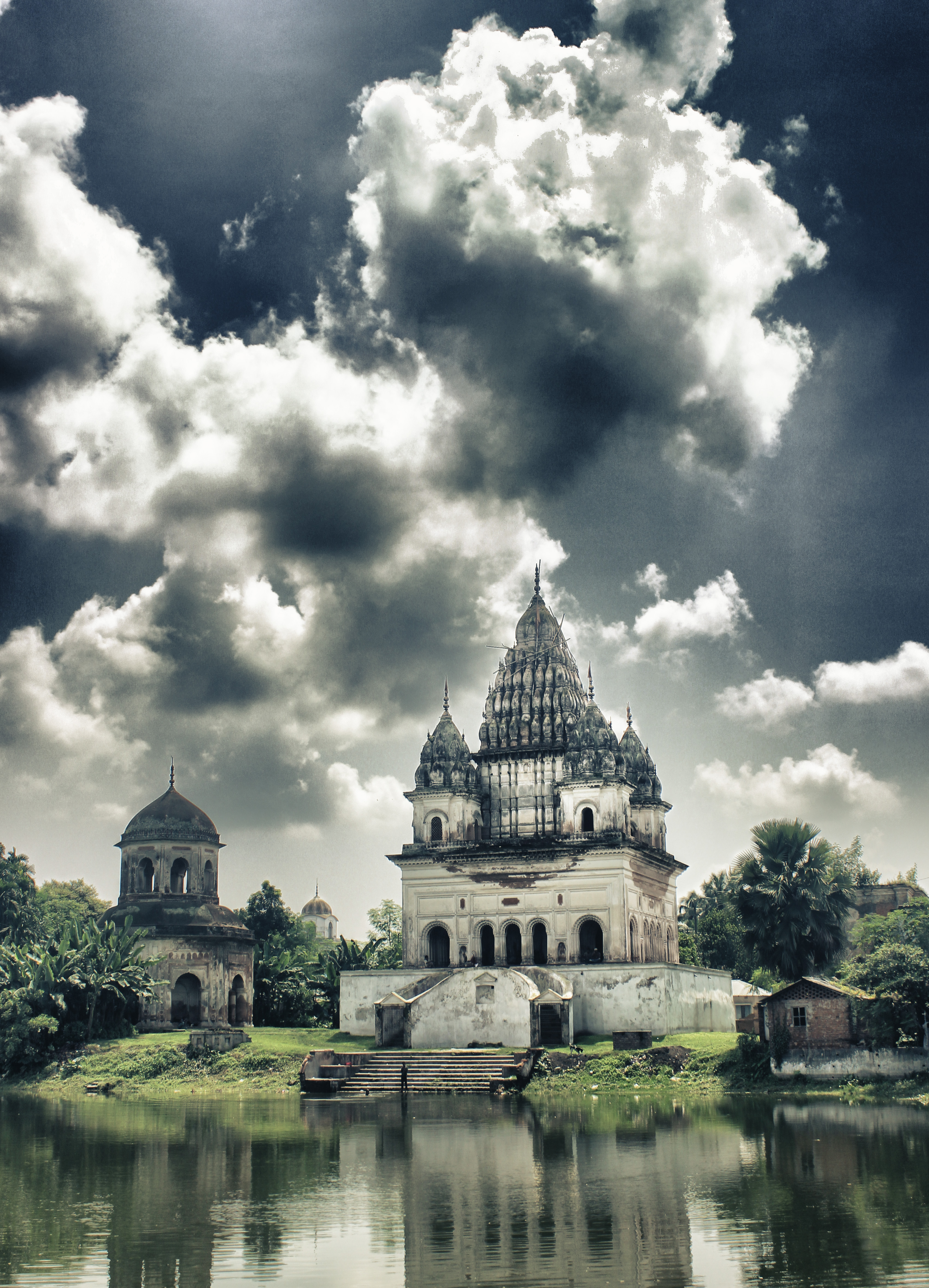
Shiva Temple, Puthia, Rajshahi.

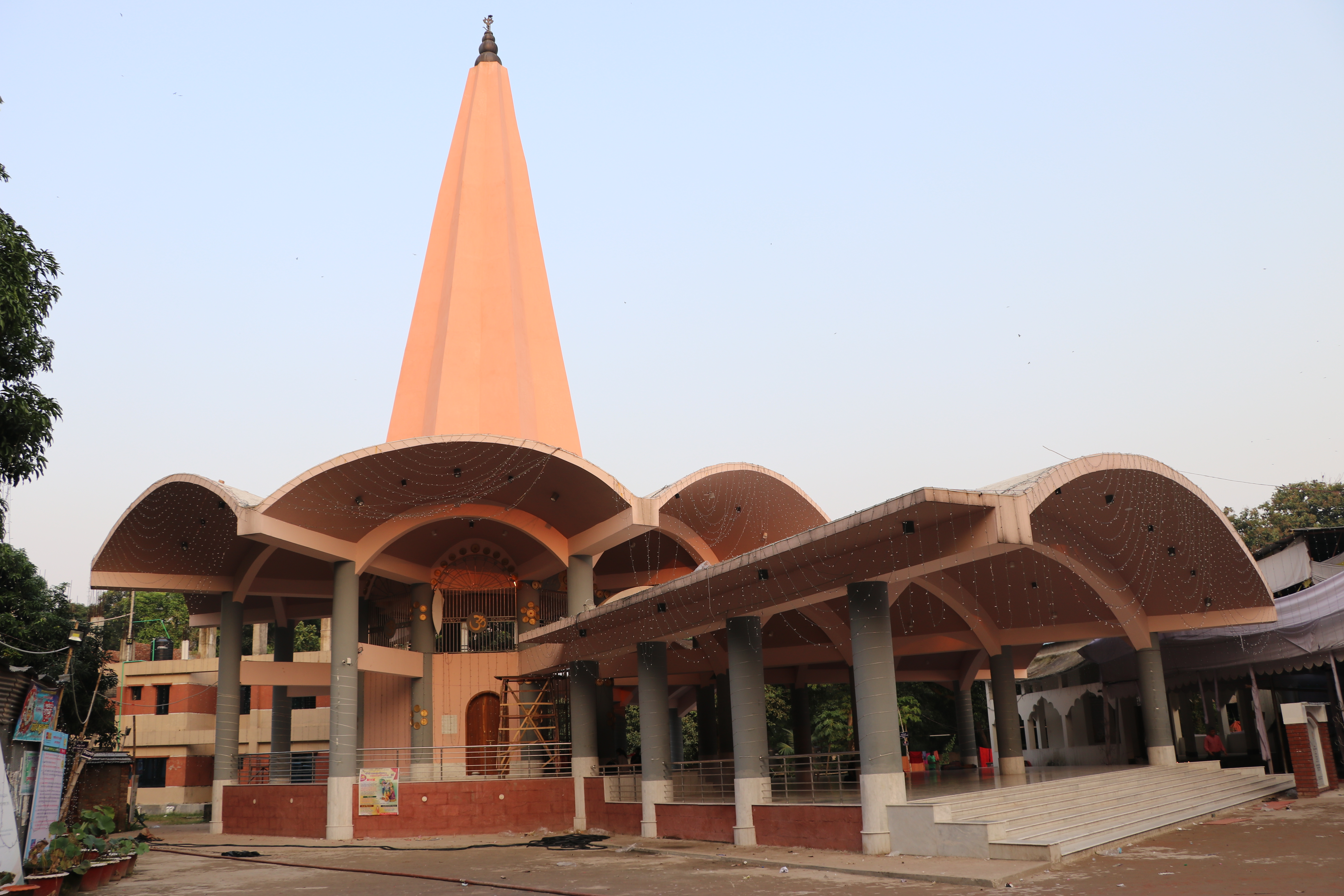
Ramna Kali Temple, Dhaka

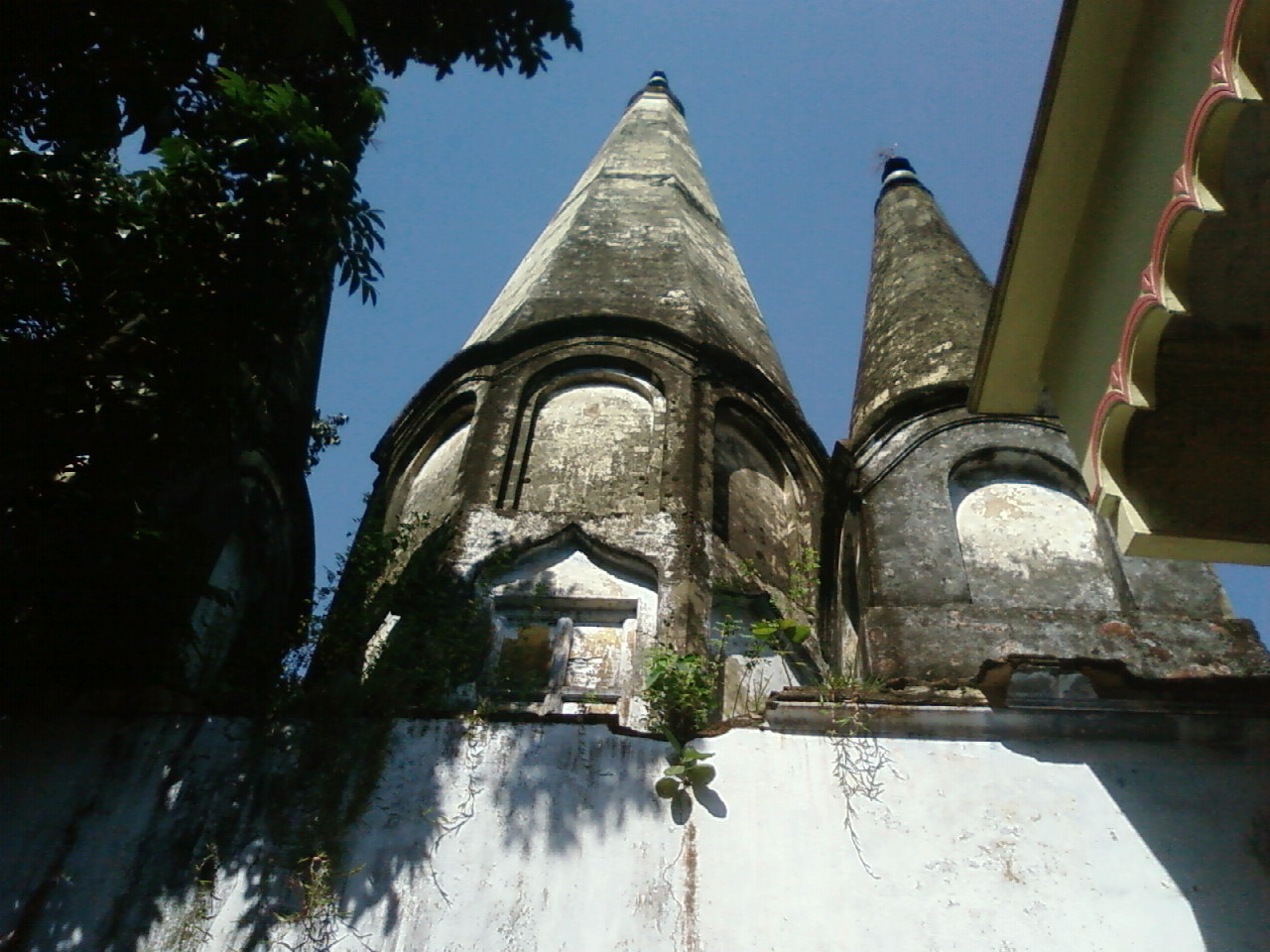
Kal Bhairab Temple at Brahmanbaria.

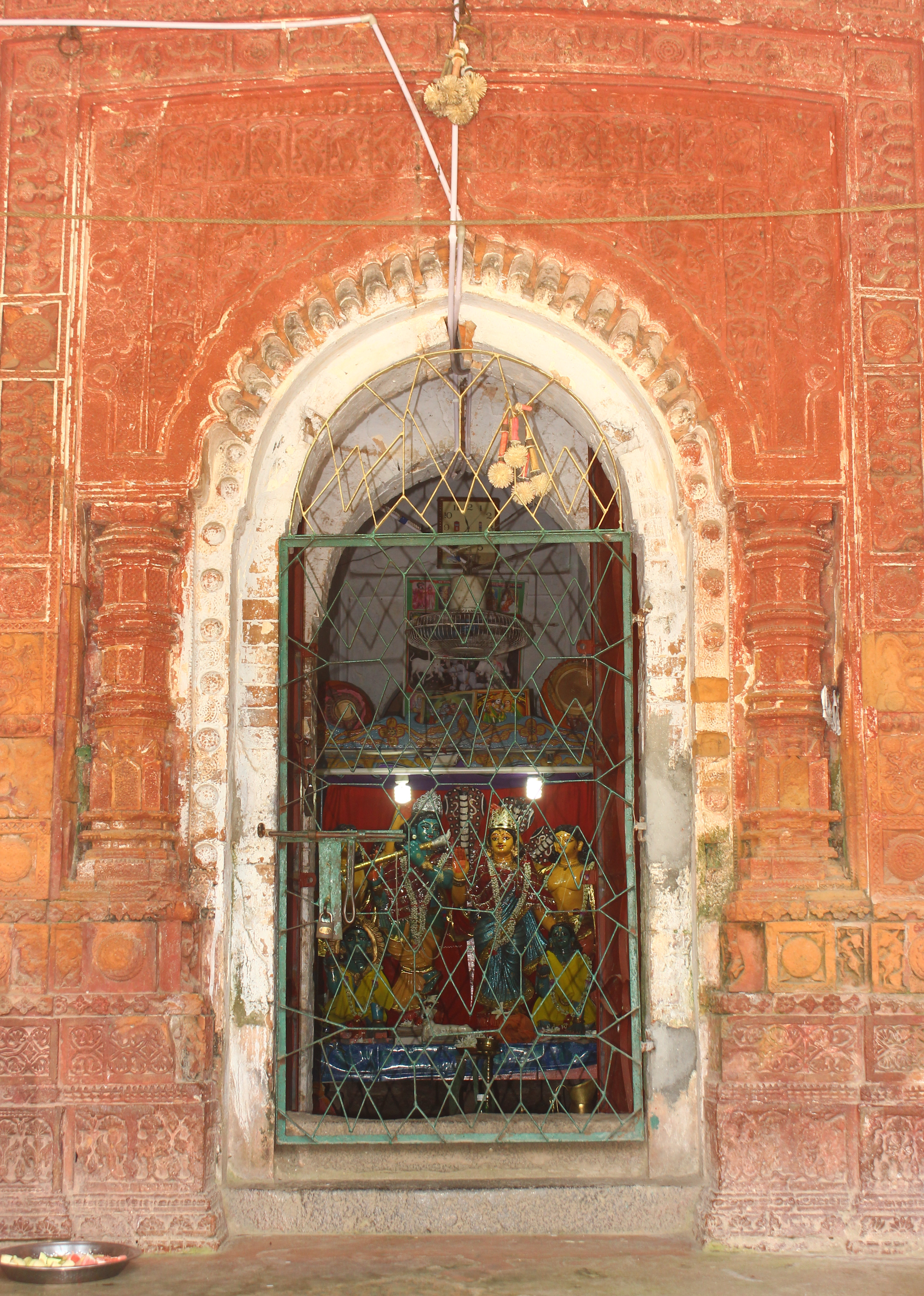
Gobinda Temple, Puthia, Rajshahi, Bangladesh.

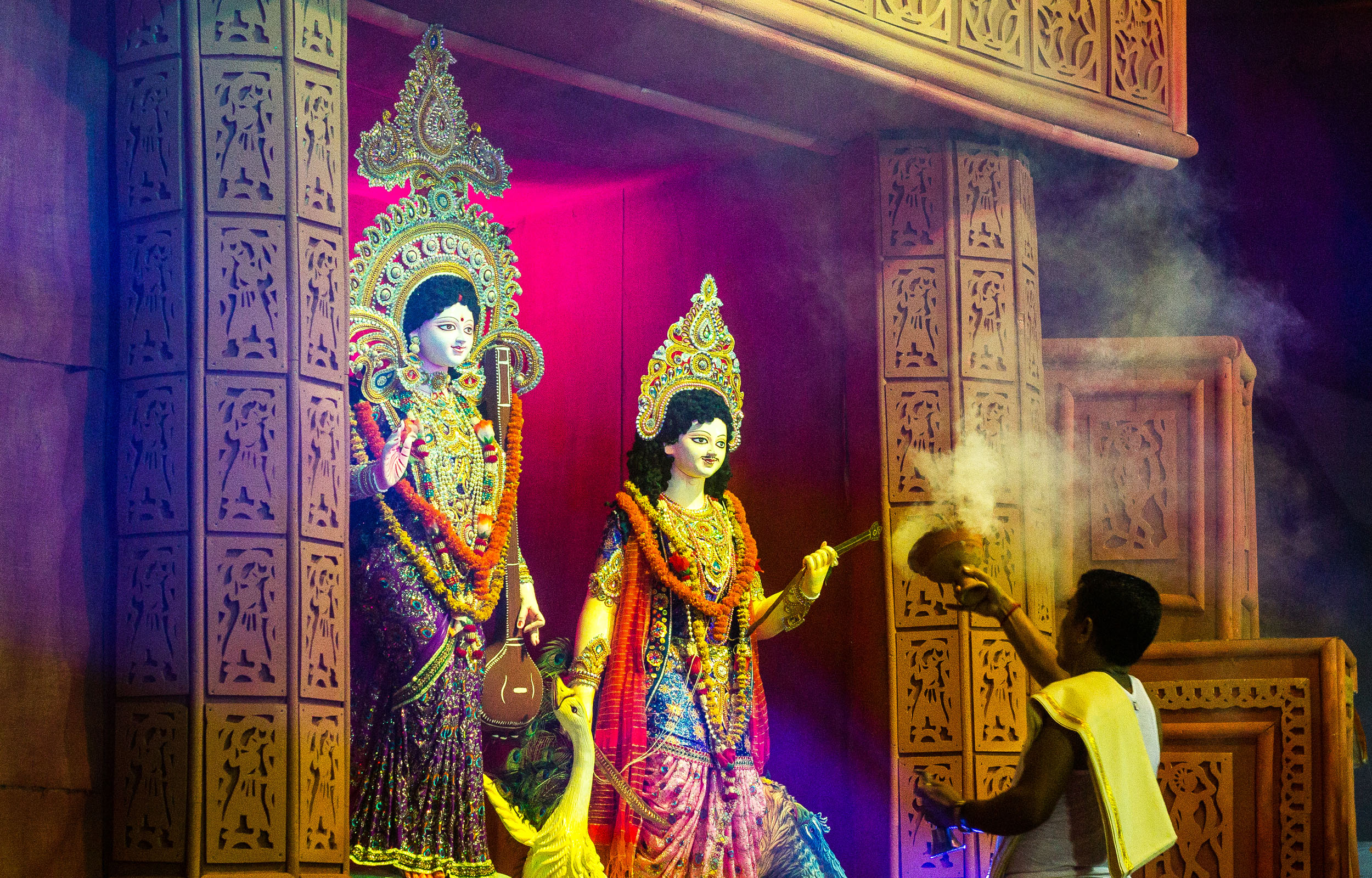
Durga Puja in Dhaka.

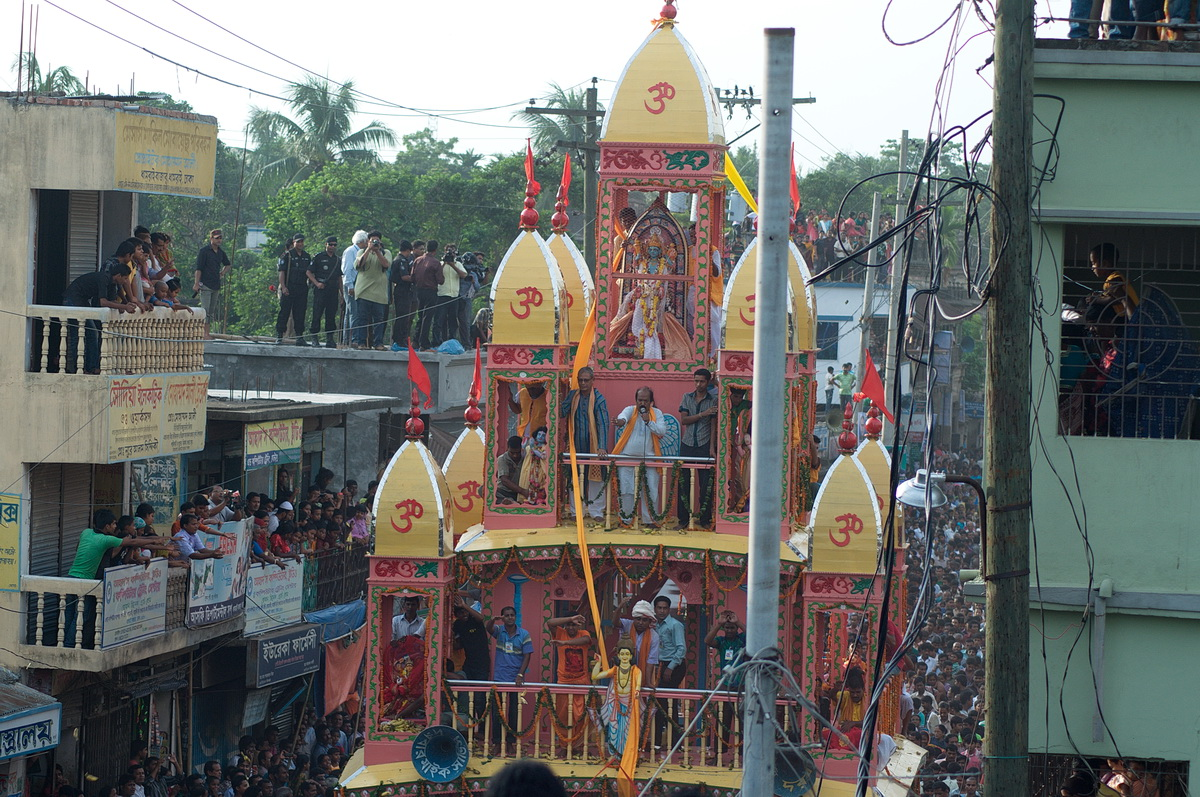
Roth Yatra procession.

Hindu temples and shrines are distributed across the country. The Kantaji Temple is an elegant example of an 18th-century temple. The most prominent temple is the Dhakeshwari National Temple, located in Dhaka. This temple, along with other Hindu organizations, arranges Durga Puja and Krishna Janmaashtami very prominently. The other main temples of Dhaka are the Ramakrishna Mission, Ramna Kali Temple, Joy Kali Temple, Laxmi Narayan Mandir, Swami Bagh Temple and Siddheswari Kalimandir.

Many Hindu temples have suffered from the implementation of the Vested Property Act through which land and movable property have been confiscated by agents acting on behalf of successive governments.

=== Hindu marriage law ===
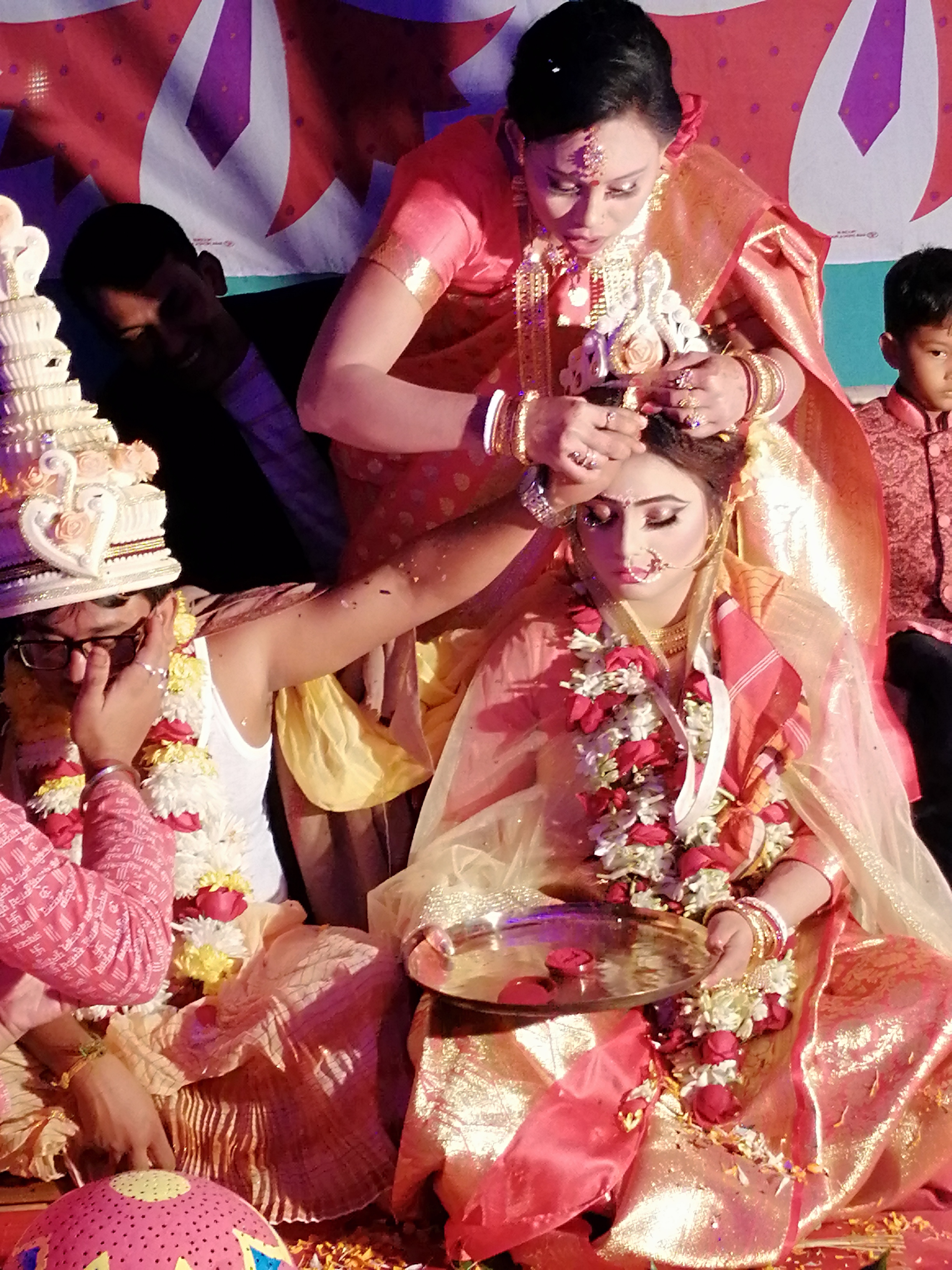
A typical Bangladeshi Hindu wedding.

Hindu family law governs the personal life of Hindus in Bangladesh. There is no known limit on the number of wives a Hindu man can take in Bangladesh, so polygamy for Hindu men is legal in Bangladesh.

"Under Bangladesh Hindu (civil) law, men may have multiple wives, but there are officially no options for divorce", the United States Department of State 2023 Report on International Religious Freedom: Bangladesh reported. Women are also prohibited from inheriting property under the civil laws for Hindus, the report said. A survey conducted during the year by Research Initiatives in Bangladesh and MJF showed that 26.7% of Hindu men and 29.2% of Hindu women would like to obtain a divorce but did not do so because of existing laws.

== Persecution ==
Hindus and others have been regularly and systematically persecuted; the persecution has occurred during events which include the Bangladesh genocide, the Bangladesh Liberation War and numerous recurring massacres of civilians resulting in a continuous decline in the number of Hindus in Bangladesh due to this ethnic cleansing. According to Professor Ali Riaz, anti-Hindu sentiment in Bangladesh is linked with anti-India sentiment, which has led to accusations of dual loyalty among Bangladeshi Hindus by Islamists and right-wing nationalists.

Decline of percentage of Hindus in Bangladesh by decade
Census Year	Percentage of Hindus (%)	Decline (%)	Cumulative Decline (%)	Comment
1901	33.0	NA	NA	
1911	31.5	1.5	1.5	
1921	30.6	0.9	2.4	
1931	29.4	1.2	3.6	
1941	28.0	1.4	5.0	
1951	22.0	6.0	11.0	Due to communal riots and subsequent departure of Hindus during and after the partition of India in 1947
1961	18.5	3.5	14.5	
1974	13.5	5.0	19.5	Due to massacres and subsequent departure of Hindus during and after the Bangladesh genocide in 1971
1981	12.1	1.4	20.9	
1991	10.5	1.6	22.5	
2001	9.6	0.9	23.4	
2011	8.5	1.1	24.5	
2022	7.95	0.55	25.05	

=== Bangladesh Liberation War atrocities (1971) ===
The Bangladesh Liberation War resulted in one of the largest genocides of the 20th century. While estimates of the number of casualties were 200,000–3,000,000, it is reasonably certain that Hindus bore a disproportionate brunt of the Pakistan Army's onslaught against the Bengali population of what was East Pakistan. The Pakistani Army killed many Bengali Hindus during the Liberation War, and most of the Bengali Hindu-owned businesses were permanently destroyed. The historic Ramna Kali Temple in Dhaka and the century-old Rath at Dhamrai were demolished and burned down by the Pakistani Army. (Note: An article in Time magazine dated 2 August 1971, stated "The Hindus, who account for three-fourths of the refugees and a majority of the dead, have borne the brunt of the Moslem military's hatred." An estimated 10 million East Pakistanis sought refuge in India, with 80% being Hindus. Approximately 8 million Hindus fled to various parts of India during the 1971 Bangladesh Liberation War to escape persecution by Pakistani armies and Islamic militias. Active perpetrators of genocide, ethnic cleansing and rapes of Hindus in Bangladesh include the Pakistani Military, Al Badr, Al Sham, East Pakistan Central Peace Committee, Razakars, Muslim League, Jamaat-e-Islami, and the Urdu-speaking Biharis. After Independence, it was discovered that 1.5 million Hindus remained in India, while the remaining 6.5 million returned to Bangladesh. Additionally, an estimated 3.1 million Hindus who were already residing in Bangladesh chose to remain during the turmoil and survived the atrocities. It is estimated that between 300,000 and 3 million people were killed during the Bangladesh Liberation War, with 300,000 to 400,000 Bengali women being raped, with many of the victims being Hindus. Senator Edward Kennedy wrote in a report that was part of United States Senate Committee on Foreign Relations testimony dated 1 November 1971, "Hardest hit have been members of the Hindu community who have been robbed of their lands and shops, systematically slaughtered, and in some places, painted with yellow patches marked "H". All of this has been officially sanctioned, ordered and implemented under martial law from Islamabad". In the same report, Senator Kennedy reported that 60% of the refugees in India were Hindus and according to numerous international relief agencies such as UNESCO and World Health Organization, the number of East Pakistani refugees at its peak in India was close to 10 million. The Pulitzer Prize–winning journalist Sydney Schanberg covered the start of the war and wrote extensively on the suffering of the East Bengalis, including the Hindus both during and after the conflict. In a syndicated column "The Pakistani Slaughter That Nixon Ignored", he wrote about his return to liberated Bangladesh in 1972. "Other reminders were the yellow "H"s the Pakistanis had painted on the homes of Hindus, particular targets of the Pakistani army, (Newsday, 29 April 1994).)

=== Post-liberation period (1971 onwards) ===
Persecution of Hindus continued in independent Bangladesh. According to the report of the United States Commission on International Religious Freedom (USCIRF) in 2018, Hindus are among those who are persecuted in Bangladesh, with hundreds of cases of "killings, attempted killings, death threats, assaults, rapes, kidnappings, and attacks on homes, businesses, and places of worship" against religious minorities in 2017. Hindu temples in Bangladesh have also been vandalised.

According to Dr. Abul Barkat, no Hindus will be left in Bangladesh 30 years from now if the current rate of "exodus" continues as on average 632 people from the minority community leave the Muslim-majority country each day. From 1964 to 2013, around 11.3 million Hindus left Bangladesh due to religious persecution and discrimination which means on average 632 Hindus left the country each day and 230,612 annually, he said at the book launch ceremony at Dhaka University (DU).

==== Sheikh Mujib era (1972–1975) ====
In the first constitution of the newly independent country, secularism and equality of all citizens irrespective of religious identity were enshrined. On his return to liberated Bangladesh, Sheikh Mujibur Rahman in his first speech to the nation, specifically recognized the disproportionate suffering of the Hindu population during the Bangladesh Liberation War. On a visit to Kolkata, India, in February 1972, Mujib visited the refugee camps that were still hosting several million Bangladeshi Hindus and appealed to them to return to Bangladesh and to help to rebuild the country.

Despite the public commitment of Sheikh Mujibur Rahman and his government to re-establish secularism and the rights of non-Muslim religious groups, two significant aspects of his rule remain controversial as related to the conditions of Hindus in Bangladesh. The first was his refusal to return the premises of the Ramna Kali Mandir, historically the most important temple in Dhaka, to the religious body that owned the property. This centuries-old Hindu temple was demolished by the Pakistan Army during the Bangladesh Liberation War, and around one hundred devotees were murdered. Under the provisions of the Enemy Property Act, it was determined that ownership of the property could not be established as there were no surviving members to claim inherited rights, and the land was handed over to the Dhaka Club.

Secondly, state-authorized confiscation of Hindu-owned property under the provisions of the Enemy Property Act was rampant during Mujib's rule, and as per the research conducted by Abul Barkat of Dhaka University, the Awami League party of Sheikh Mujib was the largest beneficiary of Hindu property transfer in the past 35 years of Bangladeshi independence. This was enabled considerably because of the particular turmoil and displacement suffered by Bangladeshi Hindus, who bore the disproportionate brunt of the Pakistan Army's genocide, as well documented by international publications such as Time magazine and the New York Times, and by the declassified Hamoodur Rahman Commission report. This caused much bitterness among Bangladeshi Hindus, particularly given the public stance of the regime's commitment to secularism and communal harmony.

==== Zia and Ershad regimes (1975–1990) ====
President Ziaur Rahman abandoned the constitutional provision for secularism and began to introduce Islamic symbolism across all spheres of national life (such as official seals and the constitutional preamble). Zia brought back the multi-party system, thus allowing organizations such as Jamaat-e-Islami Bangladesh (an offshoot of the Islamist Jamaat-e-Islami in Pakistan) to regroup and contest elections. In 1988, President Hussein Mohammed Ershad declared Islam to be the State Religion of Bangladesh. Although the move was protested by students and left-leaning political parties and minority groups, to this date neither the regimes of the BNP nor Awami League have challenged this change, and it remains in place.

In 1990, the Ershad regime was widely blamed for negligence (and some human rights analyses allege active participation) in the anti-Hindu riots following the Babri Mosque incident in India, the largest communal disturbances since Bangladesh's independence, as a means of diverting attention from the rapidly increasing opposition to his rule. Many Hindu temples, Hindu neighbourhoods and shops were attacked and damaged including, for the first time since 1971, the Dhakeshwari temple. The atrocities were brought to the West's attention by many Bangladeshis, including Taslima Nasrin and her book Lajja, which, translated into English, means "shame".

==== Return to democracy (1991–2008) ====
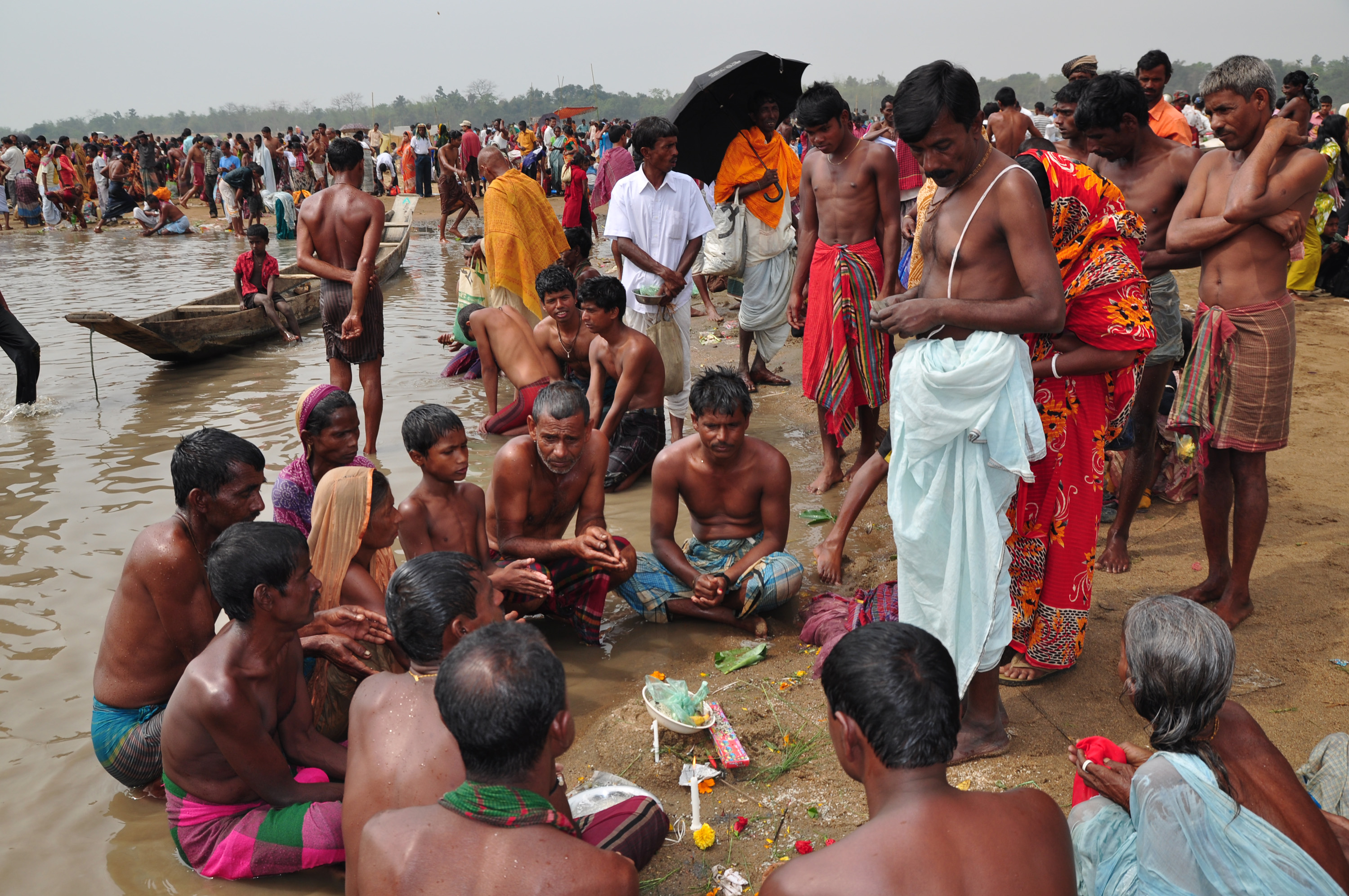
Hindu festival in Bangladesh.

Immediately after the Bangladesh Nationalist Party and its Islamic fundamentalist allies came to power in the October 2001 elections, ruling coalition activists attacked Hindus on a large scale in retribution for their perceived support of the opposition Awami League. Hundreds were killed, many were raped, and thousands fled to India. The events were widely seen as a repercussion against the razing of the Babri Mosque in India.

Prominent political leaders frequently fall back on "Hindu bashing" in an attempt to appeal to extremist sentiment and to stir up communal passions. In one of the most notorious utterances of a mainstream Bangladeshi figure, the immediate past Prime Minister Khaleda Zia, while the leader of the opposition in 1996, declared that the country was at risk of hearing "uludhhwani" (a Hindu custom involving women's ululation) from mosques, replacing the azan (Muslim call to prayer) (e.g., see Agence-France Press report of 18 November 1996, "Bangladesh opposition leader accused of hurting religious sentiment").

After the election of 2001, when a right-wing coalition including two Islamist parties (Jamaat-e-Islami Bangladesh and Islami Oikya Jote) led by the pro-Islamic right-wing Bangladesh Nationalist Party (BNP) came to power, many minority Hindus and liberal secularist Muslims were attacked by a section of the governing regime. Thousands of Bangladeshi Hindus were believed to have fled to neighbouring India to escape the violence unleashed by activists sympathetic to the new government. Many Bangladeshi Muslims played an active role in documenting atrocities against Hindus during this period.

The new government also clamped down on attempts by the media to document alleged atrocities against non-Muslim minorities following the election. Severe pressure was put on newspapers and other media outside of government control through threats of violence and other intimidation. Most prominently, the Muslim journalist and human rights activist Shahriyar Kabir was arrested on charges of treason on his return from India, where he had been interviewing Hindu refugees from Bangladesh; this was by the Bangladesh High Court, and he was subsequently freed.

The fundamentalists and right-wing parties such as the BNP and Jatiya Party often portray Hindus as being sympathetic to India, and transferring economic resources to India, contributing to a widespread perception that Bangladeshi Hindus are disloyal to the state. Also, the right-wing parties claim that Hindus are backing the Awami League. As widely documented in international media, Bangladesh authorities have had to increase security to enable Bangladeshi Hindus to worship freely following widespread attacks on places of worship and devotees.

In October 2006, the United States Commission on International Religious Freedom published a report titled 'Policy Focus on Bangladesh,' which said that since its last election, 'Bangladesh has experienced growing violence by religious extremists, intensifying concerns expressed by the country's religious minorities'. The report further stated that Hindus are particularly vulnerable in a period of rising violence and extremism, whether motivated by religious, political or criminal factors, or some combination. The report noted that Hindus had multiple disadvantages against them in Bangladesh, such as perceptions of dual loyalty concerning India and religious beliefs that are not tolerated by the politically dominant Islamic Fundamentalists of the BNP. Violence against Hindus has taken place "in order to encourage them to flee in order to seize their property". The previous reports of the Hindu American Foundation were acknowledged and confirmed by this non-partisan report.

On 2 November 2006, USCIRF criticized Bangladesh for violence against minority Hindus. It also urged the Bush administration to get Dhaka to ensure the protection of religious freedom and minority rights before Bangladesh's next national elections in January 2007.

==== Sheikh Hasina era (2008–2024) ====
In 2013, the International Crimes Tribunal indicted several Jamaat members for war crimes against Hindus during the 1971 Bangladesh atrocities. In retaliation, violence against Hindu minorities in Bangladesh was instigated by the Bangladesh Jamaat-e-Islami.

BJHM (Bangladesh Jatiya Hindu Mahajote) claimed in its report that in 2017, at least 107 Hindus were killed and 31 fell victim to enforced disappearance. 782 Hindus were forced to leave the country or threatened into doing so, 23 were forced to convert to other religions, and at least 25 Hindu women and children were raped, while 235 temples and statues were vandalized. 6,474 atrocities were committed against the Hindu community in total.

During the 2019 Bangladesh elections, eight houses belonging to Hindu families caught fire in Thakurgaon alone. In April 2019, two idols of Hindu goddesses, Lakshmi and Saraswati, were vandalized by unidentified miscreants at a newly constructed temple in Kazipara of Brahmanbaria. In the same month, several idols of Hindu gods in two temples in Madaripur Sadar Upazila, which were under construction, were desecrated by miscreants.

In 2021, many temples and houses of Hindus were broken and vandalized after an attack on them on Narendra Modi visit to Bangladesh by Hefazat-e-Islam and other radical groups as anti-Modi protests. Similarly, there were attacks on Hindus in 2020, after some of them supported France after the Murder of Samuel Paty. In October of the same year, there was severe communal violence in Bangladesh against the Bengali Hindus after the video of Quran desecration at the Durga Puja pandals was spread, in which more than 120 Hindu temples were vandalized and 7 Hindus were killed. It was described by The New York Times as "worst communal violence in years".

==== Post-revolution Bangladesh (2024–present) ====
Following the July Revolution that overthrew the Hasina regime in August 2024, Hindu temples, businesses and homes were attacked by mobs upset that many Hindus in the country were seen as supporting the deposed Hasina's Awami League party, something that was alleged to have upset more conservative Islamist political groups. As of 8 August 2024, a school teacher was reported dead and 45 injured, with 45 out of the country's 64 districts having at least one attack on Hindu individuals or property. Protesters protected Hindu temples and communities from extremists. In 2025, Dipu Chandra Das, a 27-year-old Hindu garment worker, was captured by several of his Muslim colleagues for allegedly making derogatory remarks about the Prophet Muhammad. The accusations drew a violent mob that beat him to death, hung his body from a tree and set it on fire.

On 10 November 2026, a Durga temple located inside the Laxminarayan Cotton Mill in Siddhirganj, Narayanganj, was vandalised and its gate lock replaced to obstruct access amid an ongoing land dispute. Following complaints from the temple committee accusing officials of the Knit Concern Group of damaging decorations and blocking entry, local police detained two company officials for questioning on 11 November.

== Political representation ==
Because Hindus in Bangladesh are scattered across all areas (except in Narayanganj), they cannot unite politically. However, Hindus became swing voters in various elections. Historically, Hindus have usually voted en masse for Bangladesh Awami League and communist parties, as these are the only parties that have a nominal commitment to secularism. This pattern, however, shifted in 2026. Due to the ban on Awami League, a significant number of Hindus preferred voting for the Bangladesh Nationalist Party (traditional rival of the Awami League), as the latter option, Bangladesh Jamaat-e-Islami, is known for anti-Hindu persecution, including during the 1971 Liberation War.

Even after the decline of the Hindu population in Bangladesh from 13.5% in 1974, just after independence, Hindus were at around 11.2% of the population in 2001 according to government estimates following the census. However, Hindus accounted for only thirty-two members of the 300 member parliament following the 2001 elections through direct election; this went up to thirty-five following a by-election victory in 2004. Of the 50 seats reserved for women that are directly nominated by the Prime Minister, only four were allotted to a Hindu. The political representation is not at all satisfactory, and several Hindu advocacy groups in Bangladesh have demanded a return to a communal electorate system as existed during the Pakistan period, to enable a more equitable and proportionate representation in parliament, or a reserved quota since the persecution of Hindus has continued since 1946.

Despite their dwindling population in terms of overall percentage, Hindus still yield considerable influence because of their geographical concentration in certain regions. They form a majority of the electorate in at least two parliamentary constituencies (Khulna-1 and Gopalganj-3) and account for more than 25% in at least another thirty. For this reason, they are often the deciding factor in parliamentary elections where victory margins can be extremely narrow. It is also frequently alleged that this is a prime reason for many Hindus being prevented from voting in elections, either through intimidating actual voters or through exclusion in voter list revisions.

== See also ==
- Durga Puja in Bangladesh
- List of Bangladeshi Hindus
- Religion in Bangladesh
  - Islam in Bangladesh
  - Buddhism in Bangladesh
  - Christianity in Bangladesh
- Freedom of religion in Bangladesh
- Hinduism by country
- Bengali Hindus
- Persecution of Hindus
