= Shibsa River =

River of Bangladesh

Coordinates: 22.225955°N 89.467182°E

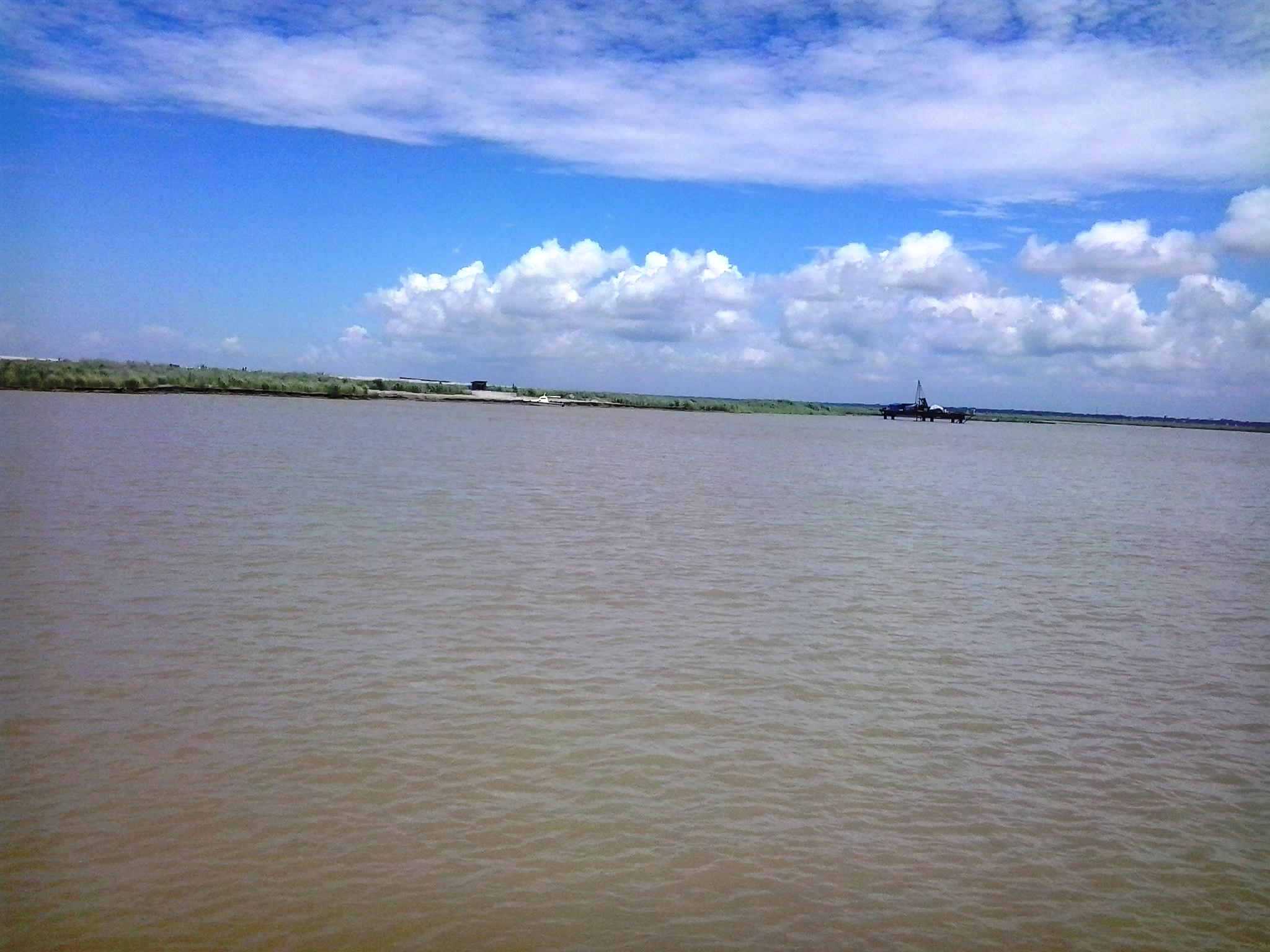
Shibsha River near Khulna

The Shibsa River is located in western Bangladesh, and is about 100 km long. The river forms much of the boundary between Paikgachha and Dacope upazilas of the Khulna District. Inside the Sundarbans Reserve Forest, the Shibsa meets the Pasur River, then separates again near Mongla, before reaching the Bay of Bengal.
