= Bhodra River =

Coordinates: 22.6580°N 89.4009°E

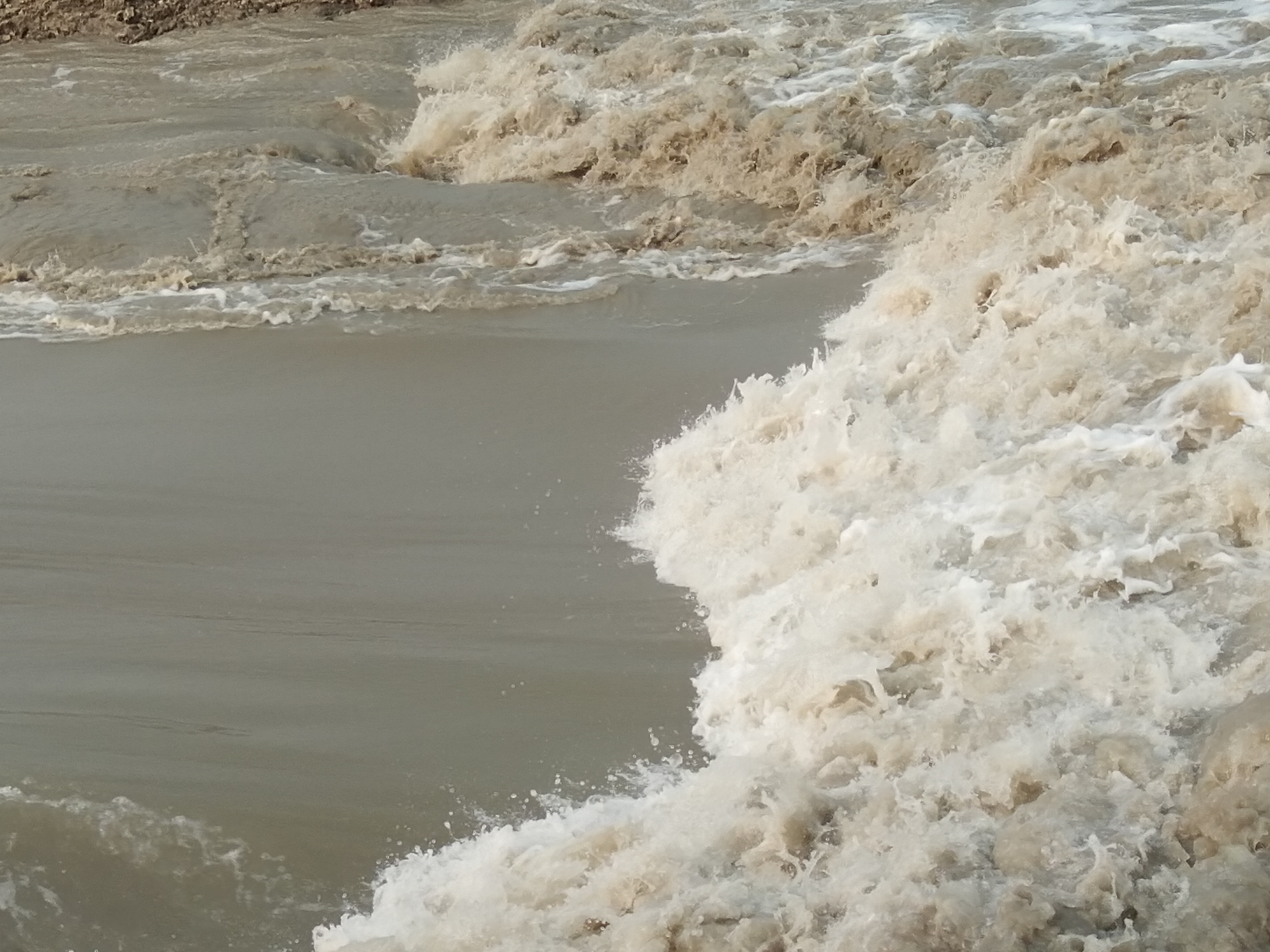
- Bhodra River in 2019

Location
- Country: Bangladesh
- Division: Khulna Division
- District: Khulna District

Physical characteristics
- Source: Haporkhali River
- Mouth: Sutarkhali River
- Length: 193 km (120 mi)

Bhodra river (Bengali: ভদ্রা নদী) flows across the Khulna Division of Bangladesh.

== Location ==
Bhodra river is 193 kilometres (120 mi) long. The river originates from Kopotaksha River in Jessore and fall on the connecting point of Shibsha and Poshur rivers.
