= Pasur River =

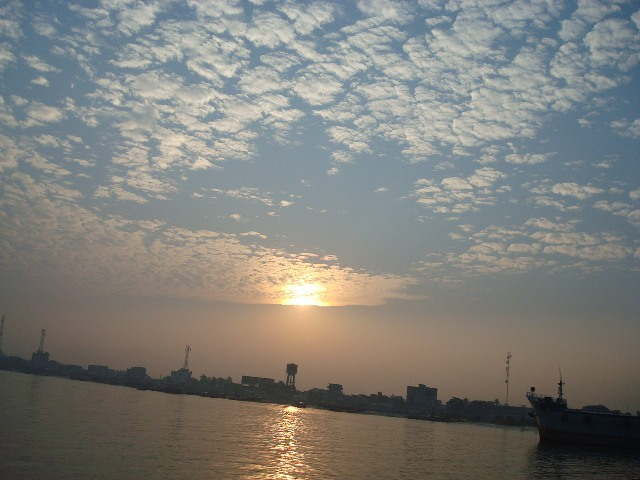

- Location in Bangladesh

Location
- Country: Bangladesh
- Division: Khulna Division
- District: Khulna, Bagerhat

Physical characteristics
- Source: Rupsha River
- Mouth: Bay of Bengal
  - coordinates: 21°45′N 89°30′E
- Length: 142 km (88 mi)

The Pasur is a river in southwestern Bangladesh and a distributary of the Ganges. It continues the Rupsa River. All the distributaries of the Pasur are tidal. It meets the Shibsa River in the Sundarbans. Near the sea, it becomes the Kunga River. The Pasur is one of the deepest and navigable rivers in Bangladesh.

It is home to Sundarbans Firefly Sanctuary, a wildlife sanctuary for regional wildlife, including the Bengal tiger.

== Course ==
The Pasur leaves the Madhumati River (there called the Baleswar) northeast of Khulna city and flows some 110 miles southward past the port at Mongla and through the swampy Sundarbans region to the Bay of Bengal.
