= Khulna District =

Khulna district খুলনা জেলা
- District of Bangladesh
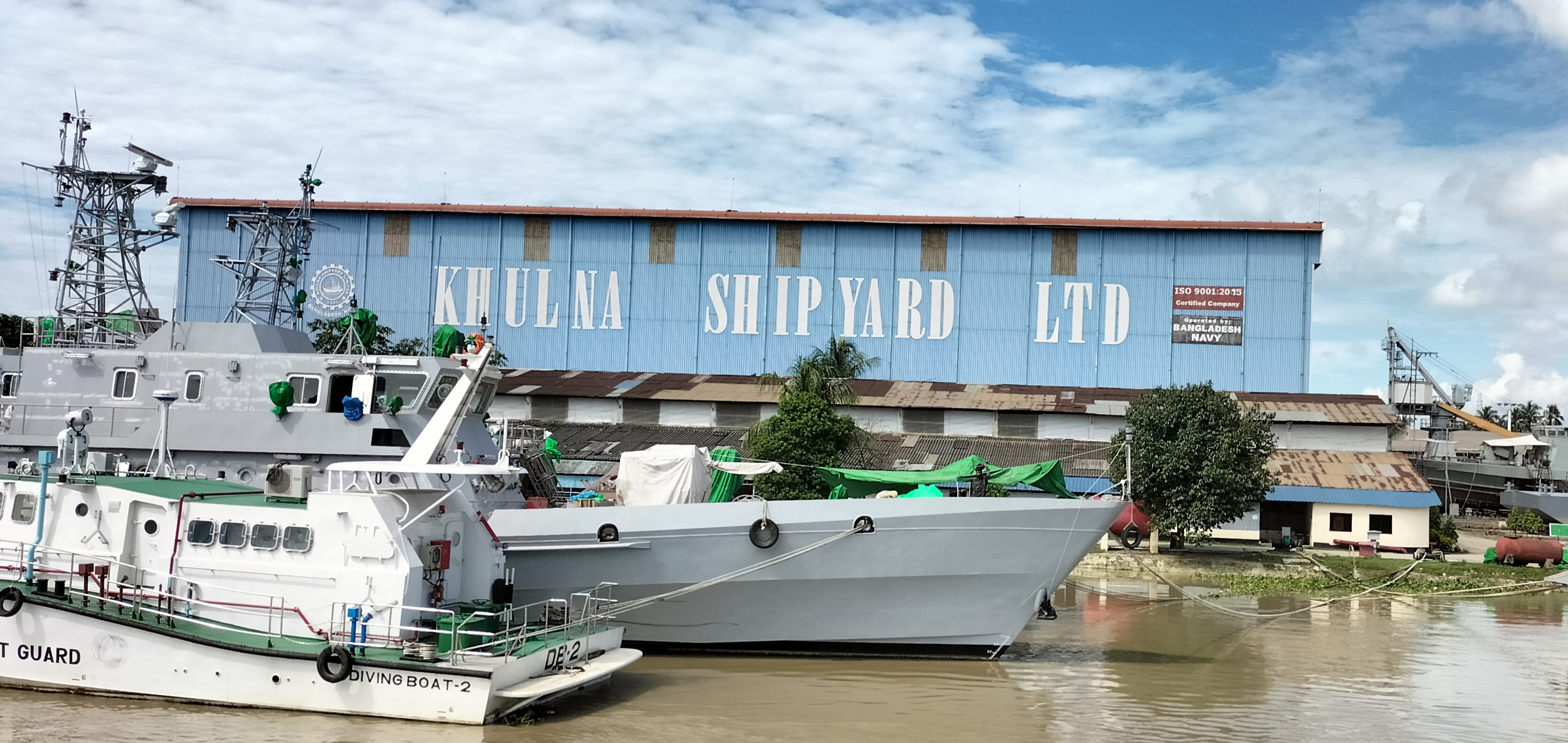
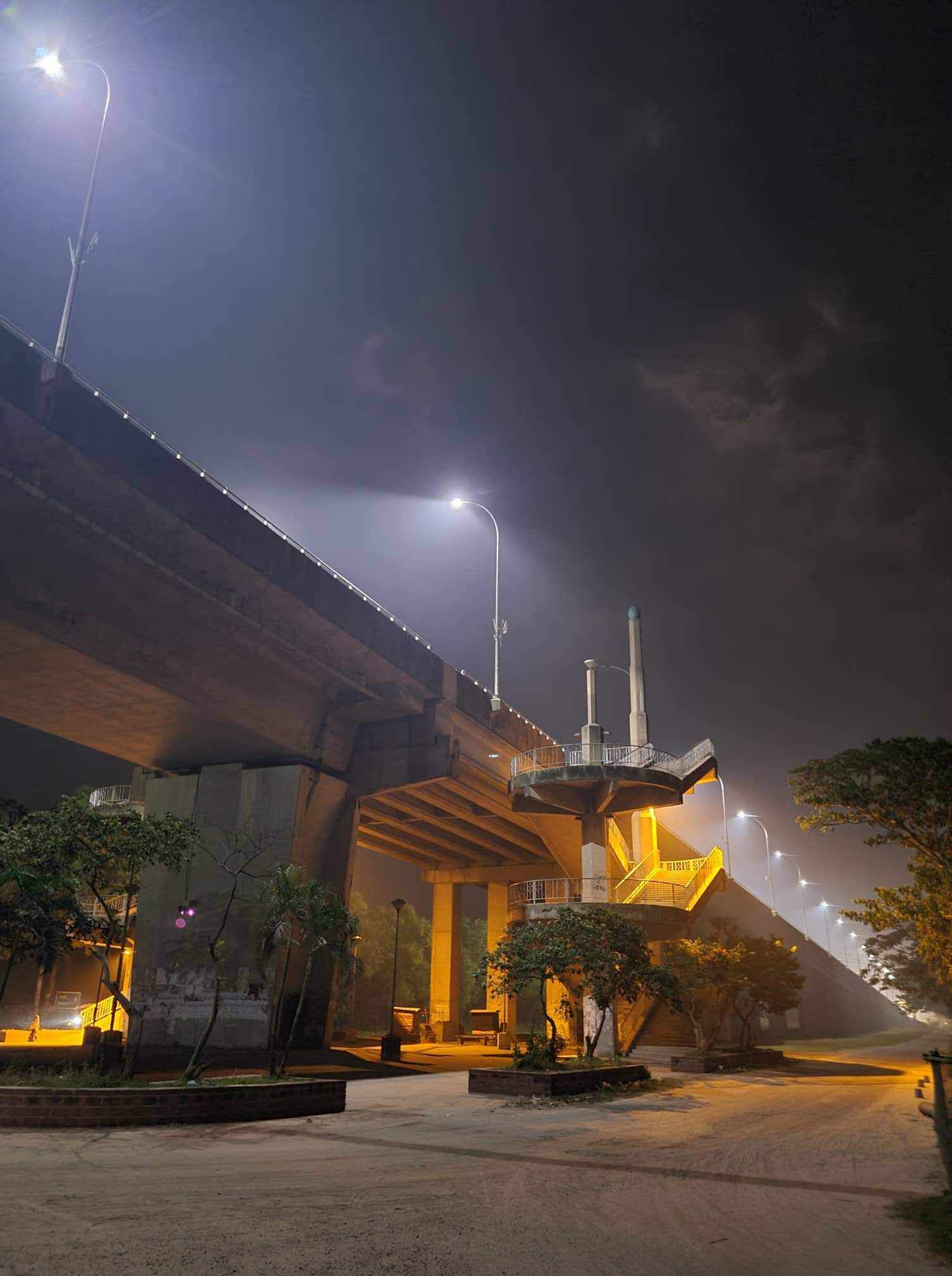
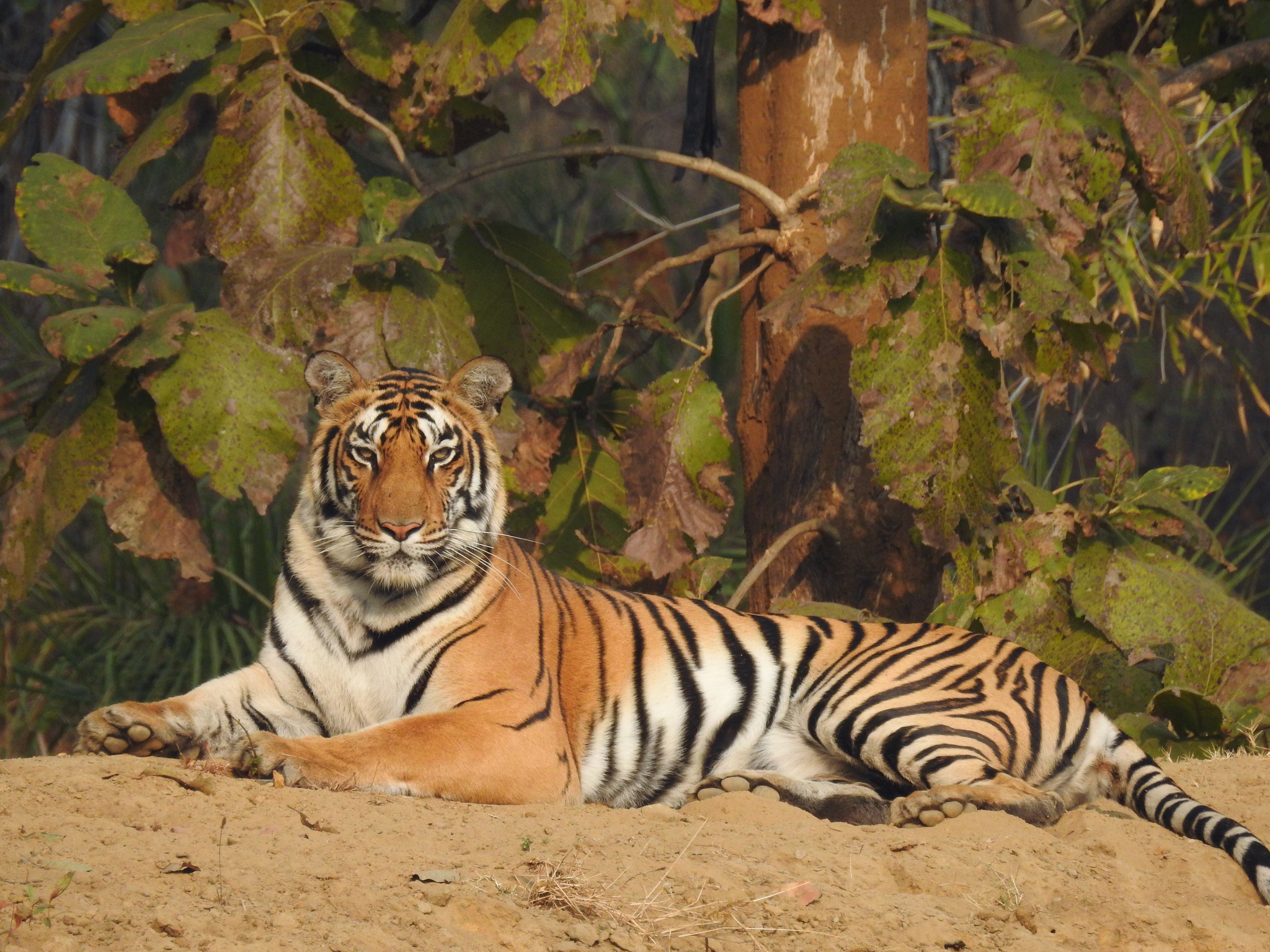
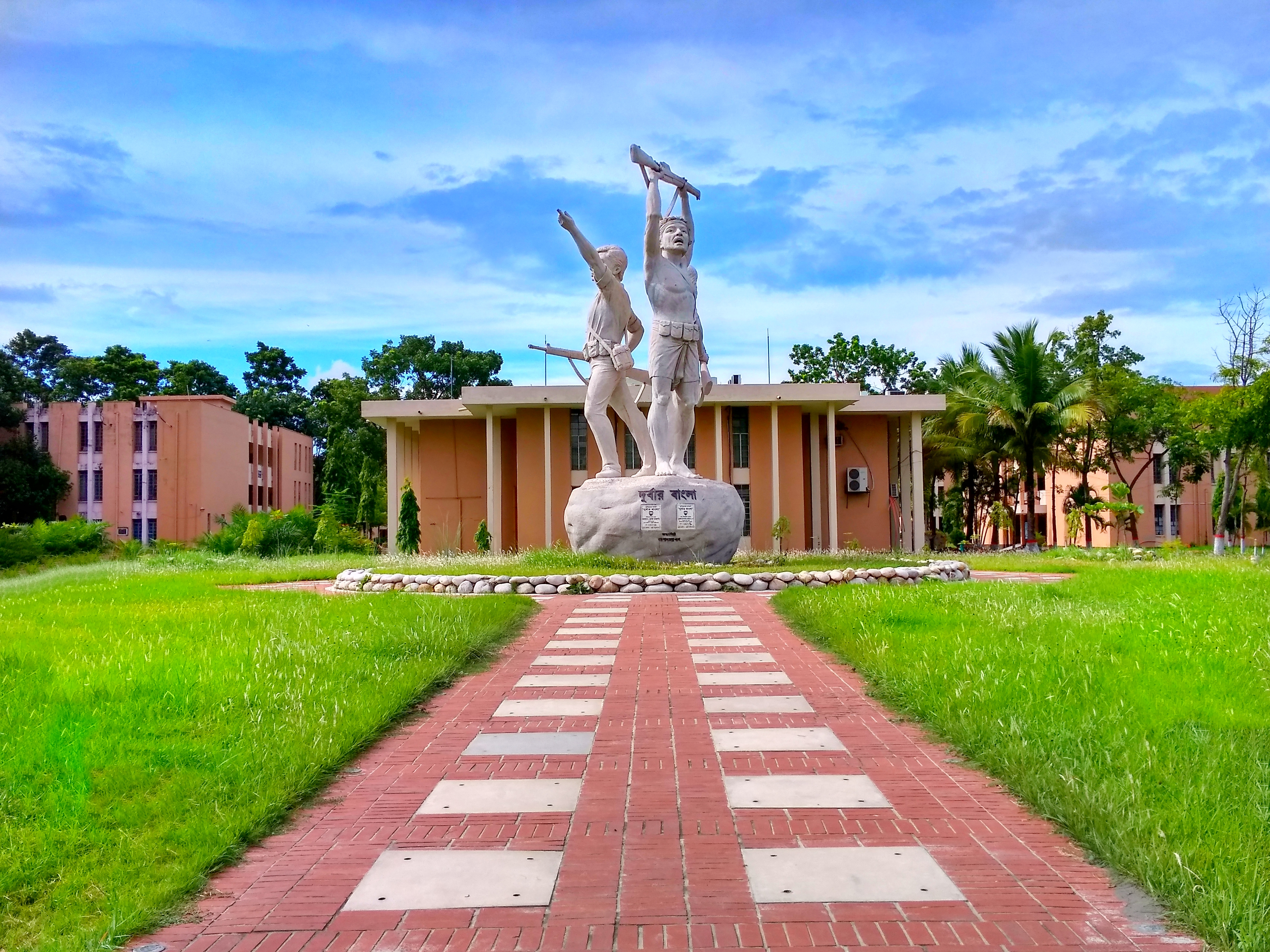
- Clockwise from the top: Khulna Shipyard, Royal Bengal Tiger, Durbar Bangla Monument at KUET and Khan Jahan Ali Bridge

- Location of Khulna District in Bangladesh
- Interactive map of Khulna district
- Coordinates: 22.8255°N 89.5555°E
- Country: Bangladesh
- Division: Khulna
- Established: 1882
- Headquarters: Khulna

Government
  - Deputy Commissioner: Mohammad Helal Hossain, PAA

Area
  - Total: 4,394.45 km^{2} (1,696.71 sq mi)

Population (2022)
  - Total: 2,613,385
  - Density: 594.701/km^{2} (1,540.27/sq mi)
- Time zone: UTC+06:00 (BST)
- Postal code: 9000
- Area code: 041
- ISO 3166 code: BD-27
- HDI (2019): 0.690 medium · 3rd of 20
- Website: www.dckhulna.gov.bd

Khulna District upazila geocode map

Khulna District (Bengali: খুলনা জেলা) is a district of Bangladesh. It is located in the Khulna Division, bordered in the north by Jashore District and Narail District, in the south by the Bay of Bengal, in the east by Bagerhat District, and the west by Satkhira District. It was the first sub-division of the United Bengal Province established in 1842. On 1 June 1882, by notification of the official gazette published from Kolkata, Khulna and Bagerhat sub-division of Jashore district and Satkhira sub-division of 24 Parganas district together formed the new district of Khulna.

== Geography and climate ==
Khulna District has a total area of 4,389.11 square kilometres (1,694.64 sq mi). It borders Jessore District to the north, Narail District to the northeast, Bagerhat District to the east, the Bay of Bengal to the south, and Satkhira District to the west.

Khulna district is mostly composed of flat plains. The northernmost part of the district, north of Khulna town, comprises deltaic silt deposits and is relatively elevated compared to the rest of the district. The central part of the district is relatively lower in elevation and comprises tidal deltaic deposits. The Sunderbans once covered the majority of the district, but now occupy only the southern part of the district.

The district is divided by numerous rivers and canals. Major rivers in Khulna District include the Rupsa (a continuation of the Bhairab and Atrai), Arpangachhia, Shibsa, Pasur, and Koyra.

== History ==
Khulna saw its rise faster than any other area of Bangladesh due to its geographical and economic importance. Also, settlements dating back to 800-900 CE have been found in Rezakpur village in Khulna's Paikgachha Upazila. Muslim rule established itself in Khulna during the 14th century. The saint Khan Jahan Ali obtained a jagir that encompassed the present-day district. In the 16th century, Maharaja Pratapaditya ruled the present Khulna, Bagerhat and Satkhira districts before being defeated by the Mughal Muslim rulers. The region then became a significant part of the Khalifatabad. It came under British rule after the Battle of Plassey.

== Subdistricts ==
Khulna city us administrated by Khulna City Corporation.

There are 9 Upazilas in the district.

- Batiaghata Upazila
- Dacope Upazila
- Dighalia Upazila
- Dumuria Upazila
- Koyra Upazila
- Paikgachha Upazila
- Phultala Upazila
- Rupsa Upazila
- Terokhada Upazila

== Demographics ==
Historical population
Year	Pop.	±% p.a.
1974	1,386,347	—
1981	1,771,101	+3.56%
1991	2,010,643	+1.28%
2001	2,378,971	+1.70%
2011	2,318,527	−0.26%
2022	2,613,385	+1.09%

According to the 2022 Census of Bangladesh, Khulna District had 670,861 households and a population of 2,613,385, with an average of 3.85 people per household. Among the population, 418,531 inhabitants, or 16.01%, were under 10 years of age. The population density was 595 people per km^{2}. Khulna District had a literacy rate (age 7 and over) of 80.66%, compared to the national average of 74.80%, and a sex ratio of 992 females per 1,000 males. Approximately 40.83% of the population lived in urban areas. The ethnic population was 3,260.

Religion in Khulna District (2022)
Religion	Percent
Islam	78.67%
Hinduism	20.76%
Christianity	0.54%
Others	0.03%

78.67% of the population was Muslim and 20.76% Hindu at the time of the 2022 census. A small minority of Christians constituted 0.54% of the population.

Religion in present-day Khulna District
Religion	1941 (Note: 1941 figures refer to Sadar subdivision of erstwhile Khulna district, excluding territory in Sundarbans Forest thana (which is less than 7000 people for the entire district))		1981		1991		2001		2011		2022	
Religion	Pop.	%	Pop.	%	Pop.	%	Pop.	%	Pop.	%	Pop.	%
Hinduism	366,867	58.29%	501,070	28.29%	517,684	25.75%	540,693	22.73%	525,727	22.68%	542,417	20.76%
Islam	260,869	41.45%	1,240,760	70.06%	1,477,802	73.50%	1,821,119	76.55%	1,776,749	76.63%	2,055,902	78.67%
Christianity	786	0.12%	26,952	1.52%	13,516	0.67%	15,818	0.66%	15,239	0.66%	14,038	0.54%
Others (Note: Including Jainism, Buddhism, Zoroastrianism, Judaism, Ad-Dharmis, or not stated)	896	0.14%	2,319	0.13%	1,641	0.08%	1,341	0.06%	812	0.03%	1,028	0.03%
Total Population	629,418	100%	1,771,101	100%	2,010,643	100%	2,378,971	100%	2,318,527	100%	2,613,385	100%

Khulna was a Hindu-majority part of Bangladesh before Partition, mainly lower-caste, but during the massive riots in the 1950s and 1960s, many of the Hindus there fled to India. The population of Hindus has remained constant since 1981, but their percentage has fallen massively. Christians mainly live in Khulna city and Dacope upazila.

== Education ==
Khulna district has about 1,700 primary and secondary schools, and 320,000 pupils. Notably, 15% of schools lack access to drinking water sources. The most common sources of drinking water for schools in this district are tubewells (55%) and rainwater harvesting systems (20%).

The district contains the following educational institutions:

Schools:

- Government Coronation Secondary Girls' School
- Government Daulatpur Muhsin High School
- Khulna Zilla School

Colleges:

- B.L. College
- Khulna Day Night College
- Govt Majid Memorial City College
- Khulna Women's College
- Khulna Government Model School and College
- Khulna Medical College
- Khulna Dental College
- Khulna Collectorate Public School and College

Universities:

- Khulna University of Engineering & Technology
- Khulna University
- Khulna Agricultural University
- Khulna Medical University

== Healthcare infrastructure ==
The Khulna district has about 300 healthcare centres according to the Facility Registry of the Ministry of Health and Family Welfare. This includes community clinics, union health centres, union health sub-centres, and upazila health complexes.

== See also ==
- Districts of Bangladesh
- Upazilas of Bangladesh
- Districts of Bangladesh
- Divisions of Bangladesh
- Upazila
- Thana
