= Union councils of Khulna District =

Governmental units in Khulna District, Bangladesh

Union councils of Khulna District (Bengali: খুলনা জেলার ইউনিয়ন পরিষদসমূহ) are the smallest rural administrative and local government units in Khulna District of Bangladesh. There are 9 upazilas in Khulna district with 67 Union councils. The list are below:

== Koyra Upazila ==
Koyra Upazila has 7 Unions, 63 Wards, 72 Mauzas/Mahallas, and 131 villages.

- Amadi Union
- Bagali Union
- Moheswaripur Union
- Moharajpur Union
- Koyra Union
- Uttar Bedkashi Union
- Dakshin Bedkashi Union

== Dacope Upazila ==
The administration of Dacope thana was established in 1913 and turned into an Upazila in 1983. It consists of 8 union parishads, 26 mouzas and 107 villages.

- Bajua Union
- Kamarkhola Union
- Tildanga Union
- Sutarkhali Union
- Loudob Union
- Pankhali Union
- Banishanta Union
- Kailashganj Union

== Paikgachha Upazila ==
Paikgacha has 10 unions, 172 mauzas/mahallas, and 212 villages.

- Haridhali Union
- Garaikhali Union
- Kapilmuni Union
- Lata Union
- Deluti Union
- Lashkar Union
- Godaipur Union
- Raruli Union
- Chandkhali Union
- Soladana Union

== Batiaghata Upazila ==
Batiaghata has 7 Unions/Wards, 132 Mauzas/Mahallas and 158 villages.

- Batiaghata Union
- Amirpur Union
- Gangarampur Union
- Surkhali Union
- Bhandarkot Union
- Baliadanga Union
- Jalma Union

== Phultala Upazila ==
Phultala has 4 Unions, 18 Mauzas/Mahallas and 25 villages.

- Phultala Union
- Damodor Union
- Atra Gilatala Union
- Jamira Union

== Dumuria Upazila ==
Dumuria Upazila is derived under Dumuria Upazila Parishad. Dumuria has 14 Unions/Wards, 204 Mauzas/Mahallas and 230 villages.

- Dumuria Union
- Maguraghona Union
- Bhandarpara Union
- Sahos Union
- Rudaghara Union
- Gutudia Union
- Shovna Union
- Kharnia Union
- Atalia Union
- Dhamaliya Union
- Magurkhali Union
- Raghunathpur Union
- Rangpur Union
- Sharafpur Union

== Terokhada Upazila ==
Terokhada upazila has 6 unions/wards, 31 mauzas/mahallas and 96 villages.

- Terokhada Union
- Chagladoho Union
- Barasat Union
- Chasiadaho Union
- Madhupur Union
- Ajgara Union

== Dighalia Upazila ==
Dighalia has 6 Unions, 30 Mauzas/Mahallas, and 41 villages.

- Dighalia Union
- Senhati Union
- Gazirhat Union
- Barakpur Union
- Aranghata Union
- Jogipol Union

== Rupsa Upazila ==
Rupsa has 5 Unions/Wards, 64 Mauzas/Mahallas and 75 villages.

- Aichgati Union
- Shrifaltala Union
- Naihati Union
- TSB Union
- Ghatvog Union
