= Bishnu Chattopadhyay =

Bengali revolutionary and politician

- বিষ্ণু চট্টোপাধ্যায়
- Born: April 1910; Khulna District, Bengal Presidency, British Raj
- Died: 11 April 1971 (aged 60–61)
- Cause of death: Killed by genocidal Razakar forces
- Other name: Bistu Thakur
- Known for: Leader of the Tebhaga Movement
- Political party: Communist Party of India; Communist Party of East Pakistan
- Movement: Tebhaga movement Independence of Bangladesh; Bangladesh Liberation War

Bishnu Chattopadhyay (Bengali: বিষ্ণু চট্টোপাধ্যায়; April 1910 – 11 April 1971) popularly known as Bistu Thakur, was a Bangladeshi politician who was killed in the Bangladesh Liberation War. He was an Indian independence movement activist and provided leadership to the Tebhaga peasant movement that developed in the 1940s in undivided Bengal.

== Early life ==
Chattopadhyay was born into a zamindar family of Khulna District, Bengal Presidency, British Raj. His father was Radhacharan Chattopadhyay. While studying at Naihati village school, he left home and was attracted to Sannyas life. After a few days he returned home and joined in revolutionary politics. His brother Narayan Chattopadhyay and sister Bhanu Devi were also connected with the secret anti-British activities under the disguise of the Jessore Khulna Youth Society.

== Career ==
While working in Khalispur Swaraj Ashram, Chattopadhyay was first arrested in 1929 in connection with a case of political dacoity. But released without having evidence. He participated in the civil disobedience movement and was detained under the Bengal Criminal Case Act on 2 May 1930. In the next three years of imprisonment, he became influenced by Marxism from communist leaders like Bhabani Sen, Pramatha Bhaumik and Abdur Rezzak Khan. Soon after his release, he became a member of the Communist Party of India and started work as a peasant organiser.

Chattopadhyay constructed the Shovana Dam over the Shakhabahi River and Nabeki Dam, organising thousands of farmers in front of the goons of landlords and imperial police forces. In 1940, under his leadership, 21 thousand acres of land were distributed to the landless people. Chattopadhyay became a heroic figure of the peasant uprising in the Dumuria and Batiaghata areas of Khulna District. His name itself became a myth to the common people. He was popularly known as Bishtu Thakur. He organised peasants' conference in 1939 and 1944 covering two districts. In the Maubhag area, a regional peasant conference was also organised by him in 1946. Before and after the partition of Bengal (1947), he remained under preventive detention and was tortured for 24 years of his life. One of his fellow inmates in Khulna jail was Sheikh Mujibur Rahman, who later became the founding president of Bangladesh.

Chattopadhyay was a man of versatile talents. He made night school for the peasants and an adult education center, Lokshikkha Sansad, under Visva-Bharati University. He had experience with agricultural science and veterinary treatments. In 1969 he also published a collection of his articles named Mehanati Manush.

== Death ==
On 11 April 1971, he was brutally murdered by the Razakar and Muslim League agents during the Bangladesh Liberation War.
