= Shoilmari River =

Location
- Country: Bangladesh
- Division: Khulna Division
- District: Khulna District
- Upazila: Batiaghata Upazila

Physical characteristics
- Source
  - location: Lowlands of Dumuria Upazila
  - coordinates: 22.9204°N 89.4349°E
- Mouth
  - location: Kajibacha river
  - coordinates: 22.7715°N 89.4755°E
- Length: 22 km (14 mi)
- Width
  - average: 30 m (100 ft)

Shoilmari River is a small river of Bangladesh located in the south-west of Khulna District. The river is 22 kilometres (14 mi) long and its average width is 30 metres (100 ft). According to the Bangladesh Water Development Board it is the number 89 river of the south-western region.

== Location ==
This river is located in Dumuria and Batiaghata Upazilas of Khulna District.
