= Polli Sree College =

- পল্লী শ্রী কলেজ

Location
- Madertala, Dumuria Upazila, Khulna District; Bangladesh
- Coordinates: 22.7548°N 89.3595°E

Information
- Established: 1944
- Website: pollisreecollege.com

Polli Sree College (Bengali: পল্লী শ্রী কলেজ) is an intermediate college in Bangladesh. It is located in the village of Madertala in Dumuria Upazila under Khulna District. It was established in 1994. It originated from a Polli Sree School.
