= Rudaghara =

Village in Khulna Division, Bangladesh

Coordinates: 22.8598°N 89.3787°E

Rudaghara is a small village in Dumuria Upazila of Khulna Division, Bangladesh.
