= Koyra Union =

Koyra Union কয়রা ইউনিয়ন
- Union
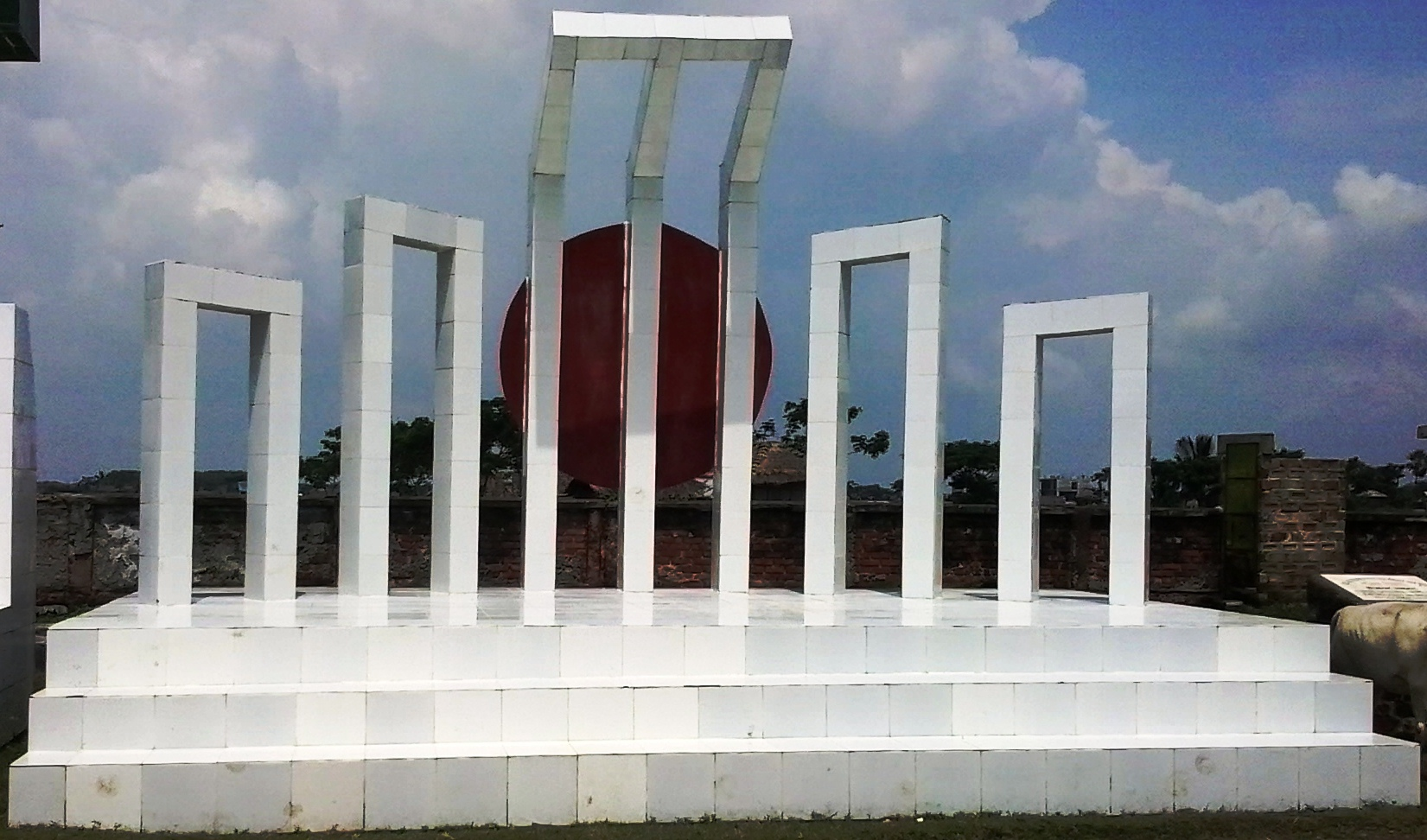
- Shahid Minar of Koyra Upazila

- Location in Bangladesh
- Coordinates: 22.3493°N 89.2860°E
- Country: Bangladesh
- Division: Khulna Division
- District: Khulna District
- Upazila: Koyra Upazila

Government
  - Type: Union council
- Time zone: UTC+6 (BST)
- Website: koyraup.khulna.gov.bd

Koyra Union (Bengali: কয়রা ইউনিয়ন) is a union parishad of Koyra Upazila of Khulna District, in Khulna Division, Bangladesh.

== Geography ==
Koyra Union has an area of 8250 acres (20.5 sq km). Koyra Union is located at the Koyra Sadar of Koyra Upazila. It shares borders with Moharajpur Union to the north, Dakkhin Bedkasi and Kapotaksha River located In the south, To the east Shakbaria River and Sundarbans, to the west are the Kapotaksha River and Shamnagar upazila of Satkhira district.

== Educational institutions ==
- Koyra Madinabad Model Secondary School
