= Shrifaltala Union =

Place in Khulna Division, Bangladesh

Shrifaltala Union শ্রীফলতলা ইউনিয়ন
- Union
- Location in Bangladesh
- Coordinates: 22.8317°N 89.5987°E
- Country: Bangladesh
- Division: Khulna Division
- District: Khulna District
- Upazila: Rupsa Upazila

Government
  - Type: Union council
- Time zone: UTC+6 (BST)
- Website: srifoltolaup.khulna.gov.bd

Shrifaltala Union (Bengali: শ্রীফলতলা ইউনিয়ন) is a union parishad in Rupsa Upazila of Khulna District, in Khulna Division, Bangladesh.
