= Masjidkur Mosque =

Archaeological site of Bangladesh

- মসজিদকুঁড় মসজিদ
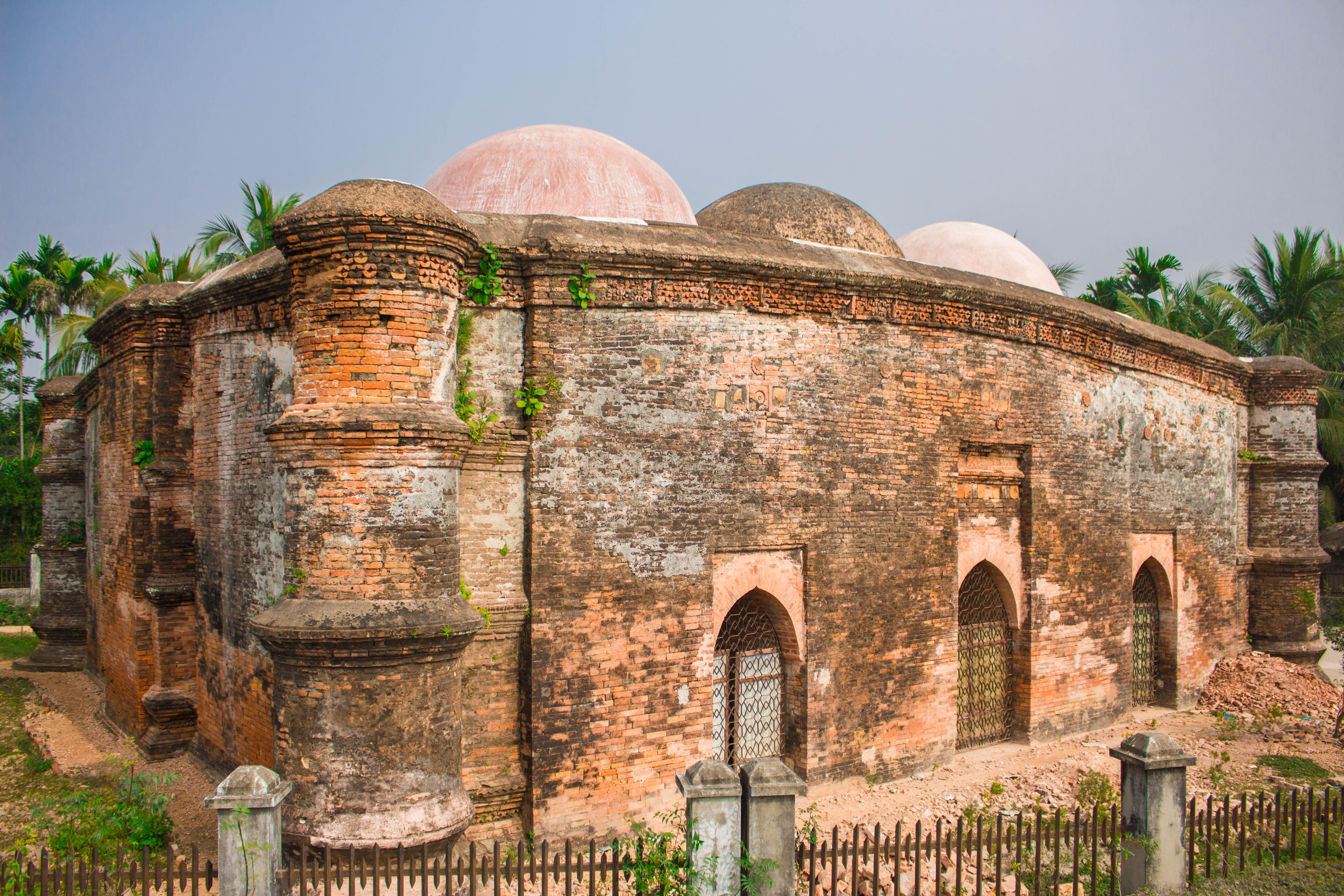
- Front view of the mosque

- Location of the mosque in Khulna division Bangladesh

Religion
- Affiliation: Islam
- Ecclesiastical or organisational status: Mosque

Location
- Location: Koyra Upazila, Khulna District
- Country: Bangladesh
- Administration: Department of Archaeology
- Coordinates: 22°28′44″N 89°17′8″E

Architecture
- Architect: Khan Jahan Ali
- Type: Mosque architecture
- Dome: Nine

The Masjidkur Mosque (Bengali: মসজিদকুঁড় মসজিদ) is a Bengal Sultanate period mosque and archaeological site, located in Koyra Upazila, in the Khulna District of Bangladesh. The Kapotaksha River is beside the mosque and very close to the Sundarbans.

== History ==
After the Partition of India in 1947, the mosque was discovered from before the area was full of forests and trees. Later on this excavation was discovered and the mosque below the ground was discovered. There was no inscription found during the discovery of the mosque, and there is no correct idea about its construction time. Masjidkur was named as the mosque was dug from the deep ground. Archaeologists believe that this mosque was most likely built by Bura Khan and Fateh Khan, disciples of Khan Jahan Ali, who ruled this village as Kacharis during the period 1450–1490. The mosque was built nine-domed, therefore naming it Masjidkur.

== Architecture ==
Each wall of the mosque is approximately 2.1 metres (7 ft) wide. It was also constructed in the square that has an outer length of 16.76 m (55.0 ft) and an inner length of 12.19 metres (40.0 ft). There are three gates in front of the mosque and also four stone pillars made in the interior. There are nine domes in three rows, including walls and pillars.

The mosque's four exterior corners are accentuated by solid circular towers that extend to the roof level. Excluding the qibla wall, each of the other three sides features three arched openings, with the central arch larger than those on either side. The qibla wall is recessed internally with three semicircular mihrab niches aligned with the eastern archways, the central mihrab being slightly larger and projecting outward at the rear. The building's cornices exhibit a gentle curve.

Originally, the mosque was adorned with terracotta ornamentation, remnants of which remain visible in the mihrab niches and the spandrels of the archways. Notable decorative motifs include rosettes, jali work, lozenges, and floral scrolls.

In its layout, the mosque mirrors the square nine-domed mausoleum of Sikandar Shah, located near the Adina Mosque at Hazrat Pandua, representing one of the earliest known examples of this architectural form in Bengal.

== See also ==
- Islam in Bangladesh
- List of mosques in Bangladesh
- List of archaeological sites in Bangladesh
