= TSB Union =

Place in Khulna Division, Bangladesh

TSB Union টিএসবি ইউনিয়ন
- Union
- Location in Bangladesh
- Coordinates: 22.7989°N 89.6423°E
- Country: Bangladesh
- Division: Khulna Division
- District: Khulna District
- Upazila: Rupsa Upazila

Government
  - Type: Union council
- Time zone: UTC+6 (BST)
- Website: tsbup.khulna.gov.bd

TSB Union (Bengali: টিএসবি ইউনিয়ন) abbreviated as Tilak Swalpa Bahirdia Union is a union parishad in Rupsa Upazila of Khulna District, in Khulna Division, Bangladesh.

== Education ==
=== Higher secondary schools ===
- Kajdia Collegiate School
- Patharghata Secondary School
- Kajdia Secondary Girls' School
- Kishore Kollan Secondary School
- Home of Joy School

=== Madrasahs ===
- Khadijatul Kubra (R) Mahila Madrasah
- Rupsa Darussunntat Dakhil Madrasah
- Tilak Siddiqui-e Akbar Dakhil Madrasa
