= Sachiadah Union =

Sachiadah Union সাচিয়াদহ ইউনিয়ন
- Union
- Country: Bangladesh
- Division: Khulna Division
- District: Khulna District
- Upazila: Terokhada Upazila

Government
  - Type: Union council
- Time zone: UTC+6 (BST)
- Website: sochiadahoup.khulna.gov.bd

Sachiadah Union (Bengali: সাচিয়াদহ ইউনিয়ন) is a union parishad in Terokhada Upazila of Khulna District, in Khulna Division, Bangladesh.
