= Madertala =

Madartala
- Location in Bangladesh
- Coordinates: 22°45′N 89°21′E
- Country: Bangladesh
- Division: Khulna Division
- District: Khulna District
- Time zone: UTC+6 (Bangladesh Time)

Madartala is a village in Magurkhali Union of Khulna District in the Khulna Division of southwestern Bangladesh. As of the 2011 Bangladesh census, it had a population of 1,375.
