= Dighalia Upazila =

Dighalia দিঘলিয়া
- Upazila
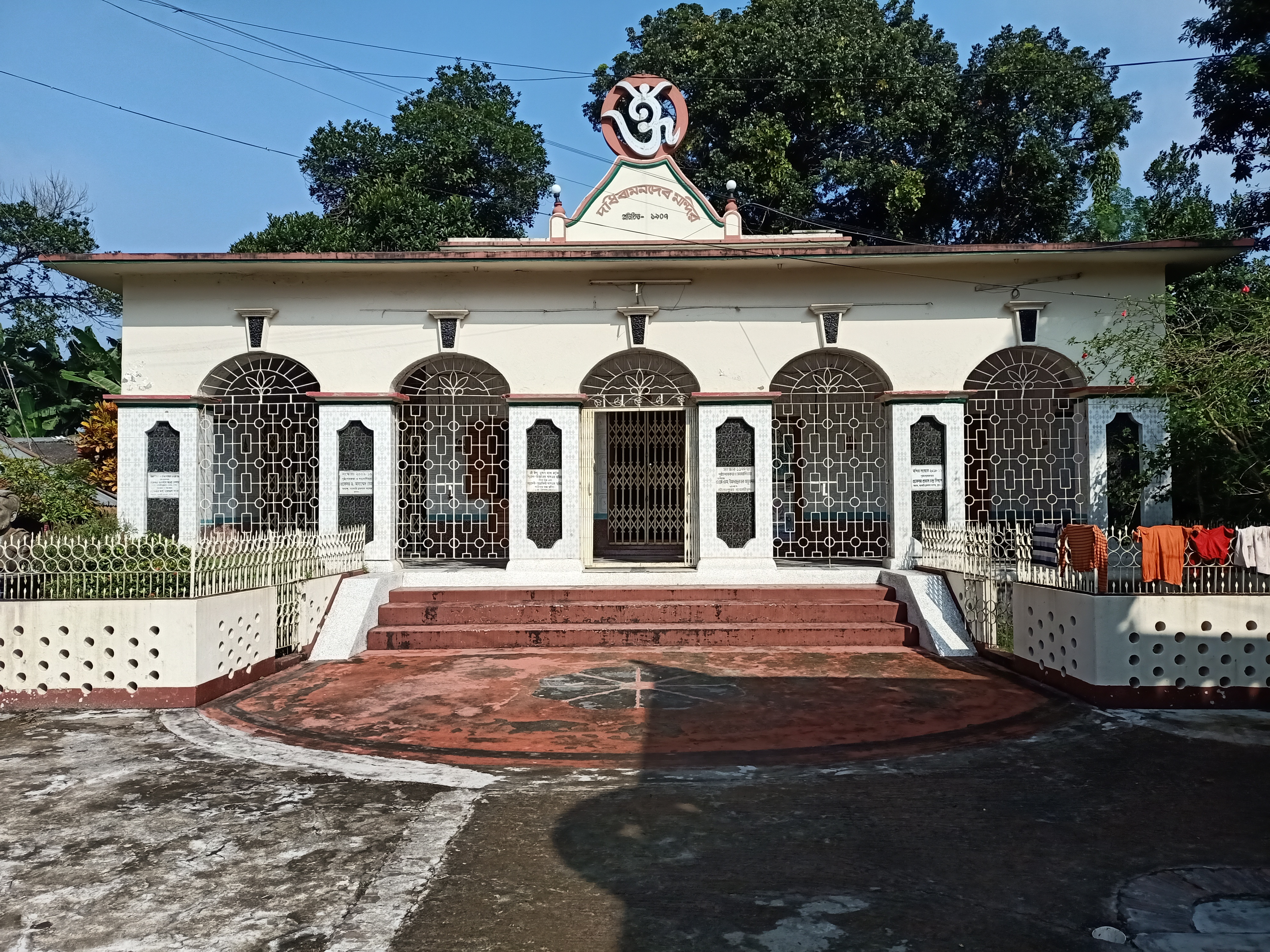
- Government Brajalal College Temple, Dighalia

- Coordinates: 22°54.5′N 89°32′E
- Country: Bangladesh
- Division: Khulna
- District: Khulna

Area
  - Total: 77.16 km^{2} (29.79 sq mi)

Population (2022)
  - Total: 167,025
  - Density: 2,165/km^{2} (5,606/sq mi)
- Time zone: UTC+6 (BST)
- Postal code: 9220
- Area code: 04033
- Website: Official Map of Dighalia

Dighalia Upazila mauza geocode map

Dighalia (Bengali: দিঘলিয়া) is an upazila of Khulna District in the Division of Khulna, Bangladesh.

== Geography ==
Dighalia is located at 22.9083°N 89.5333°E. It has 26,797 households and a total area of 77.16 km^{2}.

== Demographics ==
Religions in Dighalia Upazila (2022)
Religion	Percent
Islam	88.38%
Hinduism	11.30%
Other or not stated	0.32%

According to the 2022 Bangladeshi census, Dighalia Upazila had 40,872 households and a population of 167,025. 8.91% were under 5 years of age. Dighalia had a literacy rate of 81.68%: 84.00% for males and 79.36% for females, with a sex ratio of 100.35 males per 100 females. 28,713 (17.19%) lived in urban areas.

As of the 2011 Census of Bangladesh, Dighalia upazila had 26,797 households and a population of 115,585. 23,352 (20.20%) were under 10 years of age. Dighalia had an average literacy rate of 54.28%, compared to the national average of 51.8%, and a sex ratio of 1005 females per 1000 males. The entire population was rural.

According to the 1991 Bangladesh census, Dighalia had a population of 107840. Males constitute 53% of the population, and females 47%. The population aged 18 or over was 56,104. Dighalia has an average literacy rate of 39.4% (7+ years), compared to the national average of 32.4%.

== Administration ==
Dighalia Upazila is divided into Dighalia Municipality and six union parishads: Aranghata, Barakpur, Dighalia, Gazirhat, Jogipol, and Senhati. The union parishads are subdivided into 29 mauzas and 43 villages.

== See also ==
- Upazilas of Bangladesh
- Districts of Bangladesh
- Divisions of Bangladesh
