= Aichgati Union =

Place in Khulna Division, Bangladesh

Aichgati Union আইচগাতী ইউনিয়ন
- Union
- Location in Bangladesh
- Coordinates: 22.8298°N 89.5689°E
- Country: Bangladesh
- Division: Khulna Division
- District: Khulna District
- Upazila: Rupsa Upazila

Government
  - Type: Union council
- Time zone: UTC+6 (BST)
- Website: aichgatiup.khulna.gov.bd

Aichgati Union (Bengali: আইচগাতী ইউনিয়ন) is a union parishad in Rupsa Upazila of Khulna District, in Khulna Division, Bangladesh.
