= Dakshin Bedkashi Union =

Dakshin Bedkashi Union দক্ষিণ বেদকাশী ইউনিয়ন
- Union
- Location in Bangladesh
- Coordinates: 22.2380°N 89.3182°E
- Country: Bangladesh
- Division: Khulna Division
- District: Khulna District
- Upazila: Koyra Upazila
- Established: 1973

Government
  - Type: Union council
- Time zone: UTC+6 (BST)
- Website: southbedkashiup.khulna.gov.bd

Dakshin Bedkashi Union (Bengali: দক্ষিণ বেদকাশী ইউনিয়ন) is a union parishad of Koyra Upazila of Khulna District, in Khulna Division, Bangladesh.
