= Paikgachha Upazila =

Paikgacha পাইকগাছা
- Upazila
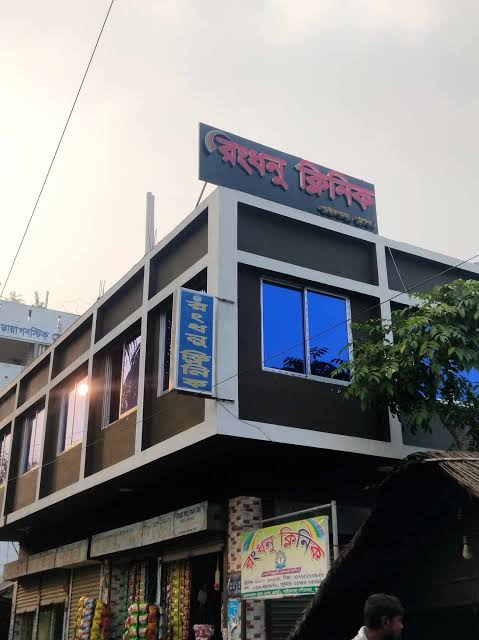
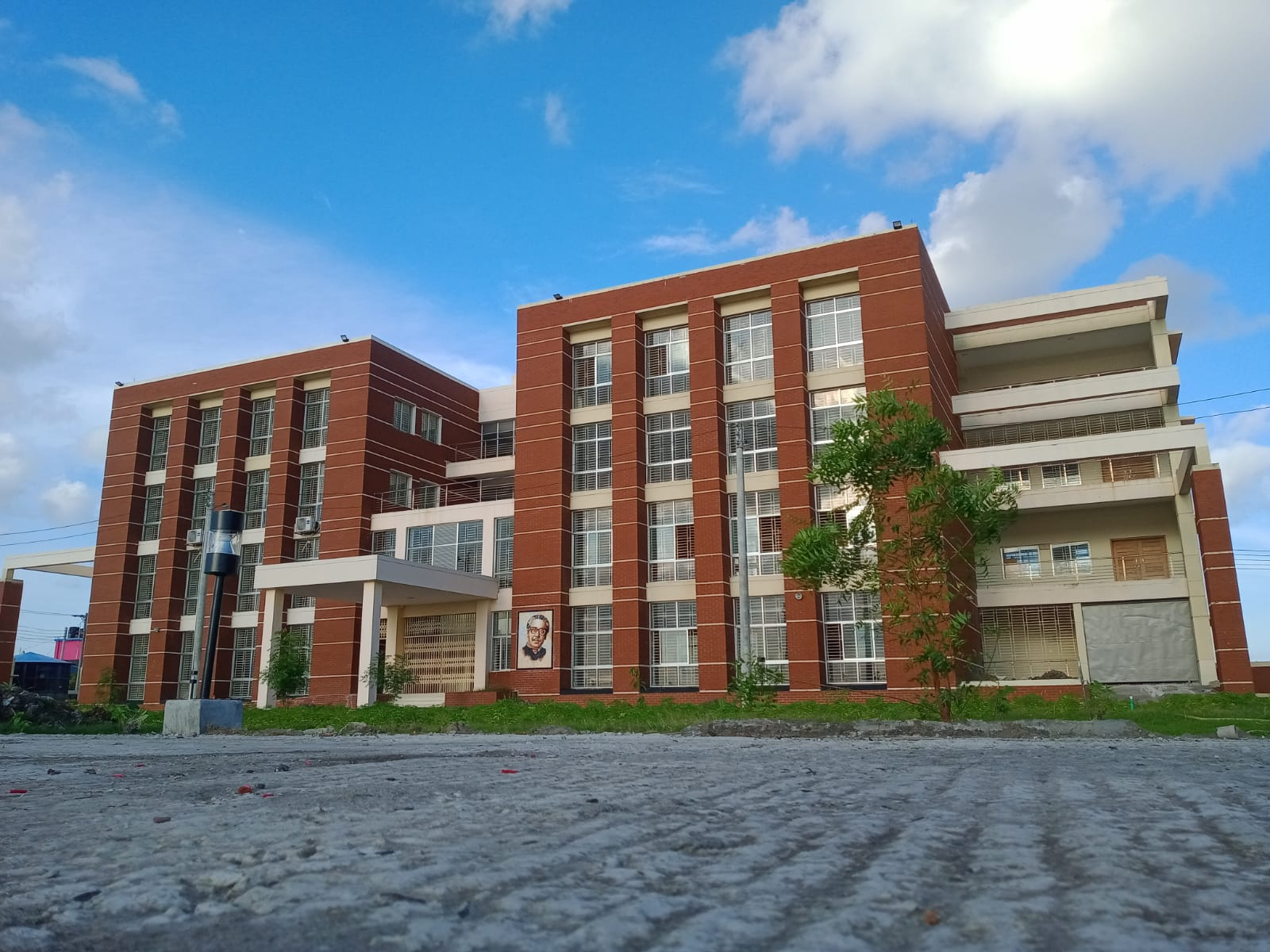
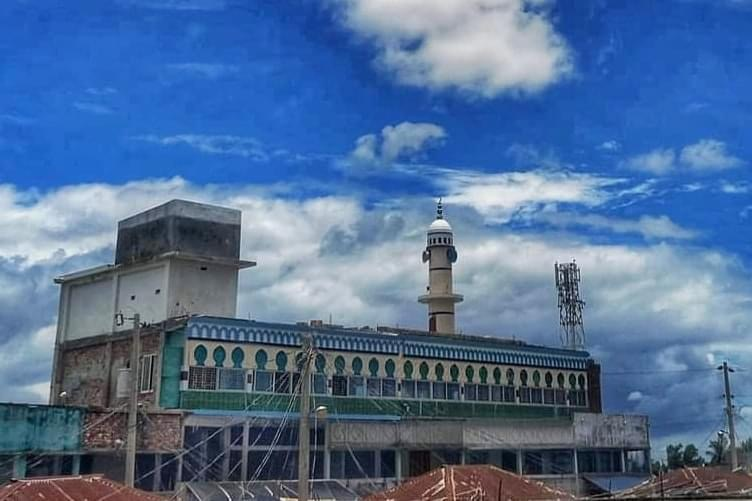
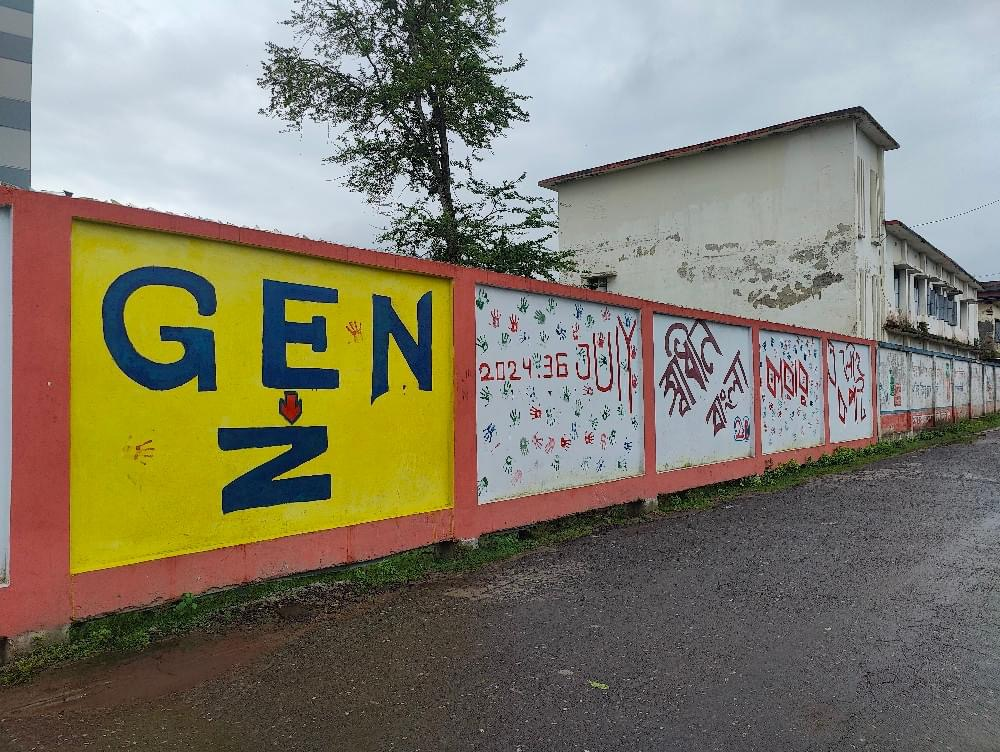
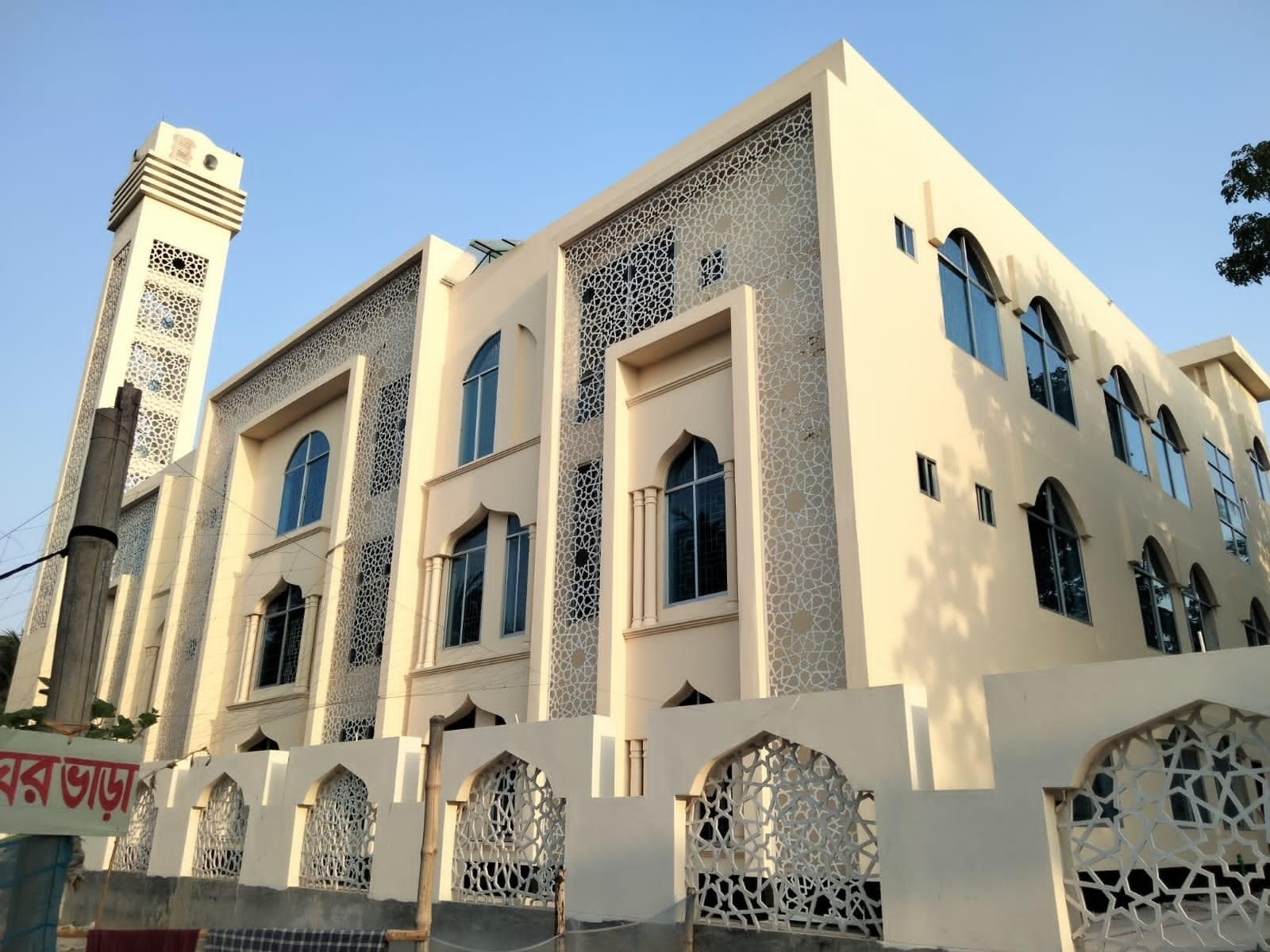
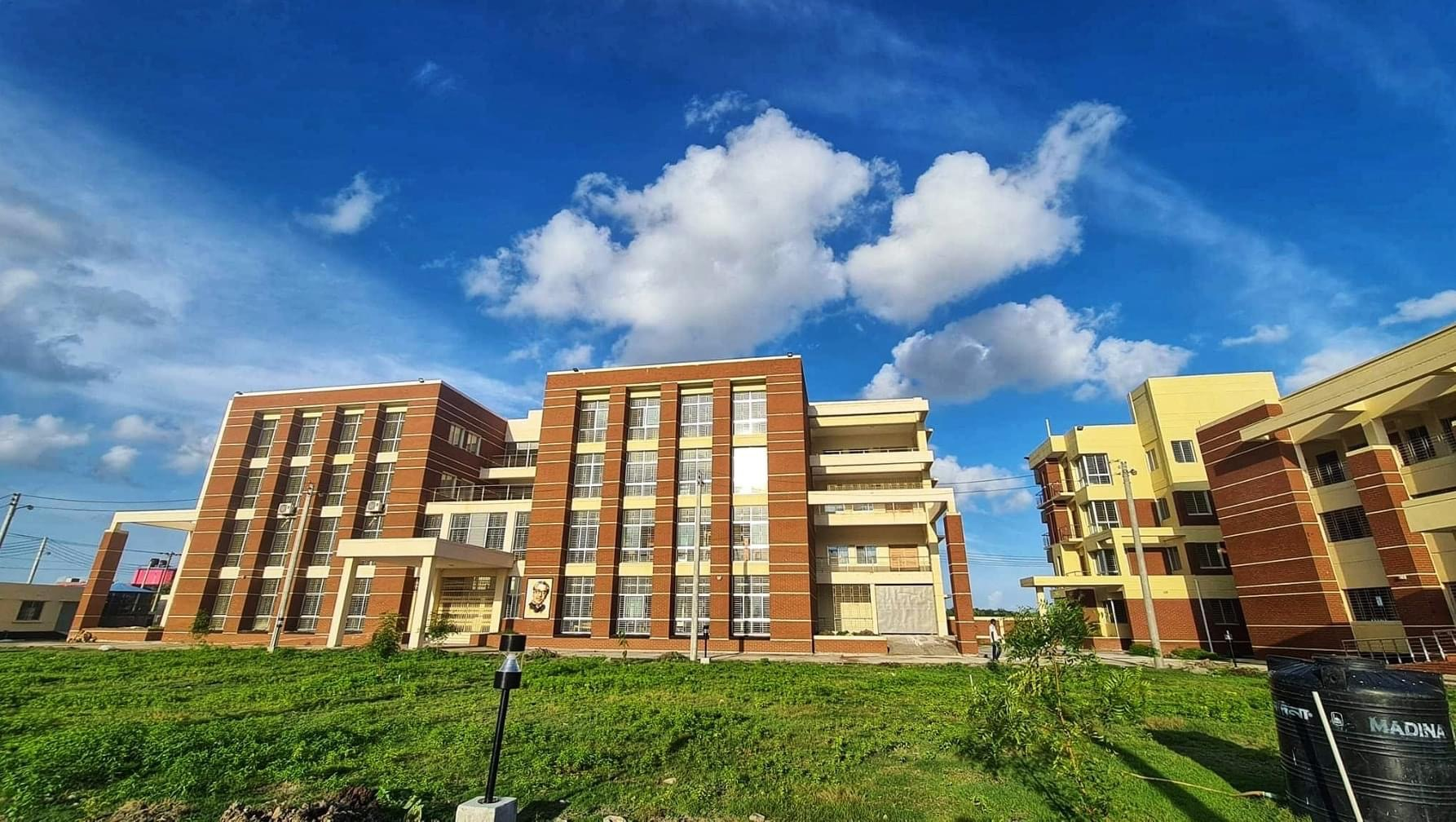
- Emerging urban Paikgacha Paikgacha Technical Institute Mosque in Paikgacha fish market 2024 Student movement Paikgacha Paikgacha Upazila Model Mosque Developing Paikgacha
- Interactive map of Paikgacha
- Country: Bangladesh
- Division: Khulna
- District: Khulna

Government
  - Political Leader: Md. Rashiduzzaman

Area
  - Total: 411.19 km^{2} (158.76 sq mi)

Population (2022)
  - Total: 286,209
  - Density: 696.05/km^{2} (1,802.8/sq mi)
- Time zone: UTC+6 (BST)
- Postal code: 9280
- Area code: 04027
- Website: paikgasa.khulna.gov.bd

Paikgacha (Bengali: পাইকগাছা) is an upazila of the Khulna District in the division of Khulna, Bangladesh. It is an important centre and gateway of the southern Khulna District.

Paikgachha Upazila mauza geocode map

== Geography ==
Paikgachha is located at 22.5889°N 89.3361°E. It has a total area of 411.19 km^{2}.

=== Rivers ===
There are a significant number of rivers in Paikgachha Upazila. The rivers here are Shibsa River, Kapotaksha River, Minhaz, Karulia, Vadra, Deluti etc

== Demographics ==
According to the 2022 Bangladeshi census, Paikgachha Upazila had 73,998 households and a population of 286,209. 8.03% were under 5 years of age. Paikgachha had a literacy rate of 75.17%: 80.00% for males and 70.34% for females, with a sex ratio of 100.36 males per 100 females. 37,751 (13.19%) lived in urban areas.

Religions in Paikgachha Upazila (2022)
Religion	Percent
Islam	70.66%
Hinduism	28.99%
Christianity	0.35%

Population by religion in Union/Paurashava
Union/Paurashava	Muslim	Hindu	Others
Paikgachha Paurashava	13,926	5,236	384
Chandkhali Union	"42,700	5,259	111
Deluti Union	5,495	12,301	0
Godaipur Union	20,406	3,556	53
Garaikhali Union	13,721	10,529	215
Haridhali Union	20,682	5,880	41
Kapilmuni Union	28,868	7,261	31
Lashkar Union	14,058	7,351	97
Lata Union	2,984	8,019	1
Raruli Union	24,990	8,597	39
Soladana Union	14,389	8,976	36

🟩 Muslim majority 🟧 Hindu majority

As of the 2011 Census of Bangladesh, Paikgachha upazila had 59,873 households and a population of 247,983. 45,976 (18.54%) were under 10 years of age. Paikgachha had an average literacy rate of 52.83%, compared to the national average of 51.8%, and a sex ratio of 1001 females per 1000 males. 16,017 (6.46%) of the population lived in urban areas.

At the time of the 1991 Bangladesh census, Paikgachha had a population of 225,085, of which 51.14% was male, and 48.86% female. 117,629 of the citizens were aged eighteen or older. At the time, Paikgachha had an average literacy rate of 32.6% for those aged 7 years or older compared with the national average of 32.4%.

== Administration ==
Paikgacha Upazila is divided into Paikgacha Municipality and ten union parishads: Chandkhali, Deluti, Godaipur, Goroikhali, Horidhali, Kopilmuni, Loskor, Lota, Raruli, and Soladana. The union parishads are subdivided into 149 mauzas and 212 villages.

Paikgacha Municipality is subdivided into 9 wards and 5 mahallas.

== Transport ==
Paikgachha Bridge connects Paikgachha with Koyra Upazila successfully. The main route of transport to Paikgachha from other parts of the country is by bus.

== Education ==
=== Secondary school ===
- Lakshmikhola Collegiate School
- Sreekanthopur K.R Junior High School
- Shaheed Kamrul Memorial High school Baka Bazar
- Paikgachha Govt. Boys School
- Haridhali Union High School
- Kharia High School, Kharia, Paikgacha
- Bholanath Sukhada Sundari Secondary School
- Shaheed Zia Girls High School
- Kharia Nabarun Secondary School, Kharia, Paikgacha
- Paikgachha Govt. Girls School
- Chandkhali Multilateral Secondary School
- K.D.S High School, Paikgacha, Khulna
- PTD Technical and Vocational School
- Kapilmuni Sahachari Vidya Mandir
- Mathbati G.G.P.G Dakhil Madrasah, Paikgachha, Khulna
- K.G.H.F Mowkhali United Academy, Mowkhali, Paikgacha, Khulna
- Soladana Secondary School, Soladana, Paikgacha
- Amurkata Rondhanu Madhyamic Bidyaioy, Soladana, Paikgacha
- Charbandha High School, Charbandha, Soladana, Pikgacha
- Katipara High School
- R.K.B.K. Horischandra Collegiate Institution (Raruli, Katipara, Baka, Kharsha)
- Raruli Bhubon Mohini Girls School
- Wazed Ali High School
- Shaheed Kamrul Memorial High School (Baka, Raruli, Paikgacha)

=== College ===
- Lakshmikhola Collegiate School
- Sreekanthopur K.R College
- Paikgachha Govt.College
- Habibnagor M K D S B Fazil Madrasah
- Chandkhali College
- K.D.S High School, Paikgacha, Khulna
- Fasiar Rahman Mohila Degree College, Paikgachha
- Alomtala Sinior Fazil Madrasah
- Gojalia Kalua Alim Madrasah
- Kapilmuni Sahachary Vidya Mandir School and College
- Kapilmuni College
- Haridhali Kapilmuni Mohila College
- Sardar Abu Hossen College, Soladana
- Shahid Ayub and Musa Memorial College, Garaikhali
- Kalinagar College, Kalinagar, Deluti.
- R.K.B.K. Horischandra Collegiate Institution (Raruli, Katipara, Baka, Kharsha)

== Notable residents ==
- Sheikh Razzak Ali, the Member of Parliament for constituency Khulna-10 from 1979 to 1986 and for Khulna-2 from 1991 until 2001, was born in Paikgachha in 1928.
- Qazi Imdadul Haq, writer, was born in Gadaipur in 1882.
- Prafulla Chandra Ray, chemist, educator and entrepreneur, was born in Raruli-Katipara village in 1861.

== See also ==
- Water supply and sanitation in Bangladesh
