= Ghatvog Union =

Place in Khulna Division, Bangladesh

Ghatvog Union ঘাটভোগ ইউনিয়ন
- Union
- Location in Bangladesh
- Coordinates: 22.8115°N 89.6412°E
- Country: Bangladesh
- Division: Khulna Division
- District: Khulna District
- Upazila: Rupsa Upazila

Government
  - Type: Union council
- Time zone: UTC+6 (BST)
- Website: ghatvogup.khulna.gov.bd

Ghatvog Union (Bengali: ঘাটভোগ ইউনিয়ন) is a union parishad in Rupsa Upazila of Khulna District, in Khulna Division, Bangladesh.

== Education ==
=== Colleges ===
- Alaipur College (Degree)
- Chandpur College
- Shiyali S.G.C College

=== Higher secondary schools ===
- Alaipur United Secondary School, Rupsa, Khulna
- Anandnagar Ideal Secondary School, Rupsa, Khulna
- Goara Hafizur Rahman Secondary School, Rupsa, Khulna
- Shiali Secondary School Shiali, Rupsa, Khulna
- Bamdanga Secondary School, Bamdanga, Rupsa, Khulna
- Doba Bahumukhi Secondary School, Doba, Rupsa, Khulna
- Pithavog D.G.C Secondary School, Pithavog, Rupsa, Khulna
- Narnia Secondary School, Rupsa, Khulna

=== Madrasas ===
- Madinatul Ulum Qaomi Madrasa
- Anandanagar Atikmhana Madrasa
- Alaipur Ibtedayi Madrasa
- Alaipur Hafezia Madrasa
- Alaipur Neesariya Sheikhpara Madrasa
- Bamandanga Salafia Madrasa
- Chandpur Dakhil Madsasah
