= Ajgara Union =

Ajugara Union আজগড়া ইউনিয়ন
- Union
- Location in Bangladesh
- Coordinates: 22.8674°N 89.6578°E
- Country: Bangladesh
- Division: Khulna Division
- District: Khulna District
- Upazila: Terokhada Upazila

Government
  - Type: Union council
- Time zone: UTC+6 (BST)
- Website: ajgoraup.khulna.gov.bd

Ajugara Union (Bengali: আজগড়া ইউনিয়ন) is a union parishad in Terokhada Upazila of Khulna District, in Khulna Division, Bangladesh.
