= Phultala Upazila =

Phultala ফুলতলা
- Upazila
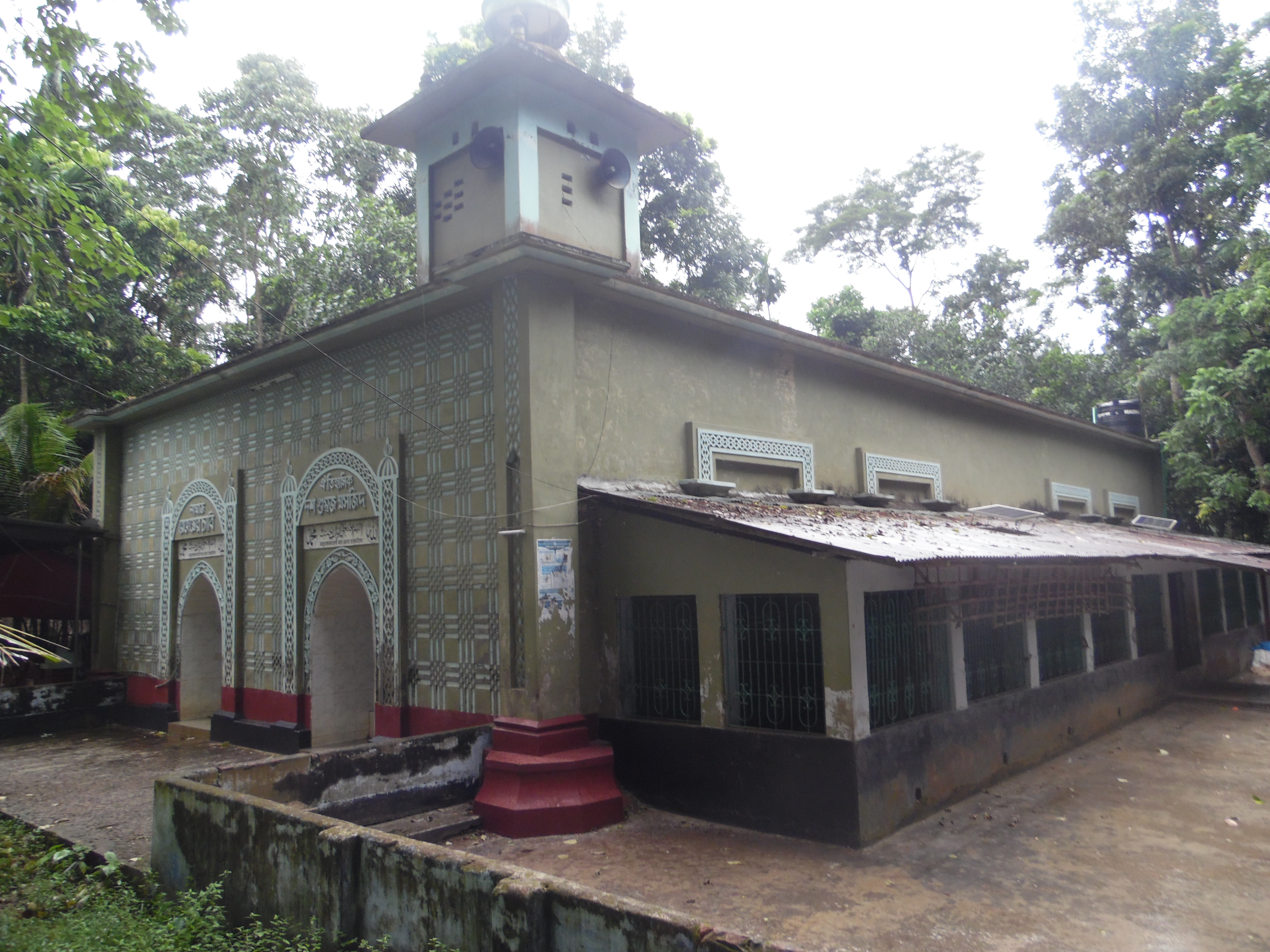
- 10 Dome Mosque, Phultala

- Coordinates: 22°58.5′N 89°27.5′E
- Country: Bangladesh
- Division: Khulna
- District: Khulna

Area
  - Total: 74.33 km^{2} (28.70 sq mi)
- Elevation: 3 m (9.8 ft)

Population (2022)
  - Total: 148,510
  - Density: 1,998/km^{2} (5,175/sq mi)
- Time zone: UTC+6 (BST)
- Postal code: 9210
- Website: Official Map of Phultala

Phultala Upazila mauza geocode map

Phultala (Bengali: ফুলতলা) is an upazila of Khulna District in the Division of Khulna, Bangladesh.

== Geography ==
Phultala is located at 22.9750°N 89.4583°E. It has 19,555 households and total area 74.33 km^{2}.

== Demographics ==
Religions in Phultala Upazila (2022)
Religion	Percent
Islam	91.58%
Hinduism	8.29%
Other or not stated	0.13%

According to the 2022 Bangladeshi census, Phultala Upazila had 37,624 households and a population of 148,510. 8.46% were under 5 years of age. Phultala had a literacy rate of 81.90%: 84.65% for males and 79.19% for females, and a sex ratio of 99.67 males per 100 females. 76,000 (51.18%) lived in urban areas.

As of the 2011 Census of Bangladesh, Phultala upazila had 19,555 households and a population of 83,881. 16,200 (19.31%) were under 10 years of age. Phultala had an average literacy rate of 59.02%, compared to the national average of 51.8%, and a sex ratio of 1005 females per 1000 males. 31,581 (37.65%) of the population lived in urban areas.

As of the 1991 Bangladesh census, Phultala has a population of 67,930. Males constitute 51.01% of the population, and females 48.99%. This Upazila's eighteen up population is 36368. Phultala has an average literacy rate of 41.1% (7+ years), and the national average of 32.4% literate.

== Administration ==
Phultala Upazila is divided into four union parishads: Atra Gilatala, Damodar, Jamira, and Phultala. The union parishads are subdivided into 18 mauzas and 29 villages.

== See also ==
- Upazilas of Bangladesh
- Districts of Bangladesh
- Divisions of Bangladesh
