= Bhandarpara Union =

Bhandarpara Union ভান্ডারপাড়া ইউনিয়ন
- Union
- Location in Bangladesh
- Coordinates: 22.7673°N 89.4487°E
- Country: Bangladesh
- Division: Khulna Division
- District: Khulna District
- Upazila: Dumuria Upazila

Government
  - Type: Union council
- Time zone: UTC+6 (BST)
- Website: vandarparaup.khulna.gov.bd

Bhandarpara Union (Bengali: ভান্ডারপাড়া ইউনিয়ন) is a union parishad in Dumuria Upazila of Khulna District, in Khulna Division, Bangladesh.

== Demography ==
Religion (2022)
| Religion | Percent |
| Hinduism | 54.71% |
| Islam | 45.23% |
| Others | 0.06% |
