= Maguraghona Union =

Maguraghona Union মাগুরাঘোনা ইউনিয়ন
- Union
- Location in Bangladesh
- Coordinates: 22.8133°N 89.2693°E
- Country: Bangladesh
- Division: Khulna Division
- District: Khulna District
- Upazila: Dumuria Upazila

Government
  - Type: Union council
- Time zone: UTC+6 (BST)
- Website: maguraghonaup.khulna.gov.bd

Maguraghona Union (Bengali: মাগুরাঘোনা ইউনিয়ন) is a union parishad in Dumuria Upazila of Khulna District, in Khulna Division, Bangladesh.
