= Koyra Upazila =

Koyra কয়রা
- Upazila
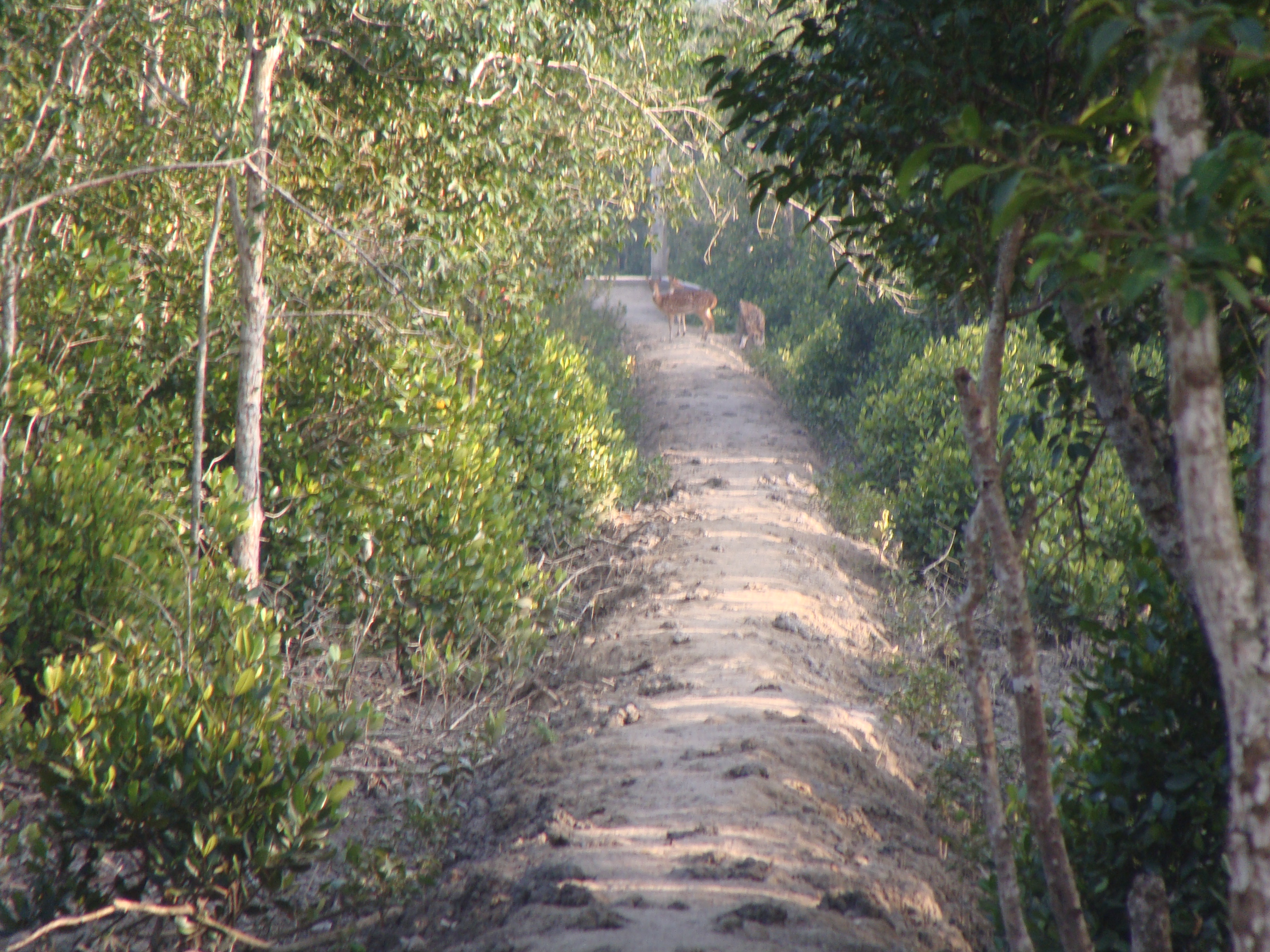
- Mangroves in Sunderbans, Koyra upazila

- Coordinates: 22°20.5′N 89°18′E
- Country: Bangladesh
- Division: Khulna
- District: Khulna
- Thana: 19 November 1979
- Upazila: 7 November 1983

Government
  - MP (Khulna-6): Abul Kalam Azad
  - Upazila Chairman: Vacant

Area
  - Total: 1,775.40 km^{2} (685.49 sq mi)

Population (2022)
  - Total: 220,092
  - Density: 123.968/km^{2} (321.074/sq mi)
- Time zone: UTC+6 (BST)
- Postal code: 9290
- Website: koyra.khulna.gov.bd

Koyra Upazila mauza geocode map

Koyra (Bengali: কয়রা) is an upazila of the Khulna District of Bangladesh. It's the 3rd largest Upazila in Bangladesh after the Shyamnagar (1968 sq km) and Baghaichari (1931 sq km) upazilas.

Water bodies Main rivers: dharla, pasur, arpangachhia, Taldhup, Malancha, kobadak, ball; Koyra canal is notable.

== History ==
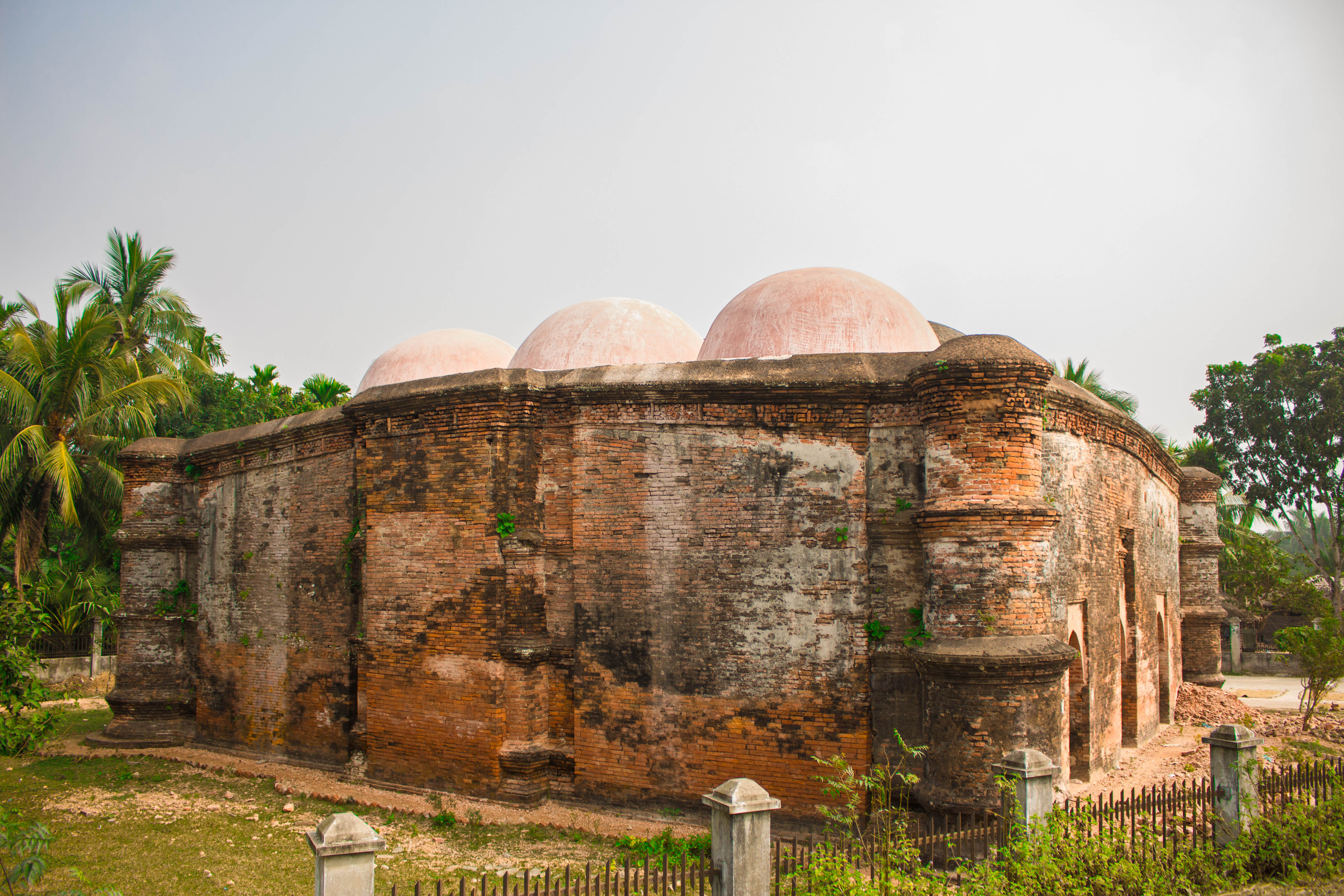
A back view of Masjidkur, an ancient mosque in Koyra discovered in the 20th century.

Koyra's history most likely dates as far back as the office of Khan Jahan Ali in the 15th century at least. This is evident from the ancient mosques found in Koyra such as Masjidkur.

The Channir Chak L.C. Collegiate School was established in 1935. In 1962, the Koyra Madinabad Secondary School was established.

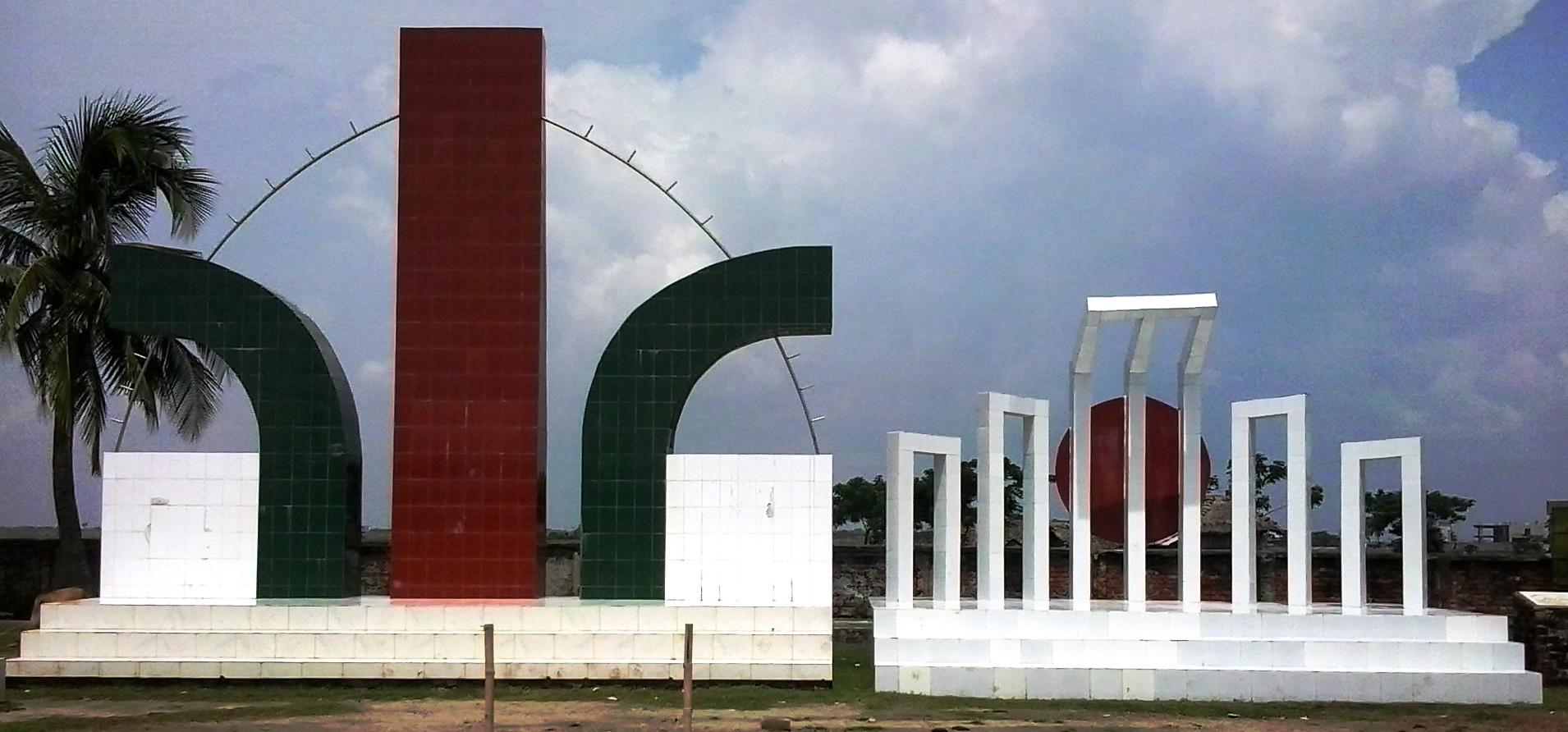
Monument and shahid minar, koyra

During the Bangladesh Liberation War of 1971, a sub-sector of Sector 9 was founded in Koyra's Amati Union known as Bachharbari-Manoranjan Camp, and so most of the Mukti Bahini's and Mujib Bahini's operations were launched from here. The Bengali freedom fighters built five camps in Koyra; World Poet Camp led by Abd al-Latif, Najmul Camp led by KM Mujibur Rahman, Nazrul Camp led by Abd al-Hakim, Narayan Camp led by Keramat Ali, Shaykh Abd al-Jalil and Shamsur Rahman in Jhileghata and the Suhrawardy Camp led by Rezaul Karim in Bamiya, Bagali Union. In Jaygirmahal, Dr Rafiqul Islam ran a secret medical centre to provide treatment to wounded freedom fighters. A mass grave was found in Launch Ghat, Marighata.

On 19 November 1979, Korya was established as a thana. It was upgraded to an upazila (sub-district) on 7 November 1983.

The Upazila suffered heavy damage following the Cyclone Sidr in 2007 and Cyclone Aila two years after that.

== Geography ==
Koyra is located at 22.3417°N 89.3000°E. It has 45,750 households and a total area 1775.40 km^{2}.

== Demographics ==
Religions in Koyra Upazila (2022)
Religion	Percent
Islam	82.00%
Hinduism	17.54%
Other or not stated	0.46%

According to the 2022 Bangladeshi census, Koyra Upazila had 55,518 households and a population of 220,102. 8.97% were under 5 years of age. Koyra had a literacy rate of 76.09%: 80.10% for males and 72.07% for females, and a sex ratio of 100.37 males per 100 females. 45,191 (20.53%) lived in urban areas.

The upazila is home to Bengali Muslims primarily as well a minority Bengali Hindu community and the other small ethnic groups such as the Mahato and the Munda people who reside in the Koyra Union and Uttar Bedkashi Union.

== Administration ==
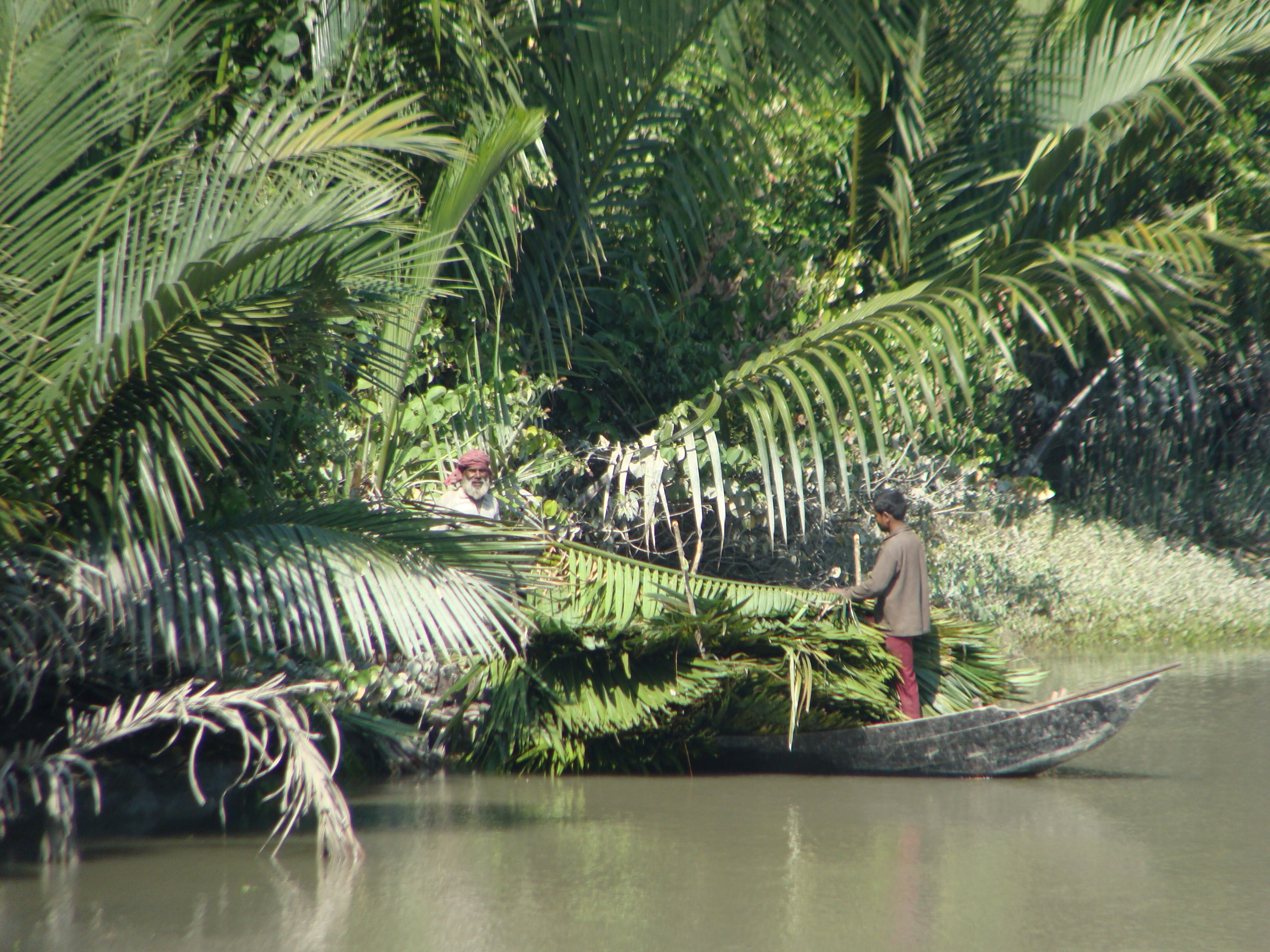
Man collecting mangrove palm in the Sundarbans in Koyra.

Koyra Thana was formed in 1980 and it was turned into an upazila in 1983.Koyra Upazila is divided into seven union parishads: Amadi, Bagali, Dakshin Bedkashi, Koyra, Moharajpur, Moheswaripur Union, and Uttar Bedkashi Union. The union parishads are subdivided into 71 mauzas and 133 villages.

== List of chairmen ==
List of chairmen
Name
Shamsuddin Ahmed
AKM Tamiz Uddin
GM Muhsin Reza
SM Shafiqul Islam

== Facilities ==
The upazila has three orphanages: Haji Rahim Orphanage, Qadi Kabir ad-Din Orphanage and Haji Qamar ad-Din Orphanage.

== Notable people ==
- Ruman Shana, Archer
- Shah Md. Ruhul Quddus, Politician
- Abul Kalam Azad, politician and former Member of Parliament.
- Animesh K. Gain, environmental scientist and academic.
- Ashraf Hossain, civil servant
- Mohibbullah, researcher and columnist

== See also ==
- Upazilas of Bangladesh
- Districts of Bangladesh
- Divisions of Bangladesh
