= Moheswaripur Union =

Moheswaripur Union মহেশ্বরীপুর ইউনিয়ন
- Union
- Location in Bangladesh
- Coordinates: 22.4562°N 89.3366°E
- Country: Bangladesh
- Division: Khulna Division
- District: Khulna District
- Upazila: Koyra Upazila

Government
  - Type: Union council
- Time zone: UTC+6 (BST)
- Website: moheswaripurup.khulna.gov.bd

Moheswaripur Union (Bengali: মহেশ্বরীপুর ইউনিয়ন) is a union parishad of Koyra Upazila of Khulna District, in Khulna Division, Bangladesh.
