= Soladana Union =

Soladana Union সোলাদানা ইউনিয়ন
- Union
- Location in Bangladesh
- Coordinates: 22.5250°N 89.3984°E
- Country: Bangladesh
- Division: Khulna Division
- District: Khulna District
- Upazila: Paikgachha Upazila

Government
  - Type: Union council
- Time zone: UTC+6 (BST)
- Website: soladanaup.khulna.gov.bd

Soladana Union (Bengali: সোলাদানা ইউনিয়ন) is a union parishad in Paikgachha Upazila of Khulna District, in Khulna Division, Bangladesh.
