= Gutudia Union =

Gutudia Union গুটুদিয়া ইউনিয়ন
- Union
- Location in Bangladesh
- Coordinates: 22.8008°N 89.4413°E
- Country: Bangladesh
- Division: Khulna Division
- District: Khulna District
- Upazila: Dumuria Upazila

Government
  - Type: Union council
- Time zone: UTC+6 (BST)
- Website: gutudiaup.khulna.gov.bd

Gutudia Union (Bengali: গুটুদিয়া ইউনিয়ন) is a union parishad in Dumuria Upazila of Khulna District, in Khulna Division, Bangladesh.
