= Jalma Union =

Jalma Union জলমা ইউনিয়ন
- Union
- Location in Bangladesh
- Coordinates: 22.7636°N 89.5258°E
- Country: Bangladesh
- Division: Khulna Division
- District: Khulna District
- Upazila: Batiaghata Upazila

Government
  - Type: Union council
- Time zone: UTC+6 (BST)
- Website: jolmaup.khulna.gov.bd

Jalma Union (Bengali: জলমা ইউনিয়ন) is a union parishad in Batiaghata Upazila of Khulna District, in Khulna Division, Bangladesh.
