= Naihati Union =

Place in Khulna Division, Bangladesh

Naihati Union নৈহাটি ইউনিয়ন
- Union
- Location in Bangladesh
- Coordinates: 22.7988°N 89.6126°E
- Country: Bangladesh
- Division: Khulna Division
- District: Khulna District
- Upazila: Rupsa Upazila

Government
  - Type: Union council
- Time zone: UTC+6 (BST)
- Website: noihatiup.khulna.gov.bd

Naihati Union (Bengali: নৈহাটি ইউনিয়ন) is a union parishad in Rupsa Upazila of Khulna District, in Khulna Division, Bangladesh.
