= Rangpur Union =

Rangpur Union রংপুর ইউনিয়ন
- Union
- Location in Bangladesh
- Coordinates: 22.8902°N 89.4618°E
- Country: Bangladesh
- Division: Khulna Division
- District: Khulna District
- Upazila: Dumuria Upazila

Government
  - Type: Union council
- Time zone: UTC+6 (BST)
- Website: rangpurup.khulna.gov.bd

Rangpur Union (Bengali: রংপুর ইউনিয়ন) is a union parishad in Dumuria Upazila of Khulna District, in Khulna Division, Bangladesh.

== Demography ==
Religion (2022)
Religion	Percent
Hinduism	82.03%
Islam	17.82%
Others	0.15%
