= Atalia Union =

Atalia Union আটলিয়া ইউনিয়ন
- Union
- Location in Bangladesh
- Coordinates: 22.8414°N 89.2988°E
- Country: Bangladesh
- Division: Khulna Division
- District: Khulna District
- Upazila: Dumuria Upazila

Government
  - Type: Union council
- Time zone: UTC+6 (BST)
- Website: ataliaup.khulna.gov.bd

Atalia Union (Bengali: আটলিয়া ইউনিয়ন) is a union parishad in Dumuria Upazila of Khulna District, in Khulna Division, Bangladesh.

== Demography ==
Religion (2022)
Religion	Percent
Islam	70.93%
Hinduism	28.57%
Others	0.5%
