= Garaikhali Union =

Garaikhali Union গড়ইখালী ইউনিয়ন
- Union
- Country: Bangladesh
- Division: Khulna Division
- District: Khulna District
- Upazila: Paikgachha Upazila

Government
  - Type: Union council
- Time zone: UTC+6 (BST)
- Website: goroikhaliup.khulna.gov.bd

Garaikhali Union (Bengali: গড়ইখালী ইউনিয়ন) is a union parishad in Paikgachha Upazila of Khulna District, in Khulna Division, Bangladesh.
