= Gangarampur Union =

Gangarampur Union গঙ্গারামপুর ইউনিয়ন
- Union
- Location in Bangladesh
- Coordinates: 23.2901°N 89.4376°E
- Country: Bangladesh
- Division: Khulna Division
- District: Khulna District
- Upazila: Batiaghata Upazila

Government
  - Type: Union council
- Time zone: UTC+6 (BST)
- Website: gongarampurup.khulna.gov.bd

Gangarampur Union (Bengali: গঙ্গারামপুর ইউনিয়ন) is a union parishad in Batiaghata Upazila of Khulna District, in Khulna Division, Bangladesh.

== Demography ==
Religion (2022)
Religion	Percent
Hinduism	68.36%
Islam	31.58%
Others	0.06%
