= Raghunathpur Union, Dumuria =

Raghunathpur Union রঘুনাথপুর ইউনিয়ন
- Union
- Location in Bangladesh
- Coordinates: 22.8671°N 89.4039°E
- Country: Bangladesh
- Division: Khulna Division
- District: Khulna District
- Upazila: Dumuria Upazila

Government
  - Type: Union council
- Time zone: UTC+6 (BST)
- Website: roghunathpurup.khulna.gov.bd

Raghunathpur Union (Bengali: রঘুনাথপুর ইউনিয়ন) is a union parishad in Dumuria Upazila of Khulna District, in Khulna Division, Bangladesh.

== Geography ==
=== Location ===
Raghunathpur is located at 22.8671°N 89.4039°E.
