= Dumuria Union =

Dumuria Union ডুমুরিয়া ইউনিয়ন
- Union
- Location in Bangladesh
- Coordinates: 22.8072°N 89.4177°E
- Country: Bangladesh
- Division: Khulna Division
- District: Khulna District
- Upazila: Dumuria Upazila

Government
  - Type: Union council
- Time zone: UTC+6 (BST)
- Website: dumuriaup.khulna.gov.bd

Dumuria Union (Bengali: ডুমুরিয়া ইউনিয়ন) is a union parishad in Dumuria Upazila of Khulna District, in Khulna Division, Bangladesh.
