= Bhandarkot Union =

Bhandarkot Union ভান্ডারকোট ইউনিয়ন
- Union
- Location in Bangladesh
- Coordinates: 22.6876°N 89.5688°E
- Country: Bangladesh
- Division: Khulna Division
- District: Khulna District
- Upazila: Batiaghata Upazila

Government
  - Type: Union council
- Time zone: UTC+6 (BST)
- Website: vandarkotup.khulna.gov.bd

Bhandarkot Union (Bengali: ভান্ডারকোট ইউনিয়ন) is a union parishad in Batiaghata Upazila of Khulna District, in Khulna Division, Bangladesh.
