= Kajibacha River =

River in Bangladesh

Coordinates: 22.6938°N 89.5336°E

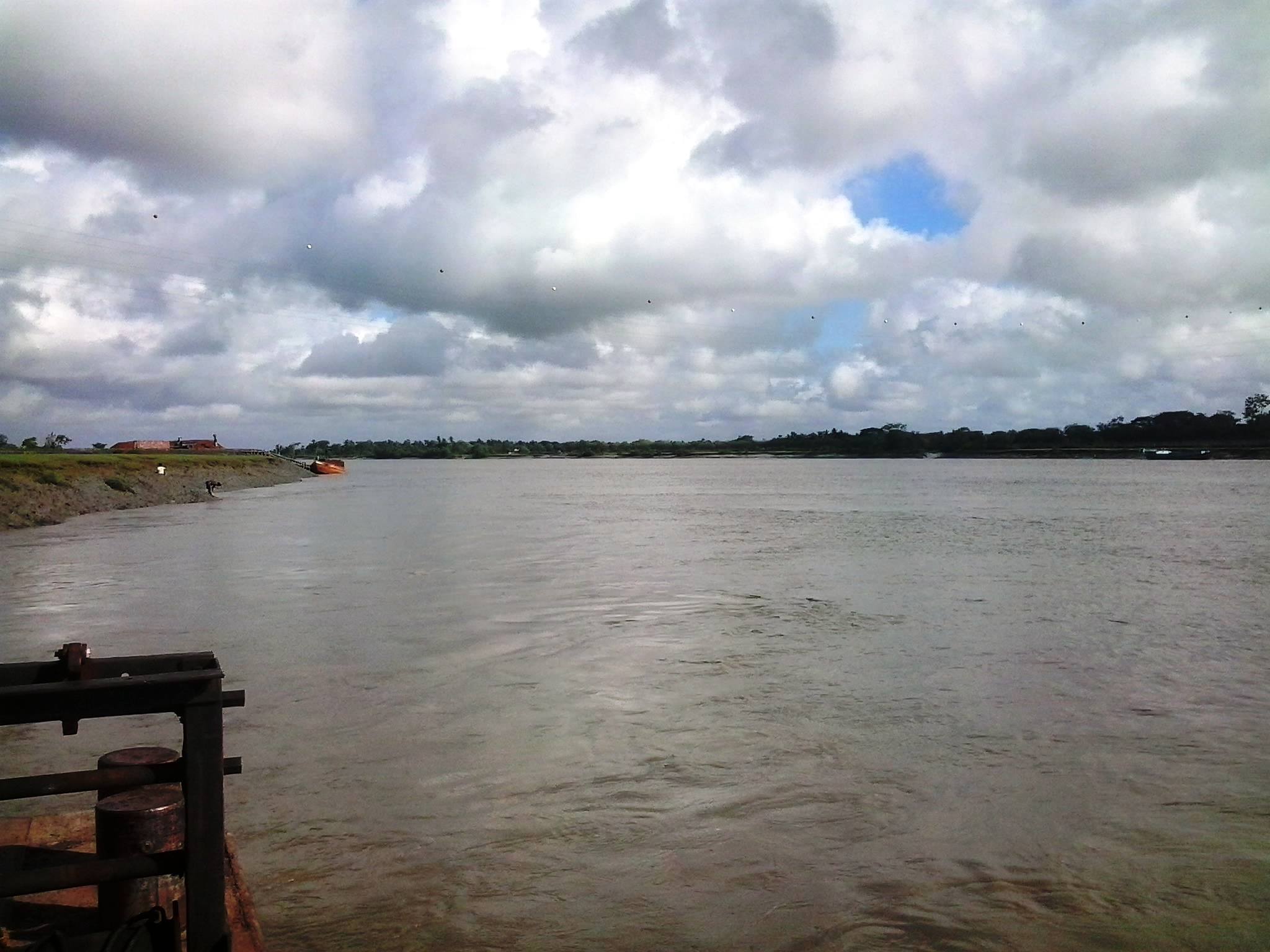

The Kajibacha River (Bengali: কাজীবাছা নদী) is a river located in Batiaghata Upazila of Khulna District, Bangladesh.

== Location ==
This river connects the Rupsha River with the Pasur River. The Kajibacha River divides Batiaghata Upazila into two parts.
