= Batiaghata Union =

Batiaghata Union বটিয়াঘাটা ইউনিয়ন
- Union
- Location in Bangladesh
- Coordinates: 22.7370°N 89.5142°E
- Country: Bangladesh
- Division: Khulna Division
- District: Khulna District
- Upazila: Batiaghata Upazila

Government
  - Type: Union council
- Time zone: UTC+6 (BST)
- Website: botiaghataup.khulna.gov.bd

Batiaghata Union (Bengali: বটিয়াঘাটা ইউনিয়ন) is a union parishad in Batiaghata Upazila of Khulna District, in Khulna Division, Bangladesh.

== Demography ==
Religion (2022)
| Religion | Percent |
| Hinduism | 79.38% |
| Islam | 20.56% |
| Others | 0.06% |
