= Phultala Union =

Phultala Union ফুলতলা ইউনিয়ন
- Location of Phultala Union in Bangladesh
- Coordinates: 22.9851°N 89.4454°E
- Country: Bangladesh
- Division: Khulna Division
- District: Khulna District
- Upazila: Phultala Upazila

Government
  - Type: Union Council
- Time zone: UTC+6 (BST)
- Website: fultolaup.khulna.gov.bd

Phultala Union (Bengali: ফুলতলা ইউনিয়ন) is a union parishad of Phultala Upazila in the District and Division of Khulna, Bangladesh.
