= Chandkhali Union =

Chandkhali Union চাঁদখালী ইউনিয়ন
- Union
- Location in Bangladesh
- Coordinates: 22.5353°N 89.2501°E
- Country: Bangladesh
- Division: Khulna Division
- District: Khulna District
- Upazila: Paikgachha Upazila

Government
  - Type: Union council
- Time zone: UTC+6 (BST)
- Website: chandkhaliup.khulna.gov.bd

Chandkhali Union (Bengali: চাঁদখালী ইউনিয়ন) is a union parishad in Paikgachha Upazila of Khulna District, in Khulna Division, Bangladesh.
