= Kapilmuni Union =

Kapilmuni Union কপিলমুনি ইউনিয়ন
- Union
- Location in Bangladesh
- Coordinates: 22°41′8″N 89°18′39″E
- Country: Bangladesh
- Division: Khulna Division
- District: Khulna District
- Upazila: Paikgachha Upazila

Government
  - Type: Union council
- Time zone: UTC+6 (BST)
- Website: kopilmuniup.khulna.gov.bd

Kapilmuni Union (Bengali: কপিলমুনি ইউনিয়ন) is a union parishad in Paikgachha Upazila of Khulna District, in Khulna Division, Bangladesh. In 2022, archaeological excavation in Rezakpur village of Kapilmuni Union revealed ruins of ancient human settlement dating back to approximately the 9th century.
