= Koyra Madinabad Model Secondary School =

Location
- Koyra Upazila; Khulna, 9290; Bangladesh
- Coordinates: 22.3468609°N 89.2900391°E

Information
- Type: Educational Institution
- Established: 1962
- School board: Board of Intermediate and Secondary Education, Jessore
- School district: Khulna
- Grades: 6th to 12th
- Gender: Boys, girls
- Language: Bengali
- Sports: Cricket, Football, Volleyball

Koyra Madinabad Model Secondary School is a secondary schools of the southern part of Khulna district under Koyra Upazila of Khulna District in Bangladesh. The institute was established in the middle of the 19th century. The school was upgraded into a model through governmentalization and the education system was introduced from class sixth to twelfth. Out of which the technical curriculum has been included.

== History ==
The school was established at Koyra Sadar on 1962. After a long time progress, the government was formalized as a Govt. and model school on 7 October 2018.

== Co-education activities ==
- The scout team
- Debate competition
- Science Club
- Sports club
- The assembly
