= Atra Gilatala Union =

- Atra Gilatala Union
- Location of Atra Gilatala Union in Bangladesh
- Coordinates: 22.9146°N 89.5029°E
- Country: Bangladesh
- Division: Khulna Division
- District: Khulna District
- Upazila: Phultala Upazila

Government
  - Type: Union Council
  - Secretary: Suraya Parveen

Area
  - Total: 19.540000 km^{2} (7.5444362 sq mi)

Population (according to 2010 Voter list)
  - Total: 61,345
  - Density: 3,139.5/km^{2} (8,131.2/sq mi)
- Time zone: UTC+6 (BST)
- Postal code: 9204
- Website: www.atragilatolaup.khulna.gov.bd

Atra Gilatala Union is a Union Council of Phultala Upazila .

== Location and Area ==
Atra Gilatla Union is located in Phultala Upazila of Khulna District. It is located south of Phultala upazila. Atra Gilatala Union is bounded by Damodar UP on the North, Bhairav River on the East, Ward No. 1 of Khulna City Corporation and Yogipol Union Parishad on the South and Bill Dakatiya on the West. The area of this union is 19.54 square kilometers. The total land area is 4830.48 hectares.

== Chairman And UP Secretary ==
Chairman	
UP Secretary	Suraya Parveen

== Population And Voter ==
According to the 2010 voter list (allegedly double that number now):

Population			Voter		
Male	Female	Total	Male	Female	Total
31191	30154	61345	16591	15486	32077

== Village ==
There are total eight villages in Atra Atra Gilatala Union, the villages are picturesque.

No	Village Name
1	Pariyardanga
2	Moshiali
3	Gabtola
4	Atra
5	Mattamdanga
6	Gilatala
7	Shiromoni
8	Dakatiya

== Market ==
Total number of market: 6

No	Market Name
1	Pother Bazar
2	Easterngate Market
3	Afil Gate Market
4	Garrison Bazar
5	Gilatala market
6	Shiromani Bazar

== Canals and Rivers ==
Bhairav River flows in Atra Atra Gilatala Union. Even though it is only one river, it is of great benefit to the people here, such as the fishermen community catching fish in the river. Boats ply the river and launch, steamers and cargo ships ply for communication. There are many canals in various villages of the Union which benefit the people of the area in various ways. People catch fish in canals, drain water from here and irrigate land. It is very useful for harvesting. All the canals in this union are:

- Nona Canal
- Balia Canal
- Soyaler Canal

== Tourist Spot ==
Atra Gilatala Union has many scenic spots. Among which Khulna's largest Jahanabad Cantonment Banovilas Zoo, largest Jahanabad Cantonment Shishu Park is one of them, Police Firing Range, BNCC Camp. There is also Bhairav River, Bypass Road and Bill-Dakatiya.

== Educational Institutions ==
=== College ===
- Cantonment Public College
- Khanjahan Ali Adarsh College
- Metro Technical and BM College

=== High School ===
- Gilatala Secondary School
- Cantonment Public Secondary School
- Atra Srinath Secondary School
- Shiromani Secondary School
- Mashiali Secondary School
- Alim Eastern Secondary School
- Atara Secondary Girls School

=== Madrasa ===
- Mashiali Darul Uloom Dakhil Madrasa
- Shiromani Alim Madrasa
- Gilatala Ahmadia Dakhil Madrasa
- Shiromani Hafizia Madrasa
- Atra Shamsul Uloom Qaumi Madrasa
- Gilatala Sheikhpara Ba. Fa. Hafizia Madrasa
- Gilatala Mohammadia Hafizia Madrasa

== Hospital ==
- Union Health and Family Welfare Center.
- BNSB Eye Hospital.
- Linda Clinic.
- The Great Hospital.
- K.K hospital and Diagnostics.
