= Uttar Bedkashi Union =

Uttar Bedkashi Union উত্তর বেদকাশী ইউনিয়ন
- Union
- Location in Bangladesh
- Coordinates: 22.3034°N 89.3072°E
- Country: Bangladesh
- Division: Khulna Division
- District: Khulna District
- Upazila: Koyra Upazila

Government
  - Type: Union council
- Time zone: UTC+6 (BST)
- Postal code: 9290
- Website: northbedkashiup.khulna.gov.bd

Uttar Bedkashi Union (Bengali: উত্তর বেদকাশী ইউনিয়ন) is a union parishad of Koyra Upazila of Khulna District, in Khulna Division, Bangladesh.

== Geography ==
Uttar Bedkashi Union has an area of 5,544 acres (2,244 ha). It is the smallest union of Koyra Upazila.

== Administrative area ==
Uttar Bedkashi union consists of a mouza / village. The mouza is divided into 9 administrative wards.

The villages are:

- Ward no. 1 – Kathmarchar, Jalalipara
- Ward no. 2 – Dighirpar, Pathaghata Shikaripara, Kacharibari
- Ward no. 3 – Sheikh Sardar Para, Nonadighirpar
- Ward no. 4 – Borobari, Katkata, Kashikhalpar
- Ward no. 5 – Pathorkhali,
- Ward no. 6 – Jhileghata
- Ward no. 7 – Gazipara
- Ward no. 8 – Shakbaria, Gabbunia
- Ward no. 9 – Padmapukur

Again, there are elected women representatives (female members of the council) in every three wards. They are reporting the elected representatives (chairman of the council). The council also has one recruited secretary, village police.

== Population ==
According to the latest census, the total population of Gunner union was 15,225.

=== Rivers ===
- Kapotaksha River
- Shakbaria River

== Education ==
- Bedkashi Collegiate School
- Bedkashi Habibia Dakhil Madrasa
- Kapotakshma Secondary School
- Borobari Secondary School
- Borobari Government Primary School
- Bedkashi Government Primary School

== Economics ==
The economy of Uttar Bedkashi Union is largely dependent on agriculture and fisheries.
