= Lata Union =

Lata Union লতা ইউনিয়ন
- Union
- Location in Bangladesh
- Coordinates: 22.6463°N 89.3653°E
- Country: Bangladesh
- Division: Khulna Division
- District: Khulna District
- Upazila: Paikgachha Upazila

Government
  - Type: Union council
- Time zone: UTC+6 (BST)
- Website: lotaup.khulna.gov.bd

Lata Union (Bengali: লতা ইউনিয়ন) is a union parishad in Paikgachha Upazila of Khulna District, in Khulna Division, Bangladesh.

== Demography ==
Religion (2022)
Religion	Percent
Hinduism	72.87%
Islam	27.12%
Others	0.01%
