= Aranghata Union =

Aranghata Union আড়ংঘাটা ইউনিয়ন
- Union
- Location in Bangladesh
- Coordinates: 22.8722°N 89.5032°E
- Country: Bangladesh
- Division: Khulna Division
- District: Khulna District
- Upazila: Dighalia Upazila

Government
  - Type: Union council
- Time zone: UTC+6 (BST)
- Website: aronghataup.khulna.gov.bd

Aranghata Union (Bengali: আড়ংঘাটা ইউনিয়ন) is a union parishad in Dighalia Upazila of Khulna District, in Khulna Division, Bangladesh.
