= Damodar Union, Phultala =

Coordinates: 22.973°N 89.475°E

Damodor Union ফুলতলা ইউনিয়ন
- Location of Damodor Union in Bangladesh
- Country: Bangladesh
- Division: Khulna Division
- District: Khulna District
- Upazila: Phultala Upazila

Government
  - Type: Union Council
- Time zone: UTC+6 (BST)
- Website: www.damodarup.khulna.gov.bd

Damodar Union (Bengali: দামোদর ইউনিয়ন) is a union parishad, the smallest rural administrative division of Phultala Upazila in the south-western District and Division of Khulna, Bangladesh. It has 9 wards. The present Union Chairman is Sarif Muhammad Bhuiyan.

At a glance of Damodor Union:

Location: It has situated at the adjacent of Phultala Upazila along with the eastern side of Upper Jeshore Road.

Jurisdiction of the Union: 01 no. Atra Gilatola union is situated at the southern part of the union, 04 no. Phultala union is situated at the Northern part, Bhariab River is Eastern part, and Dakatiya Bill is at the Western part of this union.

Damoder is very much valuable in Khulna Division specially for politics, mills and factories. During the liberation war of 1971 it was a safe zone protected by local freedom fighters.

The Military Collegiate School (MCSK), Damoder M.M. Secondary School (DMSS), Phultala Re-Union High School, BPGD Union High School, Phultala MM College, Phultala Women's College, and Phultala Govt. Girls School are famous educational institutions here.

The Bhairab River crosses through this area. There are 4 hospitals (2 govt, 2 non govt.), 23 primary schools (16 govt, 7 non govt.)
