= Bagali Union =

Bagali Union বাগালী ইউনিয়ন
- Union
- Location in Bangladesh
- Coordinates: 22.4439°N 89.2790°E
- Country: Bangladesh
- Division: Khulna Division
- District: Khulna District
- Upazila: Koyra Upazila

Government
  - Type: Union council
- Time zone: UTC+6 (BST)
- Website: bagaliup.khulna.gov.bd

Bagali Union (Bengali: বাগালী ইউনিয়ন) is a union parishad of Koyra Upazila of Khulna District, in Khulna Division, Bangladesh.
