= Raruli Union =

Raruli Union রাড়ুলী ইউনিয়ন
- Union
- Location in Bangladesh
- Coordinates: 22.6284°N 89.2656°E
- Country: Bangladesh
- Division: Khulna Division
- District: Khulna District
- Upazila: Paikgachha Upazila

Government
  - Type: Union council

Population (2011)
  - Total: 26,152
- Time zone: UTC+6 (BST)
- Website: raruliup.khulna.gov.bd

Raruli Union (Bengali: রাড়ুলী ইউনিয়ন) is a union parishad in Paikgachha Upazila of Khulna District, in Khulna Division, Bangladesh.
