= Deluti Union =

Deluti Union দেলুটি ইউনিয়ন
- Union
- Location in Bangladesh
- Coordinates: 22.6414°N 89.4212°E
- Country: Bangladesh
- Division: Khulna Division
- District: Khulna District
- Upazila: Paikgachha Upazila

Government
  - Type: Union council
- Time zone: UTC+6 (BST)
- Website: delutiup.khulna.gov.bd

Deluti Union (Bengali: দেলুটি ইউনিয়ন) is a union parishad in Paikgachha Upazila of Khulna District, in Khulna Division, Bangladesh.

== Demography ==
Religion (2022)
Religion	Percent
Hinduism	69.22%
Islam	30.88%
Others	0.00%
