= Jamira Union =

Jamira Union জামিরা ইউনিয়ন
- Location of Jamira Union in Bangladesh
- Coordinates: 22.9347°N 89.3993°E
- Country: Bangladesh
- Division: Khulna Division
- District: Khulna District
- Upazila: Phultala Upazila

Government
  - Type: Union Council
- Time zone: UTC+6 (BST)
- Website: www.jamiraup.khulna.gov.bd

Jamira Union (Bengali: জামিরা ইউনিয়ন) is a union parishad of Phultala Upazila in the District and Division of Khulna, Bangladesh.
