= Amadi Union =

Amadi Union আমাদি ইউনিয়ন
- Union
- Location in Bangladesh
- Coordinates: 22.4923°N 89.2799°E
- Country: Bangladesh
- Division: Khulna Division
- District: Khulna District
- Upazila: Koyra Upazila

Government
  - Type: Union council
- Time zone: UTC+6 (BST)
- Website: amadiup.khulna.gov.bd

Amadi Union (Bengali: আমাদি ইউনিয়ন) is a union parishad of Koyra Upazila of Khulna District, in Khulna Division, Bangladesh.

== Geography ==
Chandakhali union is bounded on the north by Amadi union, Koyra river on the south, Maheshwarpur union on the east and Kaptakhms river on the west.

=== River ===
Koyra River on the southern border of Amadi union, Kapotakhma River to the west and Shivasa River to the east.

== Wards ==
There are 3 wards in the Amadi Union.

- Jagir mahal
- Amadi
- Ballyadanga
- Vanderpool
- Patnikhali
- Channirchalk
- Harinagar
- Mosjidkur
- Nakasa
