= Surkhali Union =

Surkhali Union সুরখালী ইউনিয়ন
- Union
- Location in Bangladesh
- Coordinates: 22.6647°N 89.4383°E
- Country: Bangladesh
- Division: Khulna Division
- District: Khulna District
- Upazila: Batiaghata Upazila

Government
  - Type: Union council
- Time zone: UTC+6 (BST)
- Website: surkhaliup.khulna.gov.bd

Surkhali Union (Bengali: সুরখালী ইউনিয়ন) is a union parishad in Batiaghata Upazila of Khulna District, in Khulna Division, Bangladesh.
