= Baliadanga Union =

Baliadanga Union বালিয়াডাঙ্গা ইউনিয়ন
- Union
- Location in Bangladesh
- Coordinates: 22.7202°N 89.5584°E
- Country: Bangladesh
- Division: Khulna Division
- District: Khulna District
- Upazila: Batiaghata Upazila

Government
  - Type: Union council
- Time zone: UTC+6 (BST)
- Website: baliadangaup.khulna.gov.bd

Baliadanga Union (Bengali: বালিয়াডাঙ্গা ইউনিয়ন) is a union parishad in Batiaghata Upazila of Khulna District, in Khulna Division, Bangladesh.
