= Gazirhat Union =

Gazirhat Union গাজীরহাট ইউনিয়ন
- Union
- Location in Bangladesh
- Coordinates: 22.9248°N 89.5787°E
- Country: Bangladesh
- Division: Khulna Division
- District: Khulna District
- Upazila: Dighalia Upazila

Government
  - Type: Union council
- Time zone: UTC+6 (BST)
- Website: gajirhatup.khulna.gov.bd

Gazirhat Union (Bengali: গাজীরহাট ইউনিয়ন) is a union parishad in Dighalia Upazila of Khulna District, in Khulna Division, Bangladesh.
