= Dhamaliya Union =

Dhamaliya Union ধামালিয়া ইউনিয়ন
- Union
- Location in Bangladesh
- Coordinates: 22.8968°N 89.3712°E
- Country: Bangladesh
- Division: Khulna Division
- District: Khulna District
- Upazila: Dumuria Upazila

Government
  - Type: Union council
- Time zone: UTC+6 (BST)
- Website: dhamaliaup.khulna.gov.bd

Dhamaliya Union (Bengali: ধামালিয়া ইউনিয়ন) is a union parishad in Dumuria Upazila of Khulna District, in Khulna Division, Bangladesh.

== Demography ==
Religion (2022)
Religion	Percent
Islam	81.83%
Hinduism	18.16%
Others	0.01%
