= Barakpur Union =

Barakpur Union বারাকপুর ইউনিয়ন
- Union
- Location in Bangladesh
- Coordinates: 22.9190°N 89.5283°E
- Country: Bangladesh
- Division: Khulna Division
- District: Khulna District
- Upazila: Dighalia Upazila

Government
  - Type: Union council
- Time zone: UTC+6 (BST)
- Website: barakpurup.khulna.gov.bd

Barakpur Union (Bengali: বারাকপুর ইউনিয়ন) is a union parishad in Dighalia Upazila of Khulna District, in Khulna Division, Bangladesh.
