= Senhati Union =

Place in Khulna Division, Bangladesh

Senhati Union সেনহাটি ইউনিয়ন
- Union
- Location in Bangladesh
- Coordinates: 22.8694°N 89.5517°E
- Country: Bangladesh
- Division: Khulna Division
- District: Khulna District
- Upazila: Dighalia Upazila

Government
  - Type: Union council
- Time zone: UTC+6 (BST)
- Website: senhatiup.khulna.gov.bd

Senhati Union (Bengali: সেনহাটি ইউনিয়ন) is a union parishad in Dighalia Upazila of Khulna District, in Khulna Division, Bangladesh.
