= Sharafpur Union =

Sharafpur Union শরাফপুর ইউনিয়ন
- Union
- Location in Bangladesh
- Coordinates: 22.7036°N 89.4366°E
- Country: Bangladesh
- Division: Khulna Division
- District: Khulna District
- Upazila: Dumuria Upazila

Government
  - Type: Union council
- Time zone: UTC+6 (BST)
- Website: shorafpurup.khulna.gov.bd

Sharafpur Union (Bengali: শরাফপুর ইউনিয়ন) is a union parishad in Dumuria Upazila of Khulna District, in Khulna Division, Bangladesh.
