= Dighalia Union, Khulna =

Place in Khulna Division, Bangladesh

Dighalia Union দিঘ লিয়া ইউনিয়ন
- Union
- Location in Bangladesh
- Coordinates: 22.8886°N 89.5345°E
- Country: Bangladesh
- Division: Khulna Division
- District: Khulna District
- Upazila: Dighalia Upazila

Government
  - Type: Union council
- Time zone: UTC+6 (BST)
- Website: digholiaup.khulna.gov.bd

Dighalia Union (Bengali: দিঘলিয়া ইউনিয়ন) is a union parishad in Dighalia Upazila of Khulna District, in Khulna Division, Bangladesh.
