= Kharnia Union =

Kharnia Union খর্ণিয়া ইউনিয়ন
- Union
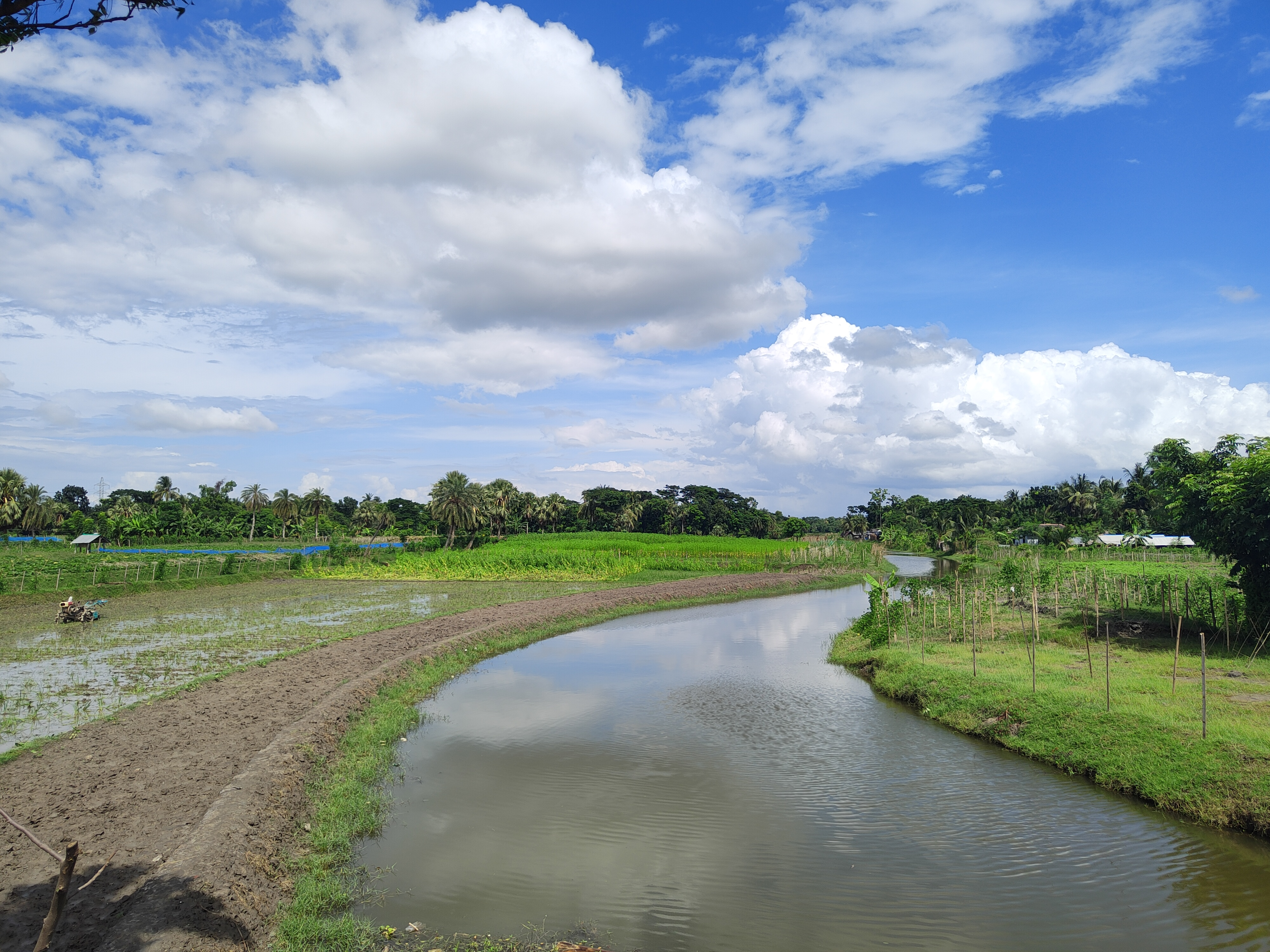
- Country: Bangladesh
- Division: Khulna Division
- District: Khulna District
- Upazila: Dumuria Upazila

Government
  - Type: Union council
- Time zone: UTC+6 (BST)
- Website: kharniaup.khulna.gov.bd

Kharnia Union (Bengali: খর্ণিয়া ইউনিয়ন) is a union parishad in Dumuria Upazila of Khulna District, in Khulna Division, Bangladesh.
