= Haridhali Union =

Haridhali Union হরিঢালী ইউনিয়ন
- Union
- Country: Bangladesh
- Division: Khulna Division
- District: Khulna District
- Upazila: Paikgachha Upazila

Government
  - Type: Union council
- Time zone: UTC+6 (BST)
- Website: horindhaliup.khulna.gov.bd

Haridhali Union (Bengali: হরিঢালী ইউনিয়ন) is a union parishad in Paikgachha Upazila of Khulna District, in Khulna Division, Bangladesh.

== Geography ==
It shares borders with Tala upazila and Kapilmuni union on the north, Lata union on the east and Jalarpur union of Tala upazila in Satkhira district on the west and Gadaipur union on the south.
