= Sahos Union =

Sahos Union সাহস ইউনিয়ন
- Union
- Location in Bangladesh
- Coordinates: 22.7559°N 89.4153°E
- Country: Bangladesh
- Division: Khulna Division
- District: Khulna District
- Upazila: Dumuria Upazila

Government
  - Type: Union council
- Time zone: UTC+6 (BST)
- Website: sahosup.khulna.gov.bd

Sahos Union (Bengali: সাহস ইউনিয়ন) is a union parishad in Dumuria Upazila of Khulna District, in Khulna Division, Bangladesh.
