= Shovna Union =

Shovna Union শোভনা ইউনিয়ন
- Union
- Location in Bangladesh
- Coordinates: 22.7936°N 89.3715°E
- Country: Bangladesh
- Division: Khulna Division
- District: Khulna District
- Upazila: Dumuria Upazila

Government
  - Type: Union council
- Time zone: UTC+6 (BST)
- Website: shovonaup.khulna.gov.bd

Shovna Union (Bengali: শোভনা ইউনিয়ন) is a union parishad in Dumuria Upazila of Khulna District, in Khulna Division, Bangladesh.
