= Lashkar Union =

Lashkar Union লস্কর ইউনিয়ন
- Union
- Location in Bangladesh
- Coordinates: 22.5537°N 89.3057°E
- Country: Bangladesh
- Division: Khulna Division
- District: Khulna District
- Upazila: Paikgachha Upazila

Government
  - Type: Union council
- Time zone: UTC+6 (BST)
- Website: loskorup.khulna.gov.bd

Lashkar Union (Bengali: লস্কর ইউনিয়ন) is a union parishad in Paikgachha Upazila of Khulna District, in Khulna Division, Bangladesh.
