= Magurkhali Union =

Magurkhali Union মাগুরখালী ইউনিয়ন
- Union
- Location in Bangladesh
- Coordinates: 22.7025°N 89.3687°E
- Country: Bangladesh
- Division: Khulna Division
- District: Khulna District
- Upazila: Dumuria Upazila

Government
  - Type: Union council
- Time zone: UTC+6 (BST)
- Website: magurkhaliup.khulna.gov.bd

Magurkhali Union (Bengali: মাগুরখালী ইউনিয়ন) is a union parishad in Dumuria Upazila of Khulna District, in Khulna Division, Bangladesh.

== Demography ==
Religion (2022)
Religion	Percent
Hinduism	88.50%
Islam	11.47%
Others	0.03%
