= Moharajpur Union =

Moharajpur Union মহারাজপুর ইউনিয়ন
- Union
- Location in Bangladesh
- Coordinates: 22.3848°N 89.2818°E
- Country: Bangladesh
- Division: Khulna Division
- District: Khulna District
- Upazila: Koyra Upazila

Government
  - Type: Union council
- Time zone: UTC+6 (BST)
- Website: moharajpurup.khulna.gov.bd

Moharajpur Union (Bengali: মহারাজপুর ইউনিয়ন) is a union parishad of Koyra Upazila of Khulna District, in Khulna Division, Bangladesh.
