= Batiaghata Upazila =

Batiaghata বটিয়াঘাটা
- Upazila
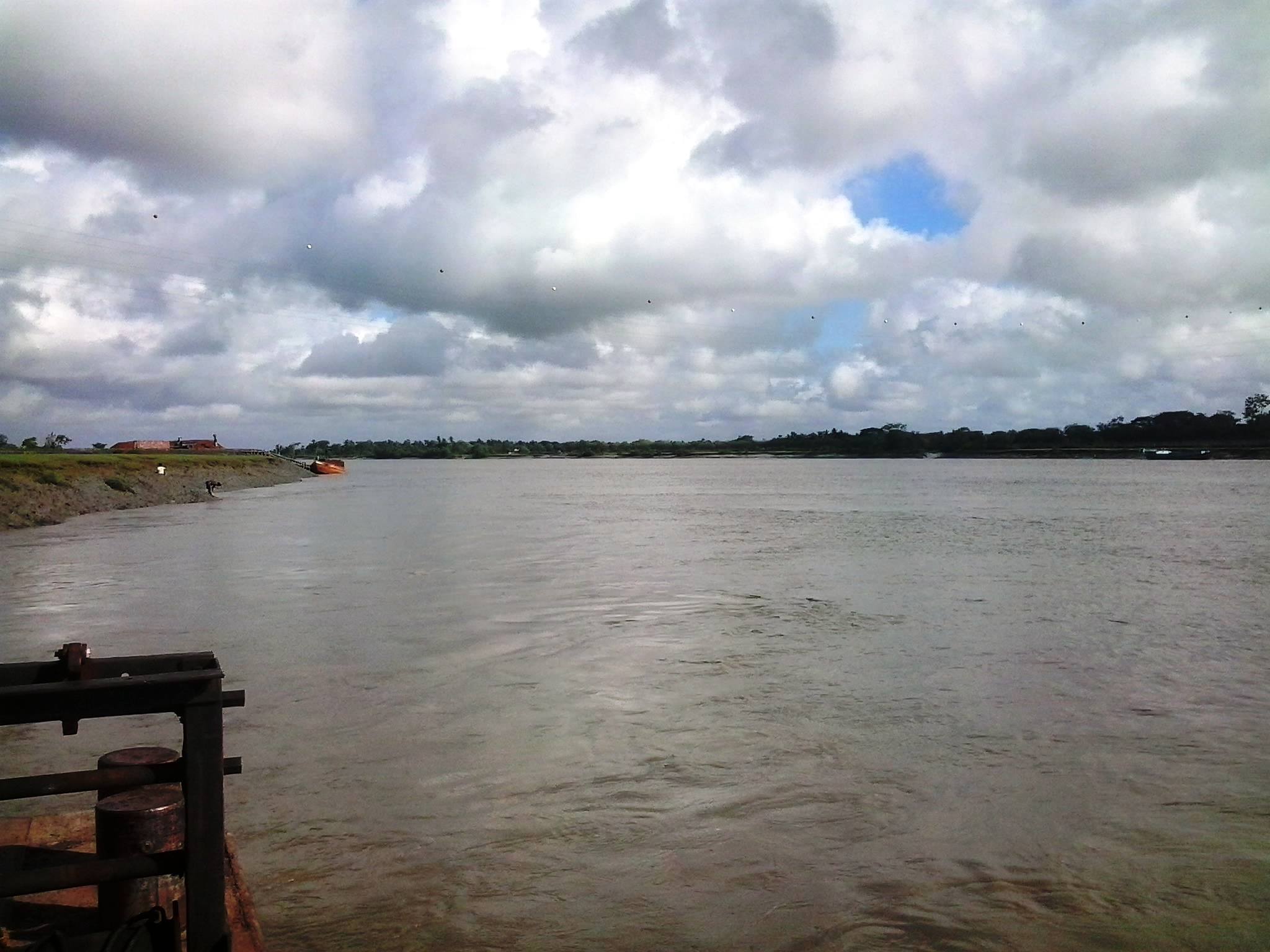
- Kajibacha River

- Coordinates: 22°44.5′N 89°31′E
- Country: Bangladesh
- Division: Khulna
- District: Khulna

Area
  - Total: 248.31 km^{2} (95.87 sq mi)

Population (2022)
  - Total: 233,540
  - Density: 940.52/km^{2} (2,435.9/sq mi)
- Time zone: UTC+6 (BST)
- Postal code: 9260
- Website: Official Map of Batiaghata

Batiaghata (Bengali: বটিয়াঘাটা) is an upazila of Khulna District in the division of Khulna, Bangladesh.

== Geography ==
Batiaghata is located at 22.7417°N 89.5167°E. The Kajibacha River divides it into an eastern and a western part. It has a total area of 248.31 km^{2}.

== Demographics ==
According to the 2022 Bangladeshi census, Batiaghata Upazila had 59,277 households and a population of 233,041. 8.29% were under 5 years of age. Batiaghata had a literacy rate of 80.45%: 82.82% for males and 78.06% for females, and a sex ratio of 101.56 males per 100 females. 20,199 (8.67%) lived in urban areas.

Religions in Batiaghata Upazila (2022)
Religion	Percent
Islam	72.28%
Hinduism	27.56%
Other or not stated	0.16%

Population by religion in Union
Union	Muslim	Hindu	Others
Amirpur Union	17,327	2,039	1
Baliadanga Union	18,518	758	1
Batiaghata Union	4,436	17,128	14
Bhandarkot Union	14,933	3,743	1
Gangarampur Union	5,985	12,958	11
Jalma Union	88,528	18,961	333
Surkhali Union	18,701	8,639	6

🟩 Muslim majority 🟧 Hindu majority

As of the 2011 Census of Bangladesh, Batiaghata upazila had 40,779 households and a population of 171,691. 32,365 (18.85%) were under 10 years of age. Batiaghata had an average literacy rate of 54.90%, compared to the national average of 51.8%, and a sex ratio of 981 females per 1000 males. 7,675 (4.47%) of the population lived in urban areas.

According to the 1991 Bangladesh census, Batiaghata had a population of 128,184. Males constituted 51.07% of the population, and females 48.93%. The population aged 18 or over is 71,463. Batiaghata has an average literacy rate of 37.7% (7+ years), compared to the national average of 32.4%.

== Points of interest ==
- Baroaria Bazar
- Baintala Bazaar
- Pagol r Mandir
- Prem Kanon
- Batiaghata Bridge
- Gopalkhali Park
- Kazibacha River
- Batiaghata Bazaar
- Guptamari Gram
- Premkanon Family Picnic Corner
- Tamim Telecom Hatbati
- Shialidanga Bazar

== Administration ==
Batiaghata Upazila is divided into seven union parishads: Amirpur, Baliadanga, Batiaghata, Bhandarkot, Gangarampur, Jalma, and Surkhali. The union parishads are subdivided into 127 mauzas and 172 villages.

== Education ==
=== Secondary schools ===
- B.L.G. High school
- Batiaghata High School
- Batiaghata Thana Headquarters Girls High School
- Batiaghata Thana Headquarters Pilot Model Secondary School
- Bayarbhanga Biswambhara High school
- Gaoghara High School
- Jolma Chokrakhali Secondary School
- Khalshibunia G.P.B. High School
- Kharabad Baintala High School
- Rashmohan Girls High School, Bayarbhanga
- Shialidanga secondary school

=== Colleges ===
- Batiaghata Degree College
- Gariardanga Adarsha College
- Khagendranath Girls College
- Kharabad Baintala School & College

== Nearest tourist points ==
- Shat Gombuj Mosque
- Sundarban
- Mongla Port
- Khulna City
- Shitala Bari Temple
- Chandramohol
- Local Riverine Scenery
- Rana Resort & Amusement Park

== See also ==
- Upazilas of Bangladesh
- Districts of Bangladesh
- Divisions of Bangladesh
- Jalma Union
