= Dumuria Upazila =

Dumuria ডুমুরিয়া
- Upazila
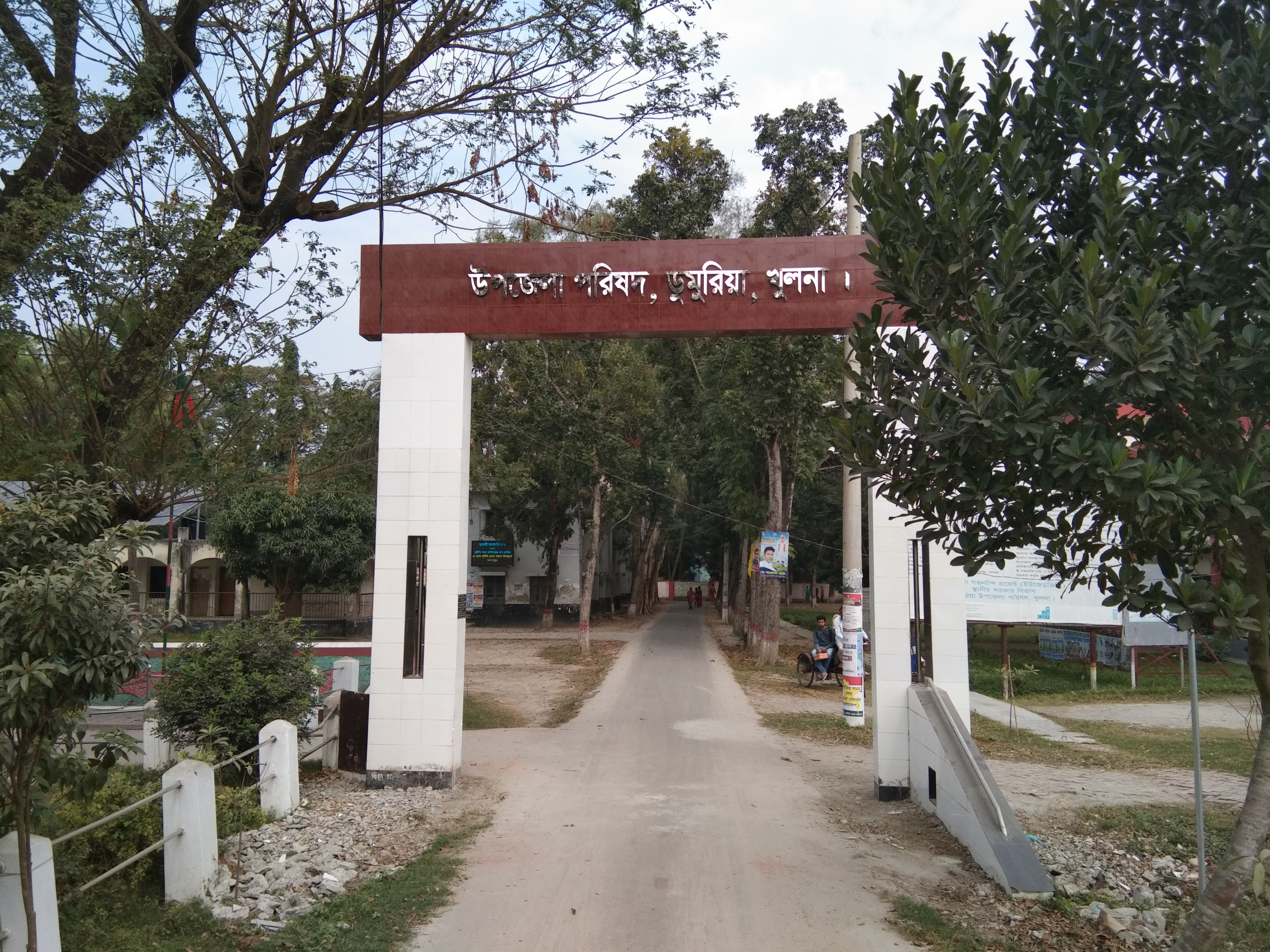
- Dumuria Upazila Parishad

- Coordinates: 22°48.5′N 89°25.5′E
- Country: Bangladesh
- Division: Khulna
- District: Khulna

Area
  - Total: 454.23 km^{2} (175.38 sq mi)

Population (2022)
  - Total: 343,899
  - Density: 757.10/km^{2} (1,960.9/sq mi)
- Time zone: UTC+6 (BST)
- Postal code: 9250
- Website: Official Map of Dumuria

Dumuria Upazila mauza geocode map

Dumuria (Bengali: ডুমুরিয়া) is an upazila of Khulna District in the division of Khulna, Bangladesh.

== Etymology ==
Dumuria is named for the presence of Dumur, the Bengali word for Wild Fig.

== History ==
Ancient Monuments and Antiquities Chenchuri Nilkuthi, Chuknagar Nilkuthi, Madhugram Dak Bungalow.

Historical facts In 1948, the Tevaga movement took place in Sobna, Dhanibunia, Kanaidanga, Orabunia and Bakultala villages of the upazila. During the Liberation War, many Bengalis including Prafulla Kumar Biswas, Indubhushan, Lalchand, Amulya, Mahendra, Raicharan, Nihar and Ratan were martyred in the attack of Pak Army in Kalitalapara in April 1971. In addition, 14 soldiers of the allied forces were killed in the face-off between the liberation forces and the allied forces in Shalua Bazar. Chuknagar village was used as a transit point by the Bengali refugees going to India who were suffering from the atrocities of the Pakistan Army in the early days of the Liberation War. On 20 May 1971, a large number of refugees gathered in Chuknagar were indiscriminately killed by Pak forces. Every year this day is observed as 'Chuknagar Massacre Day'.

== Geography ==
Dumuria is located at 22.8083°N 89.4250°E. It has a total area of 454.23 square kilometres (175.38 sq mi). There are two major rivers, Shipsha and Shangrail.

== Demographics ==
According to the 2022 Bangladeshi census, Dumuria Upazila had 87,953 households and a population of 343,899. 7.72% were under 5 years of age. Dumuria had a literacy rate of 75.97%: 79.87% for males and 72.10% for females, and a sex ratio of 99.55 males per 100 females. 38,845 (11.30%) lived in urban areas.

Religions in Dumuria Upazila (2022)
Religion	Percent
Islam	65.13%
Hinduism	34.72%
Other or not stated	0.15%

Population by religion in Union
Union	Muslim	Hindu	Others
Atalia Union	25,661	10,336	180
Bhandarpara Union	8,385	10,142	11
Dhamaliya Union	19,378	4,291	3
Dumuria Union	24,638	7,673	36
Gutudia Union	22,442	15,423	26
Kharnia Union	18,351	4,276	17
Maguraghona Union	23,690	2,414	153
Magurkhali Union	1571	12,123	4
Raghunathpur Union	15,885	10,698	18
Rangpur Union	3,393	15,614	28
Rudaghara Union	18,742	6,596	7
Sahos Union	17,280	3,534	7
Sharafpur Union	13,109	5,191	4
Shovna Union	11,459	11,088	8

🟩 Muslim majority 🟧 Hindu majority

As of the 2011 Census of Bangladesh, Dumuria upazila had 71,909 households and a population of 305,675. 58,123 (19.01%) were under 10 years of age. Dumuria had an average literacy rate of 52.58%, compared to the national average of 51.8%, and a sex ratio of 996 females per 1000 males. 19,828 (6.49%) of the population lived in urban areas.

According to the 1991 Bangladesh census, Dumuria had a population of 256,503. Males constituted 51.12% of the population, and females 48.88%. The population aged 18 or over was around 138,764. Dumuria had an average literacy rate of 36.1% (7+ years), compared to the national average of 32.4% .

== Administration ==
Dumuria Upazila is divided into 14 union parishads: Atlia, Dhamalia, Dumuria, Ghutudia, Khornia, Magurkhali, Maguraghona, Raghunathpur, Rangpur, Rudaghora, Sahos, Shorafpur, Shovna, and Vandarpara. The union parishads are subdivided into 189 mauzas and 240 villages.

== Notable residents ==
- Gazi family of Chuknagar, Dumuria
  - Gazi Shamsur Rahman (1921–1998), lawyer, writer, translator, columnist and television personality
  - Gazi Ainun Nishat (born 1948), water resource and climate change specialist
- Haldar Mohammad Abdul Gaffar (1936–2020), lieutenant general
- Khan Tipu Sultan (1950–2017), politician
- Narayan Chandra Chanda, MP (Khulna-5), Minister of Ministry of Fisheries And Livestock of Bangladesh

== See also ==
- Upazilas of Bangladesh
- Districts of Bangladesh
- Divisions of Bangladesh
