= Terokhada Upazila =

Terokhada তেরখাদা
- Upazila
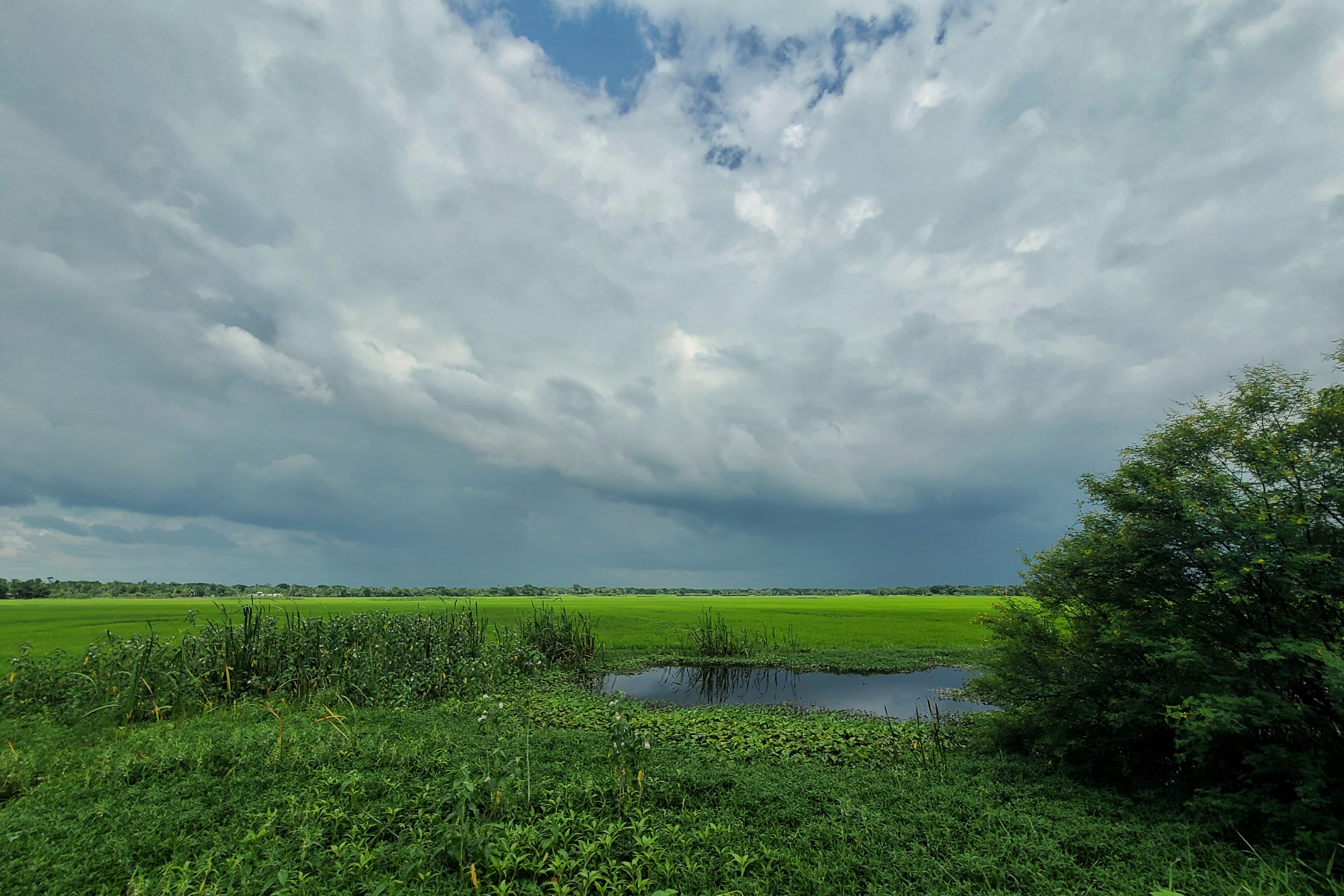
- Fields in Terokhada Upazila

- Coordinates: 22°56.5′N 89°40.2′E
- Country: Bangladesh
- Division: Khulna
- District: Khulna

Area
  - Total: 189.49 km^{2} (73.16 sq mi)

Population (2022)
  - Total: 128,925
  - Density: 680.38/km^{2} (1,762.2/sq mi)
- Time zone: UTC+6 (BST)
- Postal code: 9230
- Website: terokhada.khulna.gov.bd

Terokhada Upazila mauza geocode map

Terokhada (Bengali: তেরখাদা) is an upazila in Khulna District, Khulna, Bangladesh.

== Geography ==
Terokhada is located at 22.9417°N 89.6694°E. It has 26,304 households and a total area of 189.49 km^{2}.

== Demographics ==
Religions in Terokhada Upazila (2022)
Religion	Percent
Islam	83.76%
Hinduism	16.23%
Other or not stated	0.01%

According to the 2022 Bangladeshi census, Terokhada Upazila had 32,375 households and a population of 128,925. 10.64% were under 5 years of age. Terokhada had a literacy rate of 73.19%: 73.54% for males and 72.85% for females, and a sex ratio of 97.74 males per 100 females. 17,133 (13.29%) lived in urban areas.

As of the 2011 Census of Bangladesh, Terokhada upazila had 26,340 households and a population of 116,709. 29,745 (25.49%) were under 10 years of age. Terokhada had an average literacy rate of 48.46%, compared to the national average of 51.8%, and a sex ratio of 1000 females per 1000 males. 11,977 (10.26%) of the population lived in urban areas.

At the time of the 2001 census, Terokhada has a population of 110,628. Males constitute 51.01% of the population, and females 48.99%. Around 637 people lives per km in this Upazilla. Terokhada has an average literacy rate of 65% (7+ years).

== Administration ==
Terokhada Upazila is divided into six union parishads: Ajgora, Barasat, Chagladoho, Modhupur, Sachiadaho, and Terokhada. The union parishads are subdivided into 33 mauzas and 100 villages.

== See also ==
- Upazilas of Bangladesh
- Districts of Bangladesh
- Divisions of Bangladesh
