= Rupsa Upazila =

Rupsa রূপসা
- Upazila
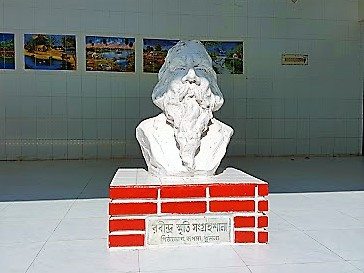
- Bust of Rabindranath Tagore in Pithavoge Rabindra Memorial Complex, Rupsa, Khulna

- Coordinates: 22°50′N 89°35′E
- Country: Bangladesh
- Division: Khulna
- District: Khulna

Area
  - Total: 120.15 km^{2} (46.39 sq mi)

Population (2022)
  - Total: 206,748
  - Density: 1,720.7/km^{2} (4,456.7/sq mi)
- Time zone: UTC+6 (BST)
- Postal code: 9240
- Area code: 04020
- Website: Official Map of Rupsa

Rupsa Upazila mauza geocode map

Rupsa (Bengali: রূপসা) is an upazila of Khulna District in the Division of Khulna, Bangladesh.

== Geography ==
Rupsa is located at 22.8333°N 89.5833°E. It has 41,895 households and total area 120.15 km^{2}.

== Demographics ==
Religions in Rupsa Upazila (2022)
Religion	Percent
Islam	86.60%
Hinduism	13.24%
Other or not stated	0.16%

According to the 2022 Bangladeshi census, Rupsa Upazila had 52,457 households and a population of 206,748. 9.00% were under 5 years of age. Rupsa had a literacy rate of 80.04%: 81.65% for males and 78.44% for females, with a sex ratio of 99.68 males per 100 females. 38,159 (18.45%) lived in urban areas.

As of the 2011 Census of Bangladesh, Rupsa upazila had 41,895 households and a population of 179,519. 35,583 (19.82%) were under 10 years of age. Rupsa had an average literacy rate of 58.23%, compared to the national average of 51.8%, and a sex ratio of 990 females per 1000 males. The entire population was rural.

According to the 1991 Bangladesh census, Rupsa had a population of 150,185. Males constituted 51.98% of the population and females 48.02%. The population aged 18 or over was 77,918. Rupsa had an average literacy rate of 40.4% (7+ years), compared to the national average of 32.4%.

== Administration ==
Rupsa Upazila is divided into five union parishads: Aichgati, Ghatvog, Noihati, Srifoltola, and T. S. Bahirdia. The union parishads are subdivided into 64 mauzas and 78 villages.

== See also ==
- Upazilas of Bangladesh
- Districts of Bangladesh
- Divisions of Bangladesh
