= Third Mujib ministry =

Bangladeshi Government after the first post-independence elections

- 3rd Council of Ministers of the People's Republic of Bangladesh
- 16 March 1973–25 January 1975
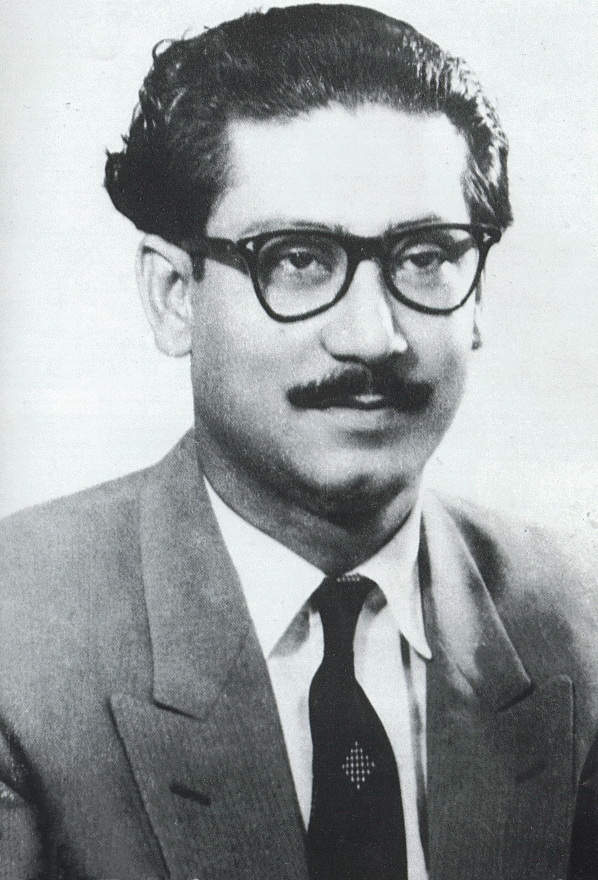
- Prime Minister Sheikh Mujibur Rahman
- Date formed: 16 March 1973
- Date dissolved: 25 January 1975

People and organisations
- President: Abu Sayeed Chowdhury; Mohammad Mohammadullah (acting until 1974)
- Prime Minister: Sheikh Mujibur Rahman
- Member party: Bangladesh Awami League
- Status in legislature: Dominant-party majority
- Opposition party: -

History
- Election: 1973
- Outgoing election: -
- Legislature terms: 1st Jatiya Sangsad
- Predecessor: Mujib II
- Successor: Mujib IV

The third Mujib ministry was formed on 16 March 1973 after the Bangladesh Awami League won the first general election of sovereign and independent Bangladesh with a vast majority.

== Cabinet ==
The cabinet was composed of the following ministers:

Portfolio	Minister	Took office	Left office	Party	Ref
Prime Minister	Sheikh Mujibur Rahman	16 March 1973	24 January 1975	AL	
Minister of Agriculture	Abdus Samad Azad	16 March 1973	24 January 1975	AL	
Minister of Commerce	Khondaker Mostaq Ahmad	16 March 1973	24 January 1975	AL	
Minister of Communications	Muhammad Mansur Ali	16 March 1973	24 January 1975	AL	
Minister of Defence	Sheikh Mujibur Rahman	16 March 1973	24 January 1975	AL	
Minister of Education	M. Yousuf Ali	16 March 1973	24 January 1975	AL	
Minister of Finance	vacant	16 March 1973	24 January 1975		
Minister of Food and Civil Supplies	Abdul Momin	16 March 1973	24 January 1975		
Minister of Foreign Affairs	Kamal Hossain	16 March 1973	24 January 1975	AL	
Minister of Foreign Trade	A. H. M. Qamaruzzaman	16 March 1973	date unknown	AL	(Note: Otherwise included with Minister of Commerce)
Minister of Forests, Fisheries, and Livestock	Abdur Rab Serniabat	16 March 1973	date unknown	AL	
Minister of Forests, Fisheries, and Livestock	Mollah Jalaluddin Ahmad	6 December 1973	date unknown	AL	
Minister of Forests, Fisheries, and Livestock	Sheikh Mujibur Rahman		date unknown	AL	
Minister of Forests, Fisheries, and Livestock	Tajuddin Ahmad		date unknown	AL	
Minister of Forests, Fisheries, and Livestock	vacant		24 January 1975		
Minister of Health and Family Planning	Abdul Mannan	16 March 1973	24 January 1975	AL	
Minister of Home Affairs	Abdul Malek Ukil	16 March 1973	date unknown	AL	
Minister of Home Affairs	Mansur Ali		24 January 1975	AL	
Minister of Industries	A. H. M. Qamaruzzaman	16 March 1973	date unknown	AL	
Minister of Industries	Syed Nazrul Islam		24 January 1975	AL	
Minister of Information and Broadcasting	Sheikh Abdul Aziz	16 March 1973	4 October 1973	AL	
Minister of Information and Broadcasting	Sheikh Mujibur Rahman	4 October 1973	24 January 1975	AL	
Minister of Jute	Tajuddin Ahmad	16 March 1973	date unknown	AL	
Minister of Jute	Shamsul Haq	6 December 1973	8 July 1974	AL	
Minister of Jute	Sheikh Mujibur Rahman	9 July 1974	24 January 1975	AL	
Minister of Labor and Social Welfare	Abdul Mannan	16 March 1973	24 January 1975	AL	
Minister of Land Revenue	Mollah Jalaluddin Ahmad	16 March 1973	8 July 1974	AL	(Note: After March 1974, Minister of Land Administration and Land Reform)
Minister of Land Revenue	Phani Bhushan Majumder		24 January 1975	AL	
Minister of Law and Parliamentary Affairs	Manoranjan Dhar	16 March 1973	24 January 1975	AL	
Minister of Local Government, Rural Development, and Cooperatives	Matiur Rahman	16 March 1973	8 July 1974		
Minister of Local Government, Rural Development, and Cooperatives	Abdus Samad Azad		24 January 1975	AL	
Minister of Planning	Vacant	16 March 1973	24 January 1975		
Minister of Posts, Telephones, and Telegraph	M. A. G. Osmani	16 March 1973	date unknown	AL	
Minister of Posts, Telephones, and Telegraph	Sheikh Abdul Aziz	4 October 1973	8 July 1974	AL	
Minister of Posts, Telephones, and Telegraph	Mansur Ali		24 January 1975	AL	
Minister of Power, Natural Resources; Scientific and Technological Research and Atomic Energy	Hafiz Ahmad Choudhury	16 March 1973	8 July 1974		(Note: Title varied, "Power" was dropped in March 1974)
Minister of Power, Natural Resources; Scientific and Technological Research and Atomic Energy	Kamal Hossain		24 January 1975	AL	
Minister of Power, Flood Control and Irrigation	Abdur Rab Serniabat	16 March 1973	24 January 1975	AL	
Minister of Public Works and Housing	Muhammad Sohrab Hossain	16 March 1973	24 January 1975		
Minister of Relief and Rehabilitation	Mizanur Rahman Chowdhury	16 March 1973	May 1973	AL	
Minister of Relief and Rehabilitation	Sheikh Mujibur Rahman	4 October 1973	date unknown	AL	
Minister of Relief and Rehabilitation	Abdul Momin		24 January 1975		
Minister of Shipping, Inland Waterways and Water Transport	M. A. G. Osmani	16 March 1973	8 July 1974	AL	
Minister of Shipping, Inland Waterways and Water Transport	Sheikh Mujibur Rahman	9 July 1974	24 January 1975	AL	
