= Second Mujib ministry =

1972 government of independent Bangladesh

- 2nd Council of Ministers of the People's Republic of Bangladesh
- 12 January 1972–16 March 1973
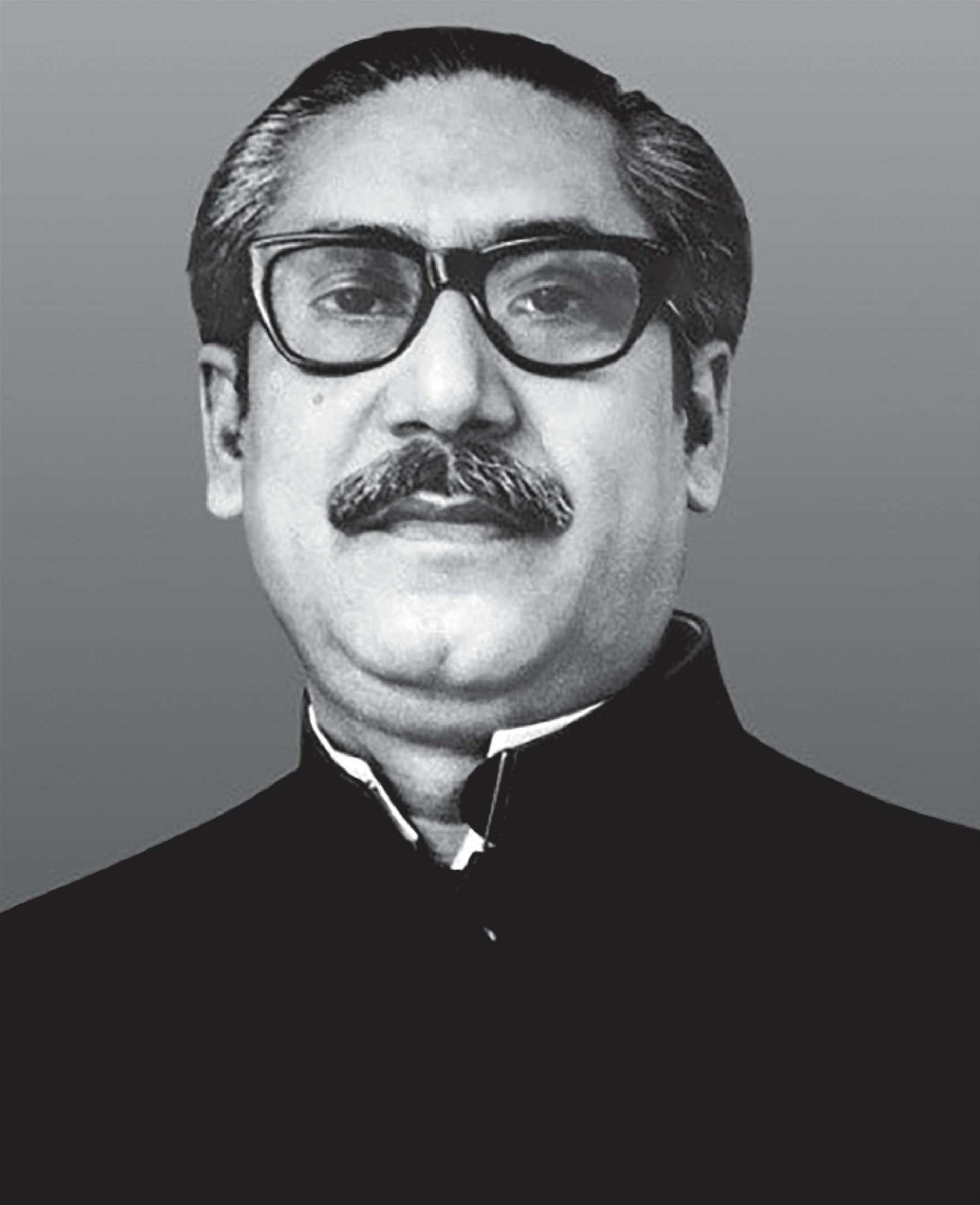
- Prime Minister Sheikh Mujibur Rahman
- Date formed: 12 January 1972
- Date dissolved: 16 March 1973

People and organisations
- President: Abu Sayeed Chowdhury
- Prime Minister: Sheikh Mujibur Rahman
- Member party: Bangladesh Awami League
- Status in legislature: Dominant-party majority
- Opposition parties: National Awami Party (Wali); Independent

History
- Election: 1970 elections in East Pakistan
- Outgoing election: 1973
- Legislature terms: Constituent Assembly; 1st Jatiya Sangsad
- Predecessor: Provisional
- Successor: Mujib III

The second Mujib ministry was the first government of sovereign and independent Bangladesh. After independence, on 12 January 1972, Sheikh Mujibur Rahman assumed office as the second Prime Minister of Bangladesh and left office on 16 March 1973.

== Cabinet ==
The cabinet was composed of the following ministers:

Portfolio	Minister	Took office	Left office	Party	Ref
Prime Minister	Sheikh Mujibur Rahman	12 January 1972	16 March 1973	AL	
Minister of Agriculture	Phani Bhushan Majumder	29 December 1971	12 January 1972	AL	
Minister of Agriculture	Sheikh Abdul Aziz	13 January 1972	16 March 1973	AL	
Minister of Commerce	Mansur Ali	12 January 1972	date unknown	AL	
Minister of Commerce	Syed Nazrul Islam		16 March 1973	AL	
Minister of Communications	Sheikh Abdul Aziz	12 January 1972	16 March 1973	AL	
Minister of Defence	Sheikh Mujibur Rahman	12 January 1972	16 March 1973	AL	
Minister of Education	M. Yousuf Ali	12 January 1972	16 March 1973	AL	
Minister of Finance	Tajuddin Ahmad	12 January 1972	16 March 1973	AL	
Minister of Food and Civil Supplies	Phani Bhushan Majumder	12 January 1972	16 March 1973	AL	
Minister of Foreign Affairs	Abdus Samad Azad	12 January 1972	16 March 1973	AL	
Minister of Forests, Fisheries, and Livestock	Muhammad Sohrab Hossain		16 March 1973		
Minister of Health and Family Planning	Zahur Ahmad Chowdhury	12 January 1972	date unknown	AL	
Minister of Health and Family Planning	Abdul Malek Ukil		16 March 1973	AL	
Minister of Home Affairs	Sheikh Mujibur Rahman	12 January 1972	date unknown	AL	
Minister of Home Affairs	Abdul Mannan		16 March 1973	AL	
Minister of Industries	Syed Nazrul Islam	12 January 1972	20 January 1972	AL	
Minister of Industries	Mustafizur Rahman Siddiqi	20 January 1972	16 March 1973	AL	
Minister of Information and Broadcasting	Sheikh Mujibur Rahman	12 January 1972	date unknown	AL	
Minister of Information and Broadcasting	Mizanur Rahman Chowdhury		16 March 1973	AL	
Minister of Labor and Social Welfare	Zahur Ahmad Chowdhury	12 January 1972	16 March 1973	AL	
Minister of Land Revenue	Khondaker Mostaq Ahmad	12 January 1972	date unknown	AL	
Minister of Land Revenue	Abdur Rab Serniabat		16 March 1973	AL	
Minister of Law and Parliamentary Affairs	Kamal Hossain	12 January 1972	16 March 1973	AL	
Minister of Local Government, Rural Development, and Cooperatives	Phani Bhushan Majumder	12 January 1972	date unknown	AL	
Minister of Local Government, Rural Development, and Cooperatives	Sheikh Abdul Aziz		date unknown	AL	
Minister of Local Government, Rural Development, and Cooperatives	Shamsul Haq	20 January 1972	16 March 1973		
Minister of Planning	Tajuddin Ahmad	12 January 1972	16 March 1973	AL	
Minister of Posts, Telephones, and Telegraph	Mollah Jalaluddin Ahmad		16 March 1973	AL	
Minister of Power, Natural Resources; Scientific and Technological Research and Atomic Energy	Hafiz Ahmad Choudhury		16 March 1973		(Note: Title varied, "Power" was dropped in March 1974)
Minister of Power, Flood Control and Irrigation	Khondaker Mostaq Ahmad	12 January 1972	16 March 1973	AL	(Note: Title varied)
Minister of Public Works and Housing	Muhammad Yusuf Ali	12 January 1972	date unknown	AL	
Minister of Public Works and Housing	Kamal Hossain		date unknown	AL	
Minister of Public Works and Housing	Matiur Rahman	20 January 1972	16 March 1973		
Minister of Relief and Rehabilitation	A. H. M. Qamaruzzaman	12 January 1972	16 March 1973	AL	
Minister of Shipping, Inland waterwaysand Water Transport	M. A. G. Osmani	12 April 1972	16 March 1973	AL	
