= Jute genome =

A group of researchers in Bangladesh successfully completed draft genome sequencing for the jute plant.

The consortium consisted of Dhaka University, Bangladesh Jute Research Institute, and software company DataSoft Systems Bangladesh Ltd. It worked in collaboration with Centre for Chemical Biology, University of Science Malaysia, and University of Hawaii at Manoa.

On June 16, 2010, Bangladeshi prime minister Sheikh Hasina disclosed in the parliament that Bangladeshi researchers had successfully completed the draft genome sequencing, which was anticipated to contribute to improvements in jute fiber production.

== History ==
It all began in February 2008, when Maqsudul Alam approached Professor Ahmad Shamsul Islam, Coordinator of GNOBB (Global Network of Bangladeshi Biotechnologists), regarding the possibility of sequencing the jute genome. The Bangladeshi scientific community, which was already exploring the idea of sequencing the jute genome, responded positively to this offer, initiating the process.

The endeavor started with many long conference calls between Dr. Alam and plant molecular biologists, Professors Haseena Khan and Zeba Islam Seraj of the Department of Biochemistry and Molecular Biology, University of Dhaka. They established connections with the University of Hawaii and the University of Science Malaysia for technical support, and prepared a project proposal to secure funding from various institutions.

Initially, there were many assurances, but the reality proved different. In the early stages, the Genome Research Center USA and the University of Science Malaysia provided some technical support to collect research data on jute from around the world. As the volume of data grew, a supercomputer became necessary for analysis. There was still a pressing need for funding to support field research.

The "Swapnajatra" team became frustrated due to the lack of proper support, and it became difficult to keep the team members engaged. In 2009, The Daily Prothom Alo published an article about the research that changed everything. Agriculture Minister Matia Chowdhury introduced Dr. Maqsudul Alam to Prime Minister Sheikh Hasina and assured him of further support. Thus, the team "Swapnajatra" regained their confidence and continued their work.

== Resources ==
Genomic DNA (gDNA) from Tossa Jute (Corchorus olitorius O-4) was used for high-throughput Next Generation Sequencing (NGS) platforms, including 454 GS FLX, Illumina/Solexa, and SOLiD. More than 50X coverage (over 100 billions of A, C, G, and Ts) of Jute genome-sequencing data were used for the draft assembly. Several open-source and commercial genome assembly and annotation pipelines were used to assemble and analyze the raw data. To validate the draft genome, transcriptome analysis was also carried out. For data analysis, different computational resources, ranging from a high-performance Cluster Server to Dell servers to Silicon Graphics SGI Altix-350 and 450, were used.

== See also ==
- Genome project
- Structural genomics
