= Mujib Cabinet =

Mujib Cabinet is the name of any of four cabinets of the Republic of Bangladesh:

- Cabinet Mujib I also known as Provisional Government of Bangladesh or Mujibnagar Government (1971–1972)
- Cabinet Mujib II (1972–1973)
- Cabinet Mujib III (1973–1975)
- Cabinet Mujib IV also known as BaKSHAL Government (1975)

== See also ==
- Sheikh Mujibur Rahman
