= Toufiq M. Seraj =

Bangladeshi businessman (1956–2019)

- Born: 1 July 1956; Pabna, East Pakistan, Pakistan
- Died: 20 June 2019 (aged 62); Qatar
- Other name: Julian
- Education: Bangladesh University of Engineering and Technology; University of Liverpool
- Occupations: Businessman, engineer
- Spouse: Zeba Islam Seraj

Toufiq M. Seraj (1 July 1956 – 20 June 2019) was a Bangladeshi businessman who was the founder and managing director of Sheltech and its associated companies. He was the first president of Real Estate and Housing Association of Bangladesh (REHAB) for three consecutive terms (2000–2006). Seraj was also a president of Bangladesh Institute of Planners (2006-8) and Bangladesh Tennis Federation.

== Early life and education ==
Seraj was born in 1956. He completed graduation and post-graduation from Bangladesh University of Engineering and Technology. Later he earned his PhD in civic design from the University of Liverpool.

== Career ==
Seraj taught at Bangladesh University of Engineering and Technology. He was president of the Bangladesh Institute of Planners. He was the founding managing director of Sheltech, and founding president of REHAB. He was the president of Bangladesh Tennis Federation.

== Personal life ==
Seraj was married to Zeba Islam Seraj, a professor at the Department of Biochemistry and Molecular Biology, University of Dhaka. They have two daughters, Saamiya and Sarah Seraj.

== Death ==
Seraj died on 20 June 2019, aged 62, of a massive heart attack in the aeroplane lavatory whilst en route from Dhaka to Barcelona, Spain, with a stopover in Doha. His body was flown back to Dhaka from Doha Airport.
