= Sheikh Abdul Aziz (Bangladeshi politician) =

Bangladeshi politician (1929–2019)

- শেখ আবদুল আজিজ
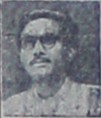

Minister of Information and Broadcasting
- In office 16 March 1973 – 4 October 1973
- Preceded by: Mizanur Rahman Chowdhury
- Succeeded by: Sheikh Mujibur Rahman

Minister of Agriculture
- In office 13 January 1972 – 16 March 1973
- Preceded by: Phani Bhushan Majumder
- Succeeded by: Abdus Samad Azad

Minister of Road Transport and Bridges
- In office 29 December 1971 – 12 January 1972
- Preceded by: Muhammad Mansur Ali
- Succeeded by: Muhammad Mansur Ali

Member of the Bangladesh Parliament for Khulna-4
- In office 7 March 1973 – 6 November 1974
- Preceded by: Position Established
- Succeeded by: Abdul Latif Khan

Personal details
- Born: 27 February 1929 Morrelganj Upazila, Bagerhat District, Bengal Presidency, British India
- Died: 8 April 2019 (aged 90) Dhaka, Bangladesh
- Party: Bangladesh Awami League
- Spouse: Shaukat Ara Aziz
- Children: 3

Sheikh Abdul Aziz (27 February 1929 – 8 April 2019) was a Bangladesh Awami League politician and the minister of information from April 1973 to September 1973.

== Early life and education ==
Aziz was born on 27 February 1929 in Teligati, Morelganj Upazila, Bagerhat District, East Bengal, British India. He studied at Government P.C. College, Bagerhat. In 1947, he completed his B.A. in history at Calcutta University. He obtained his M.A. degree in political science in 1951 from Dhaka University. Later he pursued a law degree from Dhaka University and practiced law at Dhaka High Court .

== Career ==
=== Early Political Career ===
Aziz began student politics while studying at Government P.C. College, Bagerhat, in 1942. He actively took part in the Pakistan Movement and the Anti-British Movement. He was an active worker for the All India Muslim Students Federation. He started his political career mainly in Bagerhat District. He actively took part in the All-India Muslim League campaign for the 1946 Indian Constituent Assembly election and the 1946 Indian provincial elections.

=== Formation of Awami League and onwards ===
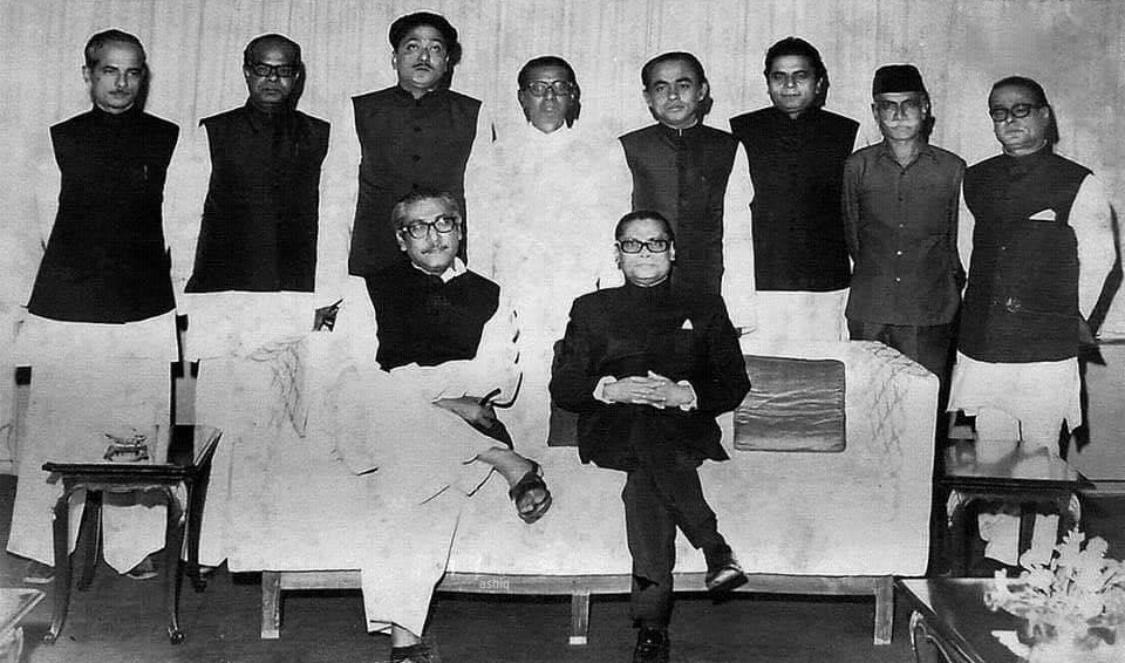
From left to right: Standing: Abdur Rab Serniabat, Abdul Malek Ukil, Mizanur Rahman Chowdhury, Muhammad Sohrab Hossain, Sheikh Abdul Aziz, Abdul Mannan, General M.A.G. Osmani, and Shamsul Haq; Sitting: Prime Minister Bangabandhu Sheikh Mujibur Rahman and President Abu Sayeed Chowdhury

Aziz was a founding member of Awami League and a close associate of President Sheikh Mujibur Rahman. He was the founding president of the Khulna District Awami League. He held the position for 25 years, from 1949 to 1974. He retired from politics fully thereafter. He was a key leader of the Mujibnagar government during the Bangladesh Liberation War and worked as a liaison officer. He was the minister of communication, agriculture, and post and telecommunication in the first cabinet of Bangladesh. He was imprisoned after the assassination of Sheikh Mujibur Rahman and retired from politics after release from prison.

== Books ==
- রাজনীতির সেকাল ও একাল

== Personal life ==
He was married to Shaukat Ara Aziz. The couple had a son and two daughters.

== Death ==
Aziz died on 8 April 2019 in Dhaka, Bangladesh.
