= Rahman ministry =

Rahman ministry may refer to:

- Sheikh Mujibur Rahman ministry
- Ziaur Rahman ministry
- Tarique Rahman ministry
