= Mostafa Rashidi Suja =

Bangladeshi politician

S M Mostafa Rashidi Suja

Member of Parliament for Khulna-4
- In office 29 January 2014 – 26 July 2018
- Preceded by: Molla Jalal Uddin
- Succeeded by: Abdus Salam Murshedy
- In office 14 July 1996 – 13 July 2001
- Succeeded by: M. Nurul Islam
- In office 5 March 1991 – 24 November 1995
- Preceded by: Moktar Hossain

Personal details
- Born: 2 March 1953 Bagerhat District, East Bengal, Dominion of Pakistan
- Died: 26 July 2018 (aged 65) Singapore

S M Mostafa Rashidi Suja (2 March 1953 – 26 July 2018) was a Bangladeshi politician. He was elected to the Jatiya Sangsad as a member of the Bangladesh Awami League from the Khulna-4 constituency three times: in 1991, 1996 and 2014.

== Career ==
Suja started his political career around 1968–69 as an activist of the Chhatra Union, the then students' wing of National Awami Party led by Abdul Hamid Khan Bhashani. He got involved with the Jubo League in 1972 and was elected the commissioner of Liakat Nagar Union under the Khulna municipality in 1979.

Suja served as the Jatiya Sangsad whip during 1991–1996.

In February 2007, the Anti-Corruption Commission (ACC) published a list of 50 persons of top corrupt suspects which included Suja's name. The 50 were asked to submit their wealth statements at the ACC office within 72 hours of receiving the notification. In July 2007, Suja, along with his wife Khodeja Rashidi and their two daughters Sanzida Rashidi Shimmi and Taniza Rashidi Turki were sued by the ACC for not submitting wealth statements. In March 2008, a Dhaka court sentenced Suja to 13 years and Khodeja to 3 years in jail on charges of amassing wealth illegally and providing false information. The couple was sent to jail after they surrendered to the trial court in June 2008. In July 2009, they were granted bail by the High Court.

Suja did not get the Awami League nomination for the 2008 general election because of the conviction.

== Personal life ==
Suja had a son, S M Khaledin Rashidi Sukarno.

Suja died at the age of 68 on 27 July 2018, at Mount Elizabeth Hospital in Singapore, where he had sought treatment of kidney problems.
