= Real estate in Bangladesh =

Business sector in Bangladesh

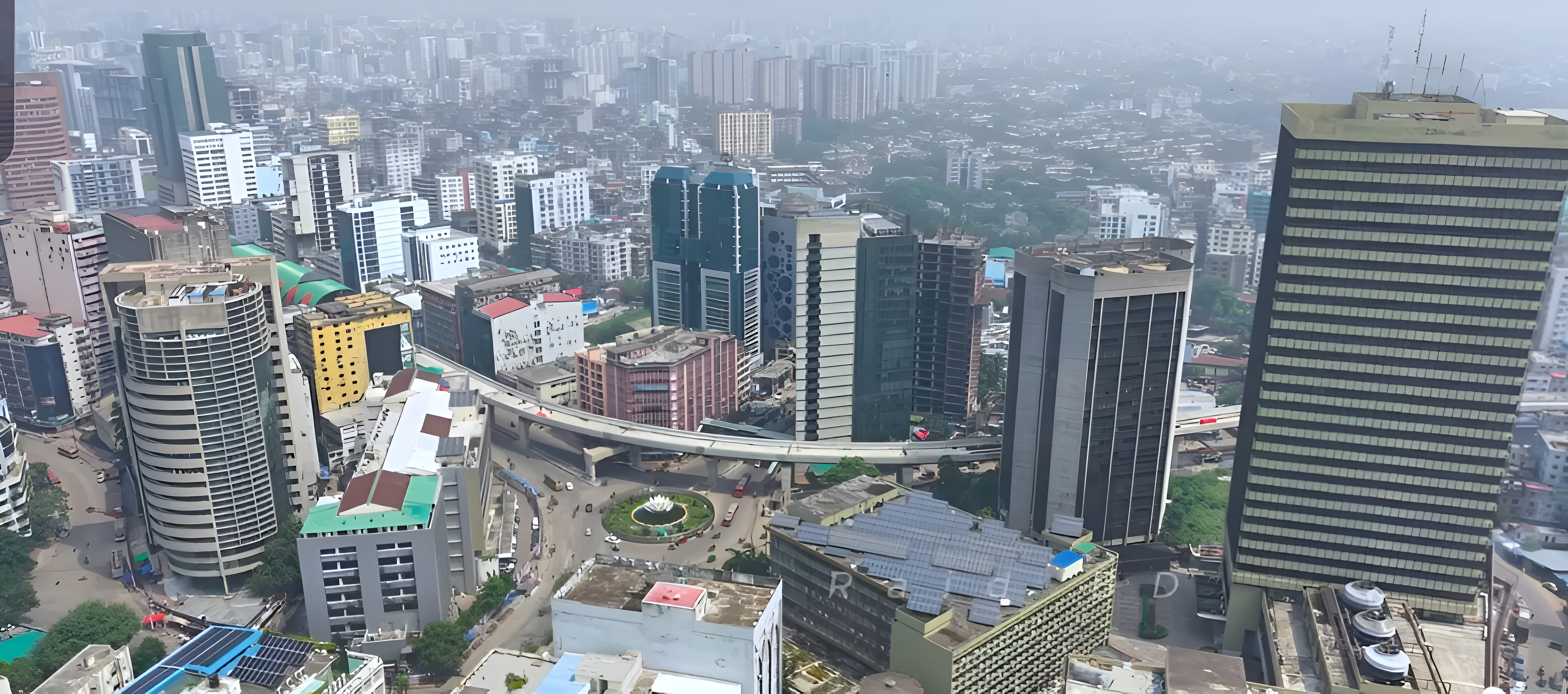
Motijheel, the old downtown of Dhaka

Real estate in Bangladesh refers to the industry and market related to the buying, selling, and development of properties in the country. It is one of the fastest growing sector in Bangladesh.

== History and Journey ==
Bangladesh's first real estate company is Eastern Housing Limited (EHL), established in 1964. Country's first real estate housing project was started this year in Pallabi, Mirpur, Dhaka. However, the real estate industry in Bangladesh has been growing steadily since the 1970s, with the number of developers increasing from 5 in 1980 to 42 in 1988. The industry has been boosted by rapid economic growth, increased demand for real estate housing, and the emergence of a middle class. During the years 1990-1992, Bangladesh underwent economic changes following a shift in government, resulting in a recession within the real estate market due to a decline in investor interest. The Real Estate Housing Association of Bangladesh (REHAB) was established in 1991 to standardize industry practices and promote consumer confidence. The industry has had a positive impact on the economy, with millions of people benefiting from home ownership and rental opportunities.

In 2004-2006, the real estate market in Bangladesh faced a significant increase in investment and a surge in supply, attracting both investors and new entrepreneurs. However, during 2006-08, the real estate sector experienced a downturn, due to a changed socio-political scenario, resulting in declining trends and causing many novice realtors to exit the business. During 2009-2011 the business sector saw a resurgence of investment and a subsequent boom, but unfortunately, this period of growth was short-lived.

In 2012, the real estate business in Bangladesh faced a significant downturn, which was further exacerbated by political unrest in the next year, 2013. As a consequence, many real estate companies struggled to attract clients, despite reducing apartment prices. Additionally, numerous buyers canceled their bookings due to non-payment of installments. However, The sector made a contribution of approximately 7.08% to the country's GDP in the fiscal year of 2014, and when factoring in its linkage industries, the overall contribution reached around 12%. Finally, the situation gradually improved in 2016.

In mid-2018, the Government of Bangladesh introduced home loans for government employees at a 5% interest rate and also reduced real estate property registration costs in 2019. These initiatives resulted in a positive trend in the real estate business of Bangladesh. The sector has contributed 7.8% to the country's GDP in this year, amounting BDT 1.415 trillion.

In 2020, the real estate market value in Bangladesh was BDT 50,000 crore with 15-17% of the market share.

In 2021, the demand in the real estate sector is on the rise. Around 1,50,000 Crore Bangladeshi taka was invested in this sector. Considering the previous real estate history in Bangladesh, the highest number of flats were sold in 2021, surpassing the 10,000 mark. Consequently, this sector contributed around 8% to the GDP in Bangladesh and employed 3.5 million people in this year.

In 2023, the real estate industry in Bangladesh is still growing, but it is facing some challenges, such as the limited availability of land. The sector has contributed 7.93% to the country's Gross Domestic Product (GDP) in the fiscal year of 2023.

=== Dhaka ===
According to the Bangladesh Bank's Monetary Policy Review Report, in 1975, the price of a one-katha plot of land in Gulshan was 25,000 Bangladeshi taka ($1,800 in 1975). By 1990, it had reached nearly 100,000 taka ($2,900 in 1990). In 2020, it was 50 million taka ($590,000 in 2020). Land and flat prices also increased in Dhanmondi, Shantinagar, and Uttara, although not by as much. According to the Institute for Planning and Development, land prices in Dhaka increased by 2,740% between 2000 and 2021, and flat prices increased by 716% over the same period. The institute attributed the increase to "A lack of proper city development plans, ineffective regulations and lack of government initiatives for ensuring housing for all".

== Laws ==
The real estate industry in Bangladesh operates under various laws and regulations, including:

- Town Improvement Act, 1953: This act established Rajdhani Unnayan Kartripakkha (RAJUK) and gives it the authority to plan, develop, and expand Dhaka city, also granting the government powers to acquire land, construct buildings, and address issues of congestion and inadequate housing.
- Real Estate Development and Management Act, 2010: This act mandates registration for developers and enforces regulations. The act also sets out rules for the marketing and sale of real estate.
- Detailed Area Plan (DAP): This is a long-term plan for the development of a specific area in Bangladesh. It is prepared by RAJUK. The DAP sets out the land use, transportation, and other infrastructure plans for the area. REHAB has urged the government of Bangladesh to revise the DAP, citing inconsistencies and potential negative impact on the real estate sector and economy.

== Organizations ==
Real Estate and Housing Association of Bangladesh (REHAB) is a trade association of real estate developers. It has organized real estate fairs in Dhaka and Chittagong.
