= Abdul Latif Khan (politician) =

Bangladeshi politician

- আবদুল লতিফ খান

Member of Parliament from undivided Khulna-4 (present Bagerhat-4)
- In office 1979–1982
- Preceded by: Sheikh Abdul Aziz
- Succeeded by: Sheikh Shahidur Rahman

Personal details
- Born: 1933 Alkulia village of Morrelganj of Bagerhat of Khulna.
- Died: Bagerhat District
- Party: Bangladesh Awami League

Abdul Latif Khan was a Bangladeshi politician affiliated with the Bangladesh Awami League who served the undivided Khulna-4 (present Bagerhat-4) constituency as a member of the Jatiya Sangsad from 1979 to 1982.

== Birth and early life ==
Abdul Latif Khan was born in 1933 in Alkulia village of Morrelganj Upazila of Bagerhat district of Khulna Division.

== Career ==
Abdul Latif Khan was elected to parliament from Khulna-4 as a Bangladesh Awami League candidate in 1979. He served as the BAKSAL district governor of Khulna.

== Death ==
Abdul Latif Khan died in Bagerhat District, Bangladesh.
