= Mir Group =

Bangladeshi multinational conglomerate

- Type: Public
- Industry: Cement; Ceramics; Real Estate; Concrete Block; Ready-mix Concrete
- Founded: January 1, 1960; 66 years ago Bangladesh
- Headquarters: House B 147, Road 22, Mohakhali DOHS, Dhaka, Bangladesh
- Revenue: ▲US$800 million (2024)
- Number of employees: 18,000
- Website: www.mirgroupbd.com

Mir Group is a Bangladeshi industrial conglomerate established in 1940. It has operations across sectors such as construction, cement, ceramics, concrete products, ready-mix concrete, real estate, telecom, and IT.

== History ==
Mir Group traces its roots back to 1960, when Mir Akhter Hossain Limited was founded by Mir Akeb Hossain, a visionary entrepreneur committed to national development through infrastructure. Following his passing in 1969, his son Mir Zaher Hossain, a BUET graduate, took over leadership and expanded the company’s presence in the construction industry.

In its current structure, Mir Group is managed by members of the founding family across three generations. The company's leadership includes Sohela Hossain as President, Shama-E-Zaheer as Chairman, Fida E Zaheer as Vice Chairman, and Naba-E-Zaheer as Managing Director.

What began with railway construction gradually evolved into large-scale infrastructure development—including roads, bridges, airports, and commercial structures. Over time, the group diversified into related industries such as cement, ceramics, real estate, telecom, and IT, establishing key concerns like Mir Cement and Mir Real Estate.

Formed 66 years ago, Mir Group is a public conglomerate that employs thousands of people.

Mir Group engages in various CSR activities, including a 2024 relief campaign by Mir Cement for flood-affected areas in Bangladesh.

== Concerns ==
- Mir Akhter Hossain Limited
- Mir Cement Limited
- Mir Concrete Block Limited
- Mir Ready-mix Concrete Limited
- Mir Real Estate Limited
- Mir Ceramics Limited
- Mir Telecom Limited
- Mir Info Systems Limited
- SEGO Global Limited
- REGO Communications Limited
