= M. Nurul Islam =

Bangladeshi politician (1934–2020)

Member of Parliament for Khulna-4
- In office 15 February 1996 – 12 June 1996
- Preceded by: Mostafa Rashidi Suja
- Succeeded by: Mostafa Rashidi Suja
- In office 1 October 2001 – 28 October 2006
- Preceded by: Mostafa Rashidi Suja
- Succeeded by: Molla Jalal Uddin

Personal details
- Born: 2 May 1934 Khulna
- Died: 21 October 2020 (aged 86) Khulna
- Party: Bangladesh Nationalist Party

M. Nurul Islam (2 May 1934 – 21 October 2020) was a Bangladesh Nationalist Party politician and a member of parliament for Khulna-4.

== Early life ==
Islam was born on 2 May 1934 in Khulna, Khulna District, East Bengal, British India.

== Career ==
Islam was elected to parliament from Khulna-4 as a Bangladesh Nationalist Party candidate in 2001.

== Death ==
Islam died on 21 October 2020 in Khulna City Medical College and Hospital.
