= Haseena Khan =

- হাসীনা খাঁন
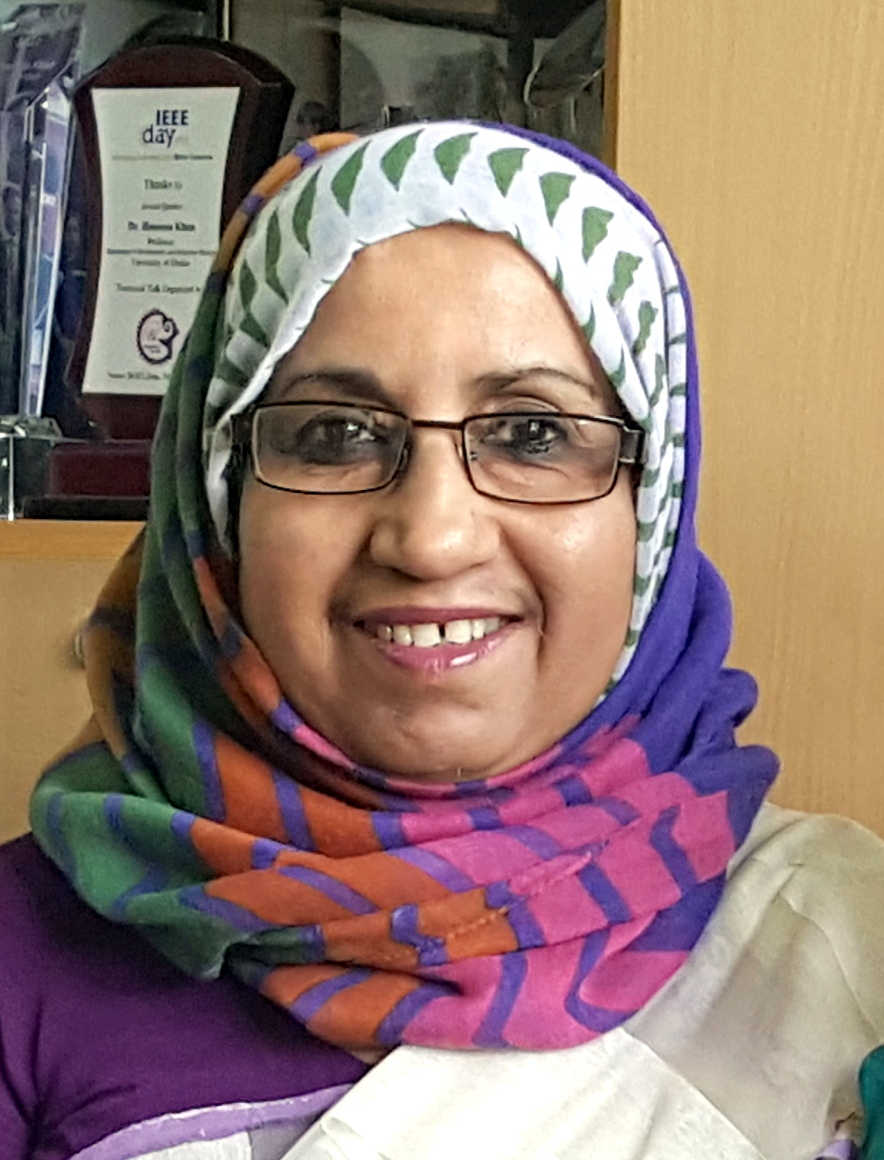
- Born: Gendaria, Old Dhaka, Bangladesh
- Education: University of Dhaka
- Known for: Contribution to Jute genome decoding
- Awards: Independence Day Award, 2019
- Scientific career
- Fields: Genetics, Biochemistry
- Workplaces: University of Dhaka

Haseena Khan is a Bangladeshi scientist, professor and fellow of Bangladesh Academy of Sciences. She is known for her lead on decoding Genome of Tenualosa ilisha from the river Padma. She was awarded Independence Day Award, the highest state award given by the government of Bangladesh for her contribution on research and training. Haseena Khan is also known for her contribution to jute genome decoding under Maqsudul Alam's lead.

== Early life and education ==
Begum Haseena was born in Gendaria, Old Dhaka to a Bengali Muslim family of Dhakaiya heritage. Her father, Muhammad Abdul Khaleq, was a government employee whilst her mother, Begum Khodeza Khatun, was a housewife. Haseena was eighth among nine siblings. Two years after birth, the family moved to transferred to Kolkata, West Bengal as her father was serving as an Ambassador there. As a result, she spent her childhood in Kolkata. Haseena Khan is married and mother of one daughter.

Khan started her schooling at a Missionary School, Queen of The Mission in Kolkata. In 1960, her family moved back to Old Dhaka and she enrolled into Saint Xavier School, Lakkhibazar. She finished her O-level in 1970. Khan passed her HSC from Holy Cross College in 1974 and enrolled in the Department of Biochemistry at Dhaka University. She completed her graduation in 1976. In 1985 Khan received her PhD in Molecular Biology from University of Sussex, England.

== Career ==
Khan started her career as lecturer at Dhaka University in 1982. After completing her PhD in England, she joined Biochemistry Department as an assistant professor. She is the head of the Biochemistry and Molecular Biology Department of Dhaka University from 1995. She has also served as chairman of Department of Genetics and Biotechnology from 2001 to 2005. Currently she is working as a fellow at the Bangladesh Academy of Sciences and Member, University Grants Commission, Bangladesh. In 2018, Haseena Khan and her team decoded the genome sequence of Bangladesh's national fish, Ilish with the "Tenualosa ilisha Genome Project".

Khan resigned from the UGC in August 2024 after the fall of the Sheikh Hasina led Awami League government along with Sazzad Hossain and Muhammed Alamgir.

== Award and achievements ==
1. UNESCO/ROSTSCA Award for Young Scientist, 1989
2. Bangladesh Academy of Sciences, M O Ghani Gold Medal, 2011
3. For contribution on discover genome sequence of Jute, Kazi Mahbubuddin Gold Award, 2015
4. Mani Singh-Farhad Memorial Trust Award, 2016
5. Independence Day Award, 2019
6. ISC Fellow (2023)
