= Government Prafulla Chandra College =

Government P.C. College
- Other name: PCC
- Type: University College
- Established: 1918
- Founder: Acharya Prafulla Chandra Ray
- Affiliations: Bangladesh National University
- Principal: Professor Sk Ziaul Islam
- Location: Harinkhana, Bagerhat, Khulna, Bangladesh; 22.6651°N 89.7839°E
- Campus: Urban
- Website: pccollegebd.com

Government P.C. College (Bengali: সরকারি পি.সি. কলেজ) or Government Prafulla Chandra College, Bagerhat (Bengali: সরকারি প্রফুল্ল চন্দ্র কলেজ, বাগেরহাট) is a college in Bangladesh which is located at Harinkhana, Bagerhat, Khulna Division Bangladesh. It is also known as PCC. It is a National University oriented cum Intermediate affiliated college. Its founder is eminent scientist and philosopher Acharya Prafulla Chandra Ray. This college was established in 1918 and nationalized in 1979.It contains a huge playground and students of this college and students from another institutions come here to play different types of games like cricket,football,badminton etc.There is a spacious pond that extends the beauty of the campus attached to the ground beside the sideway surrounded the whole campus.It is a very popular college to nearby districts students and parents. Students study here are known as PCCian.

== History ==
Under the leadership of Acharya Prafulla Chandra Ray, local landlord, local mass and educationists established the foundation of Bagerhat College in 1916-1918 AD. Later the college got the authenticity from University of Calcutta and renamed as Prafulla Chandra College on 9 August 1918.

At the request of Prafulla Chandra Ray, Rishi Kamakhyacaran Nag accepted the Principality of this college. He carried the responsibility for nearly 22 years. Rishi Kamakhyacaran Nag was a maestro of several subjects like English, Bengali, Sanskrit, Physics, History, Math etc. Along with the governing bodies of this college, he went on door to door for collecting money for this college.

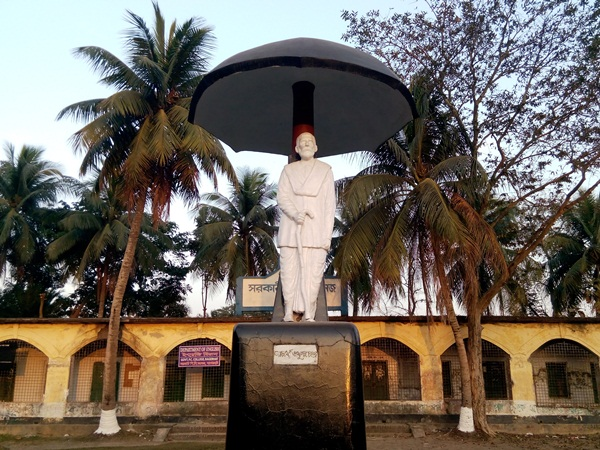
This is the sculpture of eminent philosopher Acharya Prafulla Chandra Ray at the premises of the college.

In 1924, pupils could avail in the honour's courses like English, Mathematics, History and Sanskrit. Other subjects like Bengali, Economics and Arabic also opened honour's courses. In 1947, after the partition, the college's rhythm got the snail's pace badly but in 1960,the college again opened degree courses for science and business faculty. At that period, the total number of students of this college was about 3,000 and the hostel had the accommodation of 500 students. The college was nationalized on 7 May 1979. In 1996, the college opened honours for 14 subjects and masters for 6 subjects.

== Academic departments ==
The university has 16 departments under 4 faculties. The faculties are:

== Faculty of Science ==
- Physics
- Chemistry
- Zoology
- Botany
- Mathematics
- I.C.T

== Faculty of Arts ==
- Bengali
- English
- Philosophy
- History
- Sanskrit
- Islamic History & Culture

sociology

== Faculty of Business Studies ==
- Accounting
- Management

== Faculty of Social Science ==
- Economics
- Political Science

== Ownership ==
The college has 20 acres (8.1 ha) of land. Recently it has 8,000 students and 90 teachers.

== See also ==
- Bagerhat Government High School
- Bagerhat District
- Bagerhat Sadar Upazila
- Bagerhat Stadium
