= Moktar Hossain =

Bangladeshi politician

- মোক্তার হোসেন

Member of Parliament from Khulna-4
- In office 1988–1991
- Preceded by: Sheikh Shahidur Rahman
- Succeeded by: Mostafa Rashidi Suja

Personal details
- Party: Jatiya Party

Moktar Hossain is a Bangladeshi politician affiliated with the Jatiya Party who served the Khulna-4 district as a member of the Jatiya Sangsad from 1988 to 1991.

== Birth and early life ==
Moktar Hossain was born in Khulna District.

== Career ==
Moktar Hossain was elected to parliament from Khulna-4 as a Jatiya Party candidate in 1988. He is the general secretary of Khulna District Jatiya Party.
