= Kutubuddin Ahmed =

Bangladeshi businessman

- কুতুবুদ্দিন আহমেদ
- Born: 21 January 1956 (age 70); Dhaka, East Pakistan, Pakistan
- Education: Bangladesh University of Engineering and Technology
- Occupation: Businessman
- Spouse: Rashida Ahmed
- Children: Tanvir Ahmed; Sumayyah Ahmed
- Website: www.kutubahmed.info

Kutubuddin Ahmed (born 21 January 1956) is a Bangladeshi businessman who is the founder and chairman of the Envoy Group, a conglomerate which operates in multiple sectors, with major operation in the apparel industry. He is a Fellow of the Institute of Engineers, Bangladesh. In 2015 he is a member of the executive committee of the International Chamber of Commerce, Bangladesh, and a director of the Chittagong Stock Exchange.

== Early life and education ==
Ahmed was born on 21 January 1956 in Dhaka in the then East Pakistan to Md. Saadat Ali and Ambia Khatun. He graduated in mechanical engineering from Bangladesh University of Engineering and Technology (BUET).

== Business career ==
Ahmed began his career at Janata Bank, but resigned in 1983 to start his own business. Raising the BDT 10 lakh (US$37,500 in 1984) initial capital for what is now known as the Envoy Group proved difficult. In the end, Ahmed took out a bank loan with his father's house as collateral and brought in a partner, Abdus Salam Murshedy, a striker for Mohammedan Sporting Club who had gained fame in 1982 by scoring a league-record 27 goals, but who had no previous business experience.

In 1984, the partners set up a small factory in the Khilgaon Thana area of Dhaka, equipped it with 46 sewing machines, and hired 200 garment workers. Initially the company sub-contracted for other garment manufacturers. They were early participants in a sector that would become a powerhouse of the Bangladesh economy, but orders were sporadic at first, and the factory was idle for long spells. Sometimes they had to borrow from banks to meet payroll. The turning point came when they received their first order as a primary contractor, 6,500 trousers for a Swedish retailer.

The agent who placed the order was impressed with their work and directed more business their way. In the next 16 months, Envoy Group recorded a BDT 1 crore (US$385,000 in 1985) profit. They paid off their debt and bought two more garment factories, building on the experience gained running their first.

Through expansion, by attracting investment and purchasing existing businesses, Ahmed led the company as it grew over the years into a large manufacturing and exporting group.

Ahmed completed a term as president in Metropolitan Chamber of Commerce and Industry (MCCI), Dhaka and Bangladesh Garment Manufacturers & Exporters Association (BGMEA) in 2001 and 2002.

Ahmed received the "Arthakantha Business Award-2002" by a national financial fortnightly of Bangladesh. He served as president (2004–2005) of the Metropolitan Chamber of Commerce and Industry (MCCI), Dhaka, Bangladesh He received an outstanding achievement award from International Islamic University Chittagong in 2008.

In 2014, Envoy Group had grown to include manufacturers and exporters garments, textiles, real estate, freight forwarding, information technology and computer systems operations. At that time the company was employing about 20,000 people, and had received several awards, including the President's Export Trophy, and the National Export Trophy. In 2015, Ahmed was named a "commercially important person" by the government of Bangladesh.

== Sports ==
Ahmed is a former president of both the Bangladesh Mohammedan Sporting Club, Dhaka, and the Bangladesh Badminton Federation. He was awarded 1997 "Sport Organizer of the Year" by Bangladesh Journalist Association, and received "National Sports Award 2002" for his contribution as a sports organiser in Bangladesh. In 2006 he was awarded the International Olympic Committee (IOC) Trophy for "Sports and the Community", and also Best Sports Organizer by Bangladesh Sports Writers' Association.

In 2009, Ahmed served as the secretary-general of the Bangladesh Olympic Association. In 2014, he is a member of the Sports Environment Committee, Olympic Council of Asia (OCA), and the vice-president of the International Military Sports Council (CISM).

== Community activity ==
Ahmed formed "Saadat Smriti Sadan" charitable foundation in memory of his father Md. Saadat Ali. He established two clinics which provide free medical treatment to the poor and distressed people. He set up a retirement home, Old-Homes for aged people over 65 years in Narshindi, Dhaka.

Ahmed funded the building of a mosque at Nabi Nagar Thana, Comilla, and established a technical institute with computer accessories and sewing machinery tools in Narshindi for providing technical training. He is an advisor to the Campaign against Drug being run by the daily newspaper Prothom Alo, and a member of the Advisory Council of the children's organisation 'Kendriya Kochi Kacher Mela'.

== Personal life ==
Ahmed is married to Rashida Ahmed, a director of Envoy Legacy. They have a son, Tanvir Ahmed, and a daughter, Sumayyah Ahmed. Tanvir is married to Esha Ahmed, a daughter of actress Champa.
