= Sheltech =

Real estate company in Bangladesh

Sheltech (Pvt.) Ltd.
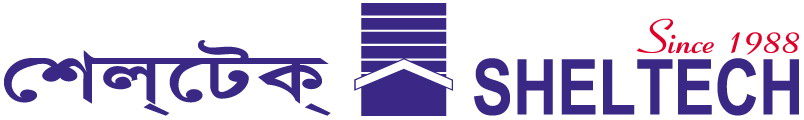
- Industry: Real estate development
- Founded: 1988
- Founder: Kutubuddin Ahmed; Tapan Chowdhury; Samuel Chowdhury; Toufiq M Seraj
- Headquarters: Dhaka, Bangladesh
- Key people: Kutubuddin Ahmed (chairman); Tanvir Ahmed (managing director)
- Revenue: Tk. 1,400 crore (2021)
- Website: www.sheltech-bd.com

Sheltech (Pvt.) Ltd. is a real estate company based in Dhaka, Bangladesh, which was founded in 1988. It is engaged in real estate development and consultancy. It has three chains of boutique hotels named Platinum Suites, Platinum Residence and Platinum Grand. It has constructed over 3700 apartments in Dhaka.

== History ==
Sheltech was founded in 1988 by Tapan Chowdhury, Samuel Chowdhury, Kutubuddin Ahmed, and Taufiq M Seraj. The Chowdhury brothers sold their shares in 2008 as they wanted to focus on their family business, Square Group.

In May 2015, the chairman and managing director of Sheltech were designated as commercially important persons by the government of Bangladesh.

In January, Sheltech completed construction of Sheltech Bithika, the largest real estate project of the company with 184 apartments and 12 commercial spaces in Mirpur Thana, Dhaka. The managing director of Toufiq M Seraj died on a flight of Qatar Airways flying from Dhaka to Doha on 21 June 2019. Tanvir Ahmed was appointed the new managing director of Sheltech in August. Sk Bashir Ahmed was appointed vice-chairman in October.

The chairman of Sheltech Group, Kutubuddin Ahmed, is also the chairman of Envoy Group.

In March 2022, Sheltech Brokerage Limited signed an agreement with United Arab Emirates based ZagTrader PLC to improve its IT infrastructure.

== Subsidiaries ==
- Sheltech Holdings Limited
- Sheltech Engineering Limited
- Sheltech Protection Services Limited
- Sheltech Brokerage Limited
- Sheltech Technology Limited
- Sheltech Ceramics Limited
- Sheltech Consultants (Private) Limited
- Bengal Meat
- Sreemangal Tea Estate Limited
- Sheltech Property Management Limited
- Sheltech Express Limited
- Grind Tech Limited
- Sheltech Homes Limited
- Envoy-Sheltech Aviation Limited (partnership with Envoy Group)

== See also ==
- List of real estate companies of Bangladesh
- Platinum Suites
