= Farida Rahman (disambiguation) =

Farida Rahman (1945–2021) was a Bangladesh Awami League politician and a Jatiya Sangsad member.

Farida Rahman may also refer to:

- Farida Rahman (politician), Bangladeshi lawyer and politician
- Farida Rahman (professor), Bangladeshi educationist and politician
