= Mollah Jalaluddin Ahmed =

Bangladeshi politician

Minister of Land Revenue
- In office 16 March 1973 – 8 July 1974
- Preceded by: Abdur Rab Serniabat
- Succeeded by: Phani Bhushan Majumder

Minister of Posts, Telecommunications and Information Technology
- In office 13 April 1972 – 16 March 1973
- Preceded by: Muhammad Mansur Ali
- Succeeded by: M. A. G. Osmani

Member of Parliament
- In office 18 February 1979 – 18 December 1979
- Preceded by: Nurul Qadir Junu
- Succeeded by: Sheikh Selim
- Constituency: Faridpur-10
- In office 7 March 1973 – 6 November 1975
- Preceded by: Position Established
- Succeeded by: Phani Bhushan Majumder
- Constituency: Faridpur-11

Personal details
- Born: 1 February 1926 Gopalganj, East Bengal
- Died: 18 December 1979 (aged 53) Dhaka, Bangladesh
- Party: Bangladesh Awami League

Mollah Jalaluddin Ahmed (1 February 1926 – 18 December 1979) was a Bangladesh Awami League politician and lawyer. A member of Awami League, Ahmed served as the Minister of Land Revenue and Minister of Posts, Telecommunications and Information Technology of the Government of Bangladesh from 1973 to 1974 and 1972 to 1973 respectively. He was also elected to the parliament in 1973 and 1979.

== Early life ==
Ahmed was born on 1 February 1926 in Gopalganj, East Bengal. He completed his Masters in Political Science from Dhaka University in 1952. In 1953 obtained his LL.B degree from the same university. He started his legal career at the Dhaka Bar.

== Career ==
He started politics with the Bangiya Muslim Student League. He was involved in the Sylhet Referendum. He is one of the founding members of the Awami Muslim League. He was active in the language movement of 1952. From 1964 to 1972, he was a member of the Executive Committee of Awami League. In 1966, he was jailed for his involvement in the protests for Awami League's Six Point Program. He was released in 1968.

In 1970, he was elected to the Pakistan National Assembly. During the Bangladesh Liberation War, he visited countries in the Middle East as representative of the Mujibnagar government to gather support for the Bangladesh side. He was the Ambassador of Bangladesh to Lebanon. In 1973, he was elected to Bangladesh Parliament from Gopalganj. He served as a minister in the government. From 1972 to 1973, he was the Minister of Post, Telegraph and Telephone, and later Minister of Forest, Fishery and Livestock, Land Revenue and Land Reforms. In 1974, he resigned from the cabinet over his medical condition. He was elected to Parliament in 1979 from Gopalganj.

== Death ==
He died in 1979 in Dhaka, Bangladesh.
