= PRAN-RFL Group =

Bangladeshi conglomerate

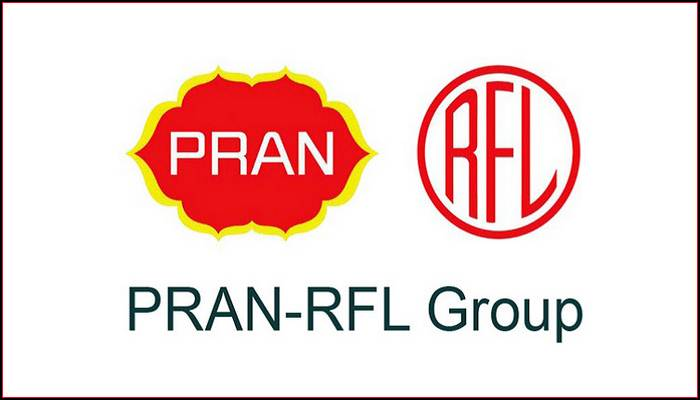
- Logo since 1981

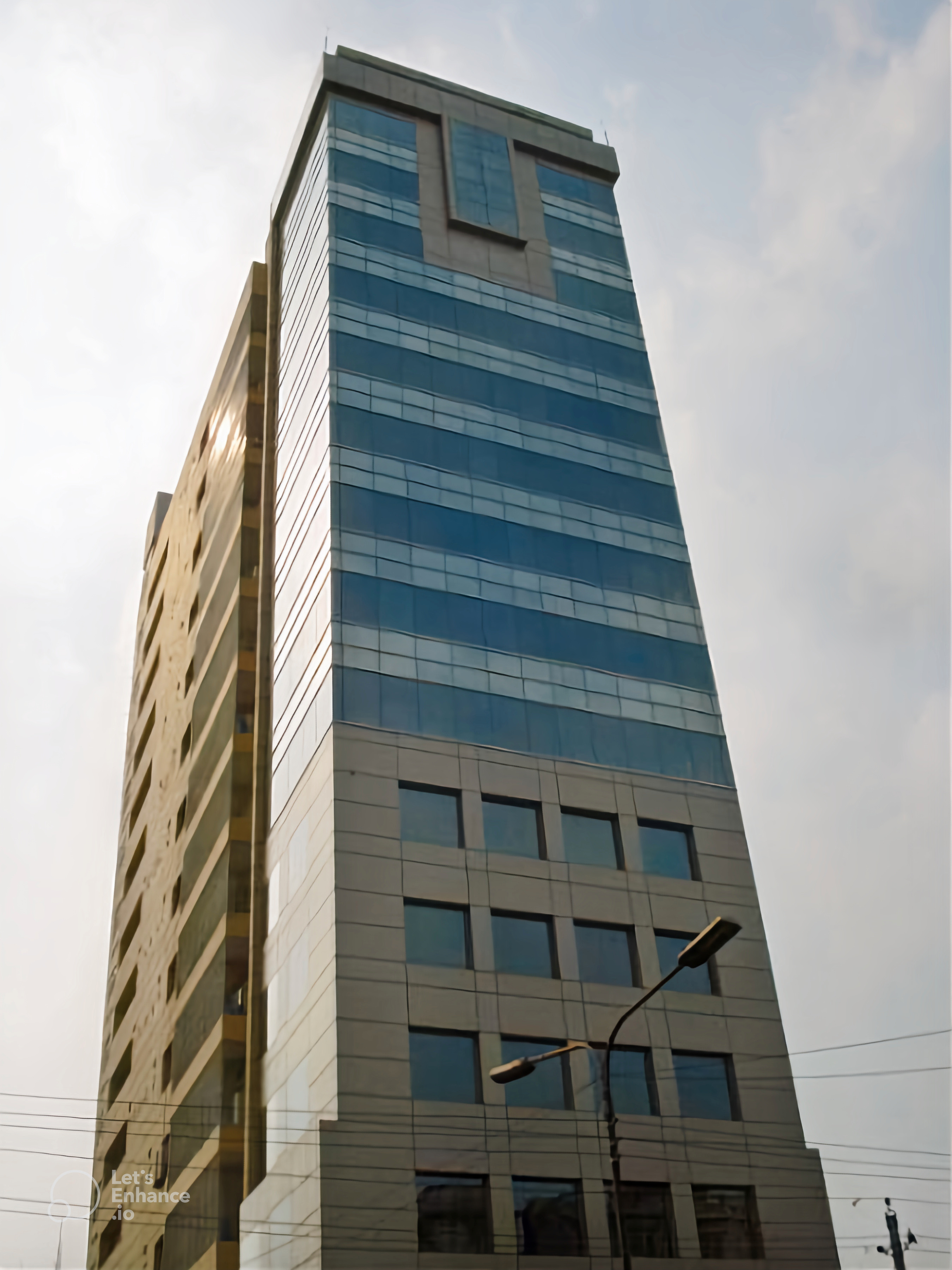
- Pran-RFL Centre in Badda
- Type: Public
- Traded as: DSE: (PRAN) CSE: (PRAN); DSE: (RFL); CSE: (RFL)
- Industry: Consumer goods
- Founded: 1 January 1981; 45 years ago
- Founder: Amjad Khan Chowdhury
- Headquarters: Dhaka, Bangladesh
- Area served: Worldwide
- Key people: Ahsan Khan Chowdhury (Chairperson); Eleash Mridha (Managing Director); Mohammad Yeamin (Chief financial officer)
- Products: List: Foods; Condiments; Ice creams; Energy drinks; Wellbeing vitamins; Minerals and supplements; Tea; instant coffees; Home appliances; pharmaceutical and consumer healthcare products; Breakfast cereals; Cleaning agents; Plastic Accessories for home; Pet foods; Toothpastes; Bottled waters; Soft drinks; Study Accessories; Personal care
- Brands: List: Pran Foods Ltd.; RFL Plastics; Vision Electronics; Jhatpat frozen food; Bisk Club Biscuits; All Time Bakery; Wonder Bakery; Pran Beverages; Pran Dairy Products; WINNER Electronics; SHINE Bathroom Fittings; CLICK Cables; DURANTA Bicycles; Regal Furnitures
- Revenue: ▲ ৳4.69 billion (US$38 million) (FY 2022)
- Operating income: ▲ ৳359.72 million (US$2.9 million) (FY 2022)
- Net income: ▲ ৳83 million (US$680,000) (FY 2022)
- Total assets: ▲ ৳1.92 billion (US$16 million) (FY 2022)
- Total equity: ▲ ৳998.87 million (US$8.1 million) (FY 2022)
- Number of employees: 10,757 (2022)
- Website: https://www.pranfoods.net/ (Pran Foods); https://rflbd.com/ (RFL Plastics); https://othoba.com/ (E-commerce) (Online Shopping)

PRAN-RFL Group (Bengali: প্রাণ-আরএফএল গ্রুপ) is a Bangladeshi conglomerate, founded in 1981 by Amjad Khan Chowdhury. It is one of the largest conglomerates in Bangladesh Pran-RFL Group is headquartered in Dhaka, Bangladesh, and employs over 100,000 people worldwide making it the largest employer brand in the country. The group operates under several subsidiaries, including Pran Foods, RFL Plastics, Pran-RFL Healthcare, and many others.

Pran Foods is the flagship company of the group and RFL is the subsidiary company mostly consisting of plastic and steel products.

== History ==
PRAN (Programme for Rural Advancement Nationally) was established in 1981 by retired Major General Amjad Khan Chowdhury and has become one of the largest food and beverage brands in Bangladesh. PRAN pioneered agribusiness in Bangladesh by providing farmers with guaranteed prices. PRAN Foods, a subsidiary of the PRAN-RFL Group, produces a number of agricultural products under the PRAN banner. PRAN established a subsidiary company in UAE in 2003.

In 2008, the company announced plans to open a production facility in Tripura, India, after the Indian government lifted the ban on direct investment from Bangladesh in 2007. The PRAN group's exports had reached 10 billion taka by 2016, with the biggest markets for the company in India, Saudi Arabia, the UAE, Malaysia, and Oman. The same year the revenue for PRAN exceeded US$500 million. PRAN started exporting potatoes in March 2016.

In April 2016, PRAN started to export cassava and the first shipment, worth US$3 million, was sent to New Zealand. PRAN has 80 thousand direct employees and 200 thousand indirect employees. PRAN exports to over 118 countries.

PRAN started exporting through river route to India from Bangladesh in March 2021.

Pran-RFL Group has several joint ventures with international companies, such as PepsiCo, Danone, and Nestlé.

== Businesses ==
PRAN-RFL Group contains two Groups, called PRAN-Group & RFL-Group.

Businesses operating under these groups contains several registered companies/businesses. Below are some of them:

Registered Business & Sister Concerns of PRAN-RFL Group
PRAN Group	RFL Group	Other sister concerns
Agricultural Marketing Co. Ltd	Rangpur Foundry Limited	Property Development Limited
Mymensingh Agro Limited	Gonga Foundry Limited	AKC (Pvt.) Limited
Banga Bakers Limited	RFL Plastics Limited	AKC Management Limited
Natore Agro Limited	Durable Plastic Limited	Logi-Care Overseas Limited
Natore Dairy Limited	Banga Plastic International Limited	Career Builders Limited
PRAN Agro Limited	Rangpur Metal Industries Limited	Banga Trading House Limited
PRAN Agro farm Business Limited	Banga Building Materials Limited	Tasty Treat
PRAN Beverage Limited	Trade Environment Limited	RFL Door
PRAN Confectionery Limited	Allplast Bangladesh Limited	Jagonews24.com
PRAN Dairy Limited	RFL Electronics Limited	Jago FM
PRAN Foods Limited	Getwell Limited	
Banga Miller Limited	Bangladesh Lift Industries Limited	
Banga Agro Processing Limited	RFL Construction Limited	
Advance Personal Care Limited	Multi -Line Industries Limited	
Chorka Fashions Limited	Accessories World Limited	
Chorka Textile Limited	Habiganj Ceramics Limited	
Habiganj Agro Limited	Habiganj Glassware Limited	
Habiganj Textile Limited	Habiganj Metal Industries Limited	
Packmat Industries Limited	RFL Exports Limited	
	Vision Electronics	
Sun Basic Chemicals Limited		
Sylvan Technologies Limited	Sera Water Tank	
Sylvan Poultry Limited	Shine Tiles	
PRAN Exports Limited	CLICK Light	
	Duranta Bicycle	
	Bizli Cables	
	Rainbow Paints	
	Saudi Lubricants	

=== Duranta ===
Duranta, a part of the group makes bicycles for the international and domestic market. They launched the country's first ebike. The venture started in 2015.

=== Othoba ===
Othoba is the company's e-commerce expansion offering discounted pricing on live animal and goods with home delivery or pickup option.

=== Proton ===
Proton Mobile is the brand for the group's manufactured and marketed feature phones and smartphones.

=== Rainbow paints ===
Rainbow paints is the paints division of the company. It recently introduced the first locally manufactured spray paint.

=== Vision Electronics ===
Vision Electronics is the home appliance, and consumer electronics subdivision of the group. It was established in 2013.

== Criticism and controversies ==
The company is accused of land grabbing, revenue evasion, fake tender of 305 crore Taka in the name of Rangpur Metal Industries and selling substandard consumer goods. There are also allegations of digital corruption and looting of thousands of crores of taka with the illegal assistance of officials from the Public Works Department. The Pran-RFL company of Alipur, Habiganj, has been accused of dumping banned and harmful contaminated waste into the Sutang River, the only river in Lakhai Upazila of Habiganj district, for a long time.

The Bangladesh High Court issued a rule asking why the family of an employee of the company should not be compensated for the death of the employee in 2018. In 2019, a Bangladesh court ordered the arrest of the company's managing director after BSTI tests found excess ash in turmeric powder produced by Pran Agro Limited. In July 2025, the local administration seized 2,500 liters of adulterated milk from the Pran Company's hub centre in Chatmohar Upazila of Pabna; further, a mobile court sentenced three Pran officials to six months in prison each for storing and supplying adulterated milk.

In 2021, International Majlis-e Tahaffuz-e-Khatm-e Nobuwat Bangladesh called for a boycott of PRAN-RFL and all their products at all levels, personal, social, and state. In November 2025, a group of 101 Bangladeshi Islamic scholars in Bangladesh called for a boycott of Pran RFL products, accusing it of funding Qadianis (Ahmadis), and claiming it as anti-Islamic. In December 2025, in front of the National Press Club, some employees of PRAN-RFL accused the company of religiously hateful activities against Muslim employees.
