= Eastern Housing Limited =

Bangladeshi residential real estate company

- Company type: Ltd
- Traded as: DSE: EHL
- Industry: Housing
- Founded: Navana Group 1964
- Headquarters: Motijheel, Dhaka, Bangladesh
- Website: www.easternhousing.com

Eastern Housing Limited (EHL) is a public limited company in Bangladesh working in real estate development. The company was established in 1964 and became a member of REHAB in 1992. EHL was established with the objective of the development of land for housing in the urban areas of Dhaka. It is involved in construction, engineering, manufacturing and trading activities. It has been responsible for redefining the environment in Dhaka, the capital of Bangladesh, along with other major developers.

Eastern Housing Limited is listed on the Dhaka Stock Exchange and Chittagong Stock Exchange, the only retail company listed on the stock exchanges in Bangladesh.

== Background ==
Eastern Housing Limited is a concern of Islam Group formed in late 1965 under the Chairmanship of Jahurul Islam. It was one of the first to provide low-cost housing to the residents of Bangladesh (then East Pakistan). The company developed Aftabnagar, which is officially known as Jahurul Islam City.

While Eastern Housing Limited started operations by developing real estate mostly within Dhaka, it later expanded outside the city. It regularly takes part in REHAB real estate fairs, both at home and abroad, and experiences sell-out performances. The slogan of Eastern Housing Limited is Apan Thikana Gore Dey, which translates to builds your own address.

Engineer Md Akramuzzaman, director of the company, took part in the national dialogue on "Strengthening the Role of Private Sector Housing in Bangladesh" organized by Centre for Policy Dialogue in November 2003. In January 2004, the company became a part of the government initiative to build housing for expatriate Bangladeshis in Gulshan Thana, Dhaka. In 2005, Eastern Housing became the highest tax-payer among the 101 real estate developers listed with National Board of Revenue (NBR).

On October 16, 2006, RAJUK, the Dhaka City development authority, sent notice about "unauthorized" construction to the Ministry of Housing which included projects of Eastern Housing. Dr. Asaduzzaman, vice chairman of Islam Group, ruled out the possibility of any dubious practices. Some of the real estate developed by Eastern Housing have has faced criticism. The Eastern Tower, an 18-storied apartment block in New Eskaton, Dhaka, is criticized for not installing ample emergency escapes, while the South Banasree project is criticized for getting waterlogged during the monsoon.

By 2008, Eastern Housing Limited has sold over 620 acres (2.5 km^{2}) of land to its customers in 24 different projects approximating some 13,000 plots. It has also successfully completed over 3,500 units of apartment and has built some modern shopping plazas and commercial complexes numbering approximating 1500 units. Overall EHL has got more than 40% market share in residential plot and apartment development business in Bangladesh.

As of January 1, 2008 the total market capitalization of the company is BDT 878 million. Of this 48% is held by sponsor company Islam Group of Industries, 33% by general public, 18% by different financial institutions and 1% by foreign investors. In 1994 the company listed with Dhaka Stock Exchange where it is listed as a Category A (highest ranking) company. Between 2001 and 2007 the company has generated dividend yield of 8%-13% for its investors. The company held its last annual general meeting on December 18, 2006, when it announced BDT 72 million net profit after tax, which translates to BDT 11.54 of earnings per share. A consistently profitable venture, Eastern Housing paid 10% dividend to stockholders in 2003, and a 15% in 2007.

Bangladesh High Court ordered Eastern Housing Limited to maintain the status quo on water bodies in their Aftabnagar residential project in March 2015.

In November 2020, locals in Nasirabad, Eastern Dhaka, accused Eastern Housing Limited for forcefully grabbing their land in order to expand Aftabnagar (Jahirul Islam City).

Eastern Housing Limited made a profit of 550 million BDT in 2022.

== See also ==
- List of real estate companies of Bangladesh
