= List of real estate companies of Bangladesh =

This is a list of notable real estate companies of Bangladesh.

- Bashundhara Group
- Building Technology & Ideas Ltd.
- Concord Group
- Eastern Housing Limited
- M. M. Ispahani Limited
- Navana Group
- Orion Group (Bangladesh)
- Rangs Group
- Sheltech
- Shanta Holdings Limited
