= Amjad Khan Chowdhury =

Bangladeshi retired army officer and founder of PRAN-RFL Group (1939–2015)

- আমজাদ খান চৌধুরী
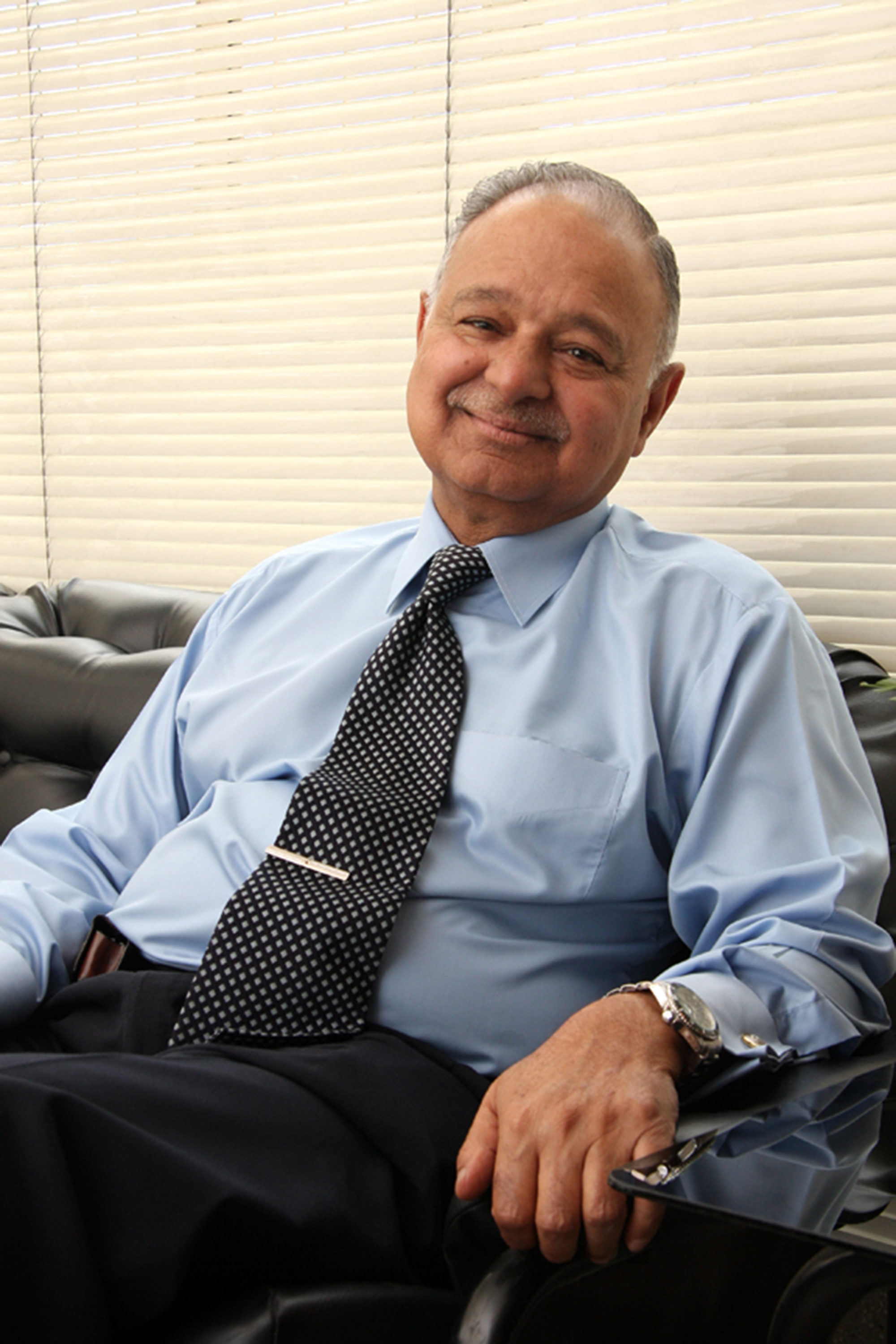
- Chowdhury in 2015
- Born: 10 November 1939; Natore, Bengal, British India
- Died: 8 July 2015 (aged 75); Duke University Hospital, North Carolina, U.S.
- Education: Nabakumar Institution; Pakistan Military Academy; Australian Defence College
- Spouse: Sabiha Amjad
- Children: 4
- Military career
- Allegiance: Bangladesh; Pakistan (Before 1973)
- Branch: Bangladesh Army; Pakistan Army
- Service years: 1959–1981
- Rank: Major General
- Unit: Armoured Corps
- Commands: QMG of Army Headquarters; GOC of 33rd Infantry Division; GOC of 11th Infantry Division; Commander of 93rd Armoured Brigade
- Conflicts: Indo-Pakistani War of 1965
- Other work: Founder & Ex-Chairman of PRAN-RFL Group; Founder & Ex-Chairman of Real Estate and Housing Association of Bangladesh

Amjad Khan Chowdhury (10 November 1939 – 8 July 2015) was a Bangladeshi Army officer and founder of Bangladeshi conglomerate PRAN-RFL Group.

== Early life and family ==
Chowdhury was born on 10 November 1939 to Ali Qasim Khan Chowdhury and Amatur Rahman. He belongs to the branch of the Chowdhury family of Natore. His father was an inspector general of police and a former general secretary of Ahmadiyya Jamaat Bengal. His grandfather, Khan Bahadur Abul Hashim Khan Chowdhery, was a former Amir of Ahmadiyya Jamaat Bengal who translated several Ahmadiyya texts into the English language and was buried at the Bahishti Maqbara in Qadian.

== Education ==
He was educated at the Nabakumar Institution in Dhaka. Chowdhury is a graduate of the Pakistan Military Academy and Australian Staff College.

== Career ==
Chowdhury joined the Pakistan Army in 1956 and was commissioned in 1959. He was posted in 29 Cavalry as a major during March 1971 and was sent to West Pakistan after the start of the Bangladesh Liberation War. He joined the Bangladesh Army in 1973 after being repatriated from Pakistan, after the independence of Bangladesh. He served as the GOC of Comilla Cantonment and Bogra Cantonment. He was also the quarter master general of the Bangladesh Army. He retired from the Bangladesh Army in 1981 with the rank of major general.

After retiring from the army, he founded PRAN-RFL Group. In 1981 he founded RFL (Rangpur Foundry Ltd) to make irrigation pumps. In 1985 he founded PRAN to produce agro products. By 2016, PRAN exported to 130 countries and employed 80 thousand people directly. He was the founder president of the Real Estate and Housing Association of Bangladesh (REHAB) and the Bangladesh Agro-Processors' Association. He also served as the former president of the Underprivileged Children's Education Programme.

== Death ==
Chowdhury died on 8 July 2015 in Duke University Hospital, North Carolina, United States, from cardiac complications and diabetes. He was buried in Banani Army Graveyard, Dhaka. He was survived by his wife, Sabiha Amjad, and children Azar J. K. Chowdhury, Ahsan Khan Chowdhury, Sheira Haq, and Uzma Chowdhury.
