= Platinum Suites =

Hotel in Banani, Bangladesh

Coordinates: 23.7900°N 90.4081°E

Executive Suites Ltd.
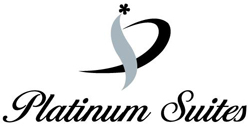
- Company type: Limited
- Industry: Hotel
- Founded: 2008
- Headquarters: Platinum Suites; House no.58, Road No.11, Block-F, Banani, Dhaka-1213. Bangladesh
- Key people: Tanvir Ahmed, Director Development
- Products: Lodging, Food service

Platinum Suites Bangladesh is a seven-floor boutique hotel located in Banani, Bangladesh. The first two floors comprise the hotel entrance, lobby and two dining facilities. There are 6 rooms on each floor. The hotel was developed by Sheltech (Pvt) Ltd., a Bangladeshi real estate developer.

== Overview ==
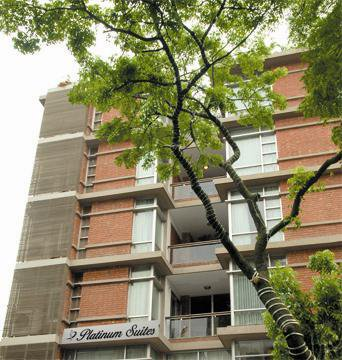
Platinum Suites from front.

The hotel has 12 large suites, 5 studio suites, 4 theme suites and 3 regular suites, for a total of 24 suites. The hotel has three dining facilities: Cafe Nemo, Terra Bistro, and Platinum Terrace.
