= Ahmad Shamsul Islam =

Bangladeshi scientist and educator (1924–2025)

- Born: 6 August 1924; Bangladesh
- Died: 14 April 2025 (aged 100)
- Education: Ph.D.
- Alma mater: Presidency University, Kolkata; Manchester University
- Children: Yousuf Mahbubul Islam (son) Zeba Islam Seraj (daughter)

Ahmad Shamsul Islam (Bengali: আহমদ শামসুল ইসলাম; 6 August 1924 – 14 April 2025) was a Bangladeshi scientist and educator. He was awarded Ekushey Padak in 1987 by the Government of Bangladesh for his contribution to education. He served as a Professor of the Department of Botany at the University of Dhaka until his death.

== Education and career ==
Islam earned his bachelor's and master's degrees from Presidency University, Kolkata in 1945 and 1947 respectively. He obtained a Ph.D. from Manchester University, England in 1954. For his postdoctoral research he went on to Cornell University, University of California, Davis, the University of Nottingham and University of Tokyo.

Islam joined BRAC University as a consultant in August 2003.

He served as the moderator of Global Network of Bangladeshi Biotechnologists (GNOBB). In 2008, he was proposed by Maqsudul Alam to initiate the jute genome sequencing project.

Islam was the founding editor of Sind University Research Journal, Pakistan Journal of Botany, Science Series of Dhaka University, Dar es Salaam University Scientific Research Journal and Bangladesh Journal of Botany.

== Personal life and death ==
Islam's father, Moulvi Serajul Islam, was a professor at Rajshahi College and Chittagong College. Islam had a son, Yousuf Mahbubul Islam, the current vice-chancellor of Daffodil International University and a daughter, Zeba Islam Seraj, a professor of Biochemistry at the University of Dhaka. Islam resided in Austin, Texas. He died on 14 April 2025, at the age of 100.

== Awards ==
- The Currie Memorial Prize (1954)
- Gold Medal by Bangladesh Academy of Sciences (1987)

== Sources ==
- https://www.newagebd.net/post/country/262338/ekushey-padak-winner-prof-ahmad-shamsul-islam-dies
- https://www.bssnews.net/others/263091
