= Khulna-4 =

Bangladeshi parliamentary constituency

Coordinates: 22.80°N 89.64°E

- Parliamentary constituency constituency for the Jatiya Sangsad
- District: Khulna District
- Division: Khulna Division
- Electorate: 373,885 (2026)

Current constituency
- Created: 1973
- Party: Bangladesh Nationalist Party
- Member: SK Azizul Bari Helal
- ← 101 Khulna-3 103 Khulna-5 →

Khulna-4 is a constituency represented in the Jatiya Sangsad (National Parliament) of Bangladesh since 2026 by SK Azizul Bari Helal of the Bangladesh Nationalist Party.

== Boundaries ==
The constituency encompasses Rupsa and Terokhada upazilas, and all but two union parishads of Dighalia Upazila: Arongghata and Jugipole.

== History ==
The constituency was created for the first general elections in newly independent Bangladesh, held in 1973.

Ahead of the 2018 general election, the Election Commission reduced the boundaries of the constituency by removing two union parishads of Dighalia Upazila: Ayongghata and Jogipole.

== Members of Parliament ==
Election	Member	Party
1973	Sheikh Abdul Aziz	Awami League
1979	Abdul Latif Khan	Awami League
Major Boundary Changes
1986	Sheikh Shahidur Rahman	Workers Party of Bangladesh
1988	Moktar Hossain	Jatiya Party
1991	Mostafa Rashidi Suja	Awami League
Feb 1996	M. Nurul Islam	Bangladesh Nationalist Party
Jun 1996	Mostafa Rashidi Suja	Awami League
2001	M. Nurul Islam	Bangladesh Nationalist Party
2008	Molla Jalal Uddin	Awami League
2014	Mostafa Rashidi Suja	Awami League
2018	Abdus Salam Murshedy	Awami League
2026	SK Azizul Bari Helal	Bangladesh Nationalist Party

== Elections ==
=== Elections in the 2010s ===
Mostafa Rashidi Suja died in July 2018. Abdus Salam Murshedy was elected unopposed on 4 September, as he was the only candidate in the by-election scheduled for later that month.

Mostafa Rashidi Suja was elected unopposed in the 2014 general election after opposition parties withdrew their candidacies in a boycott of the election.

=== Elections in the 2000s ===
General Election 2008: Khulna-4
Party	Candidate	Votes	%	±%
AL	Molla Jalal Uddin	109,216	50.6	+8.3
BNP	Sharif Shah Kamal	97,547	45.2	−9.0
IAB	Younus Ahammed Sheikh	8,837	4.1	N/A
BML	Wazir Ali Morol	176	0.1	N/A
Majority		11,669	5.4	−6.5
Turnout		215,776	88.9	+7.9
AL gain from BNP				

General Election 2001: Khulna-4
Party	Candidate	Votes	%	±%
BNP	M. Nurul Islam	102,957	54.2	+15.7
AL	Mostafa Rashidi Suja	80,307	42.3	+2.2
IJOF	Mallik Mahiuddin	6,396	3.4	N/A
Independent	Nurunnabi Khan Paltu	301	0.2	N/A
Jatiya Party (M)	Mallik Sahidul Islam	77	0.0	N/A
Majority		22,650	11.9	+10.3
Turnout		190,038	81.0	+2.2
BNP gain from AL				

=== Elections in the 1990s ===
General Election June 1996: Khulna-4
Party	Candidate	Votes	%	±%
AL	Mostafa Rashidi Suja	59,566	40.1	+5.3
BNP	M. Nurul Islam	57,221	38.5	+7.5
Jamaat	Md. Abdul Hamid	12,655	8.5	N/A
JP(E)	Mollah Momin Uddin Ahmmed	10,485	7.1	−11.1
IOJ	Shakhawat Hossain	8,448	5.7	−2.9
Bangladesh Muslim League (Jamir Ali)	S. M. Moslem Uddin	165	0.1	N/A
Majority		2,345	1.6	−2.3
Turnout		148,540	78.8	+20.5
AL gain from BNP				

General Election 1991: Khulna-4
Party	Candidate	Votes	%	±%
AL	Mostafa Rashidi Suja	41,693	34.8	
BNP	A. Khaled Md. Zia Uddin	37,071	31.0	
JP(E)	Kazi Aminul Haq	21,816	18.2	
IOJ	Shakhawat Hossain	10,316	8.6	
UCL	Sayeedur Rahman Sheikh	4,362	3.6	
Bangladesh Muslim League (Aian Uddin)	S. M. Amzad Hossain	1,659	1.4	
Independent	Shahidul Islam	1,416	1.2	
Jatiya Samajtantrik Dal-JSD	Md. Moinul Islam	618	0.5	
Independent	Moktar Hossain	322	0.3	
Zaker Party	S. M. Abul Hossain	298	0.2	
BAKSAL	Sk. Abdus Salam	118	0.1	
Majority		4,622	3.9	
Turnout		119,689	58.3	
BNP gain from				
