= Matiur Rahman (politician, born 1933) =

Bangladeshi politician

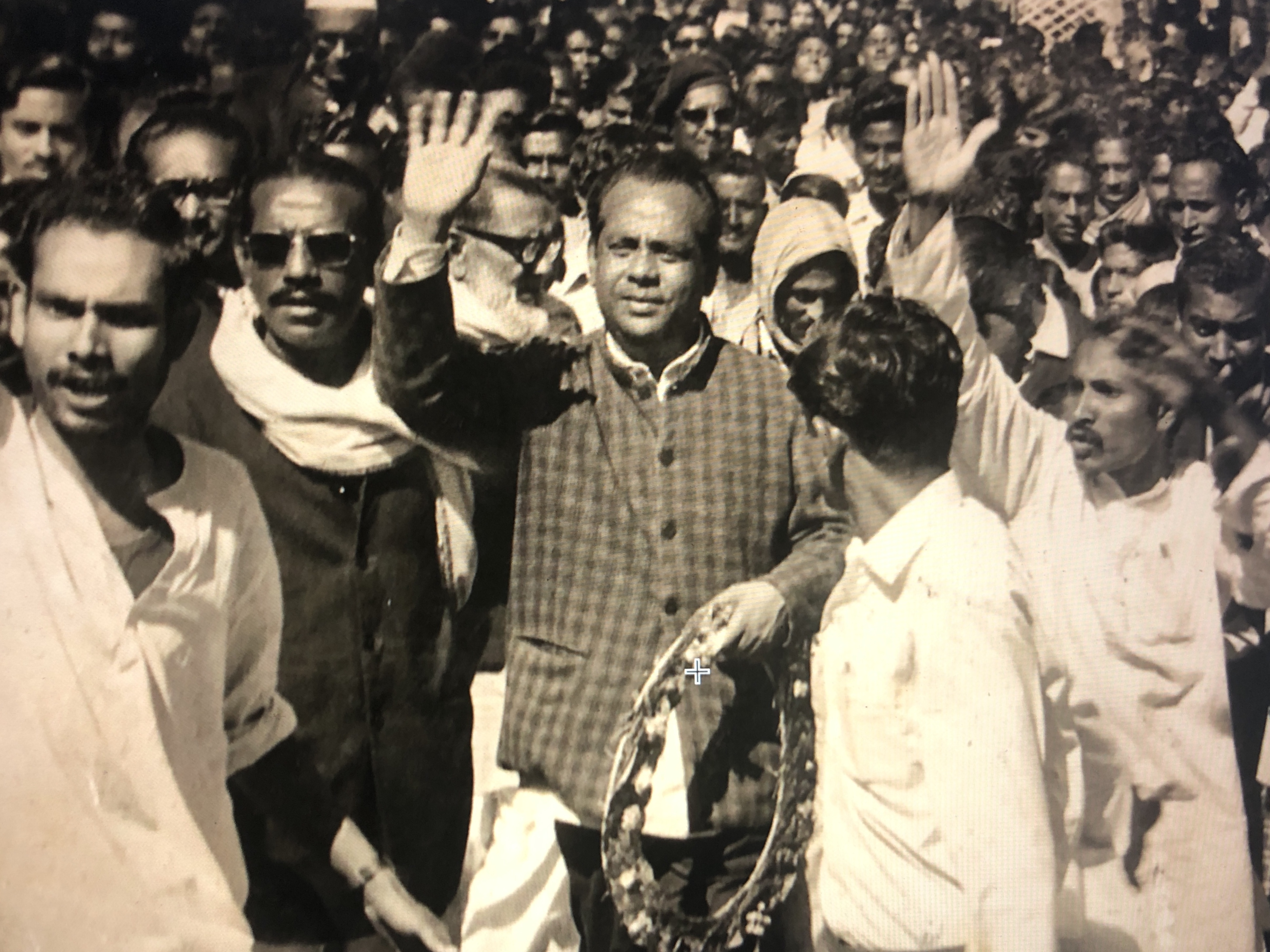

Minister of Local Government, Rural Development and Co-operatives
- In office 16 March 1973 – 7 July 1974

Minister of Housing
- In office 13 April 1972 – 17 March 1973

Member of the Bangladesh Parliament for Rangpur-11
- In office 7 April 1973 – 6 November 1975

Personal details
- Born: 20 September 1933 Rangpur, Bengal Presidency, British India
- Died: 1 March 2003 (aged 69) Singapore
- Party: Bangladesh Awami League

Matiur Rahman (20 September 1933 – 1 March 2003) was a Bangladeshi politician and an organizer of the Liberation War who was a Jatiya Sangsad member representing the (now defunct) Rangpur 11 constituency. He was the minister of housing in the second cabinet of Sheikh Mujibur Rahman and the minister of local government, rural development and cooperatives in the third cabinet.

== Early life ==
Matiur Rahman was born in Rasulpur village of Kumedpur in Pirganj of Rangpur district. After passing BA, he started business in Dhaka.

== Career ==
Rahman was the organizer of the war of liberation in 1971. He played an active role in all the political activities of the time including the 6-point movement, language movement and participation in the war of independence of Bangladesh. During the war of liberation he served as the chairman of nine people under sector number six. He was elected a member of the National Assembly in the 1970 general election of Pakistan.

He was elected to parliament from Rangpur-11 as an Awami League candidate in 1973. He was the minister of housing in the second cabinet of Sheikh Mujibur Rahman and the minister of local government, rural development and cooperatives in the third cabinet.

Rahman was the president of the Dhaka Chamber of Commerce and Industry (1979–1982).
