= SK Azizul Bari Helal =

Bangladeshi politician

- এস কে আজিজুল বারী হেলাল

Member of the Bangladesh Parliament for Khulna-4
- Incumbent
- Assumed office 17 February 2026
- Preceded by: Abdus Salam Murshedy

Personal details
- Party: Bangladesh Nationalist Party
- Education: University of Dhaka
- Occupation: Politician

SK Azizul Bari Helal is a Bangladeshi politician who, in February 2026, became the member of parliament for Khulna-4. He is a member of the Bangladesh Nationalist Party (BNP), having gotten his start in politics with their student wing, the Jatiyatabadi Chhatra Dal (JCD). He was the JCD's general secretary from 2003 to 2005 and president from 2005 to 2009.

While the BNP was out of government, Helal led anti-government protests. He was charged in over 100 cases of political violence. He was the BNP's candidate for the seat of Dhaka-18 in 2008 and for Khulna-4 in 2018.

== Biography ==
=== Education ===
Helal was admitted to the University of Dhaka in 1985. There he completed a bachelor's degree in soil science.

=== Career ===
Helal was made general secretary of the Jatiyatabadi Chhatra Dal (JCD), the student wing of the Bangladesh Nationalist Party (BNP), in January 2003. He became president of the JCD in January 2005.

The 2006–2008 political crisis started under the caretaker government of Iajuddin Ahmed. He announced a general election for 22 January 2007. The BNP selected Helal as their candidate for Khulna-4. The choice angered top leaders in the local BNP, who instead wanted Majedul Islam, the party's publication secretary. The Awami League declared a boycott, the military stepped in, and the election was cancelled. During the crisis, Helal led protests that clashed with police and resulted in his arrest under emergency power rules.

A new caretaker government led by Fakhruddin Ahmed called a general election for 29 December 2008. Helal was nominated as the BNP's candidate for Dhaka-18. It was a new seat created when the Election Commission redrew constituency boundaries to reflect population changes revealed by the 2001 Bangladesh census. Helal came second, behind Awami League candidate Sahara Khatun, with 116,786 votes, 34.9% of those cast. Nationally, the Awami League-led Grand Alliance won a commanding victory, and Sheikh Hasina formed a new government.

Helal continued as president of the JCD until July 2009. He continued to lead protests against the government and was arrested. Charges ranged from obstructing police, subversion, and arson to attempted murder. By January 2018, he was the information affairs secretary of the BNP. In December there were more than 100 pending cases against him.

The BNP selected Helal as their candidate for the Khulna-4 constituency in the 2018 general election. He finished second behind incumbent Awami League member of parliament Abdus Salam Murshedy, receiving 14,187 votes, 5.8% of those cast.

In April 2023, Helal was jailed in a sabotage case. In November, he was convicted of having held an illegal rally in January 2015 and sentenced to six months in prison. The BNP's legal affairs secretary said the cases were politically motivated. He said, "BNP leaders and activists are being convicted one after another ... to make BNP leaders ineligible for the upcoming general elections". According to Aaqib Md. Shatil, writing in The Diplomat, authorities used the legal system to make sure Helal and other BNP leaders could not run in the 2024 general election. They were detained before the election was announced and kept in custody until after the filing deadline for candidates had passed. On 29 November, the day before the close of nominations, the BNP announced that it was boycotting the election.

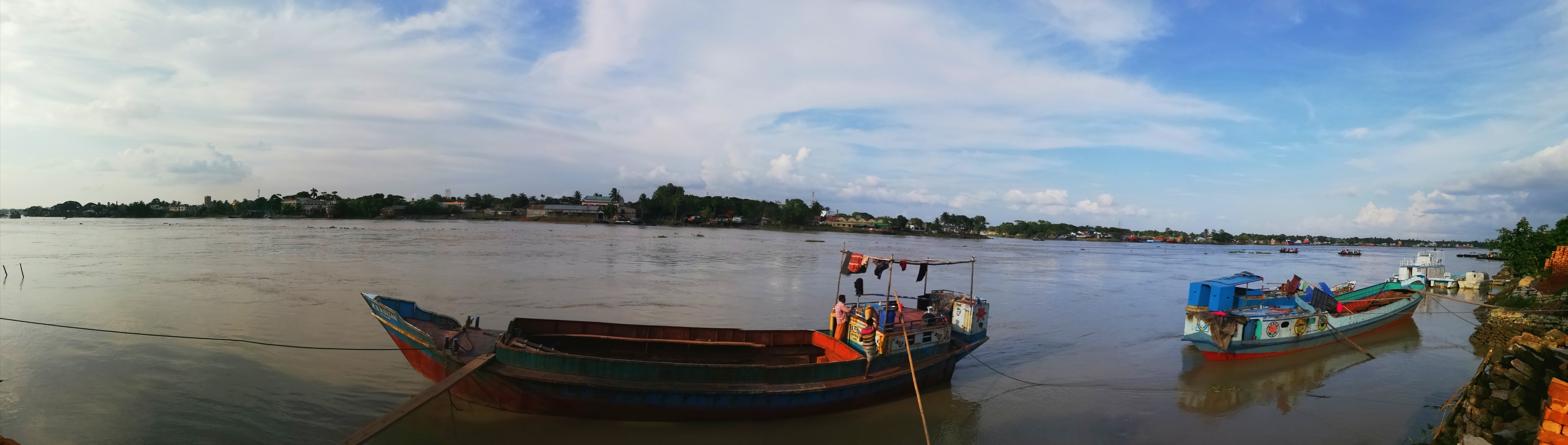
The Bhairab River separates the rural Khulna-4 constituency from the city of Khulna.

When the interim government of Muhammad Yunus called a general election for February 2026, Helal was nominated as the BNP's candidate for Khulna-4. He ran on a 74-point platform that emphasized major infrastructure projects to develop the constituency. He pledged to build a second bridge across the Bhairab River to ease connection to the district headquarters, Khulna. He also promised to fast-track completion of the Nagarghat and Railgate bridges and build river embankments to protect against erosion. Helal was elected with a majority of 13,632.
