= Nurul Qadir Junu =

Bangladeshi politician

Member of Bangladesh Parliament
- In office 1973–1976

Personal details
- Political party: Awami League

Nurul Qadir Junu (Bengali: নুরুল কাদীর জুনু) is an Awami League politician in Bangladesh and a former member of parliament for Faridpur-10.

== Career ==
Junu was elected to parliament from Faridpur-10 as an Awami League candidate in 1973.
