= Abdus Salam Murshedy =

Bangladeshi politician

- আব্দুস সালাম মুর্শেদী
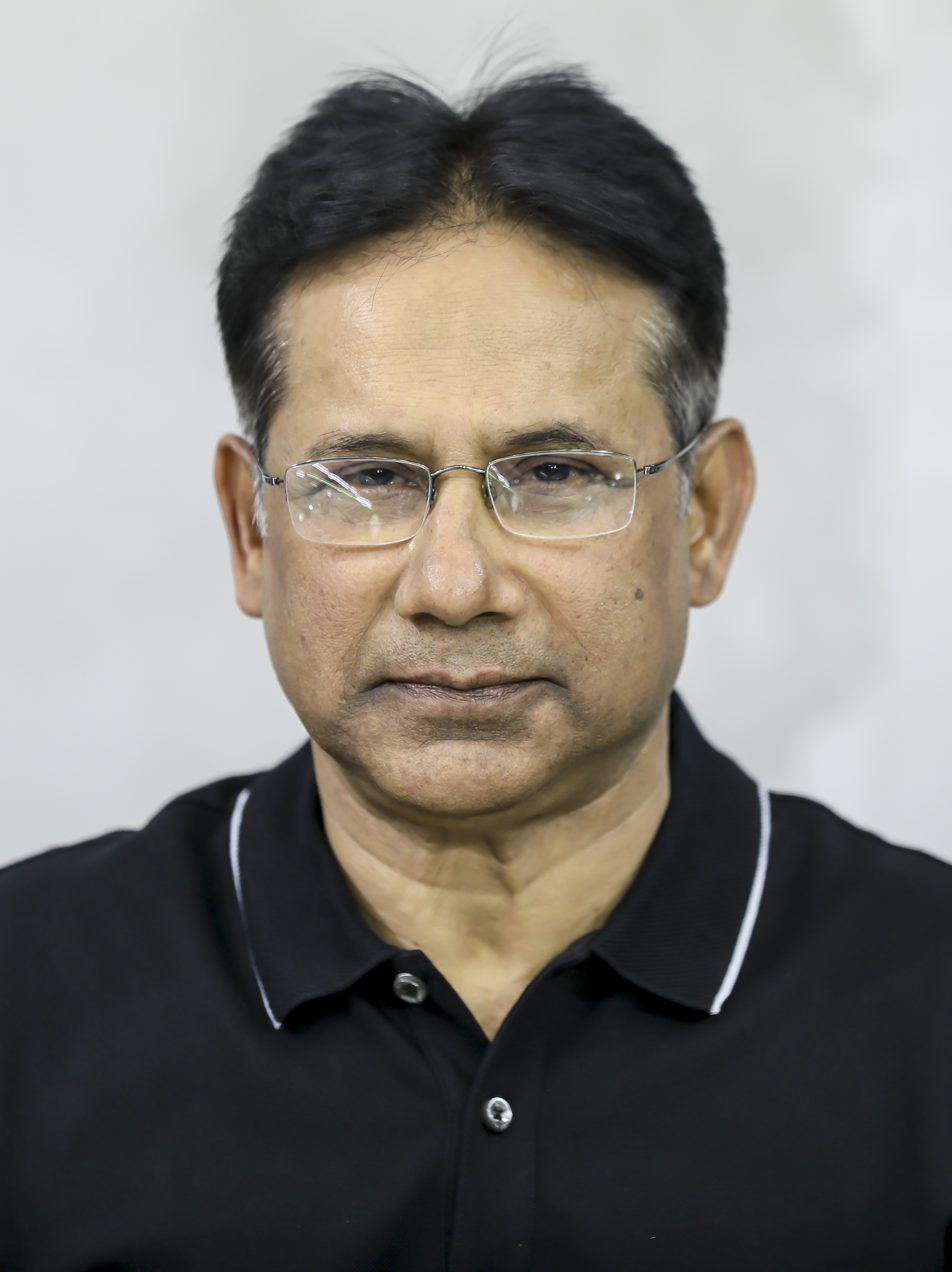
- Murshedy in 2018

Member of the Bangladesh Parliament for Khulna-4
- In office 4 September 2018 – 6 August 2024
- Preceded by: Mostafa Rashidi Suja
- Succeeded by: SK Azizul Bari Helal

Personal details
- Born: 6 October 1963 (age 63) Khulna District, East Pakistan, Pakistan
- Party: Bangladesh Awami League
- Spouse: Sharmin Salam
- Children: 3
- Parents: Mohammad Israel (father); Rizia Khatun (mother)
- Occupation: Business
- Known for: Football player, businessman, politician
- Awards: National Sports Awards (2003)
Association football career
- Position: Forward
Senior career*
Years	Team	Apps	(Gls)
1977–1978	Azad Sporting Club		
1979	Team BJMC		
1980–1991	Mohammedan SC		
International career
1978	Bangladesh U19		
1979–1985	Bangladesh		
- * Club domestic league appearances and goals

Abdus Salam Murshedy (born 6 October 1963) is a Bangladeshi politician, entrepreneur and former national team football player. He is a member of Bangladesh Awami League and a former Jatiya Sangsad member representing the Khulna-4 constituency during 2018–2024. He is a director of Envoy Group, former senior vice president of Bangladesh Football Federation former President of Exporters Association of Bangladesh and former president of Bangladesh Garment Manufacturers and Exporters Association (BGMEA). He has been elected as a Commercially Important Person (CIP) by the government of Bangladesh in 2014.

== Early life and education ==
Murshedy was born in Rupsa Upazila, Khulna District to Mohammad Israel (d. 1988) and mother Rizia Khatun. He came from a Khulna family with a very strong connection with sports. His eldest brother Jamal Haider represented East Pakistan in volleyball before 1971. Abul Kalam Azad, the third brother was for a long time the body building champion of Bangladesh in the late 1970s and early 1980s.

== Domestic football ==
Murshedy was a highly successful center forward in football. In the '70s, he started his journey with football by playing for Young Boys Club of Khulna. He came to Dhaka from Khulna in the late seventies. At that time, he started playing in Dhaka First Division League for Azad Sporting Club. In 1979 he played for BJMC and helped them win the league title.

Murshedy joined the Mohammedan Sporting Club (MSC), Dhaka in 1980. With them he won league titles in 1980 and 1982 and 4 successive Federation Cup title starting from 1980. In 1981 he scored 4 goals in the Super League match against Wari Club. Skipper Badal Roy scored the other two goals as MSC won 6–0.

1982 saw Murshedy reach the pick of his career. He contributed to MSC's first title win in foreign soil, scoring 10 goals during the Ashish Jabbar football tournament in Durgapur, India. Then in the First Division League he created a new record scoring 27 goals in a season. The record still exists. Throughout the season he had a wonderful understanding with No.10 Badal Roy.

That year, with goals in the First Division, Federation Cup and in India, Salam scored a total of 40 goals in all competitions. During his seven years with The Black and Whites, Salam scored a total of 74 league goals.

But Murshedy suffered a bad hand injury in 1983, and although he returned to football within a few months, he was never the same player again.

== International football ==
In December 1980, Murshedy played for the Bangladesh U-19 team in Dacca. He partnered Sheikh Mohammad Aslam of BJMC in the forward line. Bangladesh finished runners up behind Qatar and thus qualified for the main event.

In early 1981, the youth team, now called the Bangladesh (Red) team reached the finals of the first President's Cup in Dacca. But they lost the final to a South Korean team. During the 1982 Quaid-e-Azam International Tournament, Murshedy scored for Bangladesh against Pakistan Youth team in 1–2 loss. Salam suffered a serious hand injury while playing against Malaysia for the Bangladesh (Green) team in 1983, and this affected his prospects in international football.

== Business ==
Murshedy is the managing director of Envoy Group. Besides, he is the director of Premier Bank Limited. He started Envoy Garment's journey in 1984. Later he made 15 more ready-made garment companies. He is currently the president of Bangladesh Exporters Association (EAB), senior vice president of Bangladesh Football Federation, member of the board of directors of BGMEA Institute of Fashion & Technology. Earlier, he was appointed as the president of Bangladesh Garment Manufacturers and Exporters Association (BGMEA) and director of Mohammedan Sporting Club.

== Politics ==
On 7 January 2024, Murshedy was elected to parliament from Khulna-4 as a candidate of the Awami League.

In March 2024, High Court of Bangladesh directed Murshedy to hand over an abandoned Gulshan property to the government alleging him of occupying it illegally. At the aftermath of the fall of the Sheikh Hasina led Awami League government in August, Murshedy was arrested and sent to jail in October 2024 in a case over the death of Rubel, a garment worker, in the Dhaka's Adabor area during the 2024 Bangladesh quota reform movement.

== Personal life ==
Murshedy is married to Sharmin Salam. They have a daughter, Barrister Shehrin Salam Oishee, and two sons including Ishmam Salam.

== Awards ==
- National Sports Awards, 2013
- Kar Bahadur Paribar, 2017
