= Zeba Islam Seraj =

Bangladeshi biochemist

- জেবা ইসলাম সেরাজ
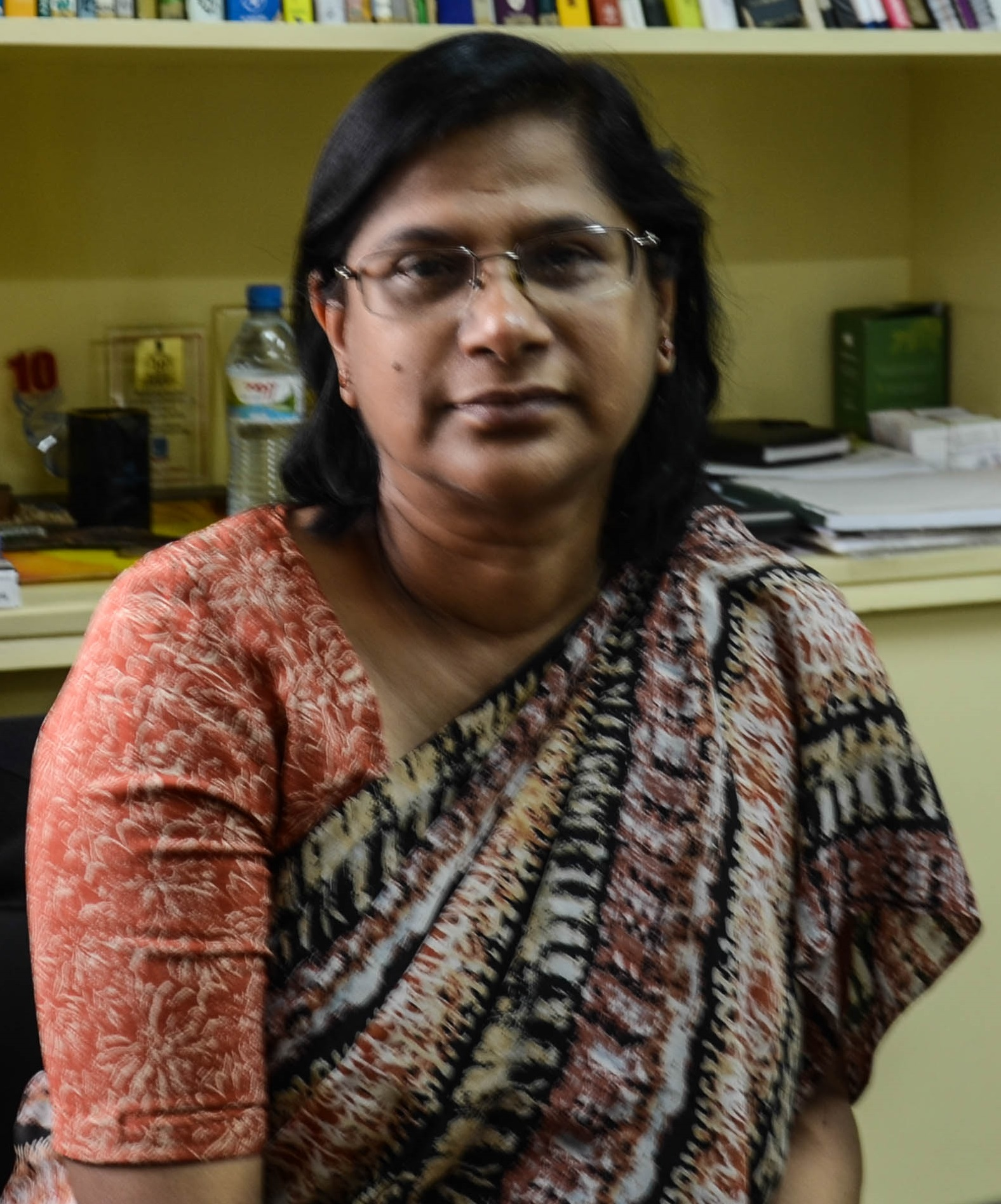
- Seraj in 2015
- Born: Dhaka
- Known for: Rice research
- Awards: Anannya Top Ten Awards (2016)
- Scientific career
- Fields: Biotechnology and Molecular Biology
- Workplaces: University of Dhaka

Zeba Islam Seraj is a Bangladeshi scientist known for her research in developing salt-tolerant rice varieties suitable for growth in the coastal areas of Bangladesh. She is currently a professor at the Department of Biochemistry and Molecular Biology, University of Dhaka.

== Academic career ==
Seraj studied at the University of Dhaka, Bangladesh, obtaining a B.Sc. in 1980. She completed her M.Sc. from the same university in 1982. She obtained her PhD in biochemistry from University of Glasgow in 1986 and went to University of Liverpool for post-doctoral work the following year. After completing her post-doc., she joined the Department of Biochemistry and Molecular Biology, University of Dhaka in 1988. She became an associate professor in 1991 and a professor in 1997 at the same university. She has been supervising plant biotechnology projects funded by foreign and local grants as a principal investigator since 1991. She is a visiting researcher with UT Austin since 2013.

== Research activities ==
Seraj has established a well-equipped plant biotechnology laboratory at the University of Dhaka. She has been a co-principal investigator in several projects, such as the Generation Challenge Program (GCP)—an initiative to use molecular biology to help boost agricultural production. Seraj has not only worked on fine mapping of the major QTLs for salinity tolerance in Pokkali, but also characterized traditional rice landraces with the aim of finding genetic loci responsible for salt tolerance and applying markers linked to these loci to aid breeding programs for incorporation of salinity tolerance in rice. She also works on developing genetically modified rice varieties with improved salt tolerance suitable for growing in the coastal region of Bangladesh. She was the recipient of the PEER award (joint USAID-NSF initiative) for using next generation sequencing technologies to find the basis of salt tolerance of a rice landrace endemic to the Bangladesh coast, where University of Texas at Austin served as the host for collaborative work.

Seraj has been a visiting scientist in PBGB, IRRI (Constructs for salinity tolerance with Dr. John Bennett Jan-March 1998), PBGB & CSWS Division, IRRI (IRRI-PETRRA Bangladesh project on development of MV rice for the coastal wetlands of Bangladesh, June 11–29, 2002 and June 16–20, 2003), USDA research station at Beaumont, Texas, USA (Aug. 4–16, 2003) and at the Department of Molecular, Cell and Developmental Biology, University of Texas, Austin, USA as Norman Borlaug Fellow (August 15–December 15, 2005). She has been honored with Visiting researcher status at University of Texas at Austin (October 2014–September 2020). She was awarded the Annanya Award, 2017 for her scientific research. She was invited for a Tedx talk on how to save crops from sea level rise and salinity (Jan 16, 2018). She was featured in NHK TV, Japan in a talk on Science for Sustainable Earth in 2019.

== Personal life ==
Zeba was married to Toufiq M Seraj, a Bangladeshi businessman who was the founder and managing director of Sheltech. He passed away in 2019. They have two daughters.

== Awards ==
- Anannya Top Ten Awards (2016)
