= Sheikh Shahidur Rahman =

Bangladeshi politician (died 2021)

- শেখ সহিদুর রহমান

Member of Parliament from Khulna-4
- In office 1986–1988
- Preceded by: A. Latif Khan
- Succeeded by: Moktar Hossain

Personal details
- Born: 1950 or 1951 Pakistan
- Died: 22 August 2021 (aged 70) Khulna
- Party: Workers Party of Bangladesh

Sheikh Shahidur Rahman (1950/1 – 22 August 2021) was a Bangladeshi politician affiliated with the Workers Party of Bangladesh who served the Khulna-4 constituency as a member of the Jatiya Sangsad from 1986 to 1988.

== Biography ==
Sheikh Shahidur Rahman was born in Khulna District. Sheikh Shahidur Rahman was elected to parliament from Khulna-4 as a Workers Party of Bangladesh candidate in 1986. He was the president of the Khulna District Workers Party. Rahman died on 22 August 2021 in Khulna, Bangladesh due to a heart attack at the age of 70.
