= Sazzad Hossain (professor) =

Prof. Dr. Sazzad Hossain
- প্রফেসর ডঃ সাজ্জাদ হোসেন
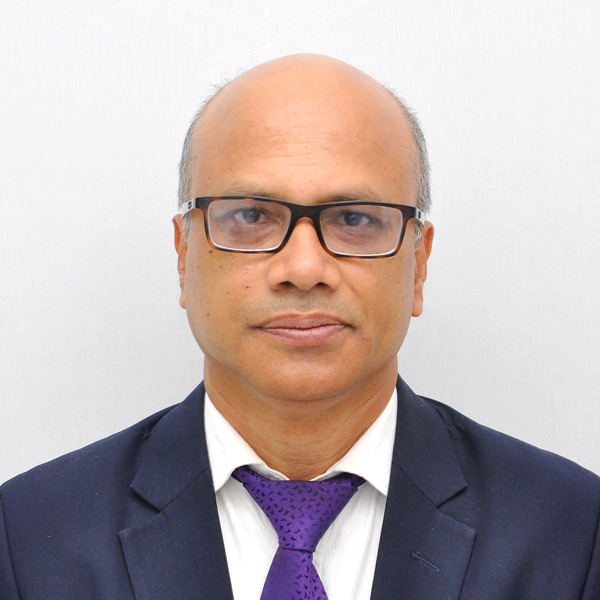
- Born: Chattogram, Bangladesh
- Citizenship: Bangladesh
- Education: Portland State University; Moscow Power Engineering Institute
- Known for: Quantum Circuit Optimization, National STEAM Olympiad, IC4IR conference
- Awards: National Digital Transformation Award
- Scientific career
- Fields: Quantum computing, Artificial intelligence, Cybersecurity, Internet of Things, Robotics, Digital transformation
- Workplaces: Samarkand State University; University Grants Commission (Bangladesh); University of Liberal Arts Bangladesh
- Doctoral advisor: Marek A. Perkowski
- Website: www.professorsazzad.com

Sazzad Hossain (Bengali: সাজ্জাদ হোসেন) is a Bangladeshi academic and researcher specializing in quantum computing, artificial intelligence, cybersecurity, Internet of Things (IoT), robotics, and digital transformation. He is a professor in the Faculty of Artificial Intelligence and Digital Technologies at Samarkand State University in Uzbekistan. He previously served as a member of the University Grants Commission (UGC) of Bangladesh and as an independent director of Bangladesh Satellite Company Limited (BSCL).

Hossain has more than 30 years of experience in higher education, research, and national policy. He has organized international conferences and contributed to STEAM education initiatives in Bangladesh. He has authored or co-edited several books and over 100 peer-reviewed papers, with more than 2,013 citations (h-index 24, i10-index 44 as of 2026).

== Early life and education ==
Hossain was born in Chattogram, Bangladesh. He completed his Secondary School Certificate from Faujdarhat Cadet College (1984) and Higher Secondary Certificate from Chittagong College (1986). He studied Bachelor of Science in Electrical and Electronics Engineering at Chittagong University of Engineering & Technology (1986 to 1991). He then moved to Russia and earned a B.Sc. in Electrical System Network Engineering from Moscow Power Engineering Institute (1994). He obtained an M.Sc. (2001) and Ph.D. (2009) in Electrical and Computer Engineering from Portland State University, Oregon, USA. His doctoral dissertation, supervised by Marek A. Perkowski, addressed classical and quantum search algorithms for quantum circuit synthesis and oracle optimization.

== Career ==
Hossain began his academic career with adjunct teaching and research roles at Independent University, Bangladesh, and Portland State University (2001–2009). He served as Professor and Head of the Department of Computer Science and Engineering at the University of Liberal Arts Bangladesh (ULAB) from November 2009 to June 2019.

Hossain was appointed a Member of the University Grants Commission (UGC) of Bangladesh in June 2019 and was reappointed for a second four-year term by the Ministry of Education in June 2023. During his tenure, he led the Research and Development Division and the Information Management, Communication & Training Division, contributing to higher education policy, digital transformation, and research capacity building.

In July 2019, while serving as UGC Member, Hossain was nominated as Independent Director of the Board of Directors of Bangladesh Satellite Company Limited (BCSCL/BSCL). He served in that role from August 2019 to August 2024.

Hossain was Professor and Head of the Department of International Education Development at Moscow Financial and Industrial University «Synergy» in Moscow, Russia, from October 2024 to March 2025. Since February 2025, he has been working as a Professor in the Faculty of Artificial Intelligence and Digital Technologies at Samarkand State University named after Sharof Rashidov in Samarkand, Uzbekistan, where he leads research programs in AI, quantum computing, IoT, and cybersecurity, and organizes international events such as the Quantum Computing Summer School 2025 and the 5th International Conference on Trends in Electronics and Health Informatics (TEHI 2025).

Hossain has served as an advisor to PeopleNTech, a USA-based company. He was the convenor and chief advisor of the National STEAM Olympiad.

== Research ==
Hossain's primary research interests include quantum computing, artificial intelligence (including explainable AI), cybersecurity, cryptography, IoT security, robotics, and digital transformation. He has co-authored recent papers on lightweight IoT–edge intrusion detection systems, AI-Augmented federated learning, quantum-enhanced multimodal systems for healthcare and memory-optimized generative AI models.

He is a life fellow of the Institution of Engineers Bangladesh (IEB) and holds senior memberships in IEEE and ACM.

Notable recent publications include: Rahman, Md. Mushfiqur; Hossain, Sazzad (2026). "Federated learning and AI-based ZTA for security, privacy, telemetry, IAM and fileless malware detection and prevention framework: an in-depth review". International Journal of Data Science and Analytics. 22 (283): 300. doi:10.1007/s41060-026-01254-y.

Islam, Md Manirul; Salsabil, Umme; Nurmamatov, Mekhriddin; Hossain, Sazzad (2026). "Lightweight Intrusion Detection Systems for IoT–Edge Environments: A PRISMA-ScR Systematic Review of Deployability Evidence and a Unified Assessment Framework". Future Internet. 18 (6): 300. doi:10.3390/fi18060300.

Rahman, Md. Mushfiqur; Hossain, Sazzad (2026). "AI-Augmented Federated Learning: A Predictive Framework for Detecting and Real-Time Correlation of IAM, Network Telemetry, and Endpoint Events for Preventing Lateral Movement Attacks". Scientific Culture. 12 (4): 8369–8382.

Gupta, Sandeep; Ray, Kanad; Kaiser, Shamim; Hossain, Sazzad; Faubert, Jocelyn (2026). "Quantum-Enhanced Multimodal Fusion Networks for Integrated Cancer Diagnosis: Combining CT, Genomics, and Clinical Records". Algorithms. 19 (4): 279. doi:10.3390/a19040279.

Gupta, Sandeep; Ray, Kanad; Kaiser, Shamim; Hossain, Sazzad; Faubert, Jocelyn (2026). "Enhanced Facial Realism in Personalized Diffusion Models: A Memory-Optimized DreamBooth Implementation for Consumer Hardware". Algorithms. 19 (4): 257. doi:10.3390/a19040257.
