= Bagerhat District Stadium =

- Bagerhat Stadium; Sheikh Helal Uddin Stadium
- Interactive map of Bagerhat District Stadium
- Location: Nager Bazar Stadium Road, Bagerhat, Bangladesh
- Coordinates: 22°39′14.99″N 89°47′44.02″E
- Owner: National Sports Council
- Operator: National Sports Council
- Surface: Grass
- Field size: 125 × 125 m (410 × 410 ft)

Tenants
- Bagerhat Cricket Team; Bagerhat Football Team

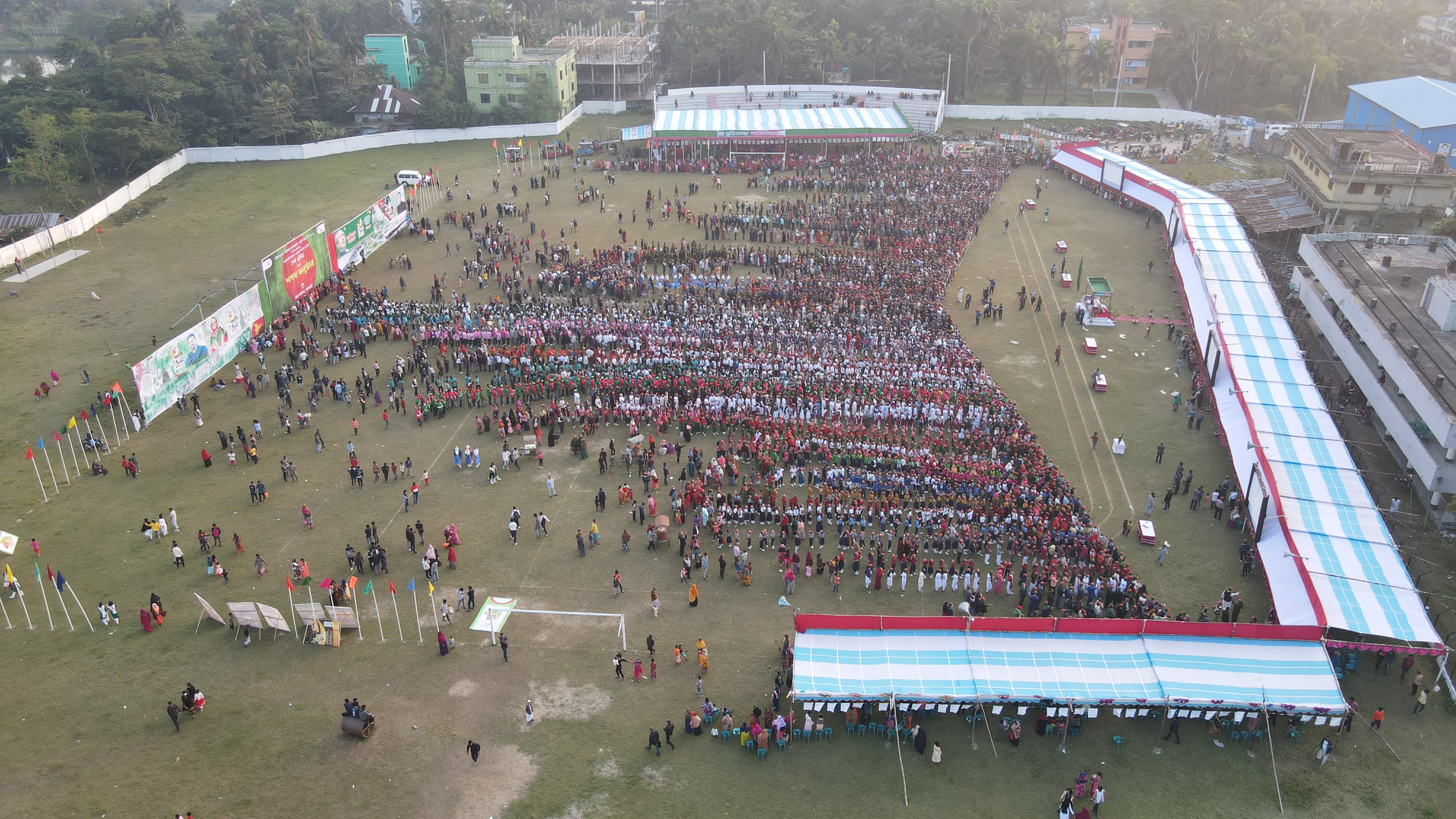
Bagerhat stadium

Bagerhat District Stadium (formerly known as Sheikh Helal Uddin Stadium) is a multi-purpose stadium in Bagerhat, Bangladesh.

== See also ==
- Stadiums in Bangladesh
- List of cricket grounds in Bangladesh
