= Hafiz Ahmad Choudhury =

Bangladeshi politician

Minister of Power, Energy and Mineral Resources
- In office April 1972 – June 1974

Personal details
- Party: Bangladesh Awami League

Hafiz Ahmad Choudhury is a Bangladesh Awami League politician and the former Minister of Power, Energy and Mineral Resources from April 1972 to June 1974.
