= Molla Jalal Uddin =

Bangladeshi politician

Member of Bangladesh Parliament

Personal details
- Born: 12 March 1946 (age 79)
- Party: Bangladesh Awami League

Molla Jalal Uddin (born 1946) is a Bangladesh Awami League politician and a former member of parliament for Khulna-4.

== Career ==
Uddin was elected to parliament from Khulna-4 as a Bangladesh Awami League candidate in 2008.
