= Muhammad Sohrab Hossain =

Bangladeshi politician

Minister of Fisheries and Livestock
- In office April 1972 – March 1973

Minister of Public Works and Housing
- In office March 1973 – January 1975

Personal details
- Born: Magura
- Died: 26 January 1998
- Party: Bangladesh Awami League

Muhammad Sohrab Hossain (died 1998) was a Bangladesh Awami League politician.

Former and only MNA from Magura, former and first ever MP from Magura 1, former and first ever Minister of Bangladesh from Magura (1972 -1975), one of the founding fathers of Bangladesh.
