= Real Estate and Housing Association of Bangladesh =

- Abbreviation: REHAB
- Formation: 1991
- Founder: Amjad Khan Chowdhury
- Headquarters: Dhaka, Bangladesh
- Location: National Plaza (5th & 6th Floor), 1/G, Free School, Street, Sonargaon Road, Dhaka -1205.
- Region served: Bangladesh
- Members: 930 (as of 2026)
- President: Dr. Ali Afzal
- Vice-President: Abdur Razzaque
- Website: www.rehab-bd.org

Real Estate and Housing Association of Bangladesh is a real estate trade body in Bangladesh. Dr. Ali Afzal is president of REHAB for 2026–2028.

== History ==
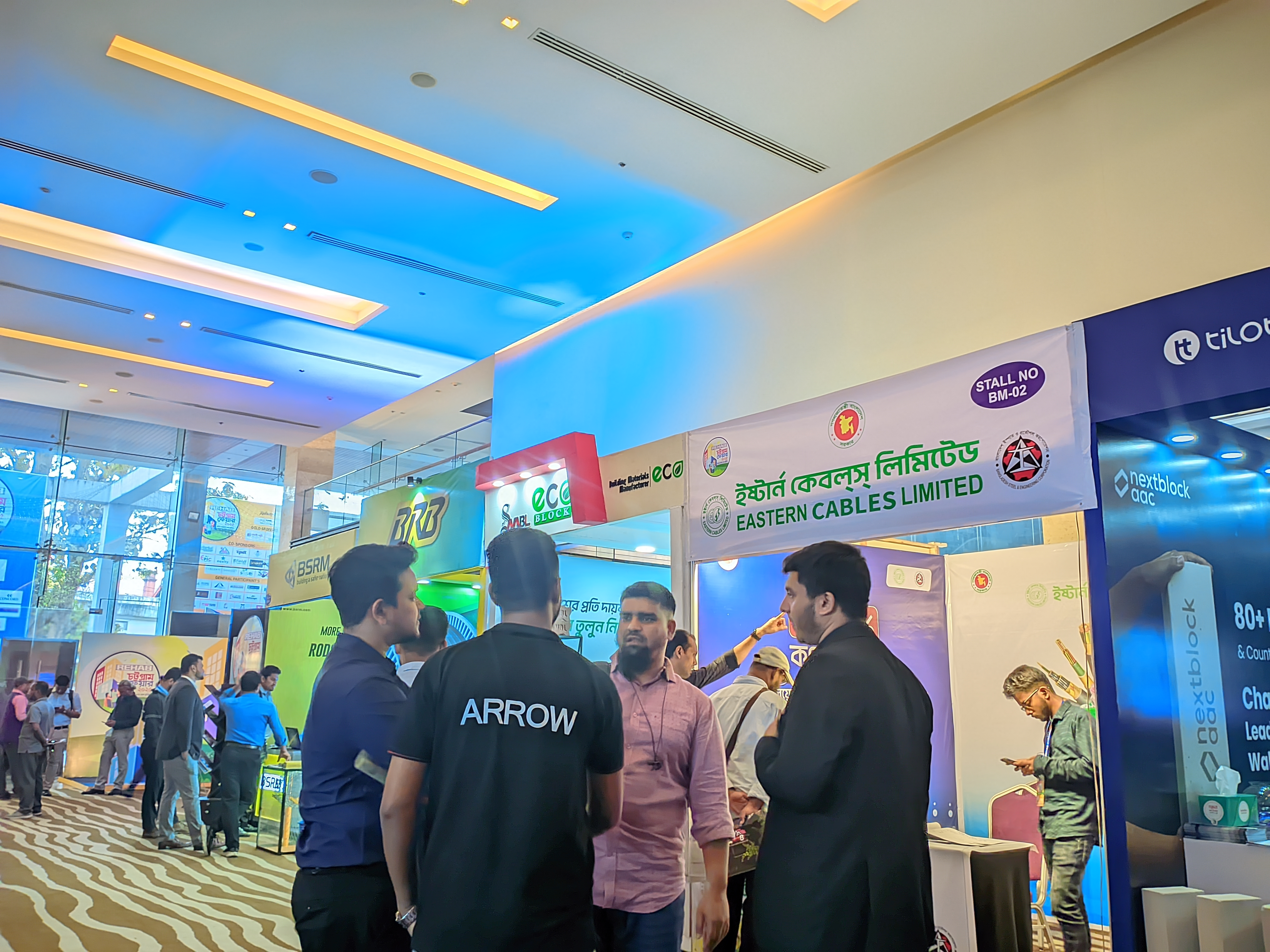
REHAB Chattogram Fair-2025

In Bangladesh, only five corporations were active in the real estate market in the 1970s, with most of their attention going into Dhaka's residential growth. In the market by 1988, 42 distinct developers were active. REHAB was founded in 1991 by eleven of Bangladesh's largest real estate companies to protect one another's interests and the sector as a whole. Maj. Gen.Amjad Khan Chowdhury, psc (Retd.), who was the Convener to setup REHAB as well as Brig. Gen. (Retd.) A. H. M. Abdul Momen, who led the Association as Founder President for over 7 years. It holds real estate fairs in Dhaka and Chittagong. REHAB is A Class member of the Federation of Bangladesh Chambers of Commerce and Industry (FBCCI). Today, the sector has transformed into one of the country’s most dynamic industries, contributing nearly 15% to the national GDP
