= Phani Bhushan Majumder =

Bengali politician

- Born: 1901
- Died: 31 October 1981 (aged 79–80)
- Title: Ministry of Information
- Political party: Bangladesh Awami League

Phani Bhushan Majumder was an Awami League politician and a former minister of the government of Bangladesh.

== Early life ==
Phani Bhushan Majumder was born in 1901 at village Sendia in Rajoir Upazila of Madaripur. His father's name was Satish Chandra Majumdar. He studied in Madaripur high School, then went on to Bankura College and Vidyasagar College in Kolkata. He studied law in Ripon College, Kolkata.

== Career ==
In 1919 he joined the Biplobi party. In 1925 he joined the Madaripur Peace Force. From 1930 to 1938 he was imprisoned for his political activities. He was a devoted follower of Subhas Chandra Bose. He along with Bose tried to remove Holwell Monument from Kolkata and was arrested for it in 1940. He was released from jail in 1946.

In 1948 he founded Madaripur Subdivision Weavers' Cooperative Society. For his role in the Bengali language movement he was arrested multiple times including 1948 and from 1949 to 1953. He spent time in jail with Sheikh Mujibur Rahman in Gopalganj. Since 1949 he was part of Awami Muslim League. In 1954 he was elected to the provincial assembly from Madaripur-Gopalganj constituency. He was a candidate of the United Front. In 1958 martial law was promulgated and he was arrested and released in 1962. He was arrested in 1965 under the Pakistan Security Act. During the East Pakistan mass-movement of 1969 he was released from jail.

He was elected to the East Pakistan Provincial Assembly from the Awami League in 1970. During Bangladesh Liberation war he was the chairman of the regional council for south-western region-2. During the war he campaigned in India to gain public favor for Bangladesh and spoke in the parliament of India.

In 1972, he was made the Minister of Food in the cabinet of Sheikh Mujibur Rahman. He was elected to the parliament of Bangladesh in 1973 as a candidate of Awami League. He continued as the Food Minister. He would also be the Minister of Land Administration and Land Reforms. After the assassination of Sheikh Mujib he was forced to become minister in the cabinet of Khondakar Mostaq Ahmad and was made the minister of Local Government, Rural Development and Cooperatives. In 1977 he was arrested under martial law. In 1979 he returned to parliament as a candidate of Awami League.

== Death ==
He died on 31 October 1981.
