= Mizanur Rahman Chowdhury =

Prime Minister of Bangladesh from 1986 to 1988

- মিজানুর রহমান চৌধুরী
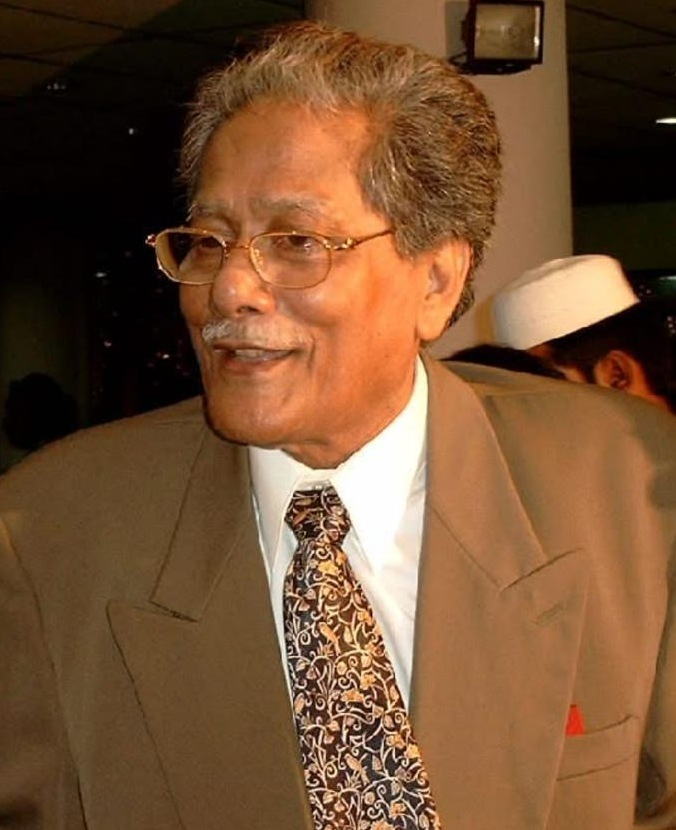
- Mizanur Rahman Chowdhury in 2003

6th Prime Minister of Bangladesh
- In office 9 July 1986 – 27 March 1988
- President: Hossain Mohammad Ershad
- Deputy: M.A. Matin; Kazi Zafar Ahmed; Moudud Ahmed; Shah Moazzem Hossain
- Preceded by: Ataur Rahman Khan
- Succeeded by: Moudud Ahmed

Minister of Posts, Telecommunications and Information Technology
- In office 25 May 1986 – 27 March 1988
- Preceded by: Sultan Ahmed
- Succeeded by: Iqbal Hossain Chowdhury

Minister of Disaster Management and relief
- In office 16 March 1973 – 17 May 1973
- Preceded by: Abul Hasnat Muhammad Qamaruzzaman
- Succeeded by: Muhammad Sohrab Hossain

Minister of Information and Broadcasting
- In office 13 April 1972 – 16 March 1973
- Preceded by: Sheikh Mujibur Rahman
- Succeeded by: Sheikh Abdul Aziz

Member of Parliament
- In office 12 September 1991 – 24 November 1995
- Preceded by: Mohammad Harij Uddin Sarker
- Succeeded by: H. N. Ashequr Rahman
- Constituency: Rangpur-5
- In office 3 March 1988 – 6 December 1990
- Preceded by: Himself
- Succeeded by: Mohammad Abdullah
- Constituency: Chandpur-4
- In office 7 May 1986 – 3 March 1988
- Preceded by: Position Established
- Succeeded by: Himself
- Constituency: Chandpur-4
- In office 18 February 1979 – 24 March 1982
- Preceded by: Abu Jafar Mohammad Moinuddin
- Succeeded by: Position Abolished
- Constituency: Comilla-22
- In office 7 March 1973 – 6 November 1975
- Preceded by: Position Established
- Succeeded by: Abdul Mannan
- Constituency: Comilla-24

Member of Constituent Assembly of Bangladesh
- In office 10 April 1972 – 16 December 1972
- Preceded by: Position Established
- Succeeded by: Position Abolished
- Constituency: Comilla-14

Member of National Assembly of Pakistan
- In office 12 June 1965 – 25 March 1969
- Preceded by: Himself
- Succeeded by: Position Abolished
- Constituency: NE-65 (Comilla-V)
- In office 8 June 1962 – 7 June 1965
- Succeeded by: Himself
- Constituency: NE-65 (Comilla-V)

Personal details
- Born: 19 October 1928 Tippera District, Bengal, British India
- Died: 2 February 2006 (aged 77) Dhaka, Bangladesh
- Party: AL (1971–1978, 2001–2006)
- Other political affiliations: JP (Manju) (1999–2001); JaPa (1984–1999); AL (Mizan) (1978–1984); PAL (1949–1971)

Mizanur Rahman Chowdhury (Bengali: মিজানুর রহমান চৌধুরী; 19 October 1928 – 2 February 2006) was a Bengali politician, most notable for serving as Prime Minister of Bangladesh from 9 July 1986, to 27 March 1988.

== Early life ==
Chowdhury was born on 19 October 1928 in present-day Chandpur District, Bangladesh to Muhammad Hafiz Chowdhury and Mahmuda Chowdhury. In college, he was involved in student politics. He went to high school in Nuria High Madrasa and went to graduate from Feni College in 1952. He was the headmaster of Bamni Junior High School in Noakhali district. He was selected to join the Provincial Public Service Commission and started in government service. He started Nuria High Madrasa in Chandpur as an English teacher after resigning government service.

== Early Political Career (1944-1970) ==
In 1944, Mizanur Rahman Chowdhury entered politics by joining the All Bengal Muslim Student League. In 1945 he was elected president of Comilla district unit of All India Muslim Students Federation. In 1946 he was made the Captain of Muslim League Volunteer Corps. He would go on to be elected the general secretary of Chandpur Muslim Chhatra League students union of Chandpur College in 1948, two years later he was elected as general secretary of Feni College students union. He was involved in the 1952 Bengali language movement.

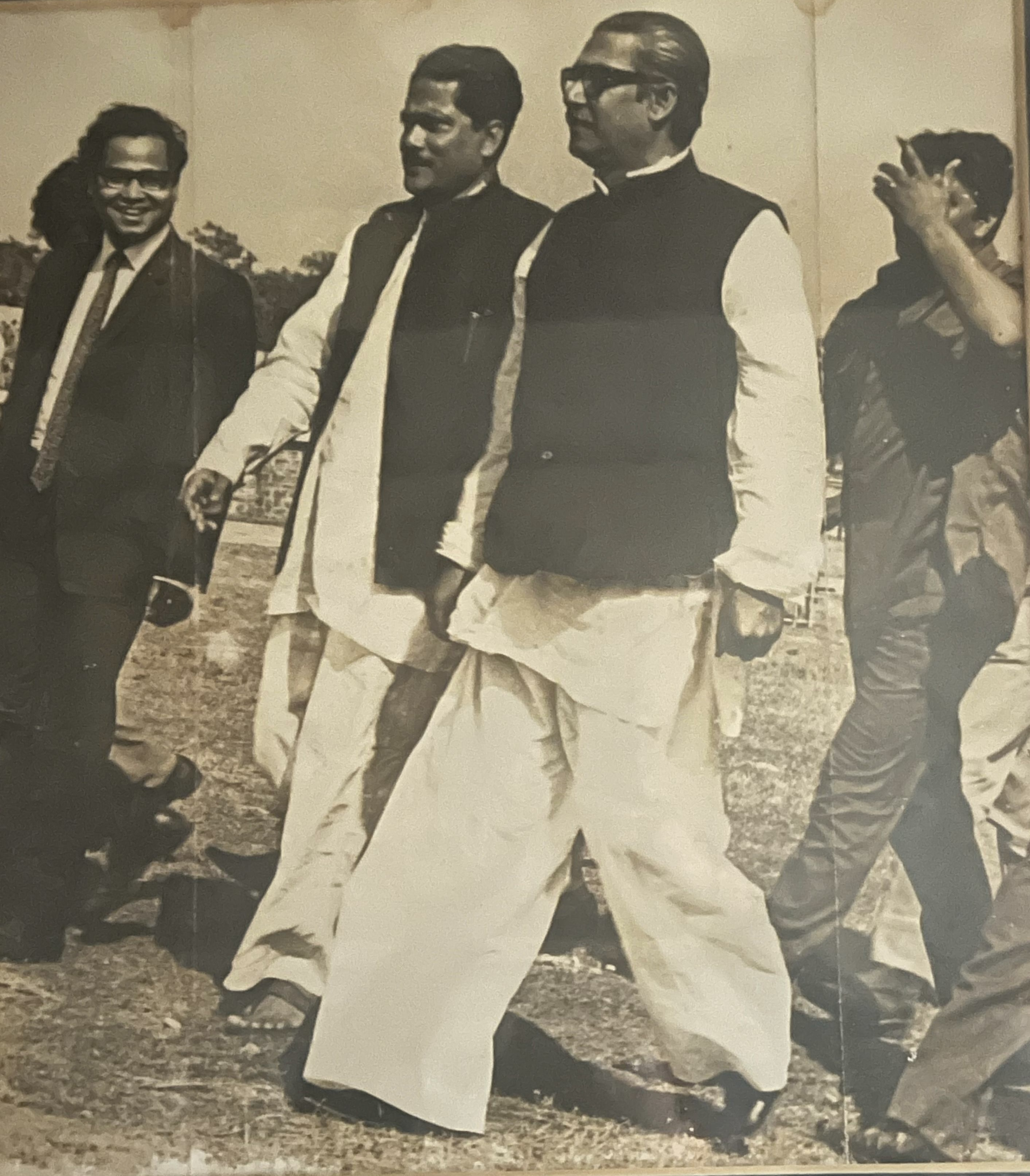
Sheikh Mujibur Rahman and Mizanur Rahman Chowdhury in 1971

In 1959 he was elected vice chairman of Chandpur Municipality. In 1962, he was elected to the National Assembly of Pakistan from Comilla-V. In December 1964 he was arrested under the Public Safety Ordinance of Pakistan. He was released before the National Assembly election and went on to be elected again in the assembly from the same Constituency in 1965. In 1966 he was elected to the post of organising secretary of East Pakistan Awami League and later was made the acting general secretary. He helped organize the 6-Point Movement. He was chief organising convenor of the Six point movement. On 22 June 1966 he was arrested under Defense of Pakistan Rules. In 1967 released by the order of the Supreme Court. In 1968 was made the convenor of the combined opposition party (COP). In 1969 he helped organize the mass uprising. In the 1970 Pakistani general election he was elected to the National Assembly of Pakistan from Comilla-V for the third consecutive time.

== Liberation War of Bangladesh ==
He was in Chandpur on 25 March 1971. On 30 March 1971, he went with Malek Ukil others to Agartala, Tripura, India to organize the Awami League during the War. Later on 9 April he went to Kolkata. In Kolkata he met Tajuddin Ahmad, A H M Qamaruzzaman, Syed Nazrul Islam, Muhammad Mansur Ali and other senior leaders and worked as a political motivator. During the Liberation War of Bangladesh he worked to motivate the Bengali youths to participate in he Liberation War of Bangladesh. He frequently visited the youth camps and transit camps to motivate the Bengali youths and also met the Indian Defense Minister Jagjivan Ram to increase the number of trainee freedom fighters. He met Indian National Congress leader Sarat Chandra Sinha to get the support of the people of Assam in the Liberation War of Bangladesh. He also met Indira Gandhi to increase the number of trainee freedom fighters. He also participated in the World Christian Conference in Delhi. During his Delhi tour he participated in several seminars on the Liberation War of Bangladesh. Pakistan Army burned his house in Chandpur. He spend most of his time in Agartala, Shillong and Kolkata in motivating the Bengali youths and soldiers. After the independence of Bangladesh he returned to Bangladesh on 25 December.

== Post-independence career ==
=== Minister of Information and Radio of Bangladesh ===
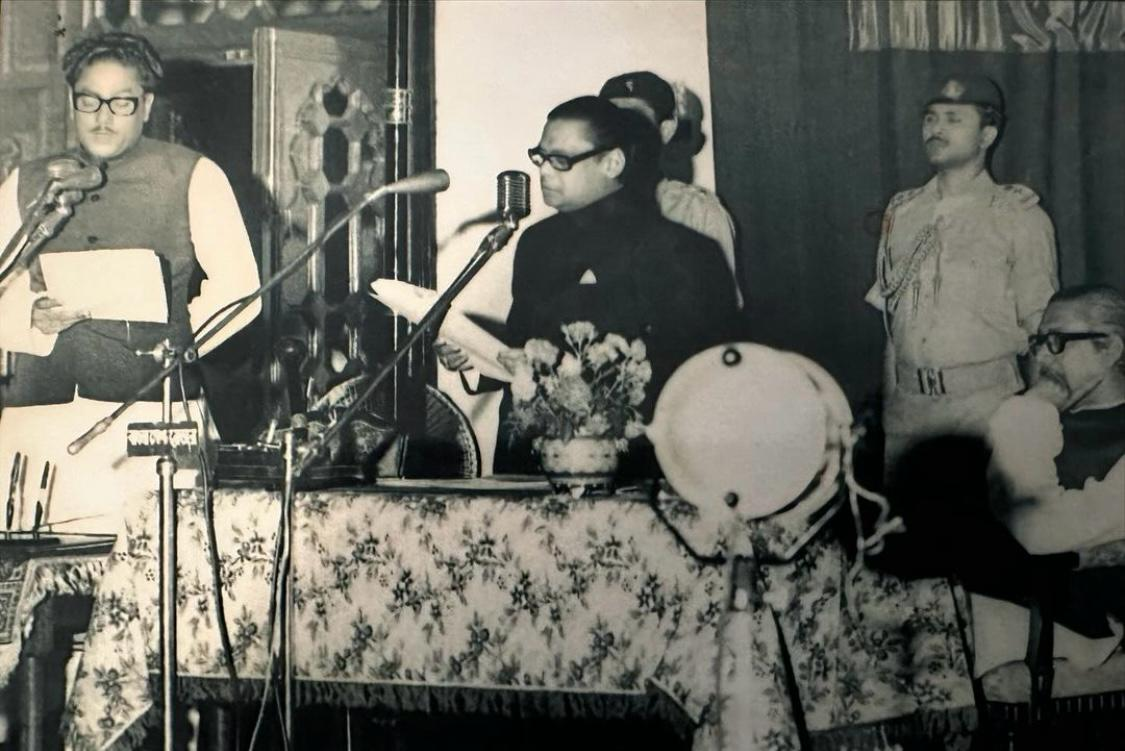
Mizanur Rahman Chowdhury (left) being sworn in as Minister of Information and Radio of Bangladesh during a ceremony presided over by President Abu Syed Chowdhury (center), with Prime Minister Sheikh Mujibur Rahman seated at right.

Mizanur Rahman Chowdhury was included in the Cabinet of Prime Minister Sheikh Mujibur Rahman and sworn in as a Minister on 12 January 1972. He was given the charge of the Ministry of Information and Radio of Bangladesh. He also served as a Member of Constituent Assembly of Bangladesh. After getting the charge of Ministry of Information and Radio of Bangladesh he worked for gathering support for the party. As a close associate of Sheikh Mujibur Rahman, he was part of the founding leadership that shaped the early state institutions and communication strategy of the nascent republic. During his tenure as the Minister of Information and Radio of Bangladesh he helped the martyred radio workers family by giving them jobs in Bangladesh Betar. He held the portfolio of the Minister of Information and Radio of Bangladesh till 16 March 1973.

=== Minister of Disaster Management and Relief ===
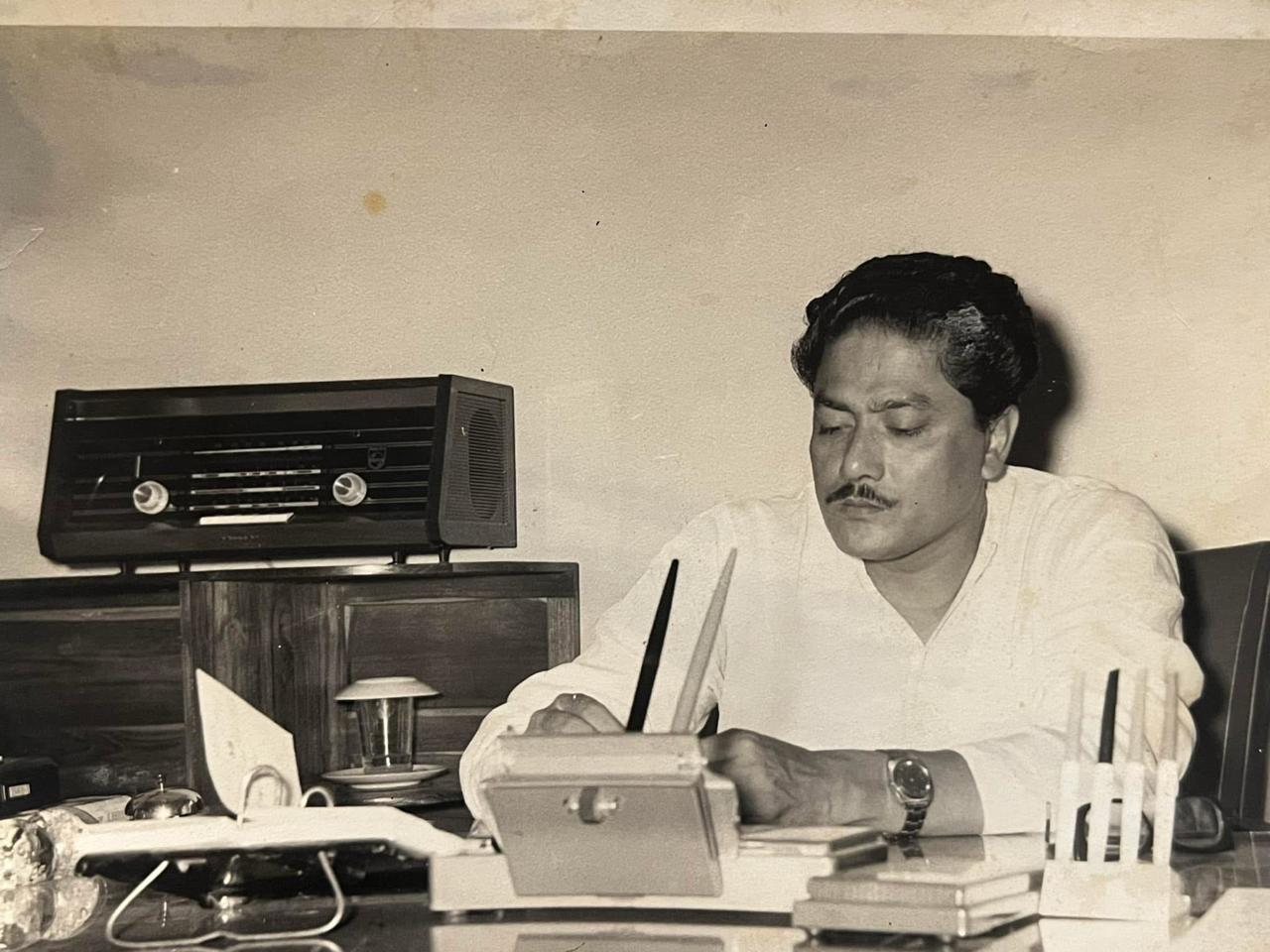
Mizanur Rahman Chowdhury working in his office.

In 1973, he was elected to the 1st Jatiya Sangsad (National Parliament) representing the Awami League, and was appointed the Minister of Disaster Management and Relief, overseeing critical post-war recovery and resettlement efforts. He also revised the Relief Manuel of 1940s. During his tenure he worked in uploading 15,000 ton imported goods and relief materials from Chittagong Port. After 63 days of getting the charge of Ministry of Disaster Management and Relief he resigned from the Cabinet Council on Sheikh Mujibur Rahman's order on 17 May 1973.

=== Resignation from the cabinet and onwards ===
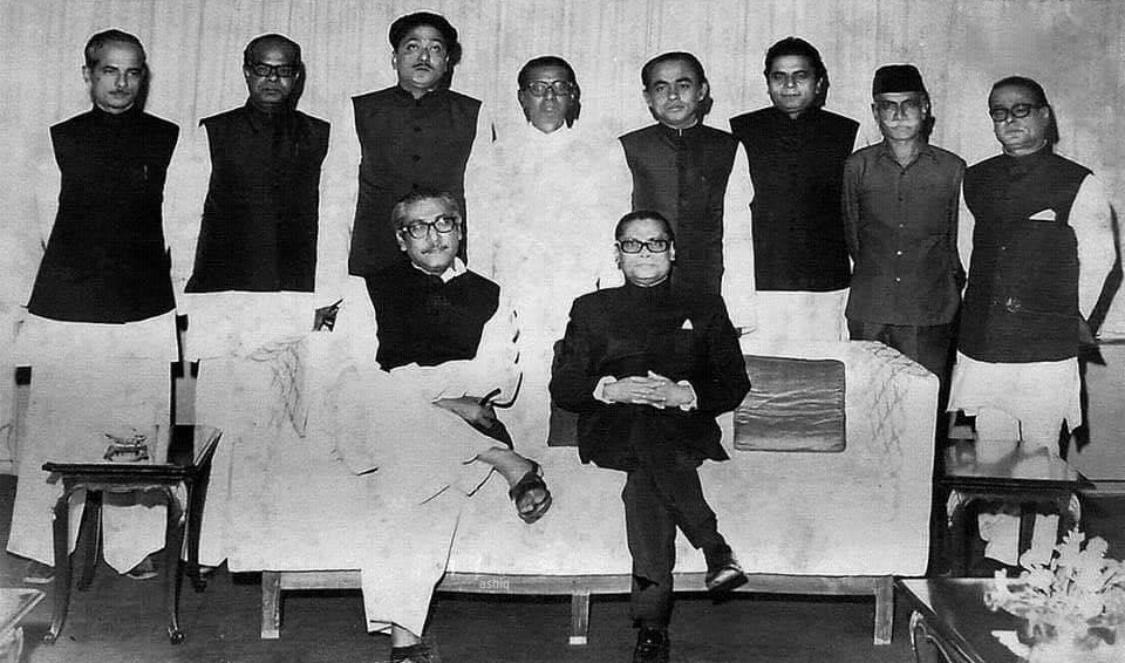
From Left to right: Standing: Abdur Rab Serniabat, Abdul Malek Ukil, Mizanur Rahman Chowdhury, Muhammad Sohrab Hossain, Sheikh Abdul Aziz, Abdul Mannan, General M.A.G Osmani, Shamsul Haq; Sitting: Prime Minister Bangabandhu Sheikh Mujibur Rahman, President Abu Sayeed Chowdhury

After his exit from the cabinet he continued to serve as a Member of Parliament. He was also elected as a member Dhaka University syndicate. In 1974 he led the Bangladesh Parliamentary delegation in the Commonwealth Parliamentary Association Conference. Later he was elected to the executive committee of the Commonwealth Parliamentary Association as the representative of Asia. He also went to Sri Lanka to take part in the Commonwealth Parliamentary Association on behalf of Bangladesh.

=== Formation of Awami League (Mizan) ===
Following the assassination of Sheikh Mujibur Rahman in 1975, the Awami League faced significant internal challenges. On 25 August 1976, a meeting of the party's former central executive members appointed Mizanur Rahman Chowdhury as the convenor of a preparatory committee tasked with re-registering the party under the name "Bangladesh Awami League." This effort led to the party's official registration on 4 November 1976.

During the Awami League's three-day conference from 3 to 5 April 1978, Abdul Malek Ukil was elected president and Abdur Razzaq became general secretary. Mizanur Rahman Chowdhury rejected the legitimacy of this committee. Later disagreement was created between him and some senior leaders about BAKSAL. On 1 August 1978, he, along with Dewan Farid Gazi, formed a separate convenor committee, leading to a formal split in the party. Subsequently, from 3 to 5 November 1978, Chowdhury's faction held its own council at Hotel Eden, electing him as president and Professor Yusuf Ali as general secretary.

In the 1979 general election, under his leadership, the Awami League (Mizan) contested independently and won 2 seats in the 2nd Jatiya Sangsad. Despite his party's defeat, Chowdhury secured win in his constituency (Comilla-22).

His leadership during this politically volatile era signified a continued presence of democratic opposition and the original Awami League ideals.

== Prime Minister of Bangladesh ==
On 27 November 1983 he joined Janadal (now Jatiya Party (Ershad)). Later he became the Acting Chairman Janadal. In 1984 he became the General Secretary of Janadal. On 19 January 1985, he was included in the Cabinet of Hussain Muhammad Ershad as Senior Minister. He was made the Minister of Posts, Telecommunications and Information Technology in 1986. In 1986 he was again elected to the Jatiya Sangsad from Chandpur-4. On 9 July 1986 he was elected the Leader of the House and Prime Minister of Bangladesh.

He was made the prime minister in the cabinet of President Ershad. Mizanur Rahman Chowdhury led the Bangladesh delegation to the 8th Summit of the Non-Aligned Movement held at Harare in Zimbabwe. His term as prime minister ended on 27 March 1988.

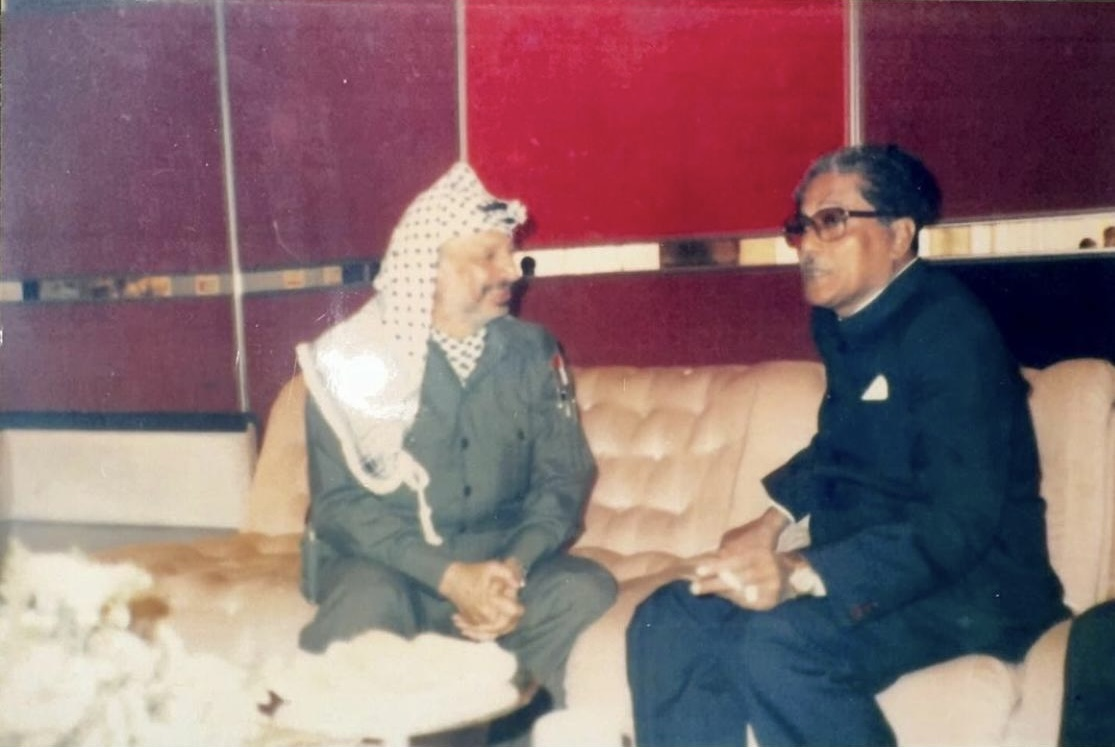
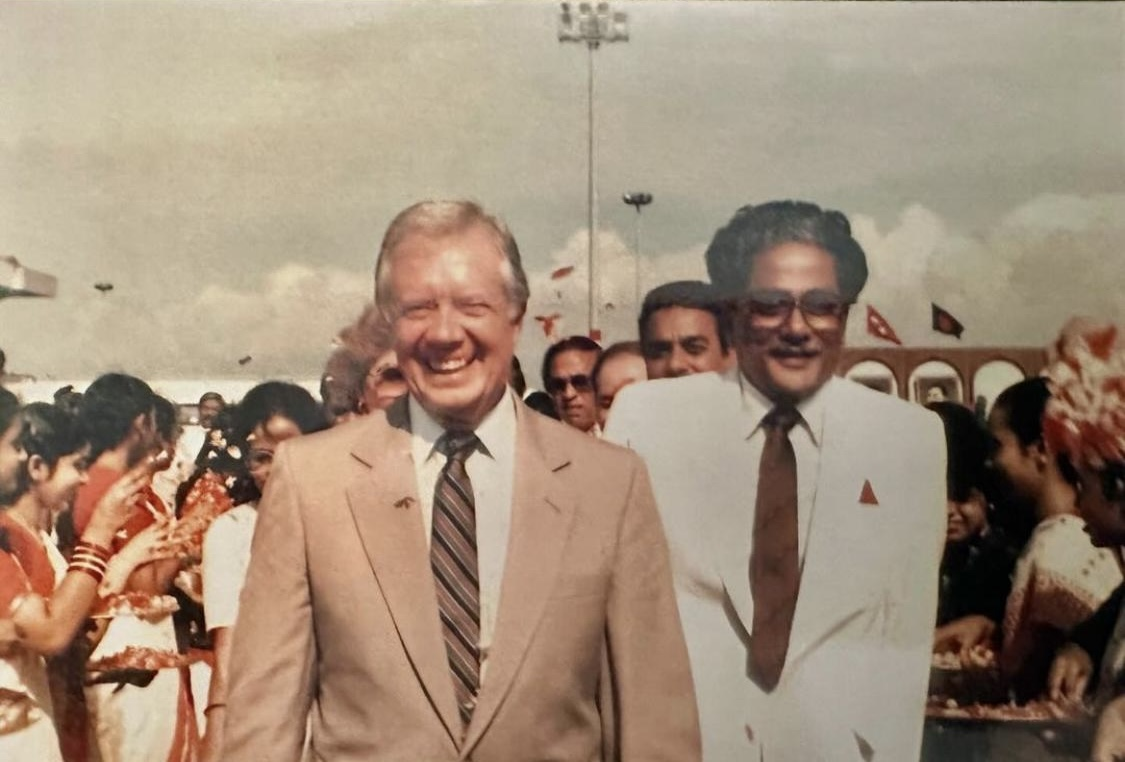
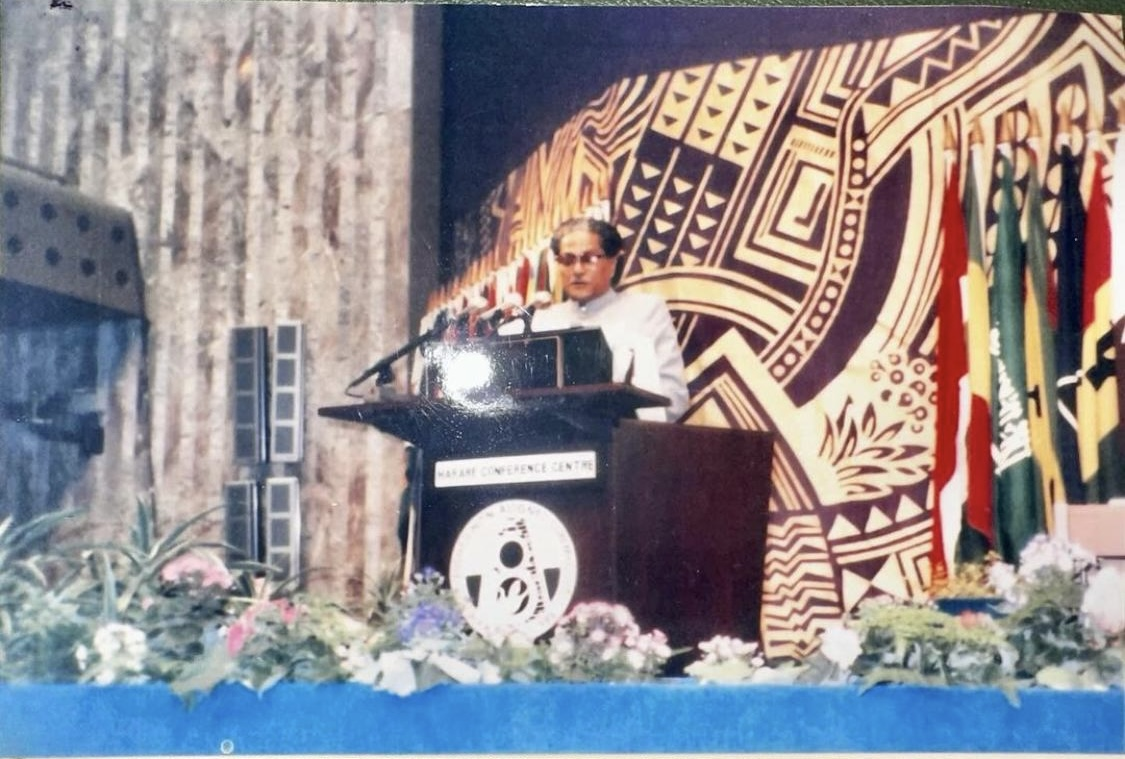
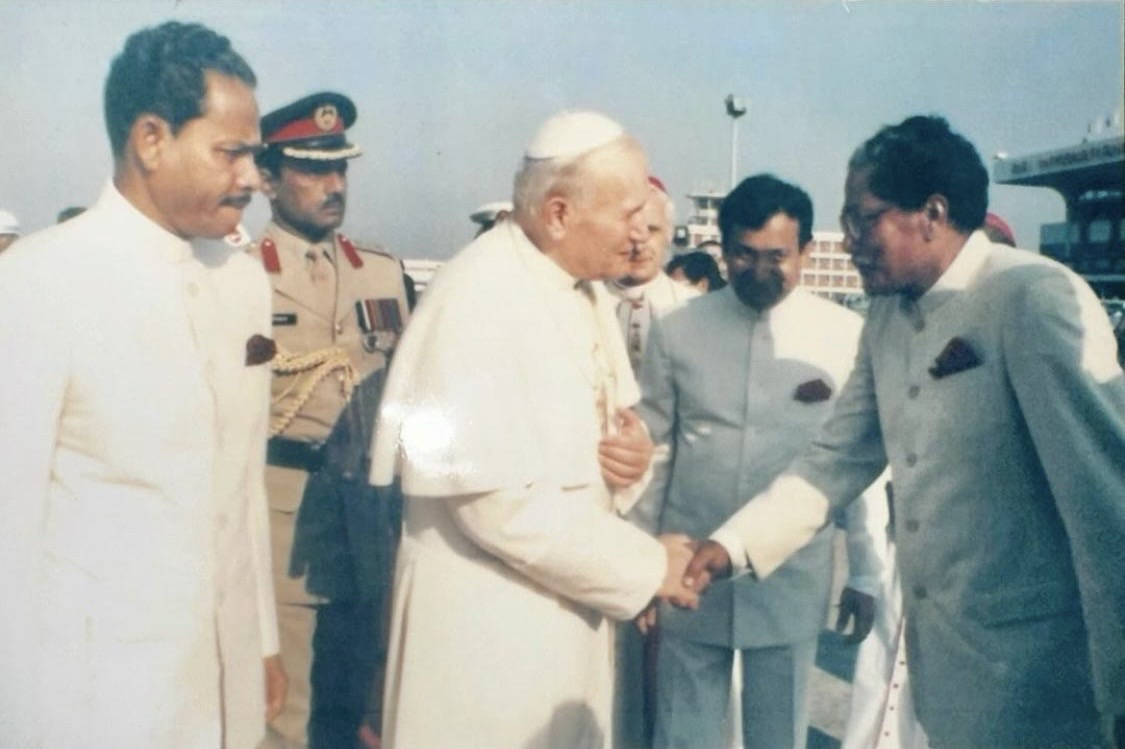
- Top left: President of Palestine Yasser Arafat with Mizanur Rahman Chowdhury in 1984.
- Top right: Former Prime Minister of Bangladesh Mizanur Rahman Chowdhury and Former President of the United States Jimmy Carter during his visit to Bangladesh in 1986.
- Bottom left: Mizanur Rahman Chowdhury leading the Bangladeshi delegation to the 8th Summit of the Non-Aligned Movement held at Harare, Zimbabwe
- Bottom right: Pope John Paul II shaking hands with then Prime Minister of Bangladesh Mizanur Rahman Chowdhury and President Hussein Muhammad Ershad in 1986.

== Later Career (1988-2006) ==
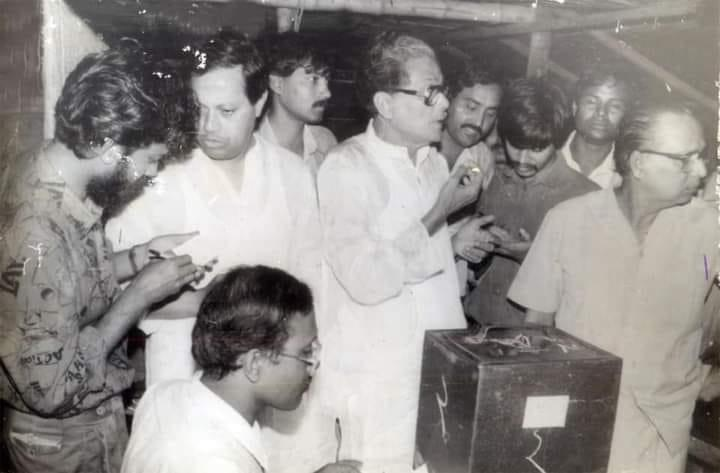
Mizanur Rahman Chowdhury, Barrister Moudud Ahmed and Shah Moazzem Hossain at a vote polling station in Gulshan-2 in 1991

In 1988 he was again elected to the Jatiya Sangsad from Chandpur-4. After his exit from the cabinet he was not active in Jatiya Party despite being the Vice Chairman and Presidium Member of the party. After the fall of Hussain Muhammad Ershad he was the only one who was not in jail or abroad. At this situation and on Hussain Muhammad Ershad's request he became the Acting Chairman of Jatiya Party. After becoming chairman of the party he decided to take part in the 1991 Bangladeshi general election in the banner of Jatiya Party. Under his leadership Jatiya Party began again its organizational activities from January 1991. Jatiya Party contested in 272 seats in 1991 Bangladeshi general election and won 35 seats. Despite winning 35 seats in the elections Chowdhury lost his own seat to BNP's Mohammad Abdullah. In 1991 Bangladeshi general election Hussain Muhammad Ershad contested from 5 constituencies of Rangpur and went to win from all 5 constituencies. But because constitutional obligation he chose to represent Rangpur-3 and quit the other four, triggering by-elections in them. Mizanur Rahman Chowdhury was given the nomination of Rangpur-5 and was elected from Rangpur-5 through by-election on 11 September 1991. He was arrested on 21 April 1991 and was sent to Jessore Central Jail. Later he was shifted to Dhaka Central Jail. After staying one day at Dhaka Central Jail he was taken to Bangladesh Medical University on medical grounds. He was released from jail on 2 August 1991.

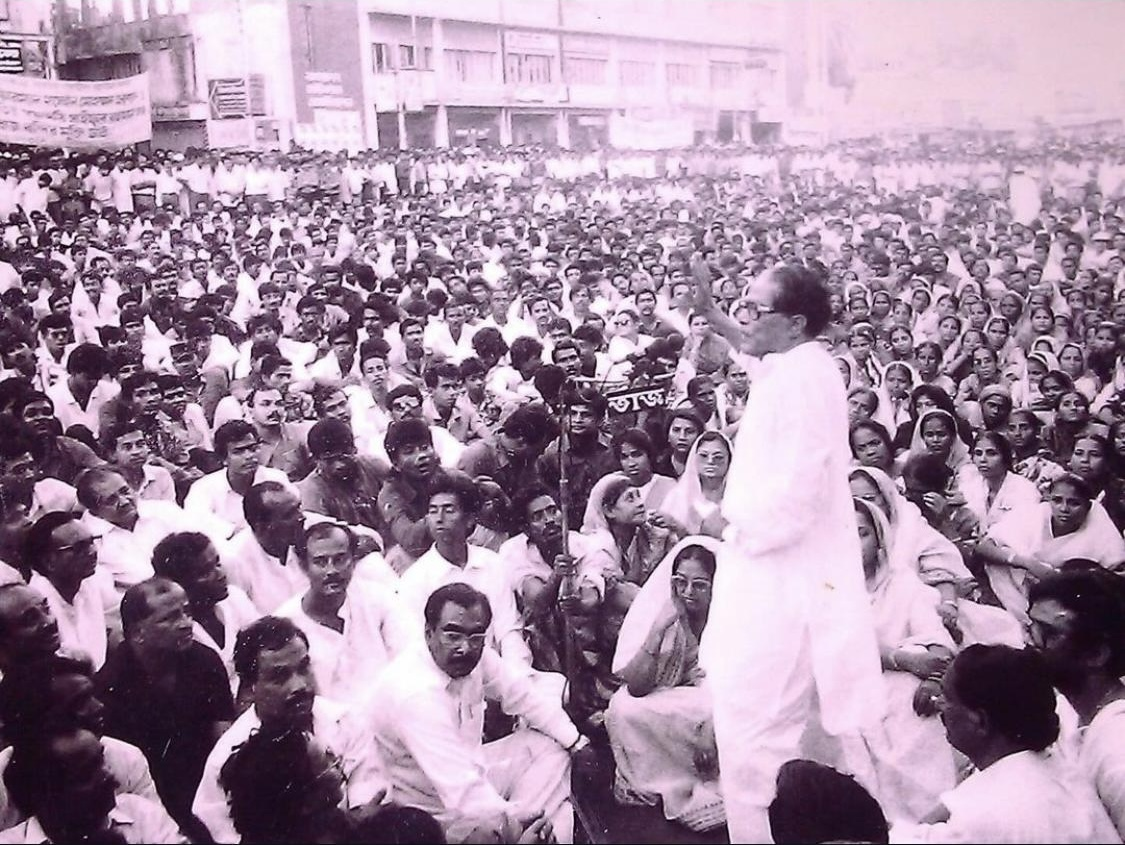
Mizanur Rahman Chowdhury addressing a large public gathering.

Politics in Bangladesh took a decisive turn in 1994, after a by-election in Magura-2. All the opposition parties including Jatiya Party demanded that the next general elections be held under a neutral caretaker government, and that provision for caretaker governments to manage elections be incorporated in the constitution. But the ruling party BNP refused it. As a result, MP's of Jatiya Party and other opposition parties boycotted the parliament in 1994. Later all opposition MPs resigned together send their resignation to the Speaker but the speaker didn't accept it. Jatiya Party boycotted the February 1996 Bangladeshi general election which was held under the BNP led government. The election was boycotted by all major parties except the ruling BNP, who won all the seats in the parliament as a result. The new parliament, composed almost entirely of BNP members, amended the constitution to create provisions for a caretaker government (CTG). The June 1996 Bangladeshi general election was held under a neutral caretaker government which was headed by former Chief Justice Muhammad Habibur Rahman. Chowdhury didn't contest in the election but his party won 32 seats in the elections.

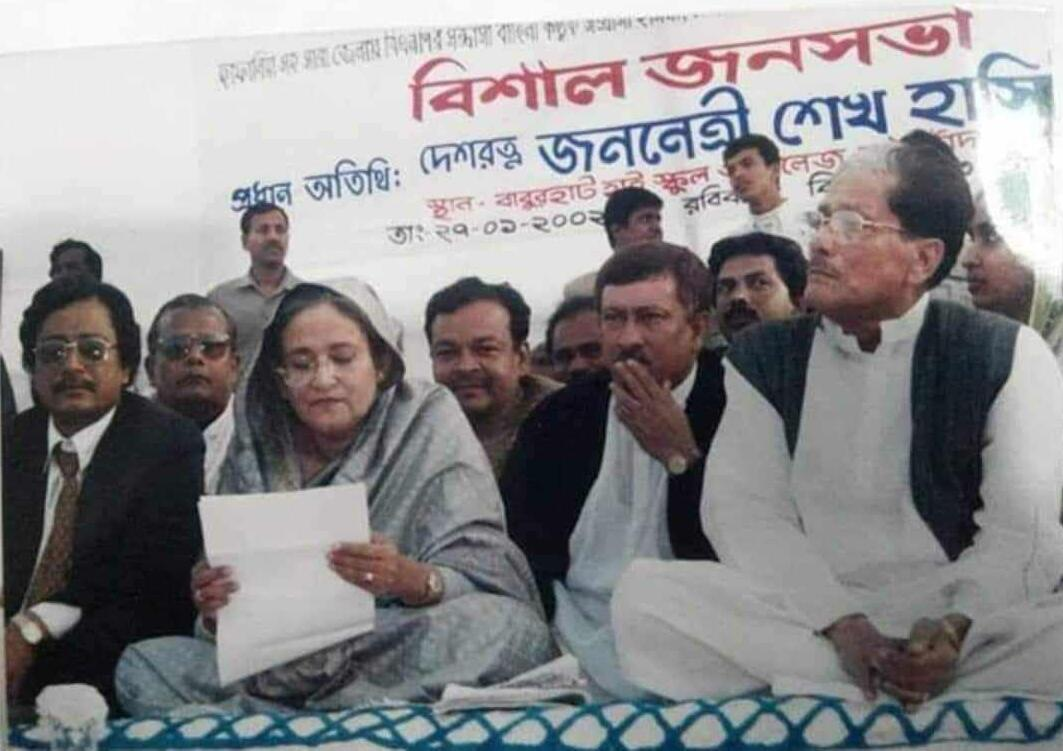
Sheikh Hasina and Mizanur Rahman Chowdhury in 2002 after his return to the Awami League.

After the June 1996 Bangladeshi general election Awami League formed a coalition government with Jatiya Party and Anwar Hossain Manju the then General Secretary of Jatiya Party was included in the newly formed cabinet. When Awami League came to power Hussain Muhammad Ershad was released from jail on 9 January 1997. Following the release of Hussain Muhammad Ershad, Ershad became the Chairman of Jatiya Party and Chowdhury back to his old Vice Chairman's post. Because of having disagreement with Hussain Muhammad Ershad, Chowdhury resigned from all of his posts of Jatiya Party and also cancelled his primary membership on 12 February 1999. Later he along with Anwar Hossain Manju called a separate council of Jatiya Party on 23 and 24 April 1999. He and Anwar Hossain Manju were elected chairman and General Secretary of the party respectively.

He returned to Awami League in 2001 and was a member of the party's advisory committee till his death.

== Personal life ==
Chowdhury was married to Begum Sajeda Mizan Chowdhury. They had four sons, and four daughters.

== Books ==
- রংধনুর ভালোবাসা
- রাজনীতির তিনকাল

== Death ==
He died in February 2006 in Birdem Hospital, Dhaka. His death was widely mourned across the political spectrum. President Iajuddin Ahmed, Prime Minister Khaleda Zia, and Leader of the Opposition Sheikh Hasina expressed deep condolences, recognizing his contributions to the nation.

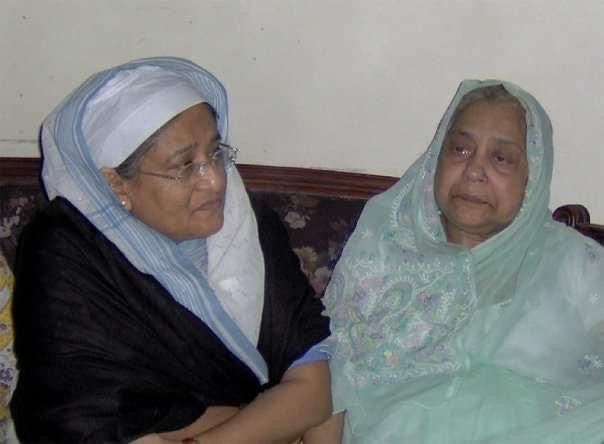
Sheikh Hasina beside Begum Sajeda Mizan Chowdhury, the widow of Mizanur Rahman Chowdhury, at their residence on the day of his death.

President Iajuddin Ahmed, in a condolence message, lauded Mizanur Rahman Chowdhury's pivotal role in the democratic movement, particularly his efforts in shaping parliamentary democracy as a robust institution. He described Chowdhury's passing as an "irrecoverable loss" to the practice of political restraint and to upholding respect for differing opinions.

Prime Minister Khaleda Zia also expressed deep condolences, acknowledging Chowdhury's invaluable contributions to the promotion of democracy. She observed that his death created a significant void in the nation's political landscape, and she prayed for his eternal peace, extending sympathy to his bereaved family. On her behalf, Forest and Environment Minister Torikul Islam placed floral wreath at the coffin of the veteran politician before the janaza.

Opposition Leader Sheikh Hasina reflected on Chowdhury's remarkable legacy, recalling his leadership in mobilizing the nation toward freedom under Bangabandhu Sheikh Mujibur Rahman. She emphasized his distinguished participation in successive movements, beginning with the 1952 Language Movement, which advanced the rights of the Bangalee people.

Several senior Awami League leaders, including Abdul Jalil, Obaidul Quader, Syed Abul Hossain, Major (Retd.) Rafiqul Islam, Mofazzal Hossain Chowdhury, and Noor-E-Alam Chowdhury, accompanied the Leader of the Opposition in paying respects.

Moudud Ahmed, then Law Minister, along with Kazi Zafar Ahmed, Shah Moazzem Hossain, Sheikh Shahidul Islam of Jatiya Party (Manju), and Kader Siddiqui, President of the Krishak Sramik Janata League, also visited the residence of Mizanur Rahman Chowdhury and placed wreaths at his coffin. Multiple funeral prayers were held in his honor—first at Gulshan Azad Mosque, then at the Central Shaheed Minar, the Awami League central office on Bangabandhu Avenue, and Baitul Mukarram National Mosque. He was then taken to his ancestral homes in Shahrasti Upazila and Hajiganj Upazila in Chandpur District for further janazas. Mizanur Rahman Chowdhury was laid to rest at his family graveyard with full state honors.

Political offices
Preceded by Ataur Rahman Khan	Prime Minister of Bangladesh; 1986–1988	Succeeded by Moudud Ahmed
