= Vangni Mosque =

Mosque in Bhangi, Mithapukur, Rangpur, Bangladesh

Coordinates: 25°38′58.19″N 89°19′56.56″E

Vangni Masque
- ভাংনী মসজিদ

Religion
- Affiliation: Islam
- Branch/tradition: Sunni Islam
- District: Rangpur District
- Status: Active

Location
- Location: Vangni Union Bazar, Mithapukur Upazila
- Country: Bangladesh
- Interactive map of Vangni Masque

Architecture
- Style: Mughal
- Funded by: Waqf Estate Vangni
- Dome: 48

Vangni Mosque (Bengali: ভাংনী মসজিদ) is a congregational mosque, located in Bhangi Union of Mithapukur Upazila in Rangpur. Situated at the center of Vangi Bazaar, the mosque, covered in white color, is known to locals as 'Vangi Bazaar Mosque' and 'White Mosque.' The construction date is unknown, but the architectural style resembles Mughal styles. Bibi Monirun Nesha Chowdhurani used to take care of the mosque, and later, with the 100-acre land she donated, the 'Waqf Estate Bhangi' was formed to take care of the mosque.

== Description ==
The walls of the Vangni Mosque are made of limestone mortar or white cement. In summer, the interior of the mosque remains cool, and in winter, it stays warm. People gather in three rows in the main mosque for prayers. To accommodate more people, there was a Mughal-style canopy over the entrance gate on the eastern side of the mosque; due to cracks, a tin canopy has been installed. The mosque's roof, full of diverse ornamentation, has 48 domes of various sizes.
