= Mithapukur Upazila =

Mithapukur মিঠাপুকুর
- Upazila
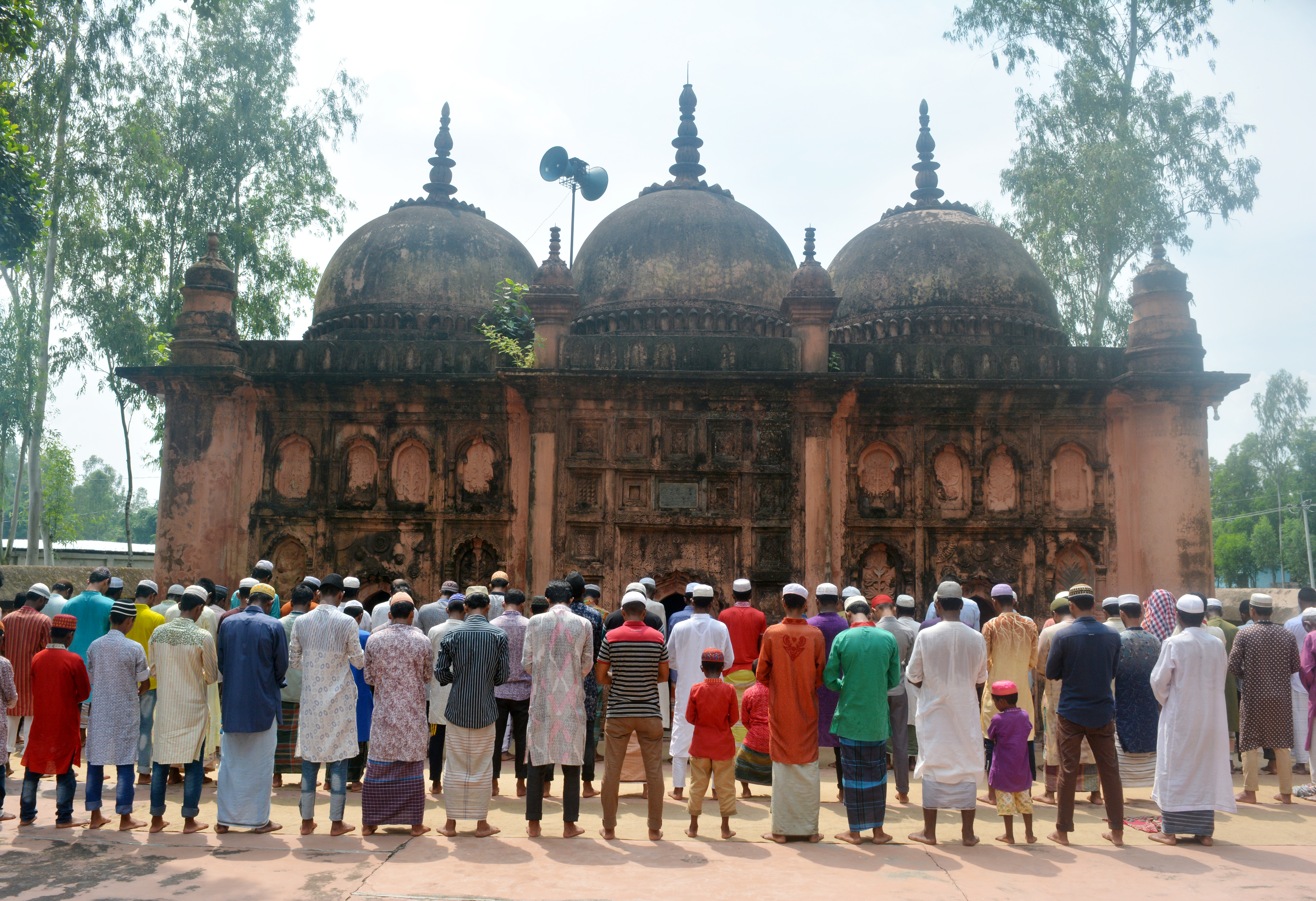
- Jumma worshippers at Mithapukur Mosque

- Coordinates: 25°32.5′N 89°17′E
- Country: Bangladesh
- Division: Rangpur
- District: Rangpur

Area
  - Total: 515.62 km^{2} (199.08 sq mi)

Population (2022)
  - Total: 538,723
  - Density: 1,044.8/km^{2} (2,706.0/sq mi)
- Time zone: UTC+6 (BST)
- Postal code: 5460
- Area code: 05225
- Website: mithapukur.rangpur.gov.bd

Mithapukur Upazila mauza geocode map

Mithapukur (মিঠাপুকুর Mithapukur [ˈmiʈʰaˌpukur]) is an upazila of Rangpur District in Rangpur Division, Bangladesh. The upazila is situated in the middle of Rangpur, surrounded by Rangpur Sadar to the north, Pirganj to the south, Badarganj and Phulbari to the west and Pirgachha and Sundarganj to the east. Mithapukur is famous for being the birthplace of Begum Rokeya and its sweet mango Harivanga.

== Etymology ==
Mithapukur is the largest upazila in Rangpur zila in respect of both area and population. It came into existence in 1885 as a thana and was upgraded to upazila in 1983. Nothing is definitely known about the origin of the upazila name. It is said that Mir Jumla II, the Subahdar of Bengal, came there by the order of the Mughal Emperor Aurangzeb in order to invade Koch Bihar. He set up a camp near the current Mithapukur Degree College during the period of his military expedition in Bengal. His forces faced an acute problem of water for which a pond was dug near the camp. The water of the pond was so sweet that Mir Jumla named the place "Mithapukur" (Mitha means Sweet and Pukur means Pond). Some believe that Shah Ismail Ghazi ordered to dig the pond. It is believed that the pond consisted of five separate ponds. But in course of time, they mixed into a single pond.

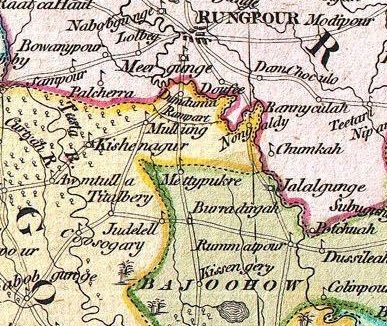
Mithapukur (then, Mettypukre) in the Dury Wall Map of Bihar and Bengal, India in 1776

The name Mithapukur also appears in the James Rennell's Dury Wall Map of Bihar and Bengal, India (as Mettypukre) and N. Hindostan Map (as Mettypokra) and John Bartholomew's Map of Provinces of the Lower Ganges (as Mitapokhar).

== Geography ==
Mithapukur is located at 25.5417°N 89.2833°E. It has total area 515.62 km^{2}. Mithapukur possesses a vast fertile land. The Jamuneshwari, Akhira, and Ghaghot are the major river flow through Mithapukur. The river Akhira has divided Mithapukur landscape into two parts. The western part of Mithapukur is locally known as "Khiyari" (probably derived from the word "khoyeri" meaning reddish brown) due to its reddish-brown soil and the eastern part is known as "Poly" (sediment) area. The eastern part is the largest. Mithapukur is inside the Varendra area. Many "Shalbon" (a forest whose main tree is the Shala tree) can be found in the western part of the Upazila which are thought to be the parts of a huge Varendra forest. Most of them are now reserved by the government. The Gopalpur Forest is the main landmark of Terrace soil area.

== Demographics ==
Religions in Mithapukur Upazila (2022)
Religion	Percent
Islam	91.21%
Hinduism	7.85%
Christianity	0.49%
Other or not stated	0.45%

According to the 2022 Bangladeshi census, Mithapukur Upazila had 152,544 households and a population of 538,723. 8.74% of the population were under 5 years of age. Mithapukur had a literacy rate (age 7 and over) of 69.33%: 71.92% for males and 66.87% for females, and a sex ratio of 96.09 males for every 100 females. 29,066 (5.40%) lived in urban areas. Ethnic population was 7546 (1.40%) of which Oraon were 5179.

Population of upazila by ethnicity (2022)
1. Bengali (98.6%)
2. Oraon (0.96%)
3. Others (0.44%)

According to the 2011 Census of Bangladesh, Mithapukur Upazila had 135,073 households and a population of 508,133. 110,797 (21.80%) were under 10 years of age. Mithapukur had a literacy rate (age 7 and over) of 46.04%, compared to the national average of 51.8%, and a sex ratio of 1014 females per 1000 males. 7,062 (1.39%) lived in urban areas. Ethnic population was 7,893 (1.55%), of which Oraon were 5,579 and Santal 1,495.

As of the 1991 Bangladesh census, Mithapukur has a population of 409915. Males constitute are 51.09% of the population, and females 48.91%. This upazila's eighteen up population is 207,035. Mithapukur has an average literacy rate of 23% (7+ years), and the national average of 32.4% literate.

Mithapukur Upazila has a very diverse population with minority groups including Buddhists, Christians and tribes such as Santhal who have lived in the district from the beginning of settlement in this area.

== Economy ==
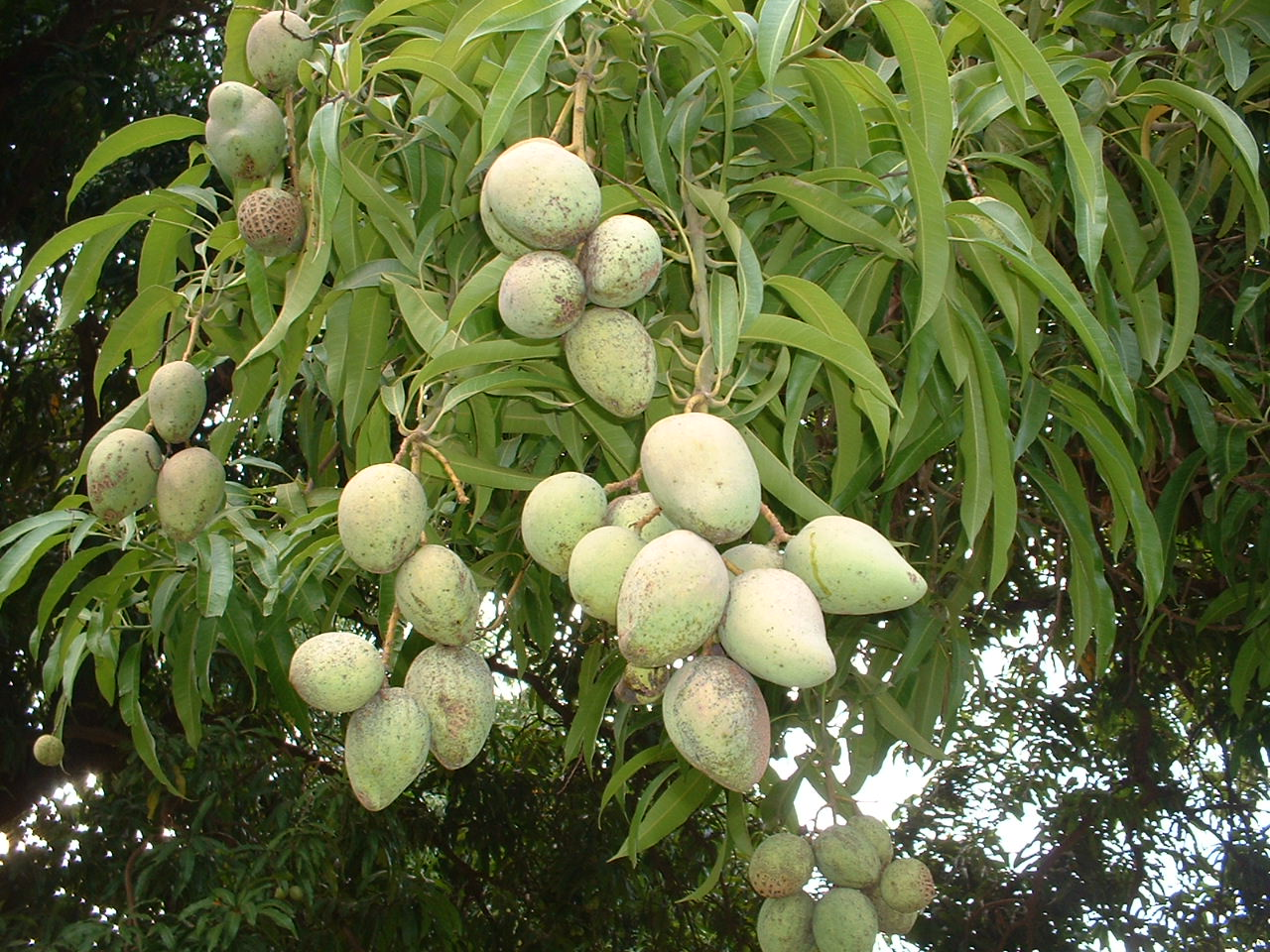
Unripe mangoes on a mango tree, Harivanga Mango

Agriculture is demographically the broadest economic sector and plays a significant role in the overall socio-economic fabric of Mithapukur. Mithapukur is the largest producer of mangoes, vegetables and potatoes in the district. Mithapukur is the birthplace of the sweet mango Harivanga, famous for its different taste.

== Points of interest ==
Mithapukur Upazila has many historical and attractive places. Begum Rokeya Memorial in Pairaband is the birthplace of Begum Rokeya Sakhawat Hossain (1880–1932), an eminent educationist and a pioneer of women's liberation. Mithapukur's most popular tourist attractions are the Mithapukur Pond (excavated during the Mughal period), Benubon Buddhist Vihara - Mithapukur, the Mughal era three domed Mithapukur Mosque, Tanka jami Mosque at Latibpur, and Gopalpur forest and Eco park.

Mithapukur Mughal Era Mosque

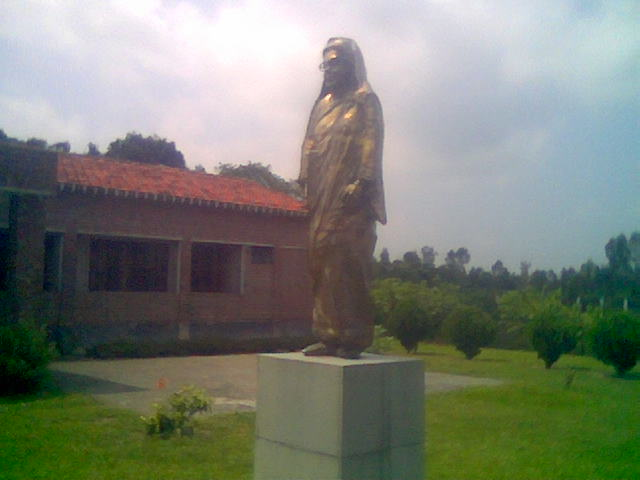
Statue of Begum Rokeya near Begum Rokeya Memorial

== Administration ==
UNO: Bikash Chandro Bormon.

Mithapukur Upazila is divided into Badarganj Municipality and 17 union parishads: Balarhat, Balua Masimpur, Barabala, Bara Hazratpur, Bhangni, Chengmari, Durgapur, Emadpur, Gopalpur, Kafrikhal, Khoragachh, Latibpur, Milanpur, Mirzapur, Moyenpur, Pairaband, and Ranipukur. The union parishads are subdivided into 310 mauzas and 315 villages.

== Education ==
=== Educational institutions ===
(a) Primary Schools: 268 (B) Lower secondary schools: 20 (C) Secondary schools: 85 (D) Madrasas: 52 (E) Technical schools and colleges: 5 (F) Kinder Garden: 35 (G) Ibtedayi Madrasa: 50 (H) BRAC Primary School: 39 (I) Colleges: 16

== Transport ==
Mithapukur is well connected to Dhaka, Rangpur, Bogra by National highway. Mithapukur can be reached by the 304 km long National highway(N5) from Dhaka. The highway also provides a link to the neighbouring divisional town Rangpur by 18 km from Upazila Sadar. Highway buses run from kallanpur, Dhaka to Rangpur and it takes about six to seven hours.

== Notable people ==
- Begum Rokeya (1880–1932), writer, educationist, and social activist
- Karimunnesa Khanam Chaudhurani (1855–1926), poet and social worker
- Hamiduzzaman Sarkar, politician
- Mohammad Harij Uddin Sarker, politician
- H. N. Ashequr Rahman (born 1941), politician and industrialist
- Khandaker Golam Mostafa (1943–2020), politician and journalist
- Zakir Hossain Sarkar (born 1960), politician
- Shah Md. Soliman Alam, politician
- Dr. Harun-Ur-Rashid Askari (born 1965), bilingual writer, fictionist, columnist, translator, professor of English, 12th vice-chancellor of Islamic University, Bangladesh and former Director General of Bangla Academy Dhaka.

== See also ==
- Upazilas of Bangladesh
- Districts of Bangladesh
- Divisions of Bangladesh
- Upazila Nirbahi Officer
- Administrative geography of Bangladesh
