= Rangpur-5 =

Constituency of Bangladesh's Jatiya Sangsad

Coordinates: 25.57°N 89.27°E

- Constituency for the Jatiya Sangsad
- District: Rangpur District
- Division: Rangpur Division
- Electorate: 469,189 (2026)

Current constituency
- Created: 1973
- Party: Bangladesh Jamaat-e-Islami
- Member: Md. Golam Rabbani
- ← 22 Rangpur-4 24 Rangpur-6 →

Rangpur-5 is a constituency represented in the Jatiya Sangsad (National Parliament) of Bangladesh since 2026 by Md. Golam Rabbani of the Bangladesh Jamaat-e-Islami.

== Boundaries ==
The constituency encompasses Mithapukur Upazila.

== History ==
The constituency was created for the first general elections in newly independent Bangladesh, held in 1973.

== Members of Parliament ==
Election	Member	Party
1973	Abid Ali	Awami League
1979	Kazi Nuruzzaman	Bangladesh Nationalist Party
Major Boundary Changes
1986	H. N. Ashequr Rahman	Awami League
1988	Mohammad Harij Uddin Sarker	Jatiya Party (Ershad)
Sep 1991 by-election	Mizanur Rahman Chowdhury	Jatiya Party (Ershad)
Sep 1996 by-election	H. N. Ashequr Rahman	Awami League
2001	Shah Md. Soliman Alam	Islami Jatiya Oikya Front
2008	H. N. Ashequr Rahman	Awami League
2014	H. N. Ashequr Rahman	Awami League
2018	H. N. Ashequr Rahman	Awami League
2024	Zakir Hossain Sarkar	Independent
2026	Md. Golam Rabbani	Bangladesh Jamaat-e-Islami

== Elections ==
=== Elections in the 2020s ===
General election 2026: Rangpur-5
Party	Candidate	Votes	%	±%
Jamaat	Md. Golam Rabbani	176,411		
BNP	Md. Golam Rabbani	115,116		
Majority				
Turnout		316,691		
Registered electors		469,189		
Jamaat gain from Independent				

=== Elections in the 2010s ===
H. N. Ashequr Rahman was elected unopposed in the 2014 general election after opposition parties withdrew their candidacies in a boycott of the election.

=== Elections in the 2000s ===
General Election 2008: Rangpur-5
Party	Candidate	Votes	%	±%
AL	H. N. Ashequr Rahman	124,684	43.9	+11.6
JP(E)	SM Fakhar-uz-Zaman	100,348	35.4	N/A
Jamaat	Shah Md. Hafizur Rahman	56,053	19.8	−2.9
IAB	Abdul Gani	1,542	0.5	N/A
BSD	Md. Mominul Islam	871	0.3	N/A
PDP	Md. Rafiqul Islam Sarkar	277	0.1	N/A
Majority		24,336	8.6	−2.7
Turnout		283,775	90.4	+7.9
AL gain from IJOF				

General Election 2001: Rangpur-5
Party	Candidate	Votes	%	±%
IJOF	Shah Md. Soliman Alam	101,956	43.6	
AL	H. N. Ashequr Rahman	75,608	32.3	
Jamaat	Abu Bakar Wahedi	53,179	22.7	
CPB	Md. Shamsuzzaman	1,255	0.5	
Jatiya Party (M)	Mostafizur Rahman	871	0.4	
Independent	Md. Rustam Ali	356	0.2	
Independent	Md. Kamruzzaman	255	0.1	
Independent	Md. Nozmuch Sakib Pradhan	228	0.1	
Independent	Tajul Kabir Chowdhury	75	0.0	
Independent	Md. Kamrul Hasan	50	0.0	
Majority		26,348	11.3	
Turnout		233,833	82.5	
IJOF gain from AL				

=== Elections in the 1990s ===
Hussain Muhammad Ershad stood from jail for five seats in the June 1996 general election: Rangpur-2, Rangpur-3, Rangpur-5, Rangpur-6, and Kurigram-3. After winning all five, he chose to represent Rangpur-3 and quit the other four, triggering by-elections in them. H. N. Ashequr Rahman was elected in a September 1996 by-election.

General Election June 1996: Rangpur-5
Party	Candidate	Votes	%	±%
JP(E)	Hussain Muhammad Ershad	87,387	51.5	
AL	H. N. Ashequr Rahman	50,839	30.0	
Jamaat	Abu Mozaffar Ahmed	24,531	14.5	
BNP	Md. Nurul Huda	3,305	2.0	
Ganatantri Party	Md. Samsuzzaman	1,263	0.7	
Zaker Party	Md. Taslim Prodhan	1,020	0.6	
Independent	Mozammel Hossain	337	0.2	
FP	Md. Mojibur Rahman Sarkar	326	0.2	
Independent	Golam Mohammad Kader	310	0.2	
Independent	Md. Nozmuch Sakib Pradhan	242	0.1	
Majority		36,548	21.6	
Turnout		169,570	74.1	
JP(E) hold				

Hussain Muhammad Ershad stood from jail for five seats in the 1991 general election: Rangpur-1, Rangpur-2, Rangpur-3, Rangpur-5, and Rangpur-6. After winning all five, he chose to represent Rangpur-3 and quit the other four, triggering by-elections in them. Mizanur Rahman Chowdhury, of the Jatiya Party, was elected in a September 1991 by-election.

General Election 1991: Rangpur-5
Party	Candidate	Votes	%	±%
JP(E)	Hussain Muhammad Ershad	71,132	50.2	
AL	H. N. Ashequr Rahman	38,810	27.4	
Jamaat	Abu Bakar Wahedi	25,425	18.0	
BNP	Md. Nurul Huda	3,066	2.2	
Zaker Party	Md. Taslim Prodhan	2,000	1.4	
CPB	Md. Ahmmod Ali	408	0.3	
FP	Md. Mojibur Rahman Sarkar	365	0.3	
Independent	Md. Shahzahan Mondol	351	0.2	
Majority		32,322	22.8	
Turnout		141,557	61.3	
JP(E) gain from				
