= Jaro Křivohlavý =

Czech psychologist and writer

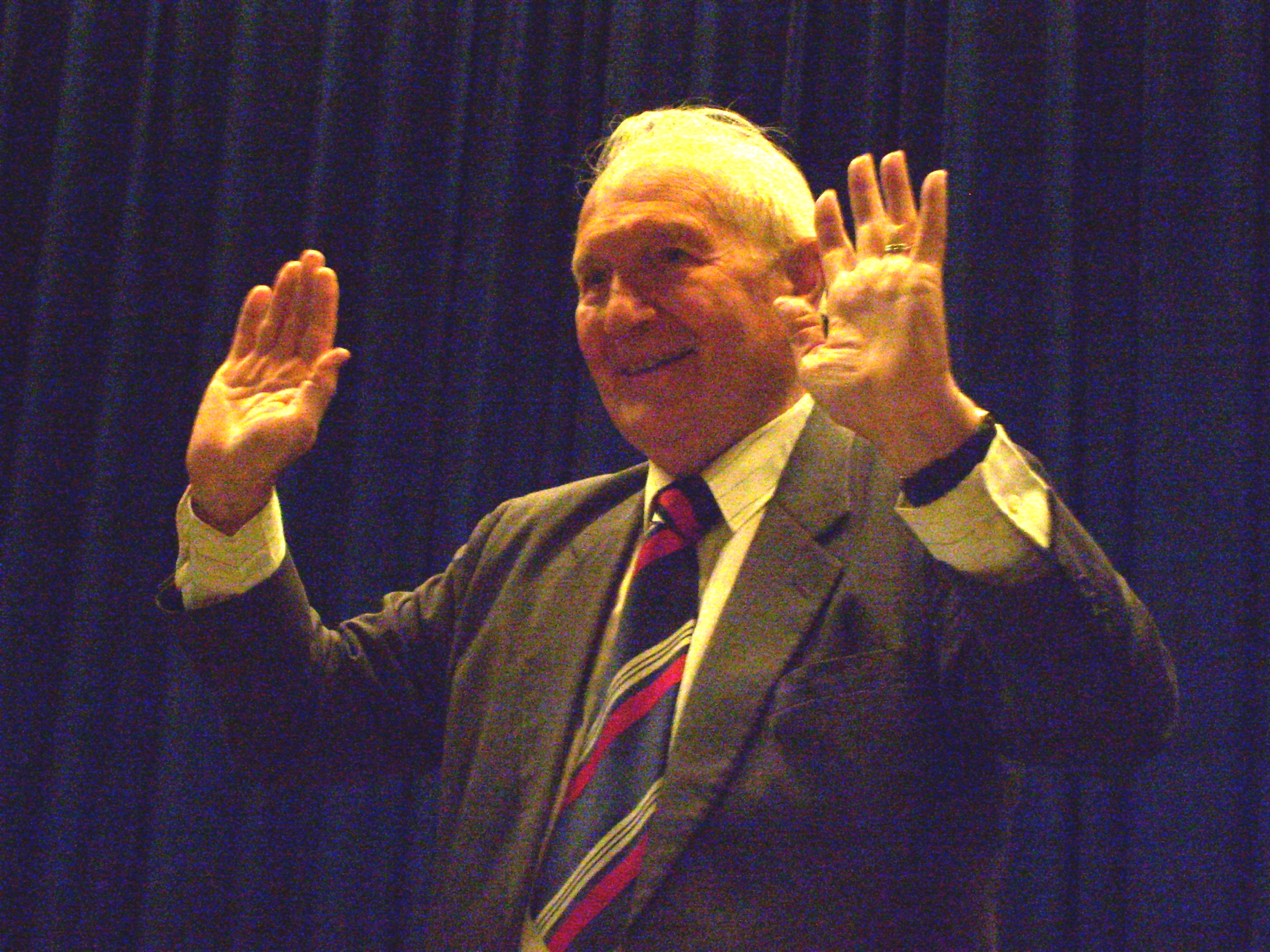
Jaro Křivohlavý

Jaro Křivohlavý (19 March 1925 – 27 December 2014) was a Czech psychologist and writer. He dealt with health psychology, experimental psychology and logotherapy. He published a number of books on stress, aging, happiness and also forgiveness and its impact on human health.

== Life ==
Křivohlavý was born on 19 March 1925 in Třebenice (Czechoslovakia). When he was 17, he was imprisoned by Nazis in Small Fortress in Terezín. Later, during the communist regime, he was forced to work for three years in the Prago IV mine in Kladno.

He studied on the Faculty of Philosophy of the Charles University, majoring in psychology, philosophy and Anglicistics. In 1950 he obtained a Ph.D. in philosophy.

In 1996 he was granted the title of Doctor of Science. Later, after his habilitation on the Masaryk University (Brno), the president of the Czech Republic Václav Havel awarded him with the university professor degree.

In 1967–1994 he worked in the Postgradual Medical Institute in Prague teaching medical doctors in their preparation for specializing in medicine, and working in the hospitals especially with cancer patients, coronary patients and with the handicapped. In those years, he gave lectures and published both in the Czech Republic and abroad. Later, he taught health psychology at the Faculty of Humanities at the Charles University, Prague.

Křivohlavý was a Protestant, he was a member of the Evangelical Church of Czech Brethren, baptised and confirmed (1939), ordained presbyter and lay preacher. For five years he was a member of the Prague-region administration of the church and for 15 years (1969–1984) thrice elected as a lay member of the leading body of the whole church, the Synodal Counsel. In 1967 he was a member of the Church and Society WCC meeting in Geneve, and in 1968 an adviser to the Uppsala general meeting of the WCC.

Křivohlavý had been married since 1951 and had three children.

== Bibliography ==
- Psychologie smysluplnosti existence (Grada Publishing, Praha, 2006)
- O Šťastném manželství (Karmelitánské nakladatelství, Kostelní Vydří 2005)
- Pozitivní psychologie (Portál, Praha 2004)
- Jak přežít vztek, zlost a agresi (Grada Publishing, Praha 2004)
- O odpouštění s Jaro Křivohlavým (Karmelitánské nakladatelství, Kostelní Vydří 2004)
- Duševní hygiena zdravotní sestry (Grada Publishing, Praha 2004)
- Konflikty mezi lidmi (Portál, Praha 2002)
- Psychologie nemoci (Grada Publishing, Praha 2001)
- Psychologie zdraví (Portál, Praha 2001)
- Pastorální péče (Oliva, Praha 2000)
- Jak neztratit nadšení (Grada Publishing, Praha 1998)
- Jak zvládat depresi (Grada Publishing, Praha 1997)
- Sdílení naděje (Návrat domů, Praha 1997)
- Tajemství úspěšného jednání (Grada-Avicenum, Praha 1995)
- Poslední úsek cesty (spolu s Mgr. S. Kaczmarczykem) (Návrat domů, Praha 1995)
- Jak zvládat stres (Grada - Avicenum, Praha 1994)
- Mít pro co žít (Návrat, Praha 1994)
- Povídej - naslouchám (Návrat, Praha 1993)
- Bolest, její diagnostika a psychoterapie (Praha, Institut pro další vzdělávání lékařů a farmaceutů, 1992)
- Křesťanská péče o nemocné (Advent, Praha 1991)
- Vážně nemocný mezi námi (Praha, Avicenum, 1989)
- Jak si navzájem lépe porozumíme (Svoboda, 1988)
- Neverbální komunikace (Praha, SPN, 1988)
- Já a ty: O zdravých vztazích mezi lidmi (Avicenum, 1986)
- Psychologická rehabilitace zdravotně postižených (Avicenum, 1985)
- Zwischenmenschliche Konlikte und experimentelle Spiele (Hans Huber Verlag, Bern, 1973)
- Metodika experimentálních her (Praha, UK FF, 1973)
- Člověk a stroj: Úvod do inženýrské psychologie (Práce, 1970)
