= Md Golam Rabbani =

Bangladeshi politician

Md. Golam Rabbani
- মো: গোলাম রাব্বানী

Member of Parliament
- Incumbent
- Assumed office 17 February 2026
- Preceded by: Zakir Hossain Sarkar
- Constituency: Rangpur-5

Personal details
- Born: 25 January 1963 (age 63) Rangpur District, East Pakistan
- Party: Bangladesh Jamaat-e-Islami
- Occupation: Politician

Md. Golam Rabbani is a Bangladeshi politician affiliated with Bangladesh Jamaat-e-Islami. He is an elected member of parliament from the Rangpur-5 constituency.
