= Muhammad Shafiqur Rahman =

Bangladeshi politician and journalist (1949–2026)

- মুহাম্মদ শফিকুর রহমান
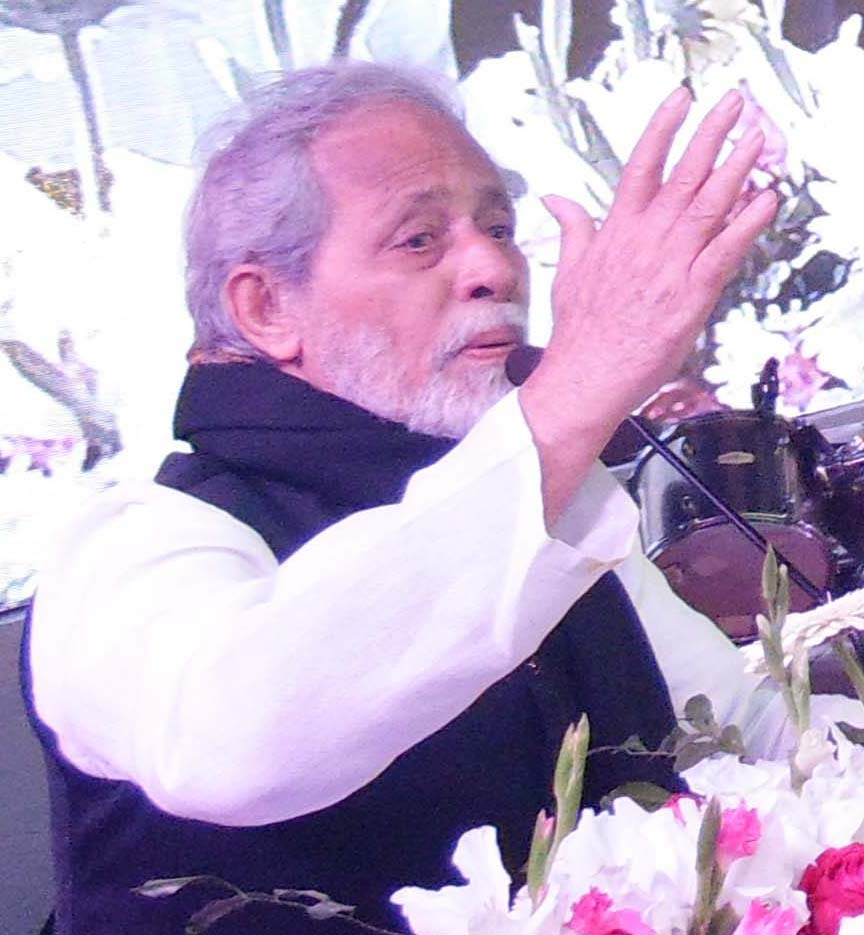

Member of the Bangladesh Parliament for Chandpur-4
- In office 30 January 2019 – 6 August 2024
- Prime Minister: Sheikh Hasina
- Preceded by: Shamsul Hoque Bhuiyan
- Succeeded by: Abdul Hannan

Personal details
- Born: 25 September 1949 Chandpur, East Bengal, Dominion of Pakistan
- Died: 24 October 2026 (aged 77) Dhaka, Bangladesh
- Party: Bangladesh Awami League
- Education: University of Dhaka (BA and MA)
- Occupation: Politician, journalist

Muhammad Shafiqur Rahman (25 September 1949 – 24 October 2026) was a Bangladeshi journalist and politician who was a Jatiya Sangsad member, representing the Chandpur-4 constituency. He was a member of the Bangladesh Awami League.

== Early life ==
Muhammad Shafiqur Rahman was born on 25 September 1949 in Krishnapur village in Faridganj of Chandpur District in the then East Bengal, Dominion of Pakistan. He earned his bachelor's and master's degrees in Bengali language and literature from the University of Dhaka in 1970 and 1971, respectively. He participated in the 1969 Mass Uprising and the 1971 Liberation War.

== Career ==
Rahman started working as a journalist in 1970 with The Daily Ittefaq; he served as a staff reporter, a senior reporter, and a special correspondent. He was the president of the Jatiya Press Club for two terms during 2016–2018.

Rahman was elected to parliament from Chandpur-4 as a Bangladesh Awami League candidate on 30 December 2018. He received 173,369 votes while his nearest rival of the Bangladesh Nationalist Party, Harunur Rashid, received 30,799 votes.

Rahman was reelected to parliament from Chandpur-4 in 2024.

Rahman alleged Benazir Ahmed, former inspector general of Bangladesh Police and director general of Rapid Action Battalion, forcefully took control of 70 percent share of his company Citizen TV along with Chowdhury Nafeez Sarafat and Razzakul Hossain Tutul with the threat of violence.

Rahman died from a stroke on 24 October 2026, at the age of 77.
