= Třebenice (Litoměřice District) =

- Town
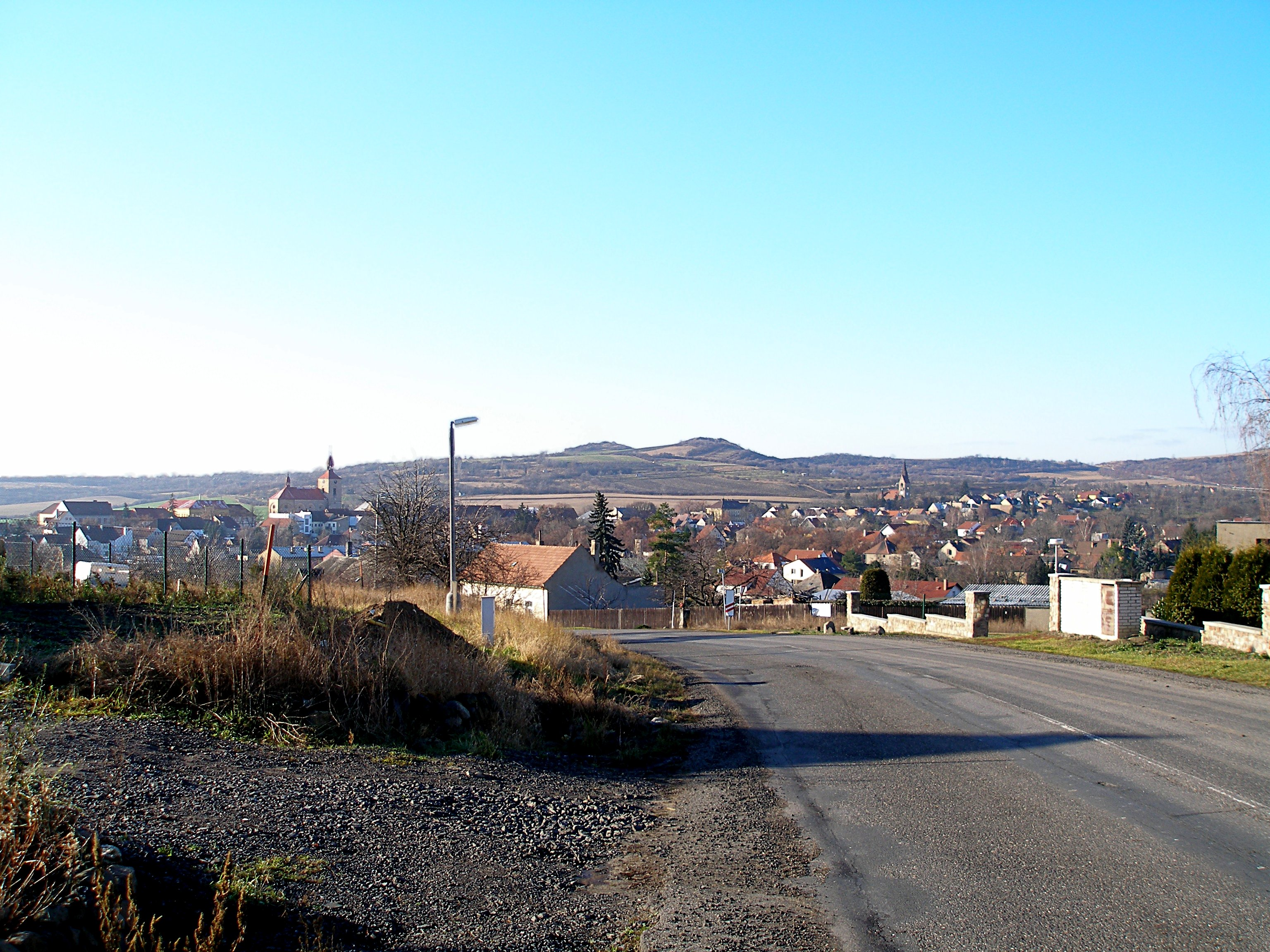
- View from the northeast

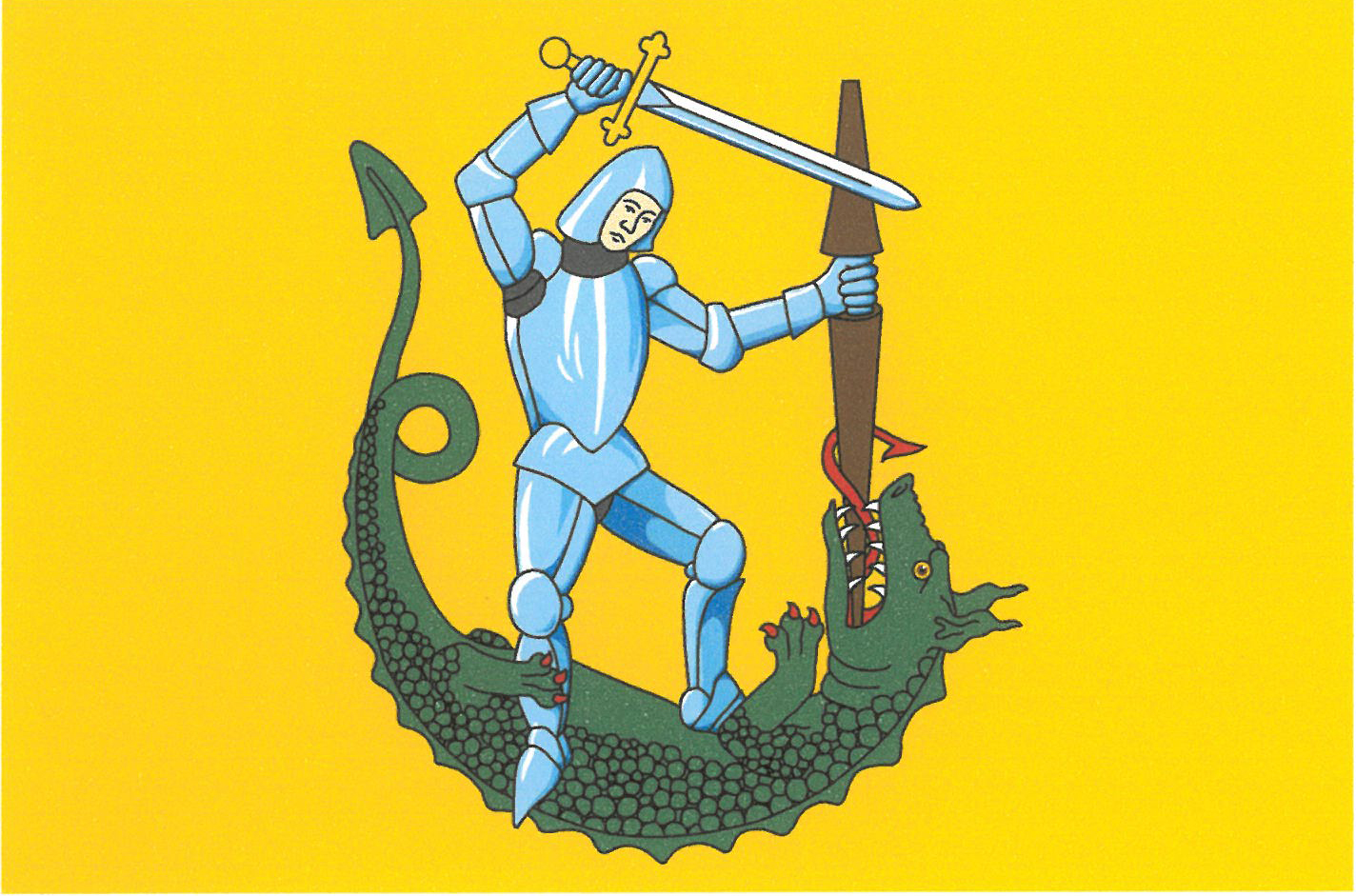
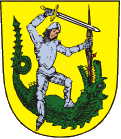
- Flag Coat of arms

- Location in the Czech Republic
- Coordinates: 50°28′35″N 13°59′25″E
- Country: Czech Republic
- Region: Ústí nad Labem
- District: Litoměřice
- First mentioned: 1227

Government
  - Mayor: Eva Hajná

Area
  - Total: 21.86 km^{2} (8.44 sq mi)
- Elevation: 228 m (748 ft)

Population (2026-01-01)
  - Total: 1,885
  - Density: 86.23/km^{2} (223.3/sq mi)
- Time zone: UTC+1 (CET)
  - Summer (DST): UTC+2 (CEST)
- Postal codes: 411 13, 411 15
- Website: www.mesto-trebenice.cz

Třebenice (Czech pronunciation: [ˈtr̝̊ɛbɛɲɪtsɛ]; German: Trebnitz) is a town in Litoměřice District in the Ústí nad Labem Region of the Czech Republic. It has about 1,900 inhabitants.

== Administrative division ==
Třebenice consists of nine municipal parts (in brackets population according to the 2021 census):

- Třebenice (1,412)
- Kocourov (12)
- Kololeč (92)
- Lhota (21)
- Lipá (23)
- Medvědice (120)
- Mrsklesy (54)
- Sutom (67)
- Teplá (75)

Kocourov, Lhota, Lipá, Medvědice and Mrsklesy form an exclave of the municipal territory.

== Etymology ==
The name Třebenice is derived from the personal name Třeben, meaning "the village of Třeben's people".

== Geography ==
Třebenice is located about 12 kilometres (7 mi) southwest of Litoměřice and 21 km (13 mi) south of Ústí nad Labem. Most of the municipal territory lies in the Central Bohemian Uplands, but the southern part with the town proper lies in the Lower Ohře Table. The highest point is the mountain Lipská hora at 689 m (2,260 ft) above sea level.

The area around the town is known as a deposit of red pyropes, known under the brand name "Czech Garnet".

== History ==
The first written mention of Račice is from 1227. Thanks to the convenient location of the town, the inhabitants made a living from agriculture and later from viticulture and fruit growing. The first Czech fruit processing factory used to operate here.

== Demographics ==
Historical population

Year	Pop.	±%
1869	2,846	—
1880	2,893	+1.7%
1890	2,759	−4.6%
1900	3,002	+8.8%
1910	3,539	+17.9%

Year	Pop.	±%
1921	3,468	−2.0%
1930	3,376	−2.7%
1950	2,269	−32.8%
1961	2,352	+3.7%
1970	2,166	−7.9%

Year	Pop.	±%
1980	2,000	−7.7%
1991	1,753	−12.4%
2001	1,686	−3.8%
2011	1,923	+14.1%
2021	1,876	−2.4%

Source: Censuses

== Transport ==
Třebenice is located on the railway line Most–Litoměřice.

== Sights ==
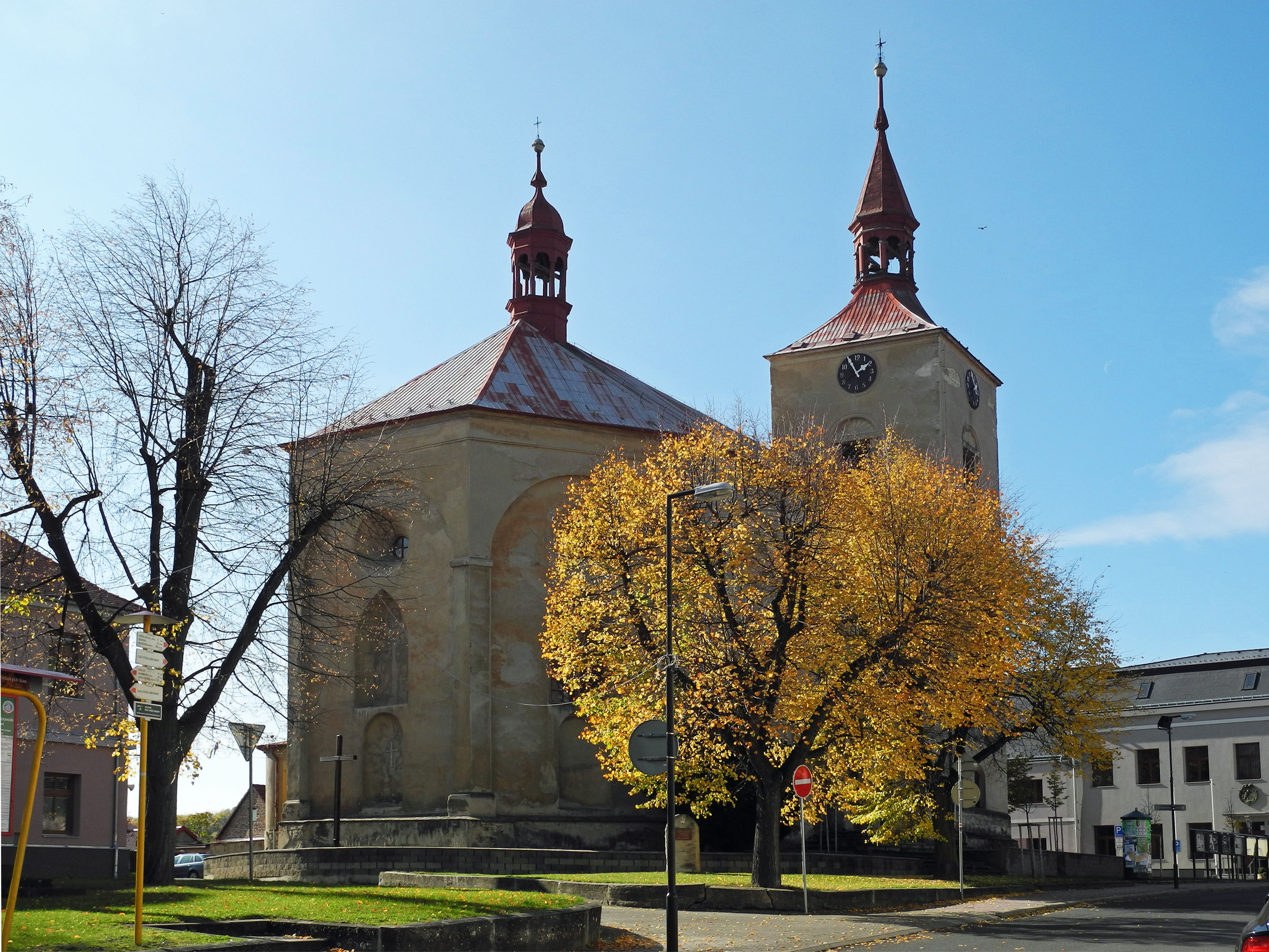
Church of the Nativity of the Virgin Mary

The main landmark of the town centre is the Church of the Nativity of the Virgin Mary. It was built in the Gothic-Renaissance style in 1551–1601. It was modified after the fire in 1669.

A cultural monument is the former Evangelical church. It was built in 1901. Since 1984, the Museum of Czech Garnet has been located there.

== Notable people ==
- Jaro Křivohlavý (1925–2014), psychologist and writer
