= Chandpur-4 =

Constituency of Bangladesh's Jatiya Sangsad

Coordinates: 23.13°N 90.75°E

- Constituency for the Jatiya Sangsad
- District: Chandpur District
- Division: Chittagong Division
- Electorate: 309,776 (2018)

Current constituency
- Created: 1984
- Party: Independent
- Member: Md. Abdul Hannan
- ← 262 Chandpur-3 264 Chandpur-5 →

Chandpur-4 is a constituency represented in the Jatiya Sangsad (National Parliament) of Bangladesh since 2026 by independent politician Md. Abdul Hannan.

== Boundaries ==
The constituency encompasses Faridganj Upazila.

== History ==
The constituency was created in 1984 from the Comilla-22 constituency when the former Comilla District was split into three districts: Brahmanbaria, Comilla, and Chandpur.

Ahead of the 2008 general election, the Election Commission redrew constituency boundaries to reflect population changes revealed by the 2001 Bangladesh census. The 2008 redistricting altered the boundaries of the constituency.

== Members of Parliament ==
Election	Member	Party
1986	Mizanur Rahman Chowdhury	Jatiya Party
1988	Mizanur Rahman Chowdhury	Jatiya Party
1991	Mohammad Abdullah	Bangladesh Nationalist Party
Feb 1996	Mohammad Abdullah	Bangladesh Nationalist Party
Jun 1996	Mohammad Abdullah	Bangladesh Nationalist Party
2001	SA Sultan	Bangladesh Nationalist Party
2008	Harunur Rashid	Bangladesh Nationalist Party
2014	Mohammed Shamsul Hoque Bhuiyan	Awami League
2018	Muhammad Shafiqur Rahman	Awami League
2024	Muhammad Shafiqur Rahman	Awami League
2026	Md. Abdul Hannan	Independent

== Elections ==
=== Elections in the 2010s ===
Shamsul Haque Bhuiyan was elected unopposed in the 2014 general election after opposition parties withdrew their candidacies in a boycott of the election citing a government crackdown and unfair conditions for the election.

=== Elections in the 2000s ===
General Election 2008: Chandpur-4
Party	Candidate	Votes	%	±%
BNP	Harunur Rashid	88,905	51.0	−6.0
AL	Muhammad Shafiqur Rahman	81,838	46.9	−9.0
IAB	Makbul Hossain	2,229	1.3	N/A
BIF	Md. Motiul Islam Miazi	633	0.4	+0.2
Independent	Md. Mahiuddin	428	0.2	N/A
BSD	Alamgir Hossain Dulal	368	0.2	N/A
Majority		7,067	4.1	−15.0
Turnout		174,401	78.0	+4.3
BNP hold				

General Election 2001: Chandpur-4
Party	Candidate	Votes	%	±%
BNP	SA Sultan	92,829	57.0	+7.7
AL	Md. Yusup Gazi	61,740	37.9	−0.1
IJOF	Munsi Mansur Ahmed	5,957	3.7	N/A
Independent	Md. Habibur Rahman Bhuyan	795	0.5	N/A
Bangladesh Samajtantrik Dal (Basad-Khalekuzzaman)	Shahjahan Talukder	705	0.4	N/A
BIF	Md. Nazir Ahmed Pat.	311	0.2	N/A
BKA	Muhammad Hussain Akand	217	0.1	−0.1
Independent	Md. Abdullah	197	0.1	N/A
Bangladesh Progressive Party	Md. Mosharaf Hossain Khan	119	0.1	N/A
Independent	Md. Kaikobad	53	0.0	N/A
Majority		31,089	19.1	+7.8
Turnout		162,923	62.8	+3.8
BNP hold				

=== Elections in the 1990s ===
General Election June 1996: Chandpur-4
Party	Candidate	Votes	%	±%
BNP	Mohammad Abdullah	63,050	49.3	+16.1
AL	Md. Fajlul Haque Sarkar	48,581	38.0	+16.6
JP(E)	Saleh Ahmed	8,401	6.6	−13.2
Jamaat	Habib Ullah	4,114	3.2	−4.0
IOJ	A. Sobahan	2,627	2.1	N/A
Zaker Party	A. N. M. Ibrahim Khalil Azadi	290	0.2	N/A
Bangladesh Samajtantrik Dal (Khalekuzzaman)	Shajahan Talukdar	289	0.2	N/A
Bangladesh Bekar Samaj	Md. Mokhlesur Rahman Patwary	279	0.2	N/A
BKA	Mohammad Hossain Akand	196	0.2	−0.4
Independent	Alam Khan	166	0.1	N/A
Majority		14,469	11.3	+0.5
Turnout		127,993	66.6	+23.1
BNP hold				

General Election 1991: Chandpur-4
Party	Candidate	Votes	%	±%
BNP	Mohammad Abdullah	33,848	32.2	
AL	Abdul Awual	22,527	21.4	
JP(E)	Mizanur Rahman Chowdhury	20,836	19.8	
Jatiya Samajtantrik Dal-JSD	Abdullah Sarkar	19,367	18.4	
Jamaat	Habib Ullah	7,541	7.2	
BKA	Sirajul Islam	649	0.6	
Jatiya Samajtantrik Dal-JSD	A. Latif	213	0.2	
Bangladesh Muslim League (Kader)	Latif Palowan	77	0.1	
Jatiyatabadi Gonotantrik Chashi Dal	Dewan Sirajul Islam Dadon	43	0.0	
Majority		11,321	10.8	
Turnout		105,101	43.5	
BNP gain from JP(E)				
