= Mohammad Abdullah (academic) =

Bangladeshi academic and politician

- মোহাম্মদ আব্দুল্লাহ
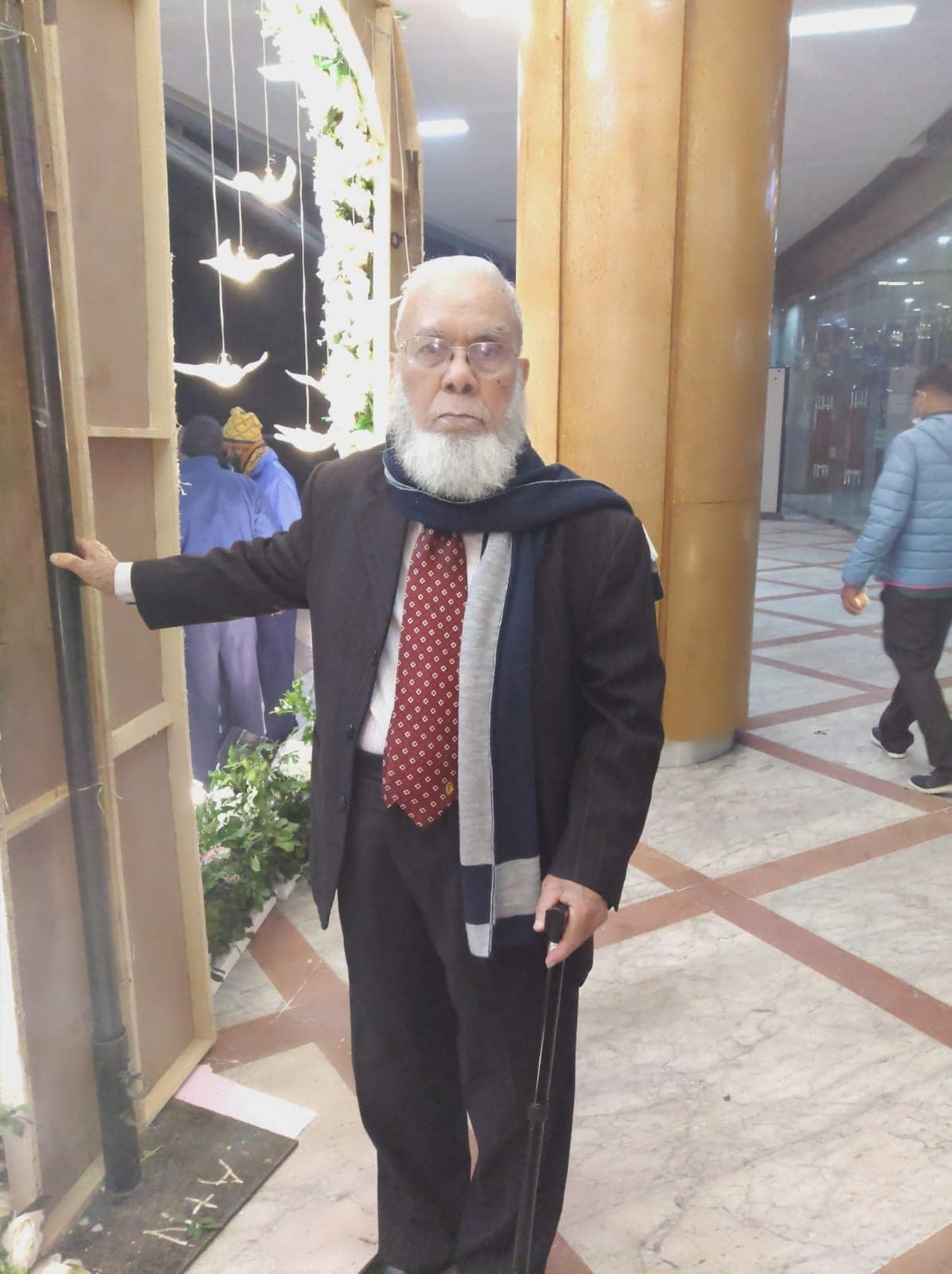
- In 2023

Member of the Bangladesh Parliament for Chandpur-4
- In office 5 March 1991 – 13 July 2001
- Preceded by: Mizanur Rahman Chowdhury
- Succeeded by: SA Sultan

Personal details
- Born: 1 January 1937 (age 89) Chandpur, Bengal Presidency, British India
- Party: Bangladesh Nationalist Party (1991–2001)
- Other political affiliations: Liberal Democratic Party (2006–2019)
- Education: B.Com(Hons) M.Com University of Dhaka F.C.I.S (Chartered Secretary)(U.K)

Mohammad Abdullah (born 1 January 1937) is a retired Bangladeshi politician and academic. After teaching in higher education for over a decade, he served three terms as a member of parliament for constituency Chandpur-4, as a nominee of the Bangladesh Nationalist Party from 1991 to 2001. He later resigned from the party and joined the Liberal Democratic Party.

== Early life ==
Abdullah was born on 1st January 1937 in Chandpur District in the then Bengal Presidency, British India. His father, Alhaj Gazi Nawab Ali, was a scholar in Arabic, philanthropist and Islamic thinker.

Abdullah attended Bajapti Ramani Mohan High School where he passed the Matriculation in 1953. He moved to Dhaka for his higher education and started living there permanently with his two brothers, passing I.Com (Intermediate) at Jagannath College in 1955 and obtaining B.Com. (Hons.) and M.Com. degrees from the University of Dhaka in 1958 and 1959 respectively. Subsequently, he went to London for higher studies and studied to qualify as a chartered secretary; he earned his certificate and became a fellow of the Chartered Institute of Secretaries, London, UK in 1966. He was company secretary of Titas Gas Transmission and Distribution Company Limited and sponsor director of Islami Bank Bangladesh Limited.

== Academic career ==
Before entering politics, Abdullah was an educator. He taught in degree colleges and served as a part-time faculty member in the Departments of Management and Finance at the University of Dhaka for nearly 14 years; he also taught in a secondary modern school in the U.K. from 1964 to 1966 while studying there. He was a member of the Senate of the University of Chittagong from 1991 to 1995. He served as the acting chairman of Manarat International University.

== Political career ==
Abdullah began his political career with the Bangladesh Nationalist Party and in the 1991 general election, he was elected a member of parliament from the constituency 263, Chandpur-4, defeating Mizanur Rahman Chowdhury, a former prime minister under President Ershad. He was elected three times from Chandpur-4 with BNP nomination (in the 5th, the 6th and the 7th parliamentary elections). The BNP also declared him their candidate for 2001 but in a surprise turnabout his nomination was cancelled and S.A. Sultan (thereafter elected as the M.P.) was given the nomination. At that point, Abdullah resigned from the party.

After staying away from politics for some years, Abdullah later on joined the Liberal Democratic Party. In 2006, the Awami League-led mega-alliance told the Liberal Democratic Party to run for 29 parliamentary seats. Abdullah was the nominee for Chandpur-4. In June 2019, Abdullah resigned from the Liberal Democratic Party and politics in June 2019.
