= SA Sultan =

Bangladeshi politician

- এস এ সুলতান

Member of the Bangladesh Parliament for Chandpur-4
- In office 28 October 2001 – 27 October 2006
- Preceded by: Mohammad Abdullah
- Succeeded by: Harunur Rashid

President of Bangladesh Football Federation
- In office 26 November 2001 – 28 April 2008
- Preceded by: AM Azizul Haque
- Succeeded by: Kazi Salahuddin

Personal details
- Born: 24 November 1944 (age 81) Chandpur, Bengal Province, British India
- Party: Bangladesh Nationalist Party

Military service
- Branch/service: Pakistan Air Force
- Rank: Flight lieutenant

SA Sultan (born 24 November 1944) is a Bangladesh Nationalist Party politician and a retired Flight lieutenant of Pakistan Air Force. He served as a Jatiya Sangsad member representing the Chandpur-4 constituency for one term during 2001–2006.

== Early life ==
SA Sultan was born on 24 November 1944 in Chandpur District in the then Bengal Province, British India.

== Career ==
Sultan was elected to parliament from Chandpur-4 as a Bangladesh Nationalist Party candidate in 2001.

=== Bangladesh Football Federation ===
On 26 November 2001, Sultan, a member of the BNP-led coalition government, was appointed as the president of the Bangladesh Football Federation (BFF), replacing AM Azizul Haque, who had been initially elected by the previous Caretaker government. On 20 December 2001, Sultan replaced the elected body of the BFF led by general secretary, Harunur Rashid, with an ad-hoc committee. On 10 January 2002, FIFA banned the BFF for violating FIFA and Asian Football Confederation (AFC) laws that only recognize a democratically elected committee to run a member's football authority. The ban was lifted on 11 February 2002, after the original elected committee was reinstated. Eventually, Rashid resigned alleged to have been forced by Sultan who remained in the president's seat after being unopposed in the 26 April 2003 BFF elections. In June 2007, FIFA extended the tenure of Sultan's executive committee for another year.

During his tenure as president, Sultan failed to hold district and division leagues on a consistent basis, while the country's top-tier league, the Dhaka Premier Division League, was held only four times from 2001 to 2006. Sultan's reign did see some success, with Bangladesh winning the 2003 SAFF Gold Cup as hosts and the introduction of the first professional national league, the B.League, in 2007. Under Sultan's regime, Bangladesh also hosted the 2006 AFC Challenge Cup, the biggest football tournament to have taken place in the country.

On 15 December 2007, Sultan sent his resignation to FIFA, citing to personal reasons. On 16 December 2007, FIFA rejected Sultans resignation and threatened to ban the federation if an executive member resigned before the 2008 polls. Nonetheless, despite facing heavy criticism for his previous decision to reign, along with numerous disputes with journalists, Sultan remained as BFF president until the 2008 elections. On 28 April 2008, Sultan's tenure as president officially ended, with Kazi Salahuddin taking over his role.

== Awards ==
Sultan received the National Sports Award in 2005.
