= Harunur Rashid (Chandpur politician) =

Bangladeshi politician

- হারুনুর রশীদ

Member of the Bangladesh Parliament for Chandpur-4
- In office 25 January 2009 – 24 January 2014
- Preceded by: SA Sultan
- Succeeded by: Mohammed Shamsul Hoque Bhuyan

Personal details
- Party: Bangladesh Nationalist Party

Harunur Rashid is a Bangladesh Nationalist Party politician and a former Jatiya Sangsad member representing the Chandpur-4 constituency during 2009–2014.

== Early life ==
Harunur Rashid was born on 8 June 1957 in Faridganj Upazila, Chandpur District, East Pakistan, Pakistan.

== Career ==
Rashid was elected to parliament from Chandpur-4 as a Bangladesh Nationalist Party candidate in 2009. He boycotted the 2018 general elections.

Rashid lost the 2026 Bangladeshi general election contesting at the Chandpur-4 constituency with 69,155 votes to an independent candidate Md. Abdul Hannan who received 74,175 votes.
