= Mohammed Shamsul Hoque Bhuiyan =

Bangladeshi politician (1948–2024)

Mohammed Shamsul Haque Bhuiyan
- মোহাম্মদ শামছুল হক ভূঁইয়া

Member of the Bangladesh Parliament for Chandpur-4
- In office 5 January 2014 – 30 December 2018
- Preceded by: Harunur Rashid
- Succeeded by: Muhammad Shafiqur Rahman

Personal details
- Born: 1 July 1948 Chandpur District, Chittagong Division, East Bengal, Pakistan
- Died: 2 February 2024 (aged 75) Dhaka, Bangladesh
- Party: Bangladesh Awami League
- Spouse: Anwara Haque
- Parents: Hasmat Ullah (father); Hazera Begum (mother)
- Education: University of Atlanta

Mohammed Shamsul Haque Bhuiyan (1 July 1948 – 2 February 2024) was a Bangladesh Awami League politician who served as a Jatiya Sangsad member representing the Chandpur-4 constituency during 2014–2018. He was a chief engineer of Dhaka City Corporation, a senate member of the University of Dhaka. He was also a businessman. He founded Apollo Group of Industries.

== Early life ==
Bhuiyan was born in Chandpur District on 1 July 1948 to Mohammad Hasmat Ullah and Hazera Begum. He graduated with an MBA from the Institute of Business Administration, University of Dhaka. He then earned his PhD degree.

== Career ==
Bhuiyan was elected to the parliament from Chandpur-4 in 2014 as a Bangladesh Awami League candidate. He was the founder of Apollo University of Science and Technology in Chandpur. He was the chairman of Appolo Group of Companies. He was the chief executive officer of Destiny Group. He was the president of Chandpur District unit of Bangladesh Awami League.

In the 2024 Bangladeshi general election, Bhuiyan contested from Chandpur-4 and Chandpur-3 constituencies as an independent candidate and lost.

== Social work ==
Bhuiyan is a social worker and educationist. With his contribution is established Gridkalindia Hazera Hasmat University College in Faridganj Upazila. Besides, he founded Kaonia Shaheed Habib Ulya High School.

== Death ==
Bhuiyan died in Dhaka on 2 February 2024, at the age of 75.
