= Haribhanga (mango) =

Mango cultivar

Mangifera 'Haribhanga'
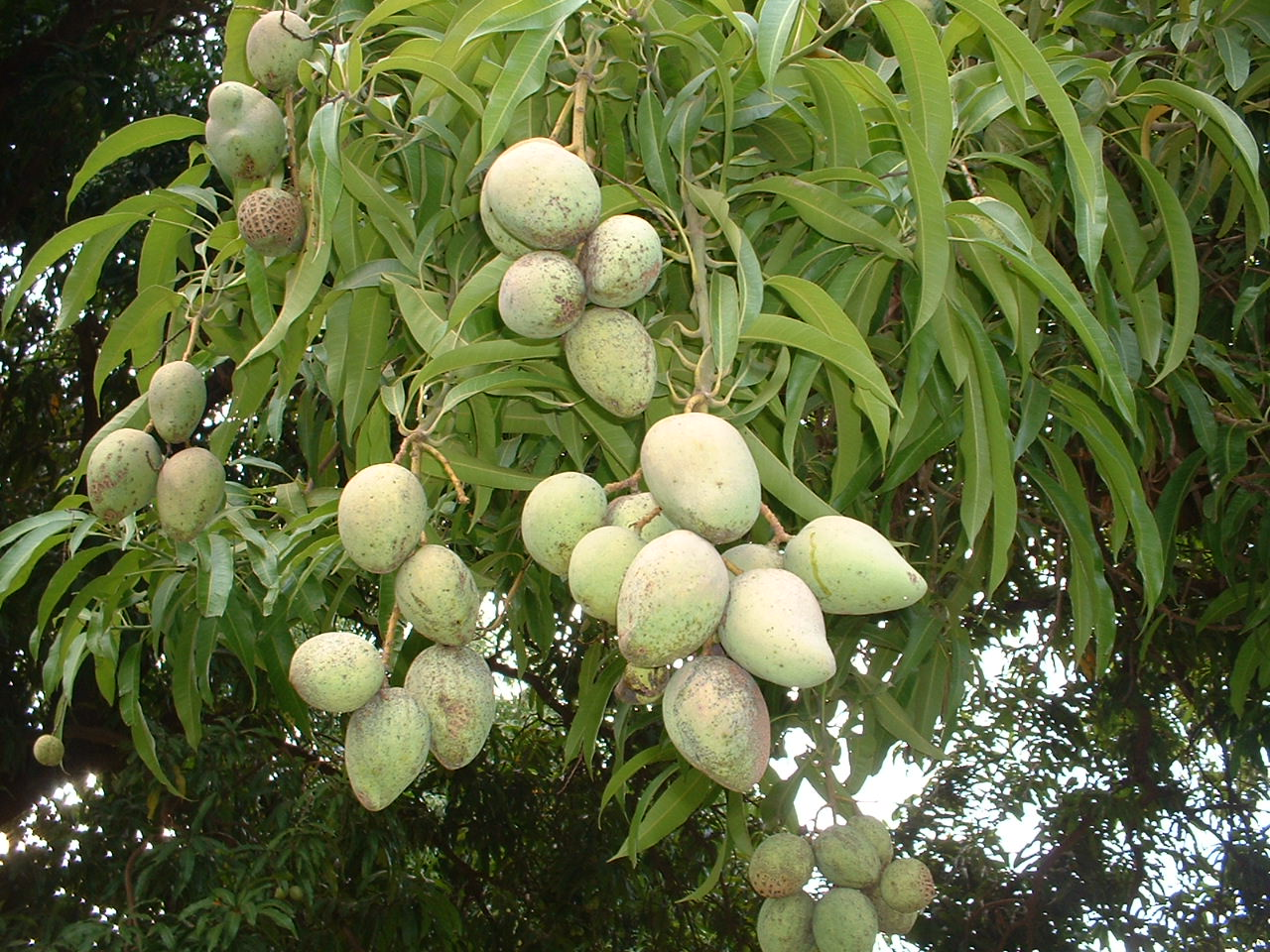
- Unripe mangoes on a mango tree
- Genus: Mangifera
- Cultivar: 'Haribhanga'
- Marketing names: 'Haribhanga'
- Origin: Bangladesh

The Haribhanga mango is a mango cultivar produced in the northwest part of Bangladesh, especially in the Rangpur district. Cultivation of the Haribhanga mango has recently gained popularity among the farmers of northern districts. Locally called Haribhanga, these mangoes are round in shape. Haribhanga is highly fleshy and typically weighs 200 to 400 grams. They have been recorded weighing up to 700 grams. In July 2021, India received 2600 kilos of Haribhanga mangoes from Bangladesh as a memento of friendship between the two neighbouring countries. It was sent through the Petrapole border of Bangaon in West Bengal.

== History ==
Haribhanga later popularized around 2003 by Abdus Salam Sarkar. Haribhanga now sees large-scale cultivation in Mithapukur, Badarganj, Pirganj and Sadar upazilas in Rangpur district as well as other areas of the northern region, the Department of Agriculture Extension (DAE) working to develop of Haribhanga.

== Economy ==
Around 30 thousand people of Mithapukur and others upazilas of Rangpur district are directly dependent on the cultivation and trading of mango. Traders from Dhaka, Rajshahi, Barisal, Chittagong, Khulna, and Sylhet are thronging the local markets to buy Haribhanga from here. In season, this variety of mango sells wholesale at Tk 1800–2000 per maund ($0.27–0.30 per pound).
