= Mithapukur Mosque =

Mosque in Mithapukur, Bangladesh

- মিঠাপুকুর মসজিদ
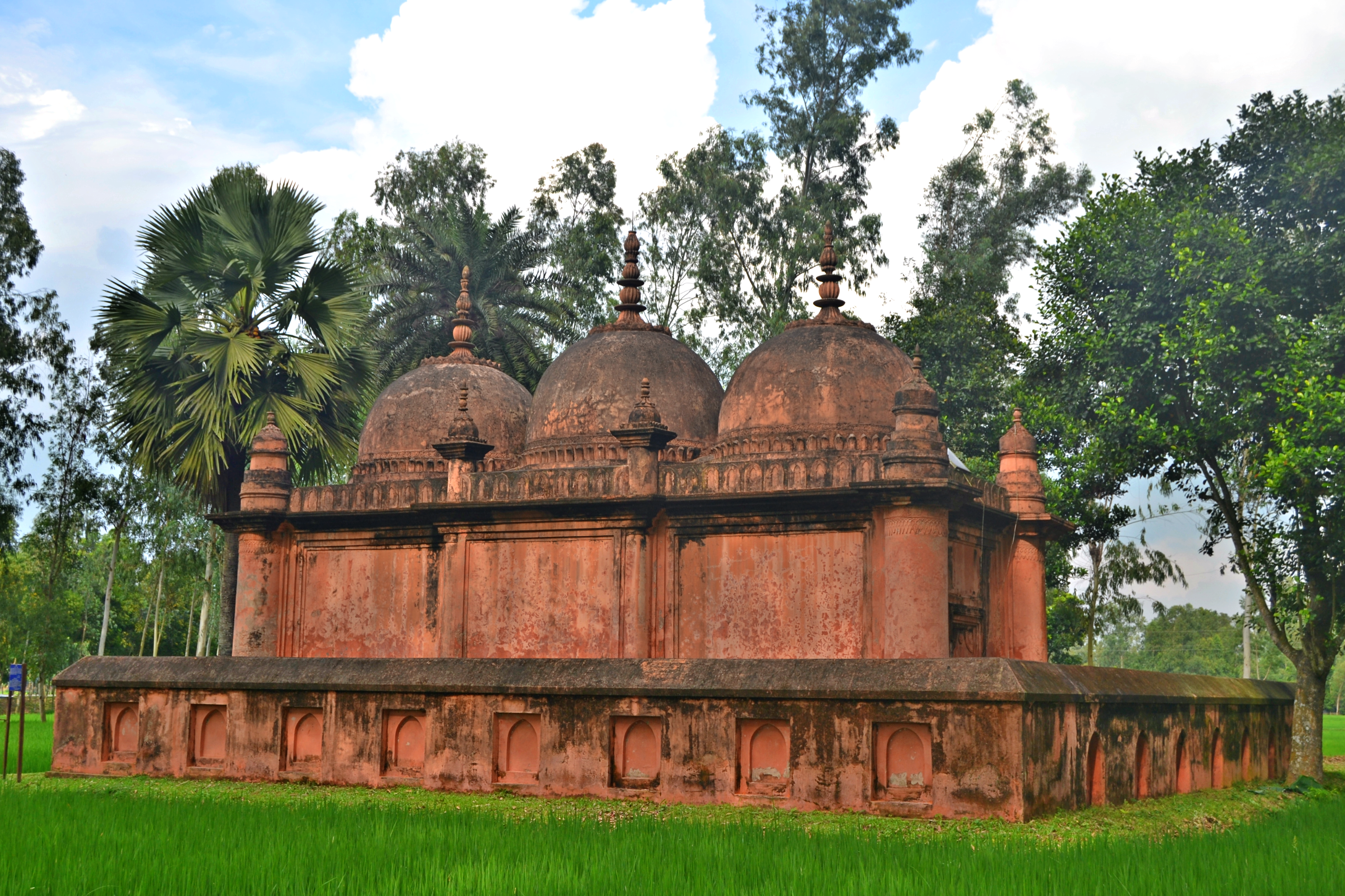

- Location of the mosque in Bangladesh

Religion
- Affiliation: Islam
- Ecclesiastical or organisational status: Mosque
- Status: Active

Location
- Location: Mithapukur, Rangpur District
- Country: Bangladesh
- Coordinates: 25°34′42″N 89°16′10″E

Architecture
- Type: Mosque architecture
- Style: Mughal
- Completed: 1226 AH (1811/1812 CE)
- Dome: Three

The Mithapukur Mosque is an early 19th-century mosque in Mithapukur, in the Rangpur District of Bangladesh. Evidence shows it was built in the Mughal era, and in recent years the Department of Archeology has listed it as an archaeological monument of Bangladesh.

The mosque is situated on the Rangpur-Bogra highway, 4 kilometres (2.5 mi) south of the town of Rangpur District, northwest of Mithapukur at the Upazila headquarters.

== Overview ==
According to inscriptions, the mosque was built by Sheikh Mohammed Asin, the son of Sheikh Sabir and grandson of Sheikh Moazzam. It was completed on a Friday, in 1226 AH (1811/1812 CE).

The mosque has a rectangular base and three domes.

== See also ==
- Islam in Bangladesh
- List of mosques in Bangladesh
