= Shah Md. Soliman Alam =

Bangladeshi politician

Member of Bangladesh Parliament

Personal details
- Party: Jatiya Party (Ershad)
- Other political affiliations: Bangladesh Nationalist Party

Shah Md. Soliman Alam is a Jatiya Party (Ershad) politician and a former member of parliament for Rangpur-5.

== Career ==
Alam was elected to parliament from Rangpur-5 as a Jatiya Party candidate in 2001. He switched to the Bangladesh Nationalist Party in 2013. He was the convener of the Mithapukur Upazila unit of the BNP. In January 2019, he announced he was retiring from politics.
