= Mohammad Harij Uddin Sarker =

Bangladeshi politician

Harij Uddin Sarker
- হারিজ উদ্দিন সরকার

Member of Parliament from Rangpur-5
- In office 1988–1990
- Preceded by: H. N. Ashequr Rahman
- Succeeded by: Hussain Muhammad Ershad

Personal details
- Born: Mohammad Harij Uddin Sarker Rangpur District
- Party: Jatiya Party

Mohammad Harij Uddin Sarker is a politician from the Rangpur District of Bangladesh and an elected member of parliament from Rangpur-5.

== Career ==
Chowdhury was elected to parliament from Rangpur-5 as an independent candidate in 1988.
