= H. N. Ashequr Rahman =

Bangladeshi politician

- এইচ এন আশিকুর রহমান

Member of the Bangladesh Parliament for Rangpur-5
- In office 25 January 2009 – 10 January 2024
- Preceded by: Shah Md. Soliman Alam
- Succeeded by: Zakir Hossain Sarkar
- In office September 1996 – October 2001
- Preceded by: Mizanur Rahman Chowdhury
- Succeeded by: Shah Md. Soliman Alam

Treasurer Bangladesh Awami League
- Incumbent
- Assumed office 21 December 2021

Personal details
- Born: 11 December 1941 (age 84)
- Party: Bangladesh Awami League
- Spouse: Rehana Haque
- Children: 3
- Relatives: Mohammad Abdul Haque (father-in-law)
- Education: University of Rajshahi

H. N. Ashequr Rahman (born 11 December 1941) is a Bangladesh Awami League politician and five-term Jatiya Sangsad member representing the Rangpur-5 constituency. He is the treasurer of the Bangladesh Awami League Central Executive Committee.

== Early life ==
Rahman was born on 11 December 1941 at Faridpur Village in Mithapukur Upazila of Rangpur District to Md. Abdur Rahman and Hamida Khatun. He has a bachelor's and a master's degree from the University of Rajshahi.

== Career ==
Rahman was elected member of parliament from Rangpur-5 as a Bangladesh Awami League candidate. He is the treasurer of the Bangladesh Awami League Central Executive Committee. He is the chairman of Meghna Bank. He is a board of trustees member of East West University.

== Personal life ==
Rahman is married to Rehana Haque, a daughter of Mohammad Abdul Haque, who was a minister, MP and IGP of police. They have a daughter and two sons including Rasheq Rahman, an assistant secretary of the Awami League sub-committee.
