= Md. Abdul Hannan (politician) =

Bangladeshi politician (born 1962)

- মোঃ আবদুল হান্নান

Member of the Bangladesh Parliament for Chandpur-4
- Incumbent
- Assumed office 17 February 2026
- Preceded by: Muhammad Shafiqur Rahman

Personal details
- Born: 27 July 1962 (age 63) Faridganj Upazila, Chandpur District
- Party: Independent

Md. Abdul Hannan is a Bangladeshi politician. He is currently serving as a member of parliament from Chandpur-4 .

== Early life ==
Hannan was born on 27 July 1962 at Faridganj Upazila under Chandpur District.
