= Zakir Hossain Sarkar =

Bangladeshi politician

- জাকির হোসেন সরকার

Member of the Bangladesh Parliament for Rangpur-5
- In office 10 January 2024 – 6 August 2024
- Preceded by: H. N. Ashequr Rahman
- Succeeded by: Md. Golam Rabbani

Personal details
- Born: 4 August 1960 (age 66) Mithapukur, Rangpur District, East Pakistan
- Party: Independent (Awami League)

Zakir Hossain Sarkar (born 4 August 1960) is a Bangladeshi politician. He is a former Jatiya Sangsad member representing the Rangpur-5 constituency as an independent candidate in 2024.

Sarkar was an aspirant for the Awami League nomination for the Rangpur-5 constituency in the 2024 national election but failed to a secure party ticket. Then he decided to contest independently. His candidacy was declared illegal, but he got back his candidature through an appeal with the Bangladesh Election Commission. Previously he served as chairman of Mithapukur Upazila Parishad of Rangpur twice. He resigned from this post on 28 November 2023 to contest in the general election.
