= World Christian Conference =

Annual organization

The World Christian Conference (WCC) is an annual conference that is held near Santa Cruz, California. The stated purpose is to mobilize Christians to become strategically involved in God's plan to make disciples of all nations.

== History ==
The conference started in 1985 as the World Christian Conference for Chinese Graduates (WCCCG). Its conveners saw the need to bring fellow Christians together and challenge them to engage in evangelism throughout the world as well as the need for more workers in North America.

Each year, since 1985, conference attendees from churches on the West Coast and beyond have come together in a forum where biblical teaching is given, models and examples are presented, and practical issues are discussed.

Since 1985, WCC has gained momentum reaching over 400 in attendance each year.

== Speakers ==
- 2014 - Dr. L, Timothy Paul Svoboda
- 2012 - Patrick Fung, Leslyn Musch
- 2011 - Viji Nakka-Cammuaf, Philip Gee
- 2010 - John Lo, Donna Fong
- 2009 - Sabastian Huynh, Michelle Rickett
- 2008 - George Verwer, Jackie Pullinger
- 2007 - Thom Wolf
- 2006 - Loren Cunningham, Keith Wheeler
- 2005 - Jimmy Seibert
- 2004 - Bob Sjogren
- 2003 - Marilyn Laszlo, Lee Yi
- 2002 - Greg Fritz, Chi-Hok Wong
