= Union councils of Satkhira District =

Union councils of Satkhira District (Bengali: সাতক্ষীরা জেলার ইউনিয়ন পরিষদসমূহ) are the smallest rural administrative and local government units in Satkhira District of Bangladesh. The district consists of two municipalities, 7 upazilas, 79 union porishods, 8 thana (police station) and 1436 villages.

== Assasuni Upazila ==
Assasuni has 11 unions, 143 mauzas and 242 villages.

- Shovnali Union
- Budhhata Union
- Kulla Union
- Dargahpur Union
- Baradal Union
- Asasuni Union
- Sreeula Union
- Khajra Union
- Anulia Union
- Protapnagar Union
- Kadakati Union

== Kalaroa Upazila ==
Kalaroa has 12 unions/wards, 123 mauzas/mahallas, and 138 villages.

- Joynagar Union
- Jalalabad Union
- Koyla Union
- Langoljhara Union
- Keragasi Union
- Sonabaria Union
- Chandanpur Union
- Keralkata Union
- Helatala Union
- Kushodanga Union
- Deara Union
- Jugikhali Union

== Kaliganj Upazila ==
Kaliganj has 12 Unions/Wards, 244 Mauzas/Mahallas, and 256 villages.

- Krishnagar Union
- Bishnupur Union
- Champaphul Union
- Dakshin Sreepur Union
- Kushulia Union
- Nalta Union
- Tarali Union
- Bharashimla Union
- Mathureshpur Union
- Dhalbaria Union
- Ratanpur Union
- Moutala Union

== Tala Upazila ==
Tala has 12 Unions/Wards, 150 Mauzas/Mahallas, and 229 villages.

- Nagarghata Union
- Sarulia Union
- Kumira Union
- Dhandia Union
- Islamkati Union
- Tala Union
- Khalishkhali Union
- Magura Union
- Tetulia Union
- Kheshra Union
- Jalalpur Union
- Khalilnagar Union

== Debhata Upazila ==
Debhata has 5 Unions/Wards, 59 Mauzas/Mahallas, and 122 villages.

- Kulia Union
- Parulia Union
- Sakhipur Union
- Noapara Union
- Debhata Union

== Shyamnagar Upazila ==
Shyamnagar has 1 Paurashava (Municipality) 11 Unions/Wards, 127 Mauzas/Mahallas, and 216 villages.

- Bhurulia Union
- Kashimari Union
- Shyamnagar Union
- Nurnagar Union
- Kaikhali Union
- Ramjannagar Union
- Munsigang Union
- Ishwaripur Union
- Burigoalini Union
- Atulia Union
- Padmapukur Union
- Gabura Union

== Satkhira Sadar Upazila ==
Satkhira Sadar has 14 Unions/Wards, 155 Mauzas/Mahallas, and 235 villages.

- Banshdaha Union
- Kushkhali Union
- Baikari Union
- Ghona Union
- Shibpur Union
- Bhomra Union
- Alipur Union
- Dhulihar Union
- Brahmarajpur Union
- Agardari Union
- Jhaudanga Union
- Balli Union
- Labsa Union
- Fingri Union
