= Jalalabad Union, Kalaroa =

Jalalabad জালালাবাদ ইউনিয়ন
- Union
- No. 2 Jalalabad Union Council
- Location within Bangladesh
- Coordinates: 22.8568°N 89.0655°E
- Country: Bangladesh
- Division: Khulna
- District: Satkhira
- Upazila: Kalaroa

Government
  - Chairman: Master Shaukat Ali
  - MP (Satkhira-1): Habibul Islam Habib

Area
  - Total: 18.47 km^{2} (7.13 sq mi)

Population (2011)
  - Total: 17,290
  - Density: 936.1/km^{2} (2,425/sq mi)
- Demonym: Jalalabadi
- Time zone: UTC+6 (BST)
- Website: jallabadup.satkhira.gov.bd

Jalalabad (Bengali: জালালাবাদ) is a union parishad under Kalaroa Upazila, Satkhira District, in the Division of Khulna, southwest part of Bangladesh. It has an area of 18.47 square kilometres and a population of 17,290.

== Geography ==
Jalalabad Union borders Jogikhali Union in the north, Joyanagar Union in the east, Kaila Union to its west and Balli Union (Satkhira Sadar Upazila) and Dhandia Union (Tala Upazila) to its south. It has an area of 17.05 square kilometres.

== Demography ==
Jalalabad has a population of 15,257.

== Administration ==
Jalalabad Union contains 12 villages contained into nine mouzas and nine wards. The villages are:

1. Ahsan Nagar
2. Singhalal
3. Vaidyapur
4. Shankarpur
5. Narayanapur
6. Jalalabad
7. Bantra
8. Buita
9. Ekra
10. Faizullahpur
11. Kashiadanga
12. Hamidpur

== Chairmen ==
Name	Term
Alhaj Akbar Ali Sardar	১৯৭২-১৯৭৭
Alhaj Akbar Ali Sardar	১৯৭৭-১৯৮৪
Shahidul Islam	১৯৮৪-১৯৮৭
Shahidul Islam	১৯৮৭-১৯৯২
Rais Uddin	১৯৯২-১৯৯৭
Shahidul Islam	১৯৯৭-২০০৩
Master Muhammad Shaukat Ali	2003-present

== Economy and culture ==
Jallabad Union has 26 mosques and 4 madrasas including one for women. The four orphanages in Jalalbad are the Jalalabad Orphanage, Vaidyapur Qaumi Orphanage, Narayanapur Baby Orphanage and Shahidul Islam Orphanage in Jalalabad.
