= Kumira High School =

Kumira Multilateral High School
- কুমিরা বহুমুখী উচ্চ বিদ্যালয়

Location
- Satkhira- Khulna road Kumira, Patkelghata Satkhira, Khulna; 9421; Bangladesh; 22.7682°N 89.1728°E

Information
- Type: high school
- Established: 1914
- Founder: Kshitinath Gosh
- School district: Satkhira
- President: Ghosh Shanad Kumar
- Headmaster: Shukkrity Kumar Ghosh
- Executive headteacher: Khogendra Nath Das
- Staff: 4
- Faculty: 15
- Grades: 6 to 10
- Enrollment: 1,100
- Language: Bengali
- Campus size: Large
- Campus type: Rural
- Colours: White, black, red
- Website: kumiramlhighschool.jessoreboard.gov.bd

Kumira Multilateral High School (Bengali: কুমিরা বহুমুখী উচ্চ বিদ্যালয়) is a public high school situated at the centre of kumira bazzar in Tala Upazila, Satkhira district, part of the Khulna division, in south-western Bangladesh. About 1,800 students study there.

The school celebrated 100 years foundation day on 17 and 18 December 2015.

== Students uniform ==
Male follow the dress code below:

- White half shirt with school logo (summer)
- White full shirt with school logo(winter)
- Bottle black pant
- Black belt
- White shoe
- White socks

Female student follow the dress code below:

- White red kamij with school logo(summer)
- White red kamij full with school logo(winter)
