= Prabajpur Shahi Mosque =

Mughal Mosque in Satkhira, Bangladesh

- প্রবাজপুর শাহী মসজিদ
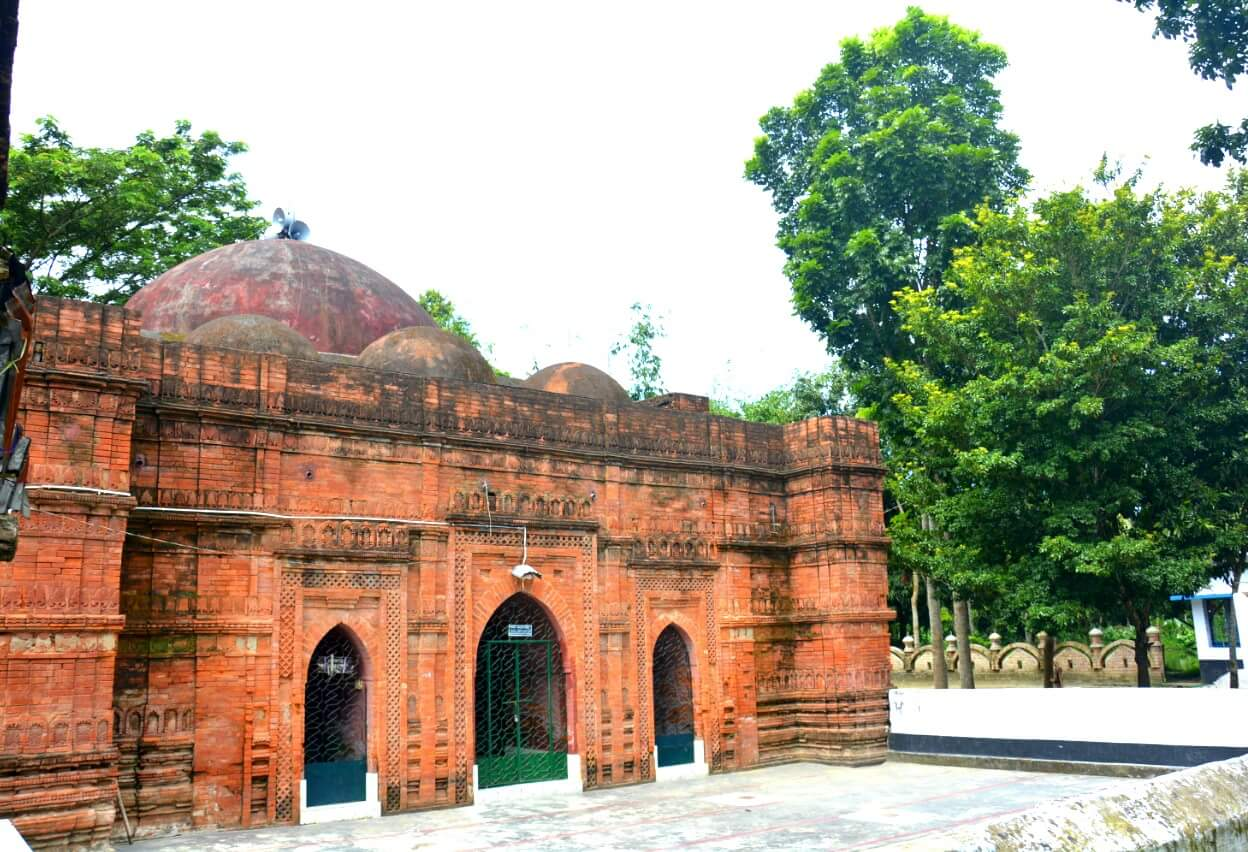

- Location within Bangladesh

Religion
- Affiliation: Islam
- Ecclesiastical or organizational status: Active
- Ownership: Department of Archaeology (Bangladesh)
- Status: Active

Location
- Location: Kaliganj Upazila, Satkhira, Bangladesh
- Interactive map of Prabajpur Shahi Mosque
- Coordinates: 22.4279°N 89.0302°E

Architecture
- Type: Mosque architecture
- Style: Mughal
- Founder: Prabaj Khan
- Established: 1693; 333 years ago

Specifications
- Length: 16 m (52 ft)
- Width: 12.1 m (40 ft)
- Interior area: 6.6 m^{2} (71 ft^{2})
- Dome: 4
- Site area: 66.890 m²
- Materials: Red bricks, Stone

The Prabajpur Shahi Mosque (Bengali: প্রবাজপুর শাহী মসজিদ) is a historic Mughal-era mosque and an architectural monument in Bangladesh. Located in Kaliganj Upazila of Satkhira District, the mosque is situated four kilometres from the Kaliganj Upazila headquarters. Although it is protected and maintained by the Department of Archaeology, it remains an active place of worship. The mosque also attracts tourists and visitors due to its historical and architectural significance.

== History ==
According to archaeological sources, the Mughal Emperor Aurangzeb (r. 1658–1707) ordered the construction of the mosque for his stationed Muslim troops. The task was entrusted to his chief commander, Prabaj Khan, who built the mosque on the banks of the Jamuna River. It was completed on 19 Ramadan, 1104 AH or 2 May 1693 AD. The surrounding village where the soldiers were stationed was named Prabajpur after commander Prabaj Khan, and the mosque itself became known as the Prabajpur Shahi Mosque. Later, Faujdar Nawab Nurullah Khan granted 50 bighas roughly 16.529 acres (66,890 m^{2}) of tax-free land for the mosque's maintenance.

== Architecture ==
The mosque is a fine example of Mughal architecture, characterised by its red hue. It measures 52.4 ft (16.0 m) in length and 39.66 ft (12.09 m) in width. The interior prayer hall is a square space of 21.5 ft (6.6 m). The walls vary in thickness from 5.75 ft (1.75 m) to 7 ft (2.1 m). The main entrance is 4.58 ft (1.40 m) wide. Originally, the structure included a 6.75 ft (2.06 m) wide veranda, which no longer exists. The mosque once had ten doors; the lower portions have since been converted into window-like openings by the addition of thin walls. It features three ornate mihrabs and is topped with four domes. The building continues to draw attention for its elegant ancient architectural style.

== Conservation ==
In 1965, Alhaj Sohrab Ali of Mukundapur village in Kaliganj Upazila undertook the renovation of the mosque. The Probajpur Shahi Mosque has been under the supervision of the Department of Archaeology since 1968. The mosque has lost most of its land to encroachment, with only three bighas still under its control. Legal disputes over the remaining land are pending in the High Court.

== See also ==
- Tetulia Jami Mosque
- Dhanbari Zamindar Bari
- Pirpukur Mosque
