= Kushulia Union =

Kushulia Union কুশুলিয়া ইউনিয়ন
- Union
- Location in Bangladesh
- Coordinates: 22.4367°N 89.0503°E
- Country: Bangladesh
- Division: Khulna Division
- District: Satkhira District
- Upazila: Kaliganj Upazila

Government
  - Type: Union council
- Time zone: UTC+6 (BST)
- Website: kushliaup.satkhira.gov.bd

Kushulia Union (Bengali: কুশুলিয়া ইউনিয়ন) is a union parishad in Kaliganj Upazila of Satkhira District, in Khulna Division, Bangladesh.
