= Dargahpur Union =

Dargahpur Union দরগাহপুর ইউনিয়ন
- Union
- Location in Bangladesh
- Coordinates: 22.5980°N 89.2554°E
- Country: Bangladesh
- Division: Khulna Division
- District: Satkhira District
- Upazila: Assasuni Upazila

Government
  - Type: Union council

Area
  - Total: 30.36 km^{2} (11.72 sq mi)

Population (2011)
  - Total: 24,000
  - Density: 790/km^{2} (2,000/sq mi)
- Time zone: UTC+6 (BST)
- Website: durgapurup.satkhira.gov.bd

Dargahpur Union (Bengali: দরগাহপুর ইউনিয়ন) is a union parishad in Assasuni Upazila of Satkhira District, in Khulna Division, Bangladesh.
