= Anulia Union =

Anulia Union আনুলিয়া ইউনিয়ন
- Union
- Location in Bangladesh
- Coordinates: 22°33′N 89°10′E
- Country: Bangladesh
- Division: Khulna Division
- District: Satkhira District
- Upazila: Assasuni Upazila

Government
  - Type: Union council
- Time zone: UTC+6 (BST)
- Website: anuliaup.satkhira.gov.bd

Anulia Union (Bengali: আনুলিয়া ইউনিয়ন) is a union parishad in Assasuni Upazila of Satkhira District, in Khulna Division, Bangladesh.
