= Tala Union =

Union in Khulna, Bangladesh

Tala Union তালা ইউনিয়ন
- Union
- Tala Union
- Location within Bangladesh
- Coordinates: 22.7518°N 89.2574°E
- Country: Bangladesh
- Division: Khulna
- District: Satkhira
- Upazila: Tala
- Time zone: UTC+6 (BST)
- Website: talaup6.satkhira.gov.bd

Tala (Bengali: তালা) is a union parishad situated at the southwest part of Tala Upazila, in Satkhira District, Khulna Division of Bangladesh.
