= Debhata Union =

Union in Khulna, Bangladesh

Debhata Union দেবহাটা ইউনিয়ন
- Union
- Debhata Union
- Location within Bangladesh
- Country: Bangladesh
- Division: Khulna
- District: Satkhira
- Upazila: Debhata
- Time zone: UTC+6 (BST)
- Website: debhataup.satkhira.gov.bd

Debhata (Bengali: দেবহাটা) is a union parishad situated at the southwest part of Debhata Upazila, Satkhira District, Khulna Division of Bangladesh.
