= Tarali Union =

Tarali Union তারালী ইউনিয়ন
- Union
- Location in Bangladesh
- Coordinates: 22°29′18″N 89°3′31″E
- Country: Bangladesh
- Division: Khulna Division
- District: Satkhira District
- Upazila: Kaliganj Upazila

Government
  - Type: Union council
- Time zone: UTC+6 (BST)
- Website: tarailup.satkhira.gov.bd

Tarali Union (Bengali: তারালী ইউনিয়ন) is a union parishad in Kaliganj Upazila of Satkhira District, in Khulna Division, Bangladesh.
