= Budhhata Union =

Budhhata Union বুধহাটা ইউনিয়ন
- Union
- Location in Bangladesh
- Coordinates: 22.6093°N 89.1534°E
- Country: Bangladesh
- Division: Khulna Division
- District: Satkhira District
- Upazila: Assasuni Upazila

Government
  - Type: Union council

Area
  - Total: 20.58 km^{2} (7.95 sq mi)

Population (2011)
  - Total: 30,263
  - Density: 1,471/km^{2} (3,809/sq mi)
- Time zone: UTC+6 (BST)
- Website: budhhataup.satkhira.gov.bd

Budhhata Union (Bengali: বুধহাটা ইউনিয়ন) is a union parishad in Assasuni Upazila of Satkhira District, in Khulna Division, Bangladesh.
