= Khalilnagar Union =

Union in Khulna, Bangladesh

Khalilnagar Union খলিলনগর ইউনিয়ন
- Union
- Khalilnagar Union
- Location within Bangladesh
- Coordinates: 22.7330°N 89.2970°E
- Country: Bangladesh
- Division: Khulna
- District: Satkhira
- Upazila: Tala
- Time zone: UTC+6 (BST)
- Website: khalilnagarup12.satkhira.gov.bd

Khalilnagar (Bengali: খলিলনগর) is a union parishad situated at the southwest part of Tala Upazila, in Satkhira District, Khulna Division of Bangladesh.
