= Kadakati Union =

Kadakati Union কাদাকাটি ইউনিয়ন
- Union
- Location in Bangladesh
- Coordinates: 22.5674°N 89.2184°E
- Country: Bangladesh
- Division: Khulna Division
- District: Satkhira District
- Upazila: Assasuni Upazila

Government
  - Type: Union council
- Time zone: UTC+6 (BST)
- Website: kadakatiup.satkhira.gov.bd

Kadakati Union (Bengali: কাদাকাটি ইউনিয়ন) is a union parishad in Assasuni Upazila of Satkhira District, in Khulna Division, Bangladesh.
