= Noapara Union =

Union in Khulna, Bangladesh

Noapara Union নওয়াপাড়া ইউনিয়ন
- Union
- Noapara Union
- Location within Bangladesh
- Coordinates: 22.5502°N 89.0100°E
- Country: Bangladesh
- Division: Khulna
- District: Satkhira
- Upazila: Debhata
- Time zone: UTC+6 (BST)
- Website: noaparaup.satkhira.gov.bd

Noapara (Bengali: নওয়াপাড়া) is a union parishad situated at the southwest part of Debhata Upazila, Satkhira District, Khulna Division of Bangladesh.
