= Khalishkhali Union =

Union in Khulna, Bangladesh

Khalishkhali Union খলিশখালী ইউনিয়ন
- Union
- Khalishkhali Union
- Country: Bangladesh
- Division: Khulna
- District: Satkhira
- Upazila: Tala
- Time zone: UTC+6 (BST)
- Website: khalishkhaliup9.satkhira.gov.bd

Khalishkhali (Bengali: খলিশখালী) is a union parishad situated at the southwest part of Tala Upazila, in Satkhira District, Khulna Division of Bangladesh.
