= Protapnagar Union =

Protapnagar Union প্রতাপনগর ইউনিয়ন
- Union
- Location in Bangladesh
- Coordinates: 22.382°N 89.221°E
- Country: Bangladesh
- Division: Khulna Division
- District: Satkhira District
- Upazila: Assasuni Upazila

Government
  - Type: Union council
- Time zone: UTC+6 (BST)
- Website: pratapnagarup.satkhira.gov.bd

Protapnagar Union (Bengali: প্রতাপনগর ইউনিয়ন) is a union parishad in Assasuni Upazila of Satkhira District, in Khulna Division, Bangladesh.

Pratapnagar is a village in the south-western part of Bangladesh near the Sundarbans in Assasuni Upazila, Satkhira District. The village is surrounded by big rivers and numerous canals. Pratapnagar is named after Raja Pratapaditya.

Pratapnagar Jame Mosque (1703) is dated back to Mughal Emperor Aurangzeb.

== See also ==
- List of villages in Bangladesh
