= Champaphul Union =

Champaphul Union চাম্পাফুল ইউনিয়ন
- Union
- Location in Bangladesh
- Coordinates: 22.5142°N 89.1270°E
- Country: Bangladesh
- Division: Khulna Division
- District: Satkhira District
- Upazila: Kaliganj Upazila

Government
  - Type: Union council
- Time zone: UTC+6 (BST)
- Website: champaphulup.satkhira.gov.bd

Champaphul Union (Bengali: চাম্পাফুল ইউনিয়ন) is a union parishad in Kaliganj Upazila of Satkhira District, in Khulna Division, Bangladesh.
