= Sreeula Union =

Sreeula Union শ্রীউলা ইউনিয়ন
- Union
- Location in Bangladesh
- Country: Bangladesh
- Division: Khulna Division
- District: Satkhira District
- Upazila: Assasuni Upazila

Government
  - Type: Union council
- Time zone: UTC+6 (BST)
- Website: sreeulaup.satkhira.gov.bd

Sreeula Union (Bengali: শ্রীউলা ইউনিয়ন) is a union parishad in Assasuni Upazila of Satkhira District, in Khulna Division, Bangladesh.
