= Bishnupur Union =

Bishnupur Union বিষ্ণুপুর ইউনিয়ন
- Union
- Location in Bangladesh
- Coordinates: 22.4449°N 89.1162°E
- Country: Bangladesh
- Division: Khulna Division
- District: Satkhira District
- Upazila: Kaliganj Upazila

Government
  - Type: Union council
- Time zone: UTC+6 (BST)
- Website: bishnupurup.satkhira.gov.bd

Bishnupur Union (Bengali: বিষ্ণুপুর ইউনিয়ন) is a union parishad in Kaliganj Upazila of Satkhira District, in Khulna Division, Bangladesh.
