= Islamkati Union =

Union in Khulna, Bangladesh

Islamkati Union ইসলামকাটি ইউনিয়ন
- Union
- Islamkati Union
- Location within Bangladesh
- Coordinates: 22.7469°N 89.2327°E
- Country: Bangladesh
- Division: Khulna
- District: Satkhira
- Upazila: Tala
- Time zone: UTC+6 (BST)
- Website: islamkatiup7.satkhira.gov.bd

Islamkati (Bengali: ইসলামকাটি) is a union parishad situated at the southwest part of Tala Upazila, in Satkhira District, Khulna Division of Bangladesh.
