= Bharashimla Union =

Bharashimla Union ভাড়াশিমলা ইউনিয়ন
- Union
- Location in Bangladesh
- Coordinates: 22.4828°N 89.0090°E
- Country: Bangladesh
- Division: Khulna Division
- District: Satkhira District
- Upazila: Kaliganj Upazila

Government
  - Type: Union council
- Time zone: UTC+6 (BST)
- Website: bharasimlaup.satkhira.gov.bd

Bharashimla Union (Bengali: ভাড়াশিমলা ইউনিয়ন) is a union parishad in Kaliganj Upazila of Satkhira District, in Khulna Division, Bangladesh.
