= Kulla Union =

Kulla Union কুল্যা ইউনিয়ন
- Union
- Location in Bangladesh
- Coordinates: 22.6226°N 89.1620°E
- Country: Bangladesh
- Division: Khulna Division
- District: Satkhira District
- Upazila: Assasuni Upazila

Government
  - Type: Union council

Area
  - Total: 20.58 km^{2} (7.95 sq mi)

Population (2011)
  - Total: 44,283
  - Density: 2,152/km^{2} (5,573/sq mi)
- Time zone: UTC+6 (BST)
- Website: kullaup.satkhira.gov.bd

Kulla Union (Bengali: কুল্যা ইউনিয়ন) is a union parishad in Assasuni Upazila of Satkhira District, in Khulna Division, Bangladesh.
