= Nagarghata Union =

Union in Khulna, Bangladesh

Nagarghata Union নগরঘাটা ইউনিয়ন
- Union
- Nagarghata Union
- Country: Bangladesh
- Division: Khulna
- District: Satkhira
- Upazila: Tala
- Time zone: UTC+6 (BST)
- Website: nagarghataup1.satkhira.gov.bd

Nagarghata (Bengali: নগরঘাটা) is a union parishad situated at the southwest part of Tala Upazila, in Satkhira District, Khulna Division of Bangladesh.
