= Tetulia Union =

Union in Khulna, Bangladesh

Tetulia Union তেতুলিয়া ইউনিয়ন
- Union
- Tetulia Union
- Location within Bangladesh
- Coordinates: 22.7976°N 89.2279°E
- Country: Bangladesh
- Division: Khulna
- District: Satkhira
- Upazila: Tala
- Time zone: UTC+6 (BST)
- Website: tentuliaup5.satkhira.gov.bd

Tetulia (Bengali: তেতুলিয়া) is a union parishad situated at the southwest part of Tala Upazila, in Satkhira District, Khulna Division of Bangladesh.
