= Baikari Union =

Baikari Union বৈকারী ইউনিয়ন
- Union
- Baikari Union
- Location within Bangladesh
- Coordinates: 22.43°N 89.05°E
- Country: Bangladesh
- Division: Khulna
- District: Satkhira
- Upazila: Satkhira Sadar
- Time zone: UTC+6 (BST)
- Website: baikariup.satkhira.gov.bd

Baikari (Bengali: বৈকারী) is a union parishad under Satkhira Sadar Upazila of Satkhira District in the division of Khulna, Bangladesh.
