= Dakshin Sreepur Union =

Dakshin Sreepur Union দক্ষিণ শ্রীপুর ইউনিয়ন
- Union
- Location in Bangladesh
- Coordinates: 22.4531°N 89.0844°E
- Country: Bangladesh
- Division: Khulna Division
- District: Satkhira District
- Upazila: Kaliganj Upazila

Government
  - Type: Union council
- Time zone: UTC+6 (BST)
- Website: dakshinsreepurup.satkhira.gov.bd

Dakshin Sreepur Union (Bengali: দক্ষিণ শ্রীপুর ইউনিয়ন) is a union parishad in Kaliganj Upazila of Satkhira District, in Khulna Division, Bangladesh.
