= Khajra Union =

Khajra Union খাজরা ইউনিয়ন
- Union
- Location in Bangladesh
- Coordinates: 22.4688°N 89.2563°E
- Country: Bangladesh
- Division: Khulna Division
- District: Satkhira District
- Upazila: Assasuni Upazila

Government
  - Type: Union council
- Time zone: UTC+6 (BST)
- Website: khajraup.satkhira.gov.bd

Khajra Union (Bengali: খাজরা ইউনিয়ন) is a union parishad in Assasuni Upazila of Satkhira District, in Khulna Division, Bangladesh.
