= Sarulia Union =

Union in Khulna, Bangladesh

Sarulia Union সরুলিয়া ইউনিয়ন
- Union
- Sarulia Union
- Country: Bangladesh
- Division: Khulna
- District: Satkhira
- Upazila: Tala
- Time zone: UTC+6 (BST)
- Website: saruliaup3.satkhira.gov.bd

Sarulia (Bengali: সরুলিয়া) is a union parishad situated at the southwest part of Tala Upazila, in Satkhira District, Khulna Division of Bangladesh.
