= Parulia Union =

Union in Khulna, Bangladesh

Parulia Union পারুলিয়া ইউনিয়ন
- Union
- Parulia Union
- Location within Bangladesh
- Coordinates: 22.6075°N 89.0007°E
- Country: Bangladesh
- Division: Khulna
- District: Satkhira
- Upazila: Debhata
- Time zone: UTC+6 (BST)
- Website: paruliaup.satkhira.gov.bd

Parulia (Bengali: পারুলিয়া) is a union parishad situated at the southwest part of Debhata Upazila, Satkhira District, Khulna Division of Bangladesh.
