= Magura Union, Tala =

Union in Khulna, Bangladesh

Magura Union মাগুরা ইউনিয়ন
- Union
- Magura Union
- Country: Bangladesh
- Division: Khulna
- District: Satkhira
- Upazila: Tala
- Time zone: UTC+6 (BST)
- Website: maguraup8.satkhira.gov.bd

Magura (Bengali: মাগুরা) is a union parishad situated at the southwest part of Tala Upazila, in Satkhira District, Khulna Division of Bangladesh.
