= Sakhipur Union =

Union in Khulna, Bangladesh

Sakhipur Union সখিপুর ইউনিয়ন
- Union
- Sakhipur Union
- Location within Khulna division Location within Bangladesh
- Country: Bangladesh
- Division: Khulna
- District: Satkhira
- Upazila: Debhata
- Time zone: UTC+6 (BST)
- Website: sakhipurup.satkhira.gov.bd

Sakhipur (Bengali: সখিপুর) is a union parishad situated at the southwest part of Debhata Upazila, Satkhira District, Khulna Division of Bangladesh.
