= Jalalpur Union =

Union in Khulna, Bangladesh

Jalalpur Union জালালপুর ইউনিয়ন
- Union
- Jalalpur Union
- Location within Bangladesh
- Coordinates: 22.7088°N 89.2586°E
- Country: Bangladesh
- Division: Khulna
- District: Satkhira
- Upazila: Tala
- Time zone: UTC+6 (BST)
- Website: jalalpurup11.satkhira.gov.bd

Jalalpur (Bengali: জালালপুর) is a union parishad situated at the southwest part of Tala Upazila, in Satkhira District, Khulna Division of Bangladesh.
