= Shovnali Union =

Shovnali Union শোভনালী ইউনিয়ন
- Union
- Location in Bangladesh
- Coordinates: 22.5612°N 89.0948°E
- Country: Bangladesh
- Division: Khulna Division
- District: Satkhira District
- Upazila: Assasuni Upazila

Government
  - Type: Union council

Area
  - Total: 33.33 km^{2} (12.87 sq mi)

Population (2011)
  - Total: 33,294
  - Density: 998.9/km^{2} (2,587/sq mi)
- Time zone: UTC+6 (BST)
- Website: sobhnaliup.satkhira.gov.bd

Shovnali Union (Bengali: শোভনালী ইউনিয়ন) is a union parishad in Assasuni Upazila of Satkhira District, in Khulna Division, Bangladesh.
