= Shampa Goswami =

Bangladeshi human rights activist

- শম্পা গোস্বামী
- Born: Debhata Upazila, Satkhira District, Khulna Division, Bangladesh
- Occupations: Teacher; Human rights activist
- Years active: 2006–present
- Organization(s): Odhikar; Prerona
- Known for: Promoting women's rights in Satkhira District

Shampa Goswami (Bengali: শম্পা গোস্বামী) is a Bangladeshi human rights activist and teacher. After working for the non-governmental organisation Odhikar, where she focused on violence against women, Goswami went on to establish Prerora, a human rights organisation promoting human rights in Satkhira District.

== Personal life ==
Goswami was born in Debhata Upazila, Satkhira District, Khulna Division, Bangladesh to Tapan and Anita Goswami. Her father was Bangladeshi, while her mother was from India. Goswami is married to Anand Chatterjee.

Goswami trained as a teacher, and worked at Mojahar Memorial Secondary School in Kaliganj Upazila, later becoming headteacher of its girls' school.

== Activism ==
Alongside her teaching career, Goswami began working for Odhikar, a national human rights organisation that aimed to develop awareness of human rights, in addition to reporting on human rights violations, across Bangladesh. Goswami's work with the organisation focused on supporting female victims of violence and abuse.

Goswami went on to create Prerona Nari Unnayan Sangathan in 2006. The organisation was women-led and focused on supporting vulnerable women living in coastal areas of Satkhira, who faced challenges linked to climate change, gender-based violence and social stigmas, including through providing education, livelihoods, and disaster management.

== Threats and harassment ==
=== 2012 assault ===
Goswami has received threats, harassment and pressure as a result of her human rights work. In May 2011, through her work with Odhikar, she supported a victim of gang rape to file a criminal complaint against the perpetrators in May 2011. On 23 October 2011, Goswami was sexually harassed, followed and threatened by a group of men linked to the perpetrators of the gang rape, who pressured her to rescind the allegation. After Goswami reported the threats against her to the police, she was subsequently suspended from her job as a teacher on 10 September 2012.

=== 2026 criminal charges ===
On 21 August 2026, Goswami was prevented from travelling to Bali, Indonesia to attend a conference, and was informed she had been made subject to travel restrictions, although was not told the reason why. On 20 September, she filed a writ petition to the High Court of Bangladesh challenging the travel ban. On 28 September, Goswami received notice that a police investigation had been ordered by the Ministry of Home Affairs on 17 September amid allegations of corruption and misuse of public funds.

On 12 October 2026, Goswami was informed that she was additionally under investigation for sedition under section 124a of the Penal Code of Bangladesh. This followed a criminal complaint filed on 29 September in Shyamnagar Upazila which accused Goswami of making "provocative remarks" against the Bangladeshi government during a public gathering at her office on 14 August. The allegations against Goswami included that she had misappropriated funds given to Prerona; had carried out money laundering in India as well as land grabs in Bangladesh; that she was close to members of the Awami League, a banned political party; that she was an agent of the Research & Analysis Wing, India's external intelligence agency; and that she had illegal dual citizenship of Bangladesh and India.

Goswami denied the sedition charges against her, stating her dual citizenship was acquired legally through her mother being from India, and stated that evidence used against her was either fake or made using artificial intelligence. She claimed she had been placed under police surveillance as a result of the allegations.

== Response ==
The World Organisation Against Torture and the International Federation for Human Rights had in 2012 called for Bangladeshi authorities to ensure the "physical and psychological integrity" of Goswami and to ensure an "effective and impartial" investigation into those harassing her.

Front Line Defenders expressed concern about the 2026 sedition case filed against Goswami, stating that it appeared to be "directly connected" with her human rights work. It called on Bangladeshi authorities to drop all its criminal investigations into Goswami and to end its harassment of her. Human Rights Forum Bangladesh expressed its "deep concern" at the sedition case, as well as threats to her safety following news of the charges.
