= Alipur Union =

Union council in Khulna, Bangladesh

Alipur Union আলীপুর ইউনিয়ন
- Union
- Alipur Union
- Location within Bangladesh
- Coordinates: 22.43°N 89.05°E
- Country: Bangladesh
- Division: Khulna
- District: Satkhira
- Upazila: Satkhira Sadar
- Time zone: UTC+6 (BST)
- Website: alipurup.satkhira.gov.bd

Alipur (Bengali: আলীপুর) is a union parishad under Satkhira Sadar Upazila of Satkhira District in the division of Khulna, Bangladesh.

== Area and land use ==
Alipore Union has an area of 5930.529 acres. Amount of single crop land: 125 hectares, amount of double crop land: 3,975 hectares, amount of three crop land: 1,529 hectares.

== Population ==
As of 2013, Alipore Union had a population of 31,120. Of these, 16,285 are males and 15,835 are females.

== Administrative structure ==
Union Parishad No. 7 under Alipur Union Satkhira Sadar Upazila. There are four hat-bazaars in the union.

== Education system ==
Alipore Union has an average literacy rate of 71%. The union has 2 colleges, 2 secondary schools, 1 lower secondary school, 3 madrasas (2 orphanages) and 11 primary schools. [1]

== Religious infrastructure ==
Alipore Union has 45 mosques and 2 temples.
