= Koyla Union =

Koyla Union কয়লা ইউনিয়ন
- Union
- Koyla Union
- Location within Bangladesh
- Coordinates: 22.8588°N 89.0529°E
- Country: Bangladesh
- Division: Khulna
- District: Satkhira
- Upazila: Kalaroa
- Time zone: UTC+6 (BST)
- Website: kailaup.satkhira.gov.bd

Koyla (Bengali: কয়লা) is a union parishad under Kalaroa Upazila, Satkhira District, in the Division of Khulna, southwest part of Bangladesh.
