= Nurnagar Union =

Union in Khulna, Bangladesh

Nurnagar Union নূরনগর ইউনিয়ন
- Union
- Location in Bangladesh
- Country: Bangladesh
- Division: Khulna Division
- District: Satkhira District
- Upazila: Shyamnagar Upazila

Government
  - Type: Union council
- Time zone: UTC+6 (BST)
- Website: nurnagarup.satkhira.gov.bd

Nurnagar Union (Bengali: নূরনগর ইউনিয়ন) is a union parishad in Shyamnagar Upazila of Satkhira District, in Khulna Division, Bangladesh.
