= Helatala Union =

Helatala Union হেলাতলা ইউনিয়ন
- Union
- Helatala Union
- Location within Bangladesh
- Coordinates: 22.8845°N 89.0267°E
- Country: Bangladesh
- Division: Khulna
- District: Satkhira
- Upazila: Kalaroa
- Time zone: UTC+6 (BST)
- Website: helatalaup.satkhira.gov.bd

Helatala (Bengali: হেলাতলা) is a union parishad under Kalaroa Upazila, Satkhira District, in the Division of Khulna, southwest part of Bangladesh.
