= Kazi Ertaza Hassan =

Bangladeshi businessman, politician, and entrepreneur

Kazi Ertaza Hassan CIP
- কাজী এরতেজা হাসান

Director of Federation of Bangladesh Chambers of Commerce & Industries

Personal details
- Born: Satkhira, Bangladesh
- Education: Ph.D
- Alma mater: University of Dhaka

Kazi Ertaza Hassan is a businessman, politician, and entrepreneur. He is the chairperson of Vorer Pata Group of Industries. And he is a director of the Federation of Bangladesh Chambers of Commerce & Industries (FBCCI). He is editor of Daily Vorer Pata and People's time. He was former president of Rangpur Riders. And vice chairman of Sylhet Thunders. He is the board of chairman of Bangladesh Economic Zone Investors Association (BEZIA). and he was also vice president of International Relations of The Indo-Italian Chamber of Commerce and Industry (IICCI). He was the acting president of Satkhira District Awami League.

== Career ==
Kazi Ertaza Hassan is a Bangladeshi businessman, publisher, and elected director of the Federation of Bangladesh Chambers of Commerce and Industry. He is also the publisher and editor of the vernacular daily Bhorer Pata.

In March 2024, Hassan was arrested in connection with a fraud case related to a disputed land procurement deal involving NUB. The case, filed in January 2024, alleged that NUB officials had purchased a 0.669-hectare plot at Ashiyan City in Dhaka in 2013, agreeing to pay a total of Tk 500 million but failing to settle Tk 200 million of the payment. The case further alleged that in 2019, NUB officials forged documents to claim full payment had been made. The land dispute also led to the arrests of NUB Trustee Board Chairman Prof. Abu Yousuf Md Abdullah and another official, Reazul Alam.

== Awards ==
- 'Doctor of Humanity' Award
