= Chandanpur Union =

Chandanpur Union চন্দনপুর ইউনিয়ন
- Union
- Chandanpur Union
- Location within Bangladesh
- Coordinates: 22.9068°N 88.9335°E
- Country: Bangladesh
- Division: Khulna
- District: Satkhira
- Upazila: Kalaroa
- Time zone: UTC+6 (BST)
- Website: chandanpurup.satkhira.gov.bd

Chandanpur (Bengali: চন্দনপুর) is a union parishad under Kalaroa Upazila, Satkhira District, in the Division of Khulna, southwest part of Bangladesh.
