= Bhurulia Union =

Union in Khulna, Bangladesh

Bhurulia Union ভুরুলিয়া ইউনিয়ন
- Union
- Location in Bangladesh
- Coordinates: 22.3681°N 89.0739°E
- Country: Bangladesh
- Division: Khulna Division
- District: Satkhira District
- Upazila: Shyamnagar Upazila

Government
  - Type: Union council
- Time zone: UTC+6 (BST)
- Website: bhuruliaup.satkhira.gov.bd

Bhurulia Union (Bengali: ভুরুলিয়া ইউনিয়ন) is a union parishad in Shyamnagar Upazila of Satkhira District, in Khulna Division, Bangladesh.
