= Kapotaksha River =

River in Bangladesh and India

Coordinates: 22.8777°N 89.1234°E

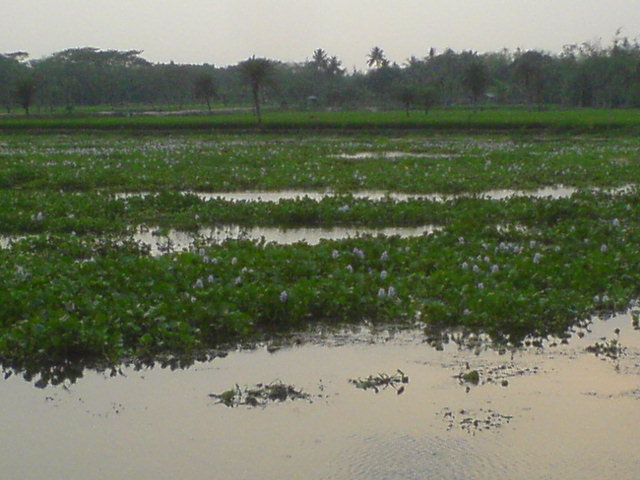
- Native name: কপোতাক্ষ নদ (Bengali)

Location
- Country: Bangladesh; India
- Bangladesh: Kushtia; Meherpur; Chuadanga; Jessore; Jhenaidah; Satkhira; Khulna
- Region: South west

Physical characteristics
- Source
  - location: Mathabhanga River
  - elevation: 8m
- Mouth: Shibsa River
  - location: Sundarban
  - elevation: 0m
- Length: 250 km (160 mi)
- Width
  - maximum: 100 m

Basin features
- River system: Ganges Delta
- Tributaries
  - left: Bhairab River

The Kapotaksha (Sanskrit), or Kobodak (Bengali: কপোতাক্ষ নদ, romanized: Kapōtākṣa Nada), Kabadak, or Kopotakkho, is a river of Bangladesh. The river is famous for upholding the memory of popular Bengali poet Michael Madhusudan Dutt. Poem Kapatakkha Nad is included in the SSC syllabus of Bangladesh.

== Origin ==
Though originated from the Mathabhanga river, the Kopothakho has gotten disconnected from its source. Now it is mainly a branch of Bhairab river. The river flows through Jessore, Satkhira and Khulna districts and finally meets the Kholpetua river in Khulna District. The lower part of the river is tidal.

== In present day ==
The river is shrinking due to encroachment. Different organizations have urged the authorities to take initiatives to save the river.

== In popular culture ==
The Kopothakho first appeared in Bangla literature the famous poem Kapatakkha Nad of Michael Madhusudan Dutt. It was one of the first sonnets of Bengali literature introduced by Dutt. Afterwards many other works been created on it. Kapotaksha Express is a renowned train of Bangladesh Railway runs between Khulna to Rajshahi.
