= Munshiganj Union =

Union in Khulna, Bangladesh

Munshiganj Union মুন্সিগঞ্জ ইউনিয়ন
- Union
- Location in Bangladesh
- Coordinates: 22.2288°N 89.1546°E
- Country: Bangladesh
- Division: Khulna Division
- District: Satkhira District
- Upazila: Shyamnagar Upazila

Government
  - Type: Union council
- Time zone: UTC+6 (BST)
- Website: munshiganjup.satkhira.gov.bd

Munshiganj Union (Bengali: মুন্সিগঞ্জ ইউনিয়ন) is a union parishad in Shyamnagar Upazila of Satkhira District, in Khulna Division, Bangladesh.
