= Jugikhali Union =

Jugikhali Union যুগিখালী ইউনিয়ন
- Union
- Jugikhali Union
- Location within Bangladesh
- Coordinates: 22.8991°N 89.0957°E
- Country: Bangladesh
- Division: Khulna
- District: Satkhira
- Upazila: Kalaroa
- Time zone: UTC+6 (BST)
- Website: jugikhaliup.satkhira.gov.bd

Jugikhali (Bengali: যুগিখালী) is a union parishad under Kalaroa Upazila, Satkhira District, in the Division of Khulna, southwest part of Bangladesh.
