= Keralkata Union =

Keralkata Union কেরালকাতা ইউনিয়ন
- Union
- Keralkata Union
- Location within Bangladesh
- Coordinates: 22.9277°N 89.0033°E
- Country: Bangladesh
- Division: Khulna
- District: Satkhira
- Upazila: Kalaroa
- Time zone: UTC+6 (BST)
- Website: keralkataup.satkhira.gov.bd

Keralkata (Bengali: কেরালকাতা) is a union parishad under Kalaroa Upazila, Satkhira District, in the Division of Khulna, southwest part of Bangladesh.
