= Kakshiyali River =

River in Bangladesh

Coordinates: 22.4768°N 89.0820°E

The Kakshiyali River (Bengali: কাকশিয়ালী নদী) is a canal located in the Satkhira District of Bangladesh.

== History ==
British engineer William Coxhall was in charge of digging this canal.
