= Kalaroa Government College =

- Motto: Read on the name of God
- Type: College
- Established: 1969; 57 years ago
- Affiliations: Board of Intermediate and Secondary Education, Jashore & National University, Bangladesh
- Principal: S. M. Anaruzzaman
- Students: 2700
- Undergraduates: 1700
- Location: Jashore - Satkhira Highway,, Kalaroa, Khulna, 9410, Bangladesh; 22°15′19″N 89°02′33″E
- Campus: Urban
- Colors: Blue and white
- Website: www.kalaroagc.edu.bd

Kalaroa Government College is an educational institution located at Kalaroa Upazila in the Satkhira District of Bangladesh which was established in 1969. The college is currently imparting education at higher secondary and undergraduate levels under the Board of Intermediate and Secondary Education, Jashore, and National University.

== History ==
The college was established in 1969. The main key person in establishing the college was Safiur Rahman and the founding editor was Sheikh Amanullah. The first principal of the college was Mohammad Abdus Sobahan.

In 1988, the Ministry of Education published a gazette where its nationalization was mentioned, and was renamed to Kalaroa Govt. College.

== Academic ==
The college offers Higher Secondary Education under the Jashore Education Board.

It also offers a bachelor's degree in two courses under the National University, Bangladesh.
