= Jhaudanga Union =

Union in Khulna, Bangladesh

Jhaudanga Union ঝাউডাঙ্গা ইউনিয়ন
- Union
- Jhaudanga Union
- Location within Bangladesh
- Coordinates: 22.43°N 89.05°E
- Country: Bangladesh
- Division: Khulna
- District: Satkhira
- Upazila: Satkhira Sadar
- Seat: Satkhira-2
- Time zone: UTC+6 (BST)
- Postal code: 9400
- Website: jhaudangaup.satkhira.gov.bd

Jhaudanga (Bengali: ঝাউডাঙ্গা) is a Union Parishad under Satkhira Sadar Upazila of Satkhira District in the division of Khulna, Bangladesh.
