= Ishwaripur Union =

Union in Khulna, Bangladesh

Ishwaripur Union ঈশ্বরীপুর ইউনিয়ন
- Union
- Location in Bangladesh
- Coordinates: 22.3014°N 89.1122°E
- Country: Bangladesh
- Division: Khulna Division
- District: Satkhira District
- Upazila: Shyamnagar Upazila

Government
  - Type: Union council
- Time zone: UTC+6 (BST)
- Website: ishwaripurup.satkhira.gov.bd

Ishwaripur Union (Bengali: ঈশ্বরীপুর ইউনিয়ন) is a union parishad in Shyamnagar Upazila of Satkhira District, in Khulna Division, Bangladesh.
