= Langoljhara Union =

Langoljhara Union লাঙ্গলঝাড়া ইউনিয়ন
- Union
- Langoljhara Union
- Location within Bangladesh
- Coordinates: 22.8426°N 89.0175°E
- Country: Bangladesh
- Division: Khulna
- District: Satkhira
- Upazila: Kalaroa
- Time zone: UTC+6 (BST)
- Website: langaljharaup.satkhira.gov.bd

Langoljhara (Bengali: লাঙ্গলঝাড়া) is a union parishad under Kalaroa Upazila, Satkhira District, in the Division of Khulna, southwest part of Bangladesh.
