= Betna River =

River in Bangladesh

Coordinates: 22°34′N 89°11′E

The Betna River is located in Bangladesh. It originates in Jessore District, flows through Satkhira and Khulna, where it is called Kalia River, and forms a branch called Dalua River. The Kalia is a tributary of the Kobadak River. The Betna changes its name to Arpangachhia River when it reaches the Sundarbans, and changes it again to the Malancha before flowing into the Bay of Bengal.
