= Keragasi Union =

Union in Khulna, Bangladesh

Keragasi Union কেঁড়াগাছি ইউনিয়ন
- Union
- Keragasi Union
- Location within Bangladesh
- Coordinates: 22.8435°N 88.9930°E
- Country: Bangladesh
- Division: Khulna
- District: Satkhira
- Upazila: Kalaroa
- Time zone: UTC+6 (BST)
- Website: keragachhiup.satkhira.gov.bd

Keragasi (Bengali: কেঁড়াগাছি) is a union parishad under Kalaroa Upazila, Satkhira District, in the division of Khulna, southwest part of Bangladesh.
