= Dhandia Union =

Union in Khulna, Bangladesh

Dhandia Union ধানদিয়া ইউনিয়ন
- Union
- Dhandia Union
- Location within Bangladesh
- Coordinates: 22.8052°N 89.1189°E
- Country: Bangladesh
- Division: Khulna
- District: Satkhira
- Upazila: Tala
- Time zone: UTC+6 (BST)
- Website: dhandiaup1.satkhira.gov.bd

Dhandia (Bengali: ধানদিয়া) is a union parishad situated at the southwest part of Tala Upazila, in Satkhira District, Khulna Division of Bangladesh.
