= Deara Union =

Deara Union দেয়াড়া ইউনিয়ন
- Union
- Deara Union
- Location within Bangladesh
- Coordinates: 23.1664°N 89.1383°E
- Country: Bangladesh
- Division: Khulna
- District: Satkhira
- Upazila: Kalaroa
- Time zone: UTC+6 (BST)
- Website: dearaup.satkhira.gov.bd

Deara (Bengali: দেয়াড়া) is a union parishad under Kalaroa Upazila, Satkhira District, in the Division of Khulna, southwest part of Bangladesh.
