= A. F. M. Entaz Ali =

Bangladeshi politician

Member of Parliament for Khulna-12
- In office 1973–1975
- Preceded by: Constituency Established
- Succeeded by: Aftabuzzaman

Personal details
- Born: 20 January 1937
- Died: 26 January 1998 (aged 61)
- Party: Bangladesh Awami League
- Education: University of Dhaka

A. F. M. Entaz Ali (20 January 1937 – 26 January 1998) was a Bangladeshi lawyer and politician from Satkhira belonging to Bangladesh Awami League. He was a member of the Jatiya Sangsad.

== Biography ==
Entaz Ali was born on 20 January 1937. He was involved in politics during his student life. After completing postgraduate studies from University of Dhaka he started his career as a lawyer. He was an organizer of the Liberation War of Bangladesh. He also took part in the Liberation War of Bangladesh. He was elected as a member of the Jatiya Sangsad from Khulna-12 in 1973.

Entaz Ali died on 26 January 1998 at the age of 61.
