= Kashimari Union =

Union in Khulna, Bangladesh

Kashimari Union কাশিমাড়ী ইউনিয়ন
- Union
- Location in Bangladesh
- Coordinates: 22.3796°N 89.1648°E
- Country: Bangladesh
- Division: Khulna Division
- District: Satkhira District
- Upazila: Shyamnagar Upazila

Government
  - Type: Union council
- Time zone: UTC+6 (BST)
- Website: kashimariup.satkhira.gov.bd

Kashimari Union (Bengali: কাশিমাড়ী ইউনিয়ন) is a union parishad in Shyamnagar Upazila of Satkhira District, in Khulna Division, Bangladesh.
