= Kushodanga Union =

Kushodanga Union কুশোডাঙ্গা ইউনিয়ন
- Union
- Kushodanga Union
- Country: Bangladesh
- Division: Khulna
- District: Satkhira
- Upazila: Kalaroa
- Time zone: UTC+6 (BST)
- Website: kushodangaup.satkhira.gov.bd

Kushodanga (Bengali: কুশোডাঙ্গা) is a union parishad under Kalaroa Upazila, Satkhira District, in the Division of Khulna, southwest part of Bangladesh.
