= Shyamnagar Union =

Union in Khulna, Bangladesh

Shyamnagar Union শ্যামনগর ইউনিয়ন
- Union
- Country: Bangladesh
- Division: Khulna Division
- District: Satkhira District
- Upazila: Shyamnagar Upazila

Government
  - Type: Union council
- Time zone: UTC+6 (BST)
- Website: shyamnagarup.satkhira.gov.bd

Shyamnagar Union (Bengali: শ্যামনগর ইউনিয়ন) is a union parishad in Shyamnagar Upazila of Satkhira District, in Khulna Division, Bangladesh.
