= Tetulia Jami Mosque =

Mosque in Tetulia, Tala Upazila, Bangladesh

- তেতুলিয়া জামে মসজিদ
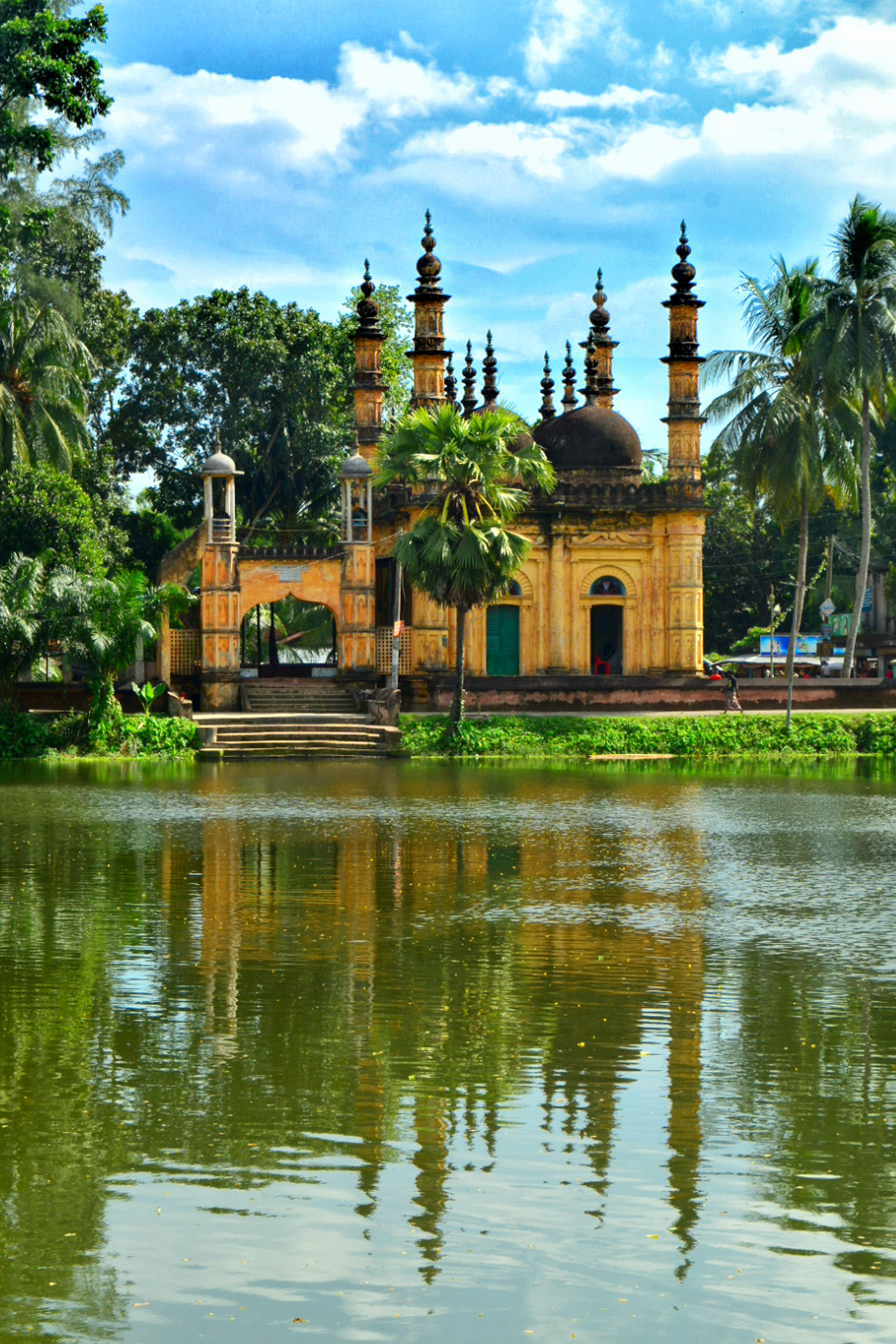

- Location of the mosque in Bangladesh

Religion
- Affiliation: Sunni Islam
- Ecclesiastical or organisational status: Friday mosque
- Status: Active

Location
- Location: Tala Upazila, Satkhira
- Country: Bangladesh
- Coordinates: 22°46′54″N 89°15′05″E

Architecture
- Type: Mosque architecture
- Style: Mughal
- Founder: Khan Bahadur Maulvi Qazi Salamatullah Khan
- Completed: 1859

Specifications
- Dome: Six
- Minaret: Many

The Tetulia Jami Mosque (Bengali: তেতুলিয়া জামে মসজিদ), also known as the Khan Bahadur Salamatullah Mosque or the Tetulia Shahi Mosque, is a Sunni Friday mosque, located in the village of Tetulia (or Tentulia) in Tala Upazila in the Satkhira District of Bangladesh. The founder of the mosque was Khan Bahadur Maulvi Qazi Salamatullah Khan, of the zamindar (feudal-lord) Qazi family of Tetulia, who was also the founder of the mansion known as Salam Manzil (now in ruins) in the vicinity. The six-domed mosque was built in the Mughal style in 1858–59 and resembles those built by Tipu Sultan's descendants, as does the Salam Manzil, now in virtual decay.

In 1982, the front of the decaying "Shingho Doroja" ("Main Door" in the Bengali language) – that is, the gateway and entrance to Salam Manzil – appeared to have inscriptions or patterns on the wall. Walking through the gate, one would find a spacious compound containing a lot of greenery. A very long verandah with a crumbling roof, supported by a twin-pillar system, overlooked the compound. Opening onto the verandah were dilapidated chambers, which used to function as offices in the past, when the mansion was in a working state. In the past, one or more end-rooms of the verandah had housed palkis (palanquins). One particular palki was enormous, and twelve bearers were required to carry it.

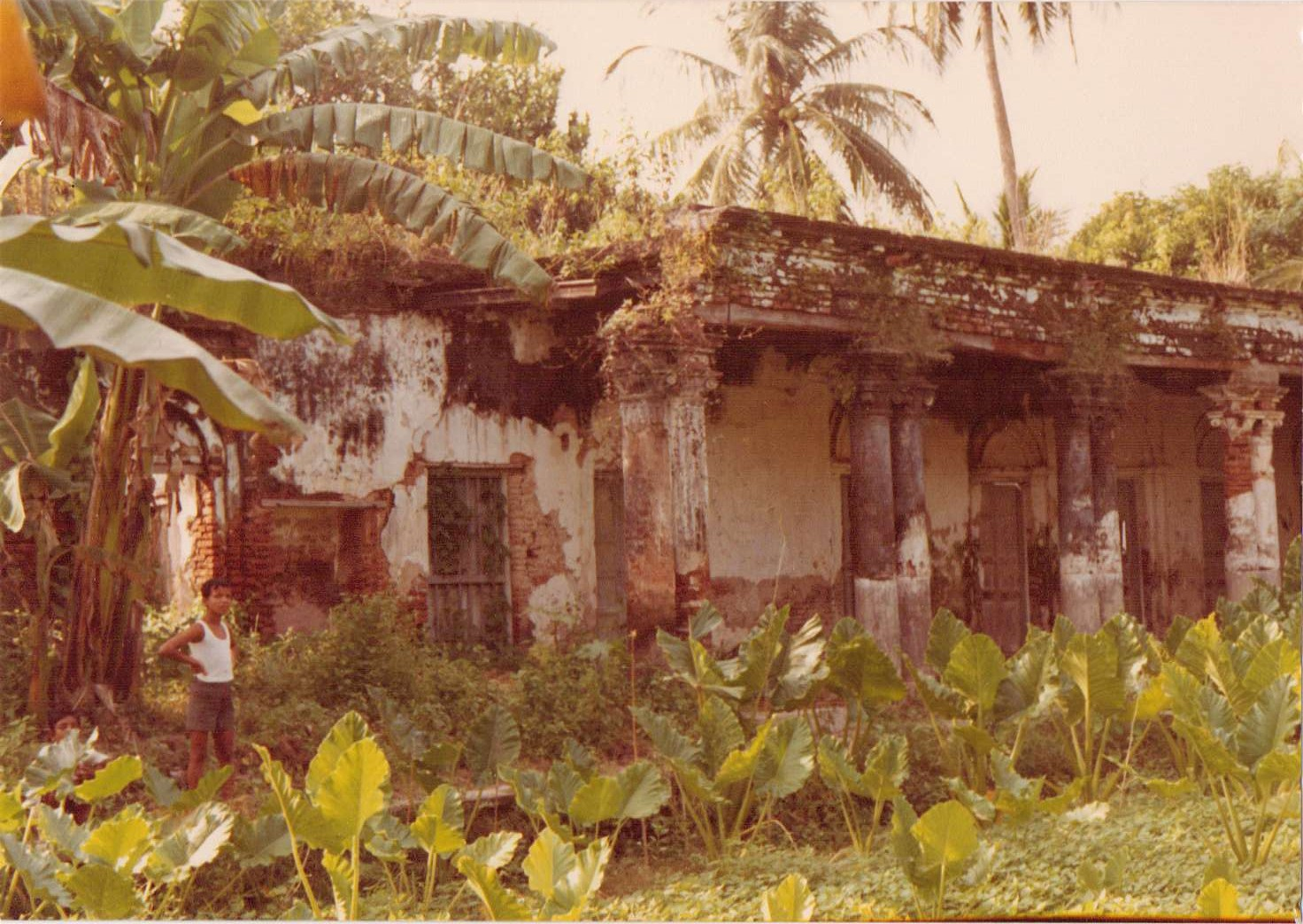
The decaying remains of the Salam Manzil, as seen in 1982.

It is unusual to find the use of the twin-pillar system in a remote village of Bengal in the mid-19th century. The twin-pillar system was necessary to support the roof, which had several layers of reinforcement. The distance of the roof from the ground appeared to be at least 3.2 metres (10.5 ft).

At present, the "Shingho Doroja" has been renovated in a different style, though the rest of the Salam Manzil is in complete ruins.

== Salamatullah Khan dynasty ==
Khan Bahadur Salamatullah Khan was preceded by his father Maulvi Qazi Sana'atullah, who was the son of Qazi Amanatullah. The latter's father was Qazi-ul-Quzat (Chief Justice) Baqaullah Khan (circa mid to late 18th century AD) – a Mughal sanad (title) holder. Khan Bahadur Salamatullah Khan was succeeded by his son Maulvi Qazi Hamidullah Khan. Hamidullah Khan married Azizunnessa Khatun, the Bengali poet. The latter's son Maulvi Qazi Mohammad Minnatullah Khan was a famous personality of the Qazi family of Tetulia.

Minnatullah Khan had two sons, namely Khan Sahib Qazi Rizwanullah Khan and Qazi Mohammad Shafiullah Khan. By the time these two sons had started their families the wealth of the family was already in sharp decline. The graves of both Qazi Mohammad Shafiullah Khan and Khan Sahib Qazi Rizwanullah Khan lie in the cemetery which is within the compound of the Tetulia Jami Mosque.

Qazi Shafiullah Khan married Shaiqatunnisa, who was the second daughter of Khan Bahadur Abu Nasr Muhammad Ali – a Presidency Municipal Magistrate and a Tribunal Sessions Judge in Kolkata of British India. Prior to receiving the Khan Bahadur title, he was awarded the title of Khan Sahib in 1914. The Khan Bahadur came from a very distinguished Muslim Bengali family of India, whose ancestry can be traced back to Qamaruddin Hosain Khan of Ajmer in the government of the Mughal emperor Shah Jahan. The Khan Bahadur's father was Shams-ul-Ulama Maulvi Abul Khair Muhammad Siddiq, to whom the Shams-ul-Ulama title was conferred by the British Empire in 1897 for "eminence in oriental learning". Abul Khair Muhammad Siddiq also became Professor of Arabic in Kolkata's Presidency College. One of Khan Bahadur Abu Nasr Muhammad Ali's brothers (Abul Muhamed Mohammad Asad) was, too, awarded the Khan Bahadur title by the British Empire and he also became the first Muslim Director of Public Instruction (DPI) in undivided Bengal. His name appears as a representative of Bengal in a symposium held in Mumbai, India, in 1947.

The eldest son of Shafiullah Khan (of the zamindar family of Tetulia) was named "Siddique" and the sons of Rizwanullah Khan (of the zamindar family of Tetulia) were named "Quadir" by Khan Bahadur Abu Nasr Mohammed Ali, the father-in-law of Shafiullah Khan. The youngest son of Shafiullah Khan, however, retained the Khan surname. The eldest son of Shafiullah Khan, namely Abu Saleh Mohammed Siddique, married the daughter of British-Empire title holder Khan Sahib Maqsud Ahmed. The late Abu Saleh Mohammed Siddique retired from the UK Civil Service, died in 2007 and is buried in the Muslim section of the Greenford cemetery in the London Borough of Ealing.

Shafiullah Khan's daughter was married to Syed Mohammad Ali, who was the son of Khan Bahadur Syed Sultan Ali of Bagerhat.

Initial studies also reveal such names as Qazi-ul-Quzat Saiyid Ahmad Ali Khan, Qazi Saadathullah, Naib Qazi Ifazatullah, Mir Jumlah Ubaid Khan Bahadur Turkhan, Qazi Kalimullah, Qazi-ul-Quzat Ghulam Yaha Khan, Muhammad Nasratullah, Qazi Izzatullah, Najibullah Khan and Muhammad Asadullah, who, apparently, along with Baqaullah Khan, were entrusted to rule as governors in the various areas of the province of Jessore (Satkhira was in the province of Jessore at the time), possibly areas of West Bengal and Orissa in the 18th century.

== See also ==
- Syed Jalaluddin Hashmey, son of the former imam of Tetulia Jami Mosque
- List of mosques in Bangladesh
- List of archaeological sites in Bangladesh
