= Satkhira City College =

College in Satkhira, Bangladesh

Coordinates: 22.7314°N 89.0612°E

- সাতক্ষীরা সিটি কলেজ
- Type: National university
- Established: 1980
- Location: Satkhira, Bangladesh
- Campus: Rasulpur, Satkhira Sadar, Satkhira - 9400
- Affiliations: University Grants Commission Bangladesh
- Website: satkhiracitycollege.jessoreboard.gov.bd

Satkhira City College (Bengali: সাতক্ষীরা সিটি কলেজ) is a college in the Rasulpur neighborhood of Satkhira, Bangladesh. Affiliated with National University, the college offers bachelor's degrees and master's degrees. It also has Higher Secondary School Certificate (HSC) program. It was established in 1980. Currently Abu Ahmed is the principal and Md. Shahidul Islam is the vice principal of the college.

== Educational activities ==
- HSC
- Degree(Pass)
- Honours
- Master's Preliminary
- Master's Final
- Masters 1 part

== Available courses ==
=== Degree (pass) ===
- Bachelor of Arts (B.A)
- Bachelor of Science (B.S.c)
- Bachelor of Social Science (B.S.S)
- Bachelor of Business Studies (B.B.S)

=== Honours ===
- Bangladeshi
- Historya
- Islamic History & Culture
- Philosophy
- Islamic Studies
- Political Science
- Sociology
- Social Welfare
- Economics
- Marketing
- Accounting
- Management
- Geography & Environment
- Finance

=== Masters ===
- Sociology
- Accounting
