= Kholpetua River =

River in Bangladesh

Coordinates: 22°13′N 89°18′E

The Kholpetua River (Kholpatua River), located in southwestern Bangladesh, is one of the large rivers of the Ganges-Padma system. It is a major river of Assasuni and Shyamnagar upazilas of Satkhira District in Khulna Division.
