= Debhata Upazila =

Debhata দেবহাটা
- Upazila
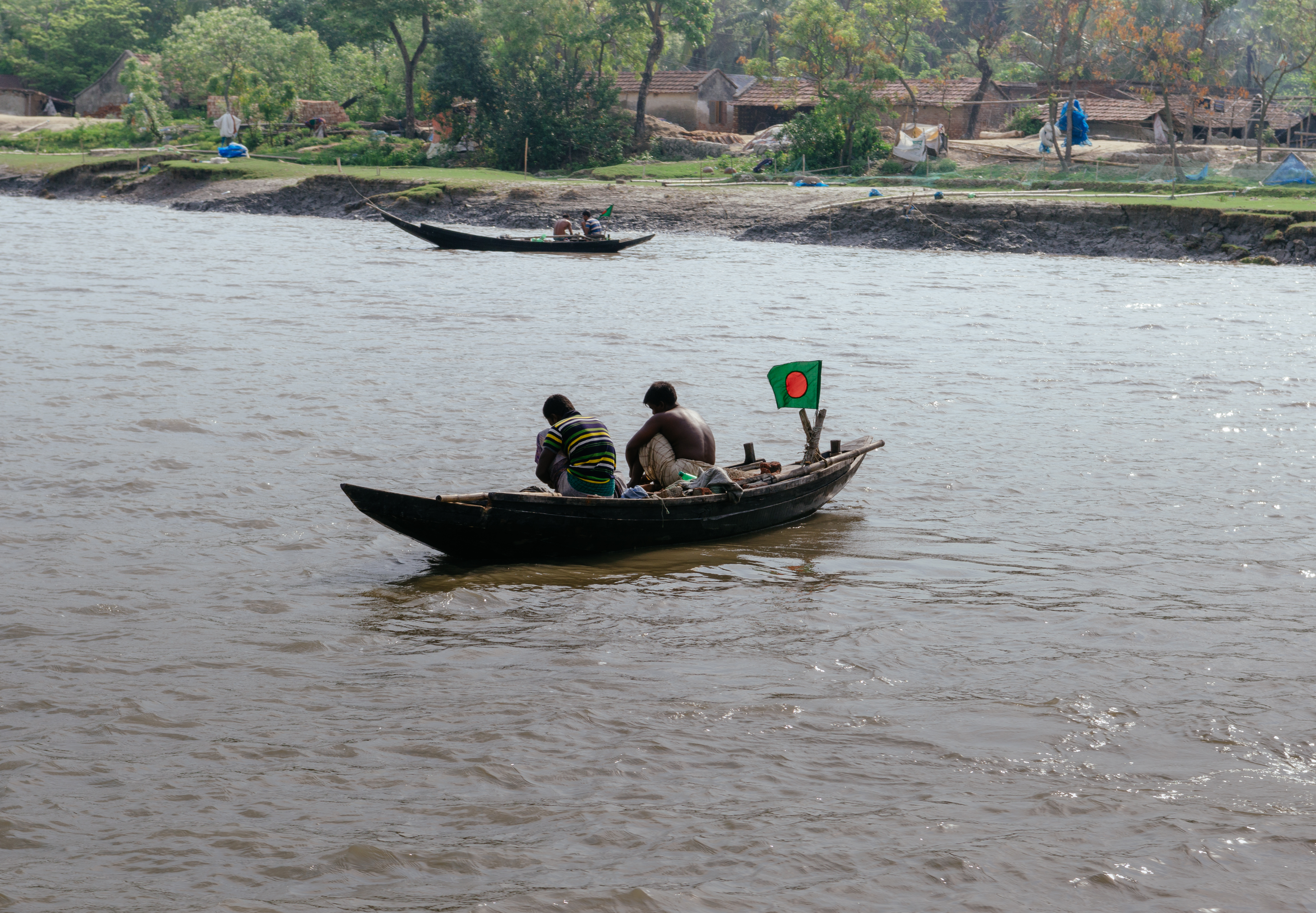
- Ichamati river at Debhata upazila

- Coordinates: 22°34′N 88°58′E
- Country: Bangladesh
- Division: Khulna
- District: Satkhira

Area
  - Total: 173.21 km^{2} (66.88 sq mi)

Population (2022)
  - Total: 133,014
  - Density: 767.93/km^{2} (1,988.9/sq mi)
- Time zone: UTC+6 (BST)
- Postal code: 9430
- Website: Official Map of Debhata

Debhata Upazila mauza geocode map

Debhata (Bengali: দেবহাটা) is an upazila of Satkhira District in Khulna Division, Bangladesh.

== Geography ==
Debhata is located at 22.5667°N 88.9667°E. It has 29813 households and total area 173.21 km^{2}.

Debhata Upazila is bounded by Satkhira Sadar Upazila on the north, Assasuni Upazila and Satkhira Sadar Upazila on the east, Kaliganj Upazila on the south and Hasnabad and Basirhat I CD Blocks in North 24 Parganas district in West Bengal, India on the west.

== Demographics ==
Religions in Debhata Upazila (2022)
Religion	Percent
Islam	83.67%
Hinduism	16.32%
Other or not stated	0.01%

According to the 2022 Bangladeshi census, Debhata Upazila had 34,254 households and a population of 133,014. 8.19% were under 5 years of age. Debhata had a literacy rate of 78.71%: 82.01% for males and 75.48% for females, and a sex ratio of 98.58 males per 100 females. 42,126 (31.67%) lived in urban areas.

As of the 2011 Census of Bangladesh, Debhata upazila had 29,813 households and a population of 125,358. 23,882 (16.52%) inhabitants were under 10 years of age. Debhata had an average literacy rate of 54.82%, compared to the national average of 51.8%, and a sex ratio of 1008 females per 1000 males. 2,781 (2.22%) of the population lived in urban areas.

According to the 1991 Bangladesh census, Debhata had a population of 99,068. Males constituted 51.11% of the population, and females 48.89%. The population aged 18 or over was 50,418. Debhata has an average literacy rate of 30.9% (7+ years), compared to the national average of 32.4%.

== Administration ==
Debhata Upazila is divided into five union parishads: Debhata, Kulia, Noapara, Parulia, and Sakhipur. The union parishads are subdivided into 59 mauzas and 125 villages.

== Notable people ==
=== Hazrat Syed Abdus Sobhan (R.) ===
Hazrat Syed Abdus Sobhan (R.) was born in 1249 Bengali Era in Kazi Mahalla village of Debhata. He was a renowned Islamic scholar and spiritual figure, popularly known as a Qutb. He devoted his life to the service of Islam. He died in 1334 Bengali Era. His shrine is located in Kazi Mahalla village.

=== Matlub Ahmad Khan Chowdhury ===
Matlub Ahmad Khan Chowdhury was born in 1872 in Kuliya village of Debhata Upazila. He passed the Entrance Examination from Rajshahi Collegiate School and obtained an M.A. degree in Mathematics from Presidency College, Calcutta. He joined the British Indian Education Department and eventually became a Divisional Inspector of Schools. After retirement, he served as an Education Adviser in the princely state of Indore under the Holkar Maharaja. He died in 1930.

=== Khan Niamuddin Sardar ===
Khan Niamuddin Sardar was a prominent social worker. He was born in the mid-nineteenth century in Baliadanga village, present-day Debhata Upazila. In 1972, he established Bahera A.T. Secondary School and, in 1329 Bengali Era, founded the "Suratjan-Kashem Ali Charitable Dispensary". In recognition of his contributions to social development, he was awarded the title of "Khan" by the British Government.

=== Fanibhushan Mandal ===
Fanibhushan Mandal was born in Debhata. He was a local landholder (Gatidar) and was involved in various social welfare activities in the area. His notable contributions included establishing schools and donating land for playgrounds and gardens. He died on 9 November 1941.

=== Shariatullah Ghazi ===
Shariatullah Ghazi was born in 1898 in Kalutala village, under Hasnabad Police Station in the Basirhat subdivision of the Twenty-Four Parganas district of India. He graduated from Presidency College, Calcutta, and subsequently began his career as a teacher. In 1952, he moved with his family to Parulia village in Debhata Police Station and became associated with several educational institutions. He was a distinguished educationist and social worker. He died in Parulia on 19 Baishakh 1367 Bengali Era (1960).

=== Bidhan Chandra Roy ===
Dr. Bidhan Chandra Roy was born in Patna, Bihar, in 1882. His ancestral home was in Townshreepur village of Debhata Upazila. He was a descendant of Raja Pratapaditya, one of the twelve Bhuiyans of Bengal. His father's name was Prakash Chandra Roy. He obtained the Fellowship of the Royal College of Surgeons (FRCS) in London and became a renowned physician. He was also known as an orator and politician. Following India's independence in 1947, he served as the Chief Minister of West Bengal until his death in 1962.

=== Captain Shahjahan Master ===
Captain Shahjahan Master was born on 6 February 1937 in Townshreepur village of Debhata Upazila, Satkhira District. His father's name was Munshi Khizir Mistry. He graduated with a Bachelor of Commerce (B.Com.) degree from Kushtia College in 1958. He subsequently served as the headmaster of several educational institutions throughout his career.

In 1965, he joined the Pakistan Mujahid Force and attained the rank of Captain. During the Bangladesh Liberation War in 1971, he played a role in organizing the 9th Sector and served as its sector commander. In 1985, he assumed office as the Chairman of Debhata Upazila. While serving as the headmaster of Sakhhipur High School, he died of cardiac arrest on 23 July 1993 at 12:30 pm.

=== Anil Swarnakar ===
Anil Swarnakar was a prominent landowner from Debishahar village in Debhata Upazila. He owned approximately 6,000 to 7,000 bighas of land. In 1955, he established the Agriculture and Fish Farming Co-operative Limited in Debishahar. In 1970, he contested the Provincial Assembly election under the Pakistan Democratic Party. He was killed by assassins in 1972.

=== A. F. M. Entaz Ali ===
A. F. M. Entaz Ali was born in India on 20 January 1937. He was actively involved in politics from his student life. After obtaining a postgraduate degree from the University of Dhaka, he began his professional career as a lawyer. During the Bangladesh Liberation War in 1971, he demonstrated his commitment and abilities as an organizer and freedom fighter. In 1973, he was elected as a Member of Parliament from the Debhata–Kaliganj constituency in the first parliamentary election of Bangladesh. He died on 26 January 1998.

=== Md. Asaduzzaman Asad ===
Md. Asaduzzaman Asad is a Bangladeshi entrepreneur and healthcare service organizer. He is the founder and proprietor of Care Diagnostic Center & Clinic, located in Palashpole, Satkhira. He established the institution on 5 May 2011. Under his initiative, the institution began providing medical care and various diagnostic services to the local community.

== See also ==
- Upazilas of Bangladesh
- Districts of Bangladesh
- Divisions of Bangladesh
