= Kaliganj Upazila, Satkhira =

Kaliganj কালীগঞ্জ
- Upazila
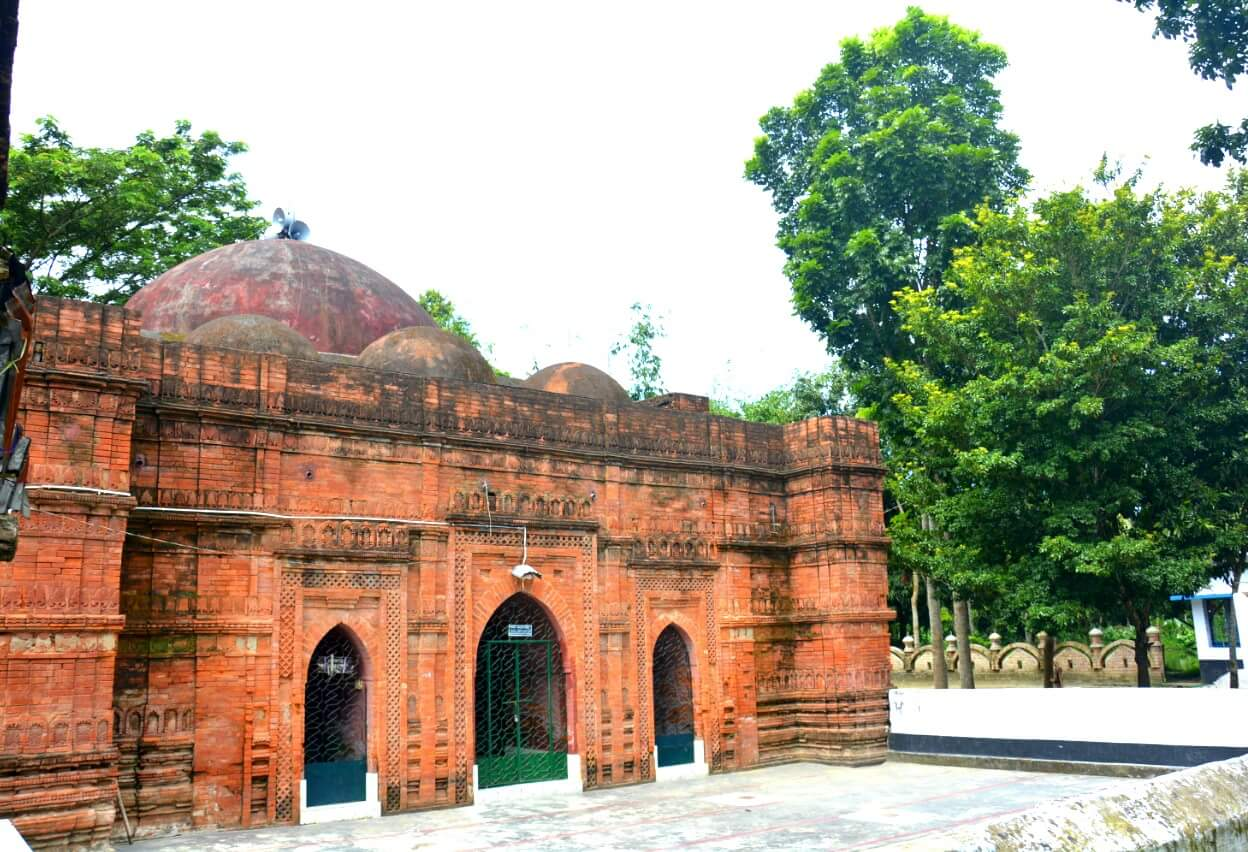
- Prabajpur Shahi Mosque

- Coordinates: 22°27′N 89°2.5′E
- Country: Bangladesh
- Division: Khulna
- District: Satkhira

Government
  - Chairman: Sayeed Mehedi

Area
  - Total: 333.78 km^{2} (128.87 sq mi)

Population (2022)
  - Total: 305,495
  - Density: 915.26/km^{2} (2,370.5/sq mi)
- Time zone: UTC+6 (BST)
- Postal code: 9450
- Website: kaliganj.satkhira.gov.bd

Kaliganj (Bengali: কালীগঞ্জ) is an upazila of Satkhira District in the Division of Khulna, Bangladesh.

== Geography ==
Kaliganj is located at 22.4500°N 89.0417°E. It has 41,162 households and total area 333.78 km^{2}.

Kaliganj Upazila is bounded by Debhata Upazila and Assasuni Upazila on the north, Assasuni Upazila on the east, Shyamnagar Upazila on the south and Hingalganj community development block in North 24 Parganas district in West Bengal, India on the west.

== Demographics ==
Religions in Kaliganj Upazila (2022)
Religion	Percent
Islam	86.11%
Hinduism	13.82%
Other or not stated	0.07%

According to the 2022 Bangladeshi census, Kaliganj Upazila had 78,675 households and a population of 305,495. 8.49% were under 5 years of age. Kaliganj had a literacy rate of 75.72%: 78.69% for males and 72.77% for females, and a sex ratio of 99.92. 48,167 (15.77%) lived in urban areas.

As of the 2011 Census of Bangladesh, Kaliganj upazila had 64,909 households and a population of 274,889. 53,979 (19.64%) were under 10 years of age. Kaliganj had an average literacy rate of 51.78%, compared to the national average of 51.8%, and a sex ratio of 1010 females per 1000 males. 16,863 (6.13%) of the population lived in urban areas.

According to the 1991 Bangladesh census, Kaliganj had a population of 225,596. Males constituted 50.7% of the population, and females 49.3%. The population aged 18 or over was 115,458. Kaliganj had an average literacy rate of 32.3% (7+ years), compared to the national average of 32.4%.

== History ==
During the Bangladesh Liberation War in 1971 Kaliganj was under Sector 9. A number of encounters between the freedom fighters and the Pak army were held in the upazila most noted of which were at Basantapur, Khanzia, Pirojpur, Nazimganj, Dudli and Ukshar. Kaliganj was liberated on 20 November 1971.

== Administration ==
Kaliganj Upazila is divided into 12 union parishads: Bhara Simla, Bishnupur, Champaphul, Dakshin Sreepur, Dhalbaria, Krishnanagr, Kushlia, Mathureshpur, Mautala, Nalta, Ratanpur, and Tarali. The union parishads are subdivided into 243 mauzas and 254 villages.

Chairman: Mr. Sayeed Mehedi (From Awami League)

Upazila Nirbahi Officer (UNO): Golam Moinuddin Hasan

== Transport ==
The Kakshiyali River (actually a canal) bisects the upazila roughly east to west, connecting the Galghasia and Kalindi Rivers.

== Media ==
- Gram Bangla (1987)
- Kakshiali (1992)
- Surya Tarun
- Kaliganj Barta
- Nadi (1993)
- Mukti Surya (1995)
- Arjita Kantha (1998)
- Mukto Alap (2002)
- Raktim Surya (2004)
- ' Al-Ahsan (2005)
- Smriti (2005)
- Bragratat (2005).

== Education ==
- Kaliganj Govt. College
- Rokeya Monsur Degree Mohila College
- Nalta Ahsania Mission Residential College
- D.r.m United Ideal College, Ratanpur
- Kaliganj Government Secondary School
- Nalta Secondary School
- Dr. Mujib Rubi High School
- D.K.M.L. School & College, Located at Kushulia, Hat Kh
- Dhuliapur Adarsha Madhomik Biddaloy, Located at near Secendernagor Choumohoni Bazar
- Kazi Alauddin Degree College
- Mojahar Memorial Secondary School

== Notable residents ==
- Khan Bahadur Ahsanullah
- AFM Ruhal Haque
- Mustafizur Rahman
- Amin Khan (actor)
- Sabina Yasmin
- Nilufar Yasmin
- Falguni Hamid
- Rani Sarker
- Shampa Goswami, teacher and activist.

== See also ==
- Upazilas of Bangladesh
- Districts of Bangladesh
- Divisions of Bangladesh
- Satkhira District
