= Satkhira Sadar Upazila =

Satkhira Sadar সাতক্ষীরা সদর
- Upazila
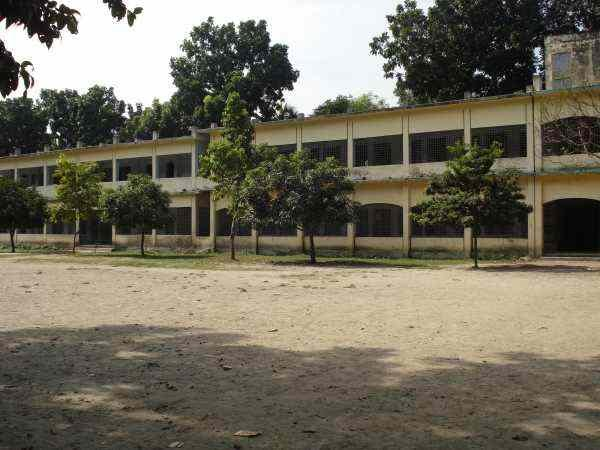
- Satkhira Government High School, Satkhira Sadar

- Coordinates: 22°52.5′N 89°2.5′E
- Country: Bangladesh
- Division: Khulna
- District: Satkhira

Area
  - Total: 398.57 km^{2} (153.89 sq mi)

Population (2022)
  - Total: 522,964
  - Density: 1,312.1/km^{2} (3,398.3/sq mi)
- Time zone: UTC+6 (BST)
- Postal code: 9400
- Area code: 0471
- Website: satkhirasadar.satkhira.gov.bd

Satkhira Sadar (Bengali: সাতক্ষীরা সদর) is an upazila (subdistrict) of Satkhira District in Khulna Division, Bangladesh.

Satkhira Sadar Upazila mauza geocode map

== Geography ==
Satkhira Sadar is located at 22.7167°N 89.0750°E. It has 109,105 households and a total area 400.82 km^{2}.

Satkhira Sadar Upazila is bounded by Kalaroa Upazila on the north, Tala Upazila on the east, Debhata and Assasuni upazilas on the south and Basirhat I and Baduria CD Blocks in North 24 Parganas district in West Bengal, India, on the west.

== Demographics ==
Religions in Satkhira Sadar Upazila (2022)
Religion	Percent
Islam	88.81%
Hinduism	11.00%
Other or not stated	0.19%

According to the 2022 Bangladeshi census, Satkhira Sadar Upazila had 135,412 households and a population of 522,964. 8.61% were under 5 years of age. Satkhira Sadar had a literacy rate of 78.06%: 80.72% for males and 75.40% for females, with a sex ratio of 100.30 males per 100 females. 163,454 (31.25%) lived in urban areas.

As of the 2011 Census of Bangladesh, Satkhira Sadar upazila had 109,105 households and a population of 460,892. 85,999 inhabitants (18.66%) were under 10 years of age. Satkhira Sadar had an average literacy rate of 56.51%, compared to the national average of 51.8%, and a sex ratio of 998 females per 1,000 males. 113,322 inhabitants, or 24.59% of the population, lived in urban areas.

At the 1991 census, Satkhira Sadar had a population of 344,444. Males constituted 51.3% of the population, and females 48.7%. This Upazila's eighteen up population was 176,670. The average literacy rate was 34.6% (7+ years), compared to the national average of 32.4% literate.

== Administration ==
Satkhira Sadar Upazila is divided into Satkhira Municipality and 14 union parishads: Agardari, Alipur, Baikari, Balli, Banshdaha, Bhomra, Brahmarajpur, Dhulihar, Fingri, Ghona, Jhaudanga, Kuskhali, Labsa, and Shibpur. The union parishads are subdivided into 119 mauzas and 237 villages.

Satkhira Municipality is subdivided into 9 wards and 33 mahallas.

== Colleges ==
Local colleges include:

- Satkhira City College
- Satkhira Day-Night College
- Satkhira Government College
- Satkhira Government Mohila College
- Satkhira Medical College
- Satkhira Polytechnic Institute

== Notable residents ==
- Mir Mostaque Ahmed Robi, Member of Parliament, was elected from constituency Satkhira-2 in the 2014 general election.

== See also ==
- Upazilas of Bangladesh
- Districts of Bangladesh
- Divisions of Bangladesh
