= Assasuni Upazila =

Assasuni আশাশুনি
- Upazila
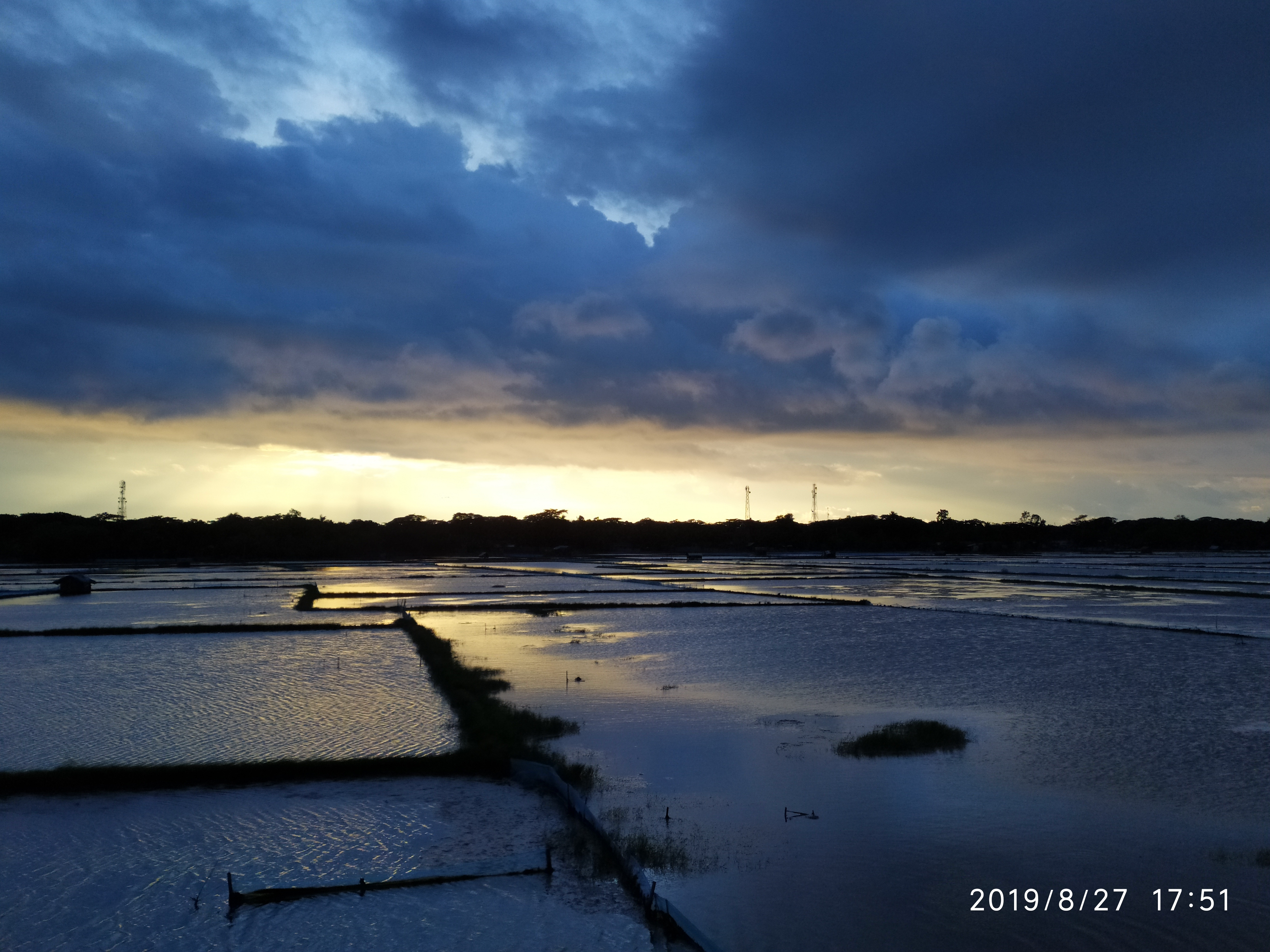
- Sunset over the flooded fields of Assasuni upazila

- Coordinates: 22°33′N 89°10.086′E
- Country: Bangladesh
- Division: Khulna
- District: Satkhira

Area
  - Total: 374.81 km^{2} (144.71 sq mi)

Population (2022)
  - Total: 281,758
  - Density: 751.74/km^{2} (1,947.0/sq mi)
- Time zone: UTC+6 (BST)
- Postal code: 9460
- Website: assasuni.satkhira.gov.bd

Assasuni Upazila mauza geocode map

Assasuni (Bengali: আশাশুনি, Aashashooni, Ashashuni, means hearing the hope ) is an upazila of Satkhira District in Khulna Division, Bangladesh.

== Geography ==
Assasuni is located at 22.5500°N 89.1681°E. It has a total area of 374.81 km^{2}.

The Marichchap, Kholpetua, Betna and Kopothakkho are rivers of Assasuni.

== Demographics ==
Religions in Assassuni Upazila (2022)
Religion	Percent
Islam	76.29%
Hinduism	23.36%
Other or not stated	0.35%

According to the 2022 Bangladeshi census, Ashashuni Upazila had 71,857 households and a population of 281,758. 8.35% were under 5 years of age. Ashashuni had a literacy rate of 72.46%: 76.84% for males and 68.12% for females, with a sex ratio of 99.56 males per 100 females. 34,127 (12.11%) lived in urban areas.

As of the 2011 Census of Bangladesh, Assasuni upazila had 62,037 households and a population of 268,754. 55,287 (20.57%) were under 10 years of age. Assasuni had an average literacy rate of 49.83%, compared to the national average of 51.8%, and a sex ratio of 1006 females per 1000 males. 8,585 (3.19%) of the population lived in urban areas.

In the 1991 Bangladesh census, Assasuni had a population of 220,957. Males constituted 50.07% of the population, and females 49.93%. The population above the age of 18 was 110,961, with a literacy rate of 30.3% (7+ years), below the national average of 32.4%.

== Administration ==
Assasuni Upazila is divided into 11 union parishads: Anulia, Assasuni, Baradal, Budhhata, Durgapur, Kadakati, Khajra, Kulla, Pratapnagar, Sobhnali, and Sreeula. The union parishads are subdivided into 143 mauzas and 241 villages.

== Assasuni Upazila Health Complex ==
Assasuni Upazila Health Complex is a 50-bed government hospital. It is an important healthcare center in Satkhira district, providing affordable and quality healthcare to the people of surrounding unions and rural areas. An average of hundreds of patients come here for treatment every day. The outpost is open from 8 a.m. to 2 p.m., and the emergency department is open 24/7. Teams of trained doctors and nurses work to deal with any accident or emergency.

== Education ==
- Assasuni Mohila College
- Champaful Acharcha Profullo Chandra High School
- Kalima Khali Azizia Siddikia senior Fazil Madrasha
- Kalima Khali Govt. Primary School
- Sriula High School
- Tuardanga H,F High school
- Harivanga High School
- Harivanga Govt.Primary School
- 68 No. Sriula Govt. Primary School
- Assasuni Government High School
- Dargahpur S.K.R.H. Higher Secondary School
- Assasuni Govt College
- Budhhata B,B,M collegiate School
- GUNAKARKATI SHAH MUHAMMAD YAHYA SECONDARY SCHOOL
- Assasuni Secondary Girl's High School
- Chapra High School
- Kunduria High School
- Mariala High School
- A.P.S Degree College
- Kadakati Arar High School
- Mohiskur Govt. Primary School
- Goaldanga Fakirbari High School
- Bichhat new model high school
- Batra Ebtedai Madrasha
- Bardal Secondary Girl's High School
- Baradal Aftabuddin Collegiate School
- Goaldanga Sukkulia Dakhil Madrasa
- Baradal Dakhil Madrasa
- Fakrabad Girls School
- Puijala BMRB HIGH SCHOOL
- Kodanda Secondary School
- Fakrabad Govt Primary School
- Fakrabad Adarsha Gram School
- Fakrabad Hafezia Madrasa
- Baintala R.C High school
- Troydoshpolli High School, Baintala
- Baintala Govt. Primary school
- Godara almadani Dakhil madrasha.
- Komlapur Govt. Primary School
- Sreeula Govt. Primary School
- Sonai Govt.Primary School
- Sabdalpur Govt. Primary School
- Khariati Secondary School
- Mohisha Danga Collegiate School
1. Kakbasia bangobondhu High School

== Environmental issues ==
Assasuni is now under severe natural threat. Water logging is miserable during the rainy season. Cyclone Aila affected Assasuni badly in 2009. Crops failed tremendously. The earthen embankments and seawalls are always on the threat of erosion during every rainy seasons.
