= Tala Upazila =

Tala তালা
- Upazila
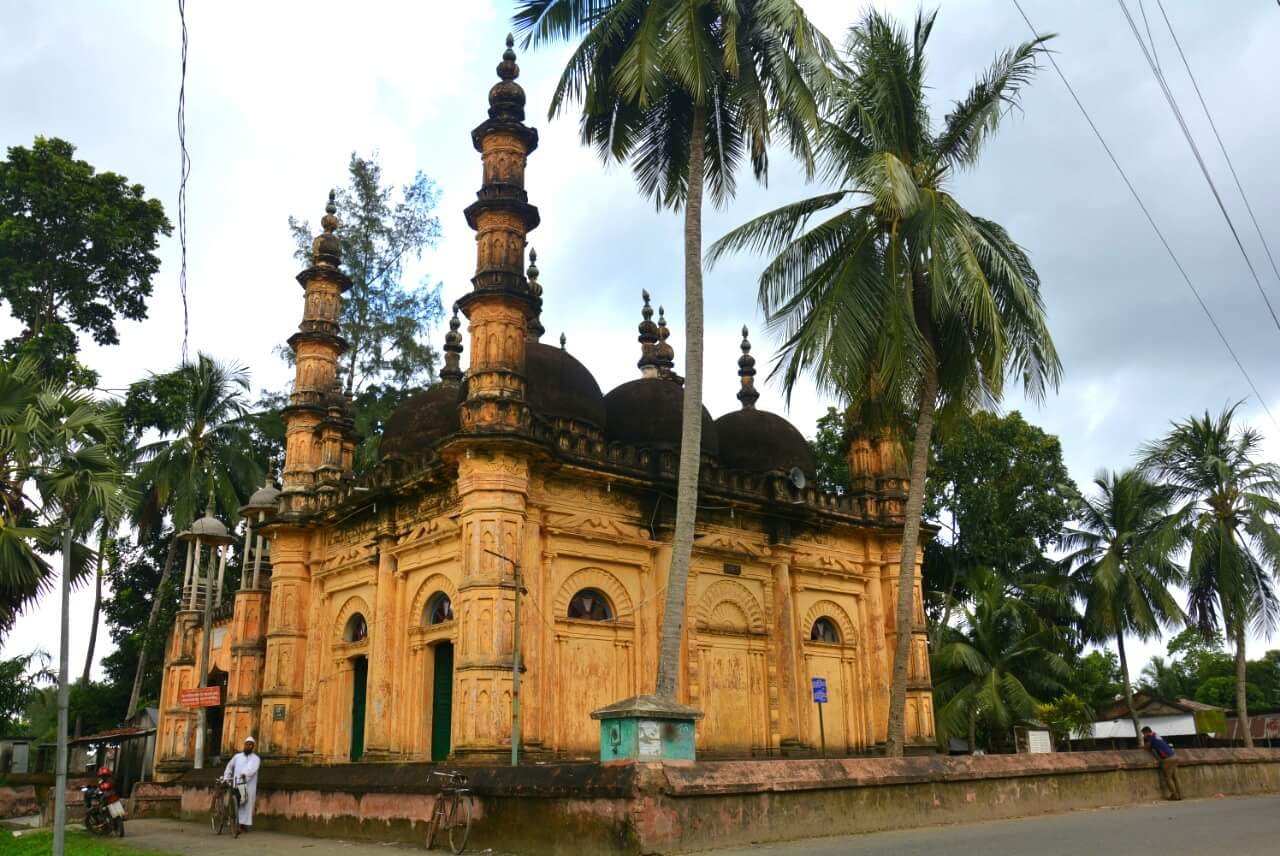
- Tetulia Jame Mosque

- Coordinates: 22°45′N 89°15′E
- Country: Bangladesh
- Division: Khulna
- District: Satkhira

Area
  - Total: 337.24 km^{2} (130.21 sq mi)

Population (2022)
  - Total: 326,111
  - Density: 967.00/km^{2} (2,504.5/sq mi)
- Time zone: UTC+6 (BST)
- Postal code: 9420
- Climate: Aw
- Website: tala.satkhira.gov.bd

Tala Upazila mauza geocode map

Tala (Bengali: তালা) is an upazila of the Satkhira District in Khulna Division of Bangladesh.

== Geography ==
Tala is located at 22.7500°N 89.2500°E and has a total area of 337.24 km^{2}.

== History ==
Tala thana was established in 1913 and made an upazila in 1983.

== Demographics ==
Religions in Tala Upazila (2022)
Religion	Percent
Islam	75.96%
Hinduism	23.36%
Christianity	0.59%
Other or not stated	0.09%

According to the 2022 Bangladeshi census, Tala Upazila had 85,534 households and a population of 326,111. 8.07% were under 5 years of age. Tala had a literacy rate of 74.28%: 78.20% for males and 70.41% for females, with a sex ratio of 99.34 males per 100 females. 24,838 (7.62%) lived in urban areas.

As of the 2011 Census of Bangladesh, Tala upazila had 72,465 households and a population of 299,820. 55,963 (18.67%) were under 10 years of age. Tala had an average literacy rate of 50.88%, compared to the national average of 51.8%, and a sex ratio of 1007 females per 1000 males. 9,528 (3.18%) of the population lived in urban areas.

As of the 1991 Bangladesh census, Tala has a population of 251,388. 51.31% of the population is male, and 48.69% is female.

== Administration ==
Tala Upazila is divided into 12 union parishads: Dhandia, Islamkati, Jalalpur, Khalilnagar, Khalishkhali, Khesra, Kumira, Magura, Nagarghata, Sarulia, Tala, and Tentulia. The union parishads are subdivided into 150 mauzas and 229 villages.

== Education ==
According to Banglapedia, Kumira Multilateral High School, founded in 1902, is a notable secondary school.

== See also ==
- Upazilas of Bangladesh
- Districts of Bangladesh
- Divisions of Bangladesh
- Administrative geography of Bangladesh
