= Satkhira District =

Satkhira District সাতক্ষীরা জেলা
- District of Bangladesh
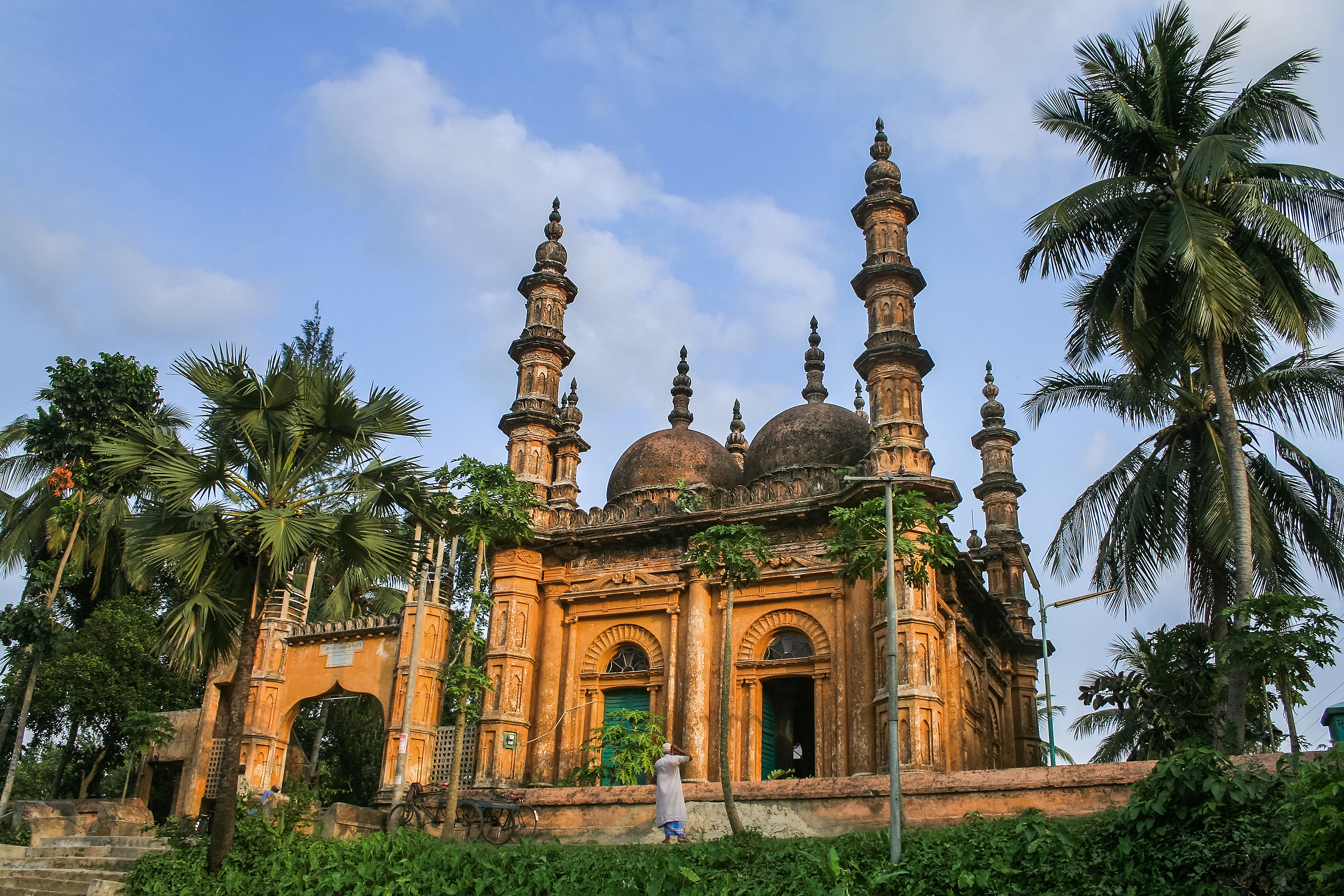
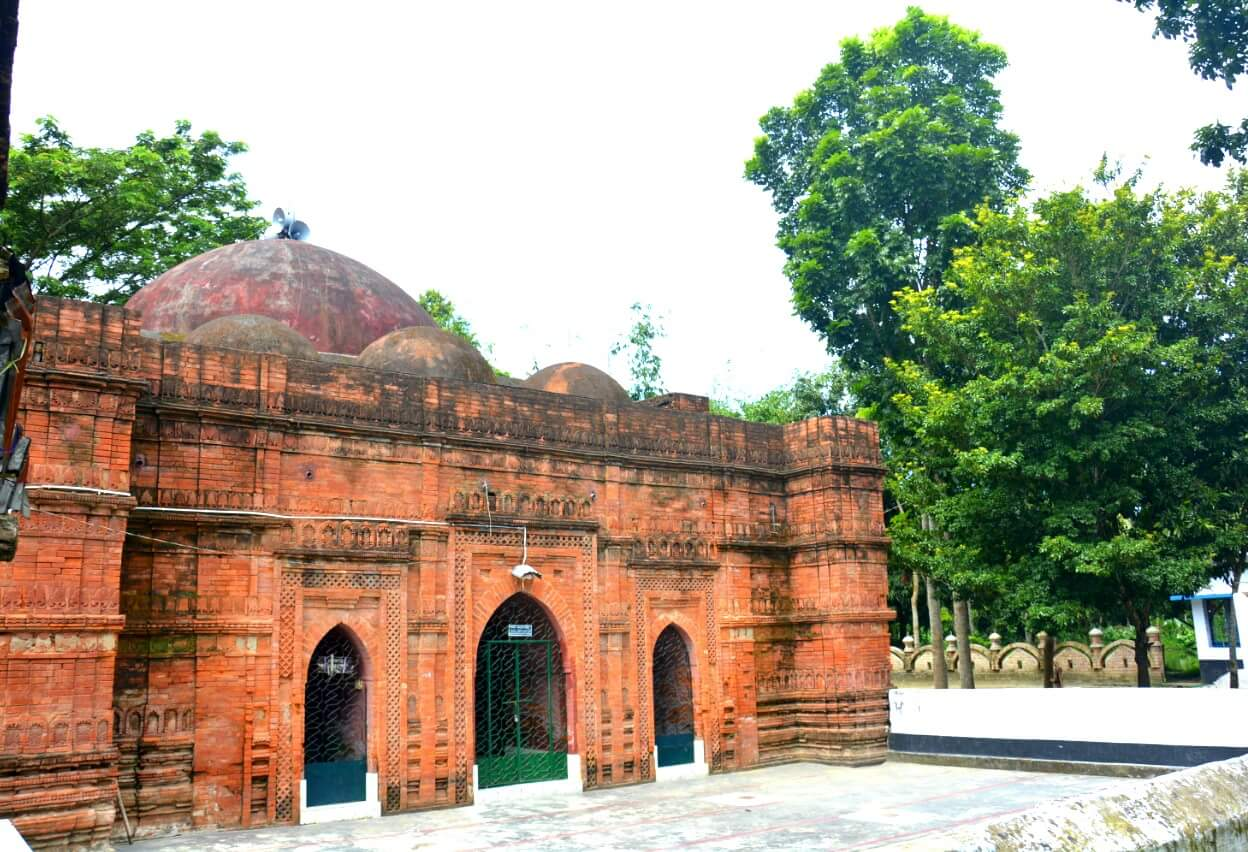
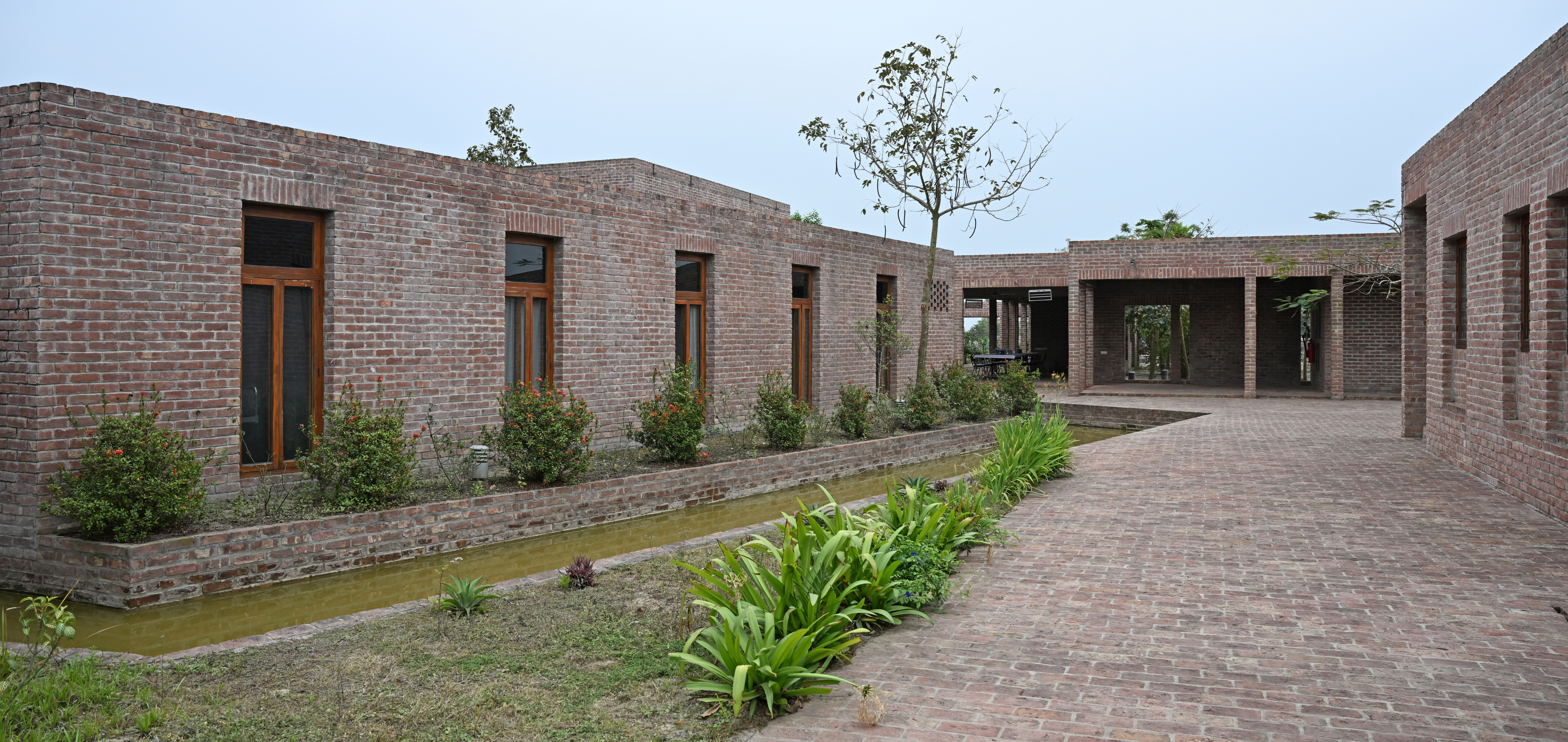
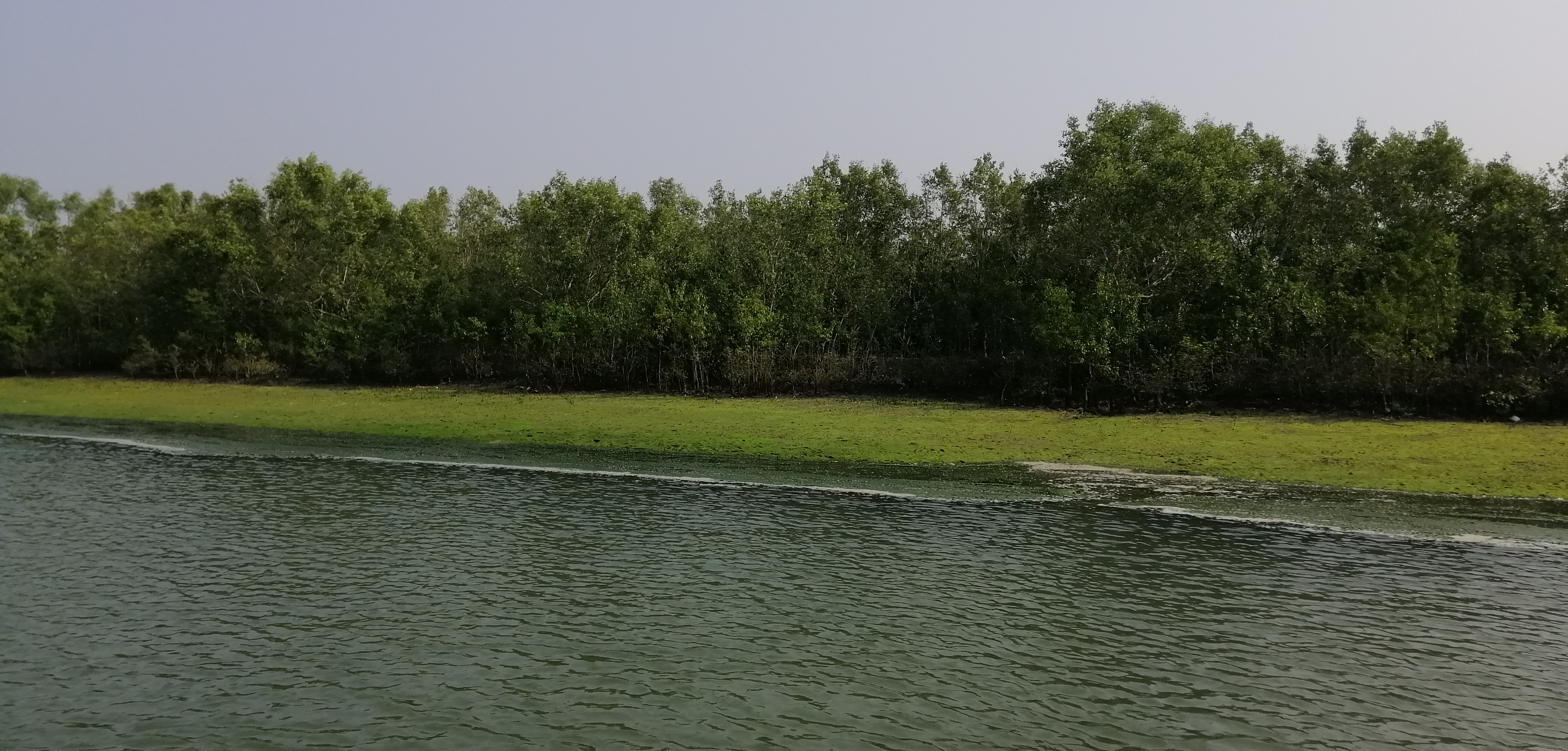
- Clockwise from top: Tetulia Jami Mosque, Shyamnagar Hospital, Probajpur Shahi Mosque, Sundarbans
- Motto: The attraction of Satkhira is the Sundarbans by road.
- Location of Satkhira District in Bangladesh
- Expandable map of Satkhira District
- Coordinates: 22.35°N 89.08°E
- Country: Bangladesh
- Division: Khulna
- Sub District Established: 1852 (174 years ago)
- Established as District: 1 March 1984 (42 years ago)
- Headquarters: Satkhira-2

Government
  - Member of Parliament: Vacant
  - Deputy Commissioner: Mustak Ahmed

Area
  - Total: 3,817.29 km^{2} (1,473.86 sq mi)

Population (2022)
  - Total: 2,196,582
  - Density: 575.430/km^{2} (1,490.36/sq mi)
- Time zone: UTC+06:00 (BST)
- Postal code: 9400
- Area code: 0471
- ISO 3166 code: BD-58
- HDI (2019): 0.649 medium · 4th of 20

Satkhira District (Bengali: সাতক্ষীরা জেলা; lit. 'Seven cucumbers') is a district in southwestern Bangladesh and is part of Khulna Division. It lies along the border with West Bengal, India. It is on the bank of the Arpangachhia River. The largest city and headquarters of this district is Satkhira.

== Geography ==
Satkhira District has an area of 3,817 square kilometres (1,474 sq mi). It is bordered to the north by Jessore District, on the south by the Bay of Bengal, to the east by Khulna District, and to the west by North 24 Parganas and South 24 Parganas districts of West Bengal, India.

The annual average maximum temperature reaches 35.5 °C (95.9 °F); minimum temperature is 12.5 °C (54.5 °F). The annual rainfall is 1710 mm (67 in).

The main rivers are the Kopotakhi river across Dorgapur union of Assasuni Upazila, Morichap River, Kholpetua River, Betna River, Raimangal River, Hariabhanga river, Ichamati River, Betrabati River and Kalindi-Jamuna River.

=== Climate ===
Tropical savanna climates have a monthly mean temperature above 18 °C (64 °F) in every month of the year and typically a pronounced dry season, with the driest month having precipitation less than 60mm (2.36 in) of precipitation. The Köppen Climate Classification subtype for this climate is "Aw" (tropical savanna climate).

Climate data for Satkhira
Month	Jan	Feb	Mar	Apr	May	Jun	Jul	Aug	Sep	Oct	Nov	Dec	Year
Mean daily maximum °C (°F)	25 (77)	28 (82)	33 (91)	34 (93)	34 (93)	33 (91)	31 (87)	31 (87)	32 (89)	31 (87)	29 (84)	26 (78)	30 (86)
Mean daily minimum °C (°F)	12 (53)	15 (59)	20 (68)	24 (75)	25 (77)	26 (78)	26 (78)	25 (77)	25 (77)	23 (73)	18 (64)	13 (55)	21 (69)
Average precipitation mm (inches)	7.6 (0.3)	23 (0.9)	30 (1.2)	71 (2.8)	140 (5.7)	290 (11.6)	350 (13.9)	330 (12.8)	270 (10.5)	140 (5.6)	25 (1)	7.6 (0.3)	1,690 (66.5)
Source: Weatherbase

== Demographics ==
Historical population
Year	Pop.	±% p.a.
1974	1,143,953	—
1981	1,354,662	+2.44%
1991	1,597,178	+1.66%
2001	1,864,704	+1.56%
2011	1,985,959	+0.63%
2022	2,196,582	+0.92%

According to the 2022 Census of Bangladesh, Satkhira District had 566,752 households and a population of 2,196,582 with an average 3.85 people per household. Among the population, 360,699 (16.42%) inhabitants were under 10 years of age. The population density was 575 people per km^{2}. Satkhira District had a literacy rate (age 7 and over) of 75.32%, compared to the national average of 74.80%, and a sex ratio of 1009 females per 1000 males. Approximately, 19.67% of the population lived in urban areas. The ethnic population was 3,865.

Religion in Satkhira District (2022)
Religion	Percent
Islam	84.29%
Hinduism	15.35%
Other or not stated	0.36%

Religion in present-day Satkhira District
Religion	1941 (Note: 1941 figures are for Satkhira subdivision of erstwhile Khulna district, excluding territory in Sundarbans Forest thana (which is less than 7000 people for the entire district))		1981		1991		2001		2011		2022	
Religion	Pop.	%	Pop.	%	Pop.	%	Pop.	%	Pop.	%	Pop.	%
Islam	364,068	52.47%	1,002,481	74.00%	1,247,051	78.08%	1,495,219	80.19%	1,625,782	81.86%	1,851,516	84.29%
Hinduism	327,458	47.20%	347,349	25.64%	342,520	21.45%	360,723	19.34%	351,551	17.70%	337,145	15.35%
Others (Note: Including Jainism, Christianity, Buddhism, Zoroastrianism, Judaism, Ad-Dharmis, or not stated)	2,310	0.33%	4,832	0.36%	7,607	0.47%	8,762	0.47%	8,626	0.44%	7,921	0.36%
Total Population	693,836	100%	1,354,662	100%	1,597,178	100%	1,864,704	100%	1,985,959	100%	2,196,582	100%

Satkhira had a 47% Hindu population in 1941 dominated by Scheduled Castes, with several thanas in the present district having a Hindu majority. During the massive riots in the 1950s and 1960s most of the Hindus there fled to neighboring India. The population of Hindus and Christians has remained constant since 1981, but their percentages have fallen massively. Christians live mainly in Kalaroa and Tala upazilas.

== Economy ==
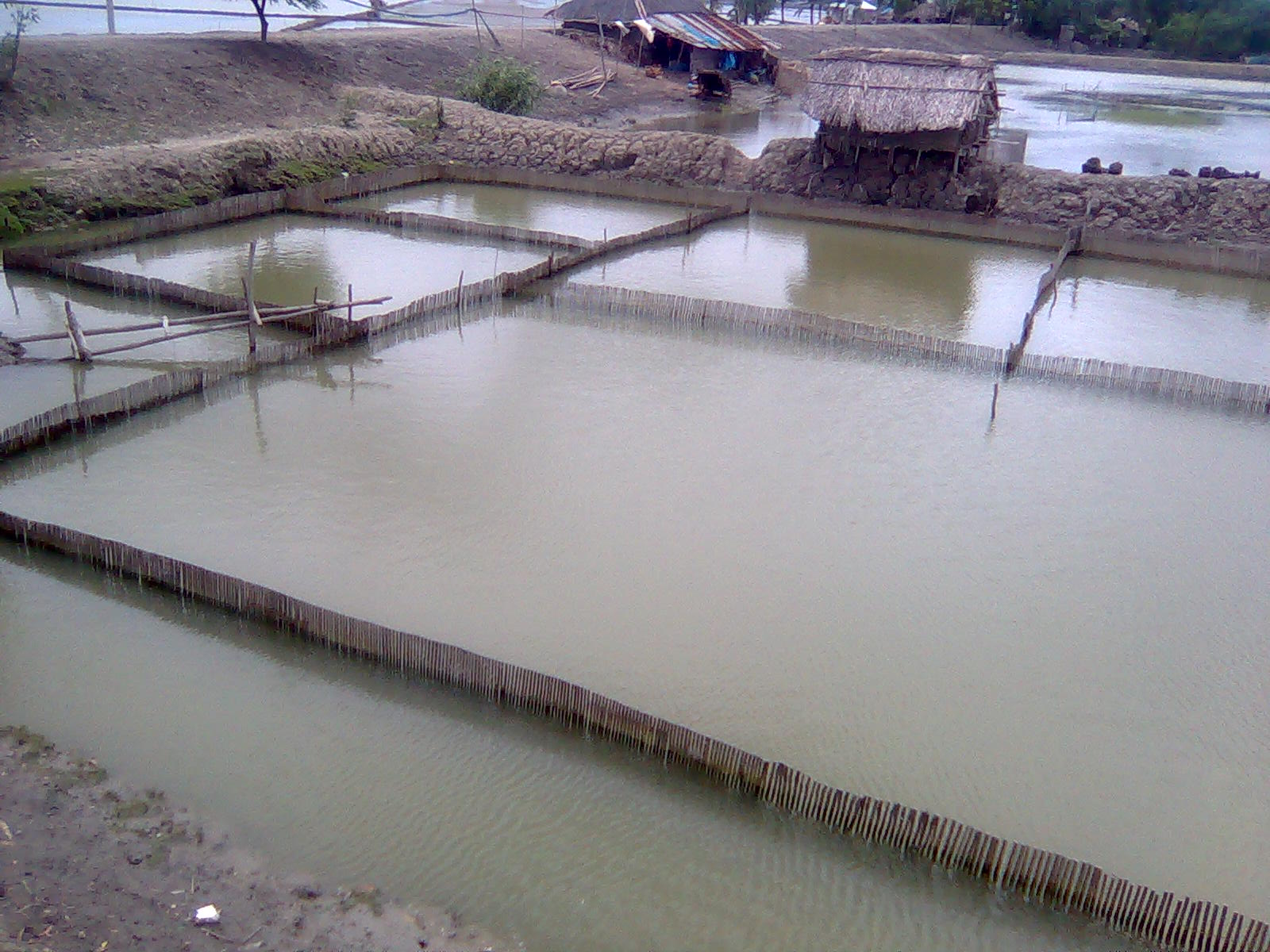
Shrimp hatchery

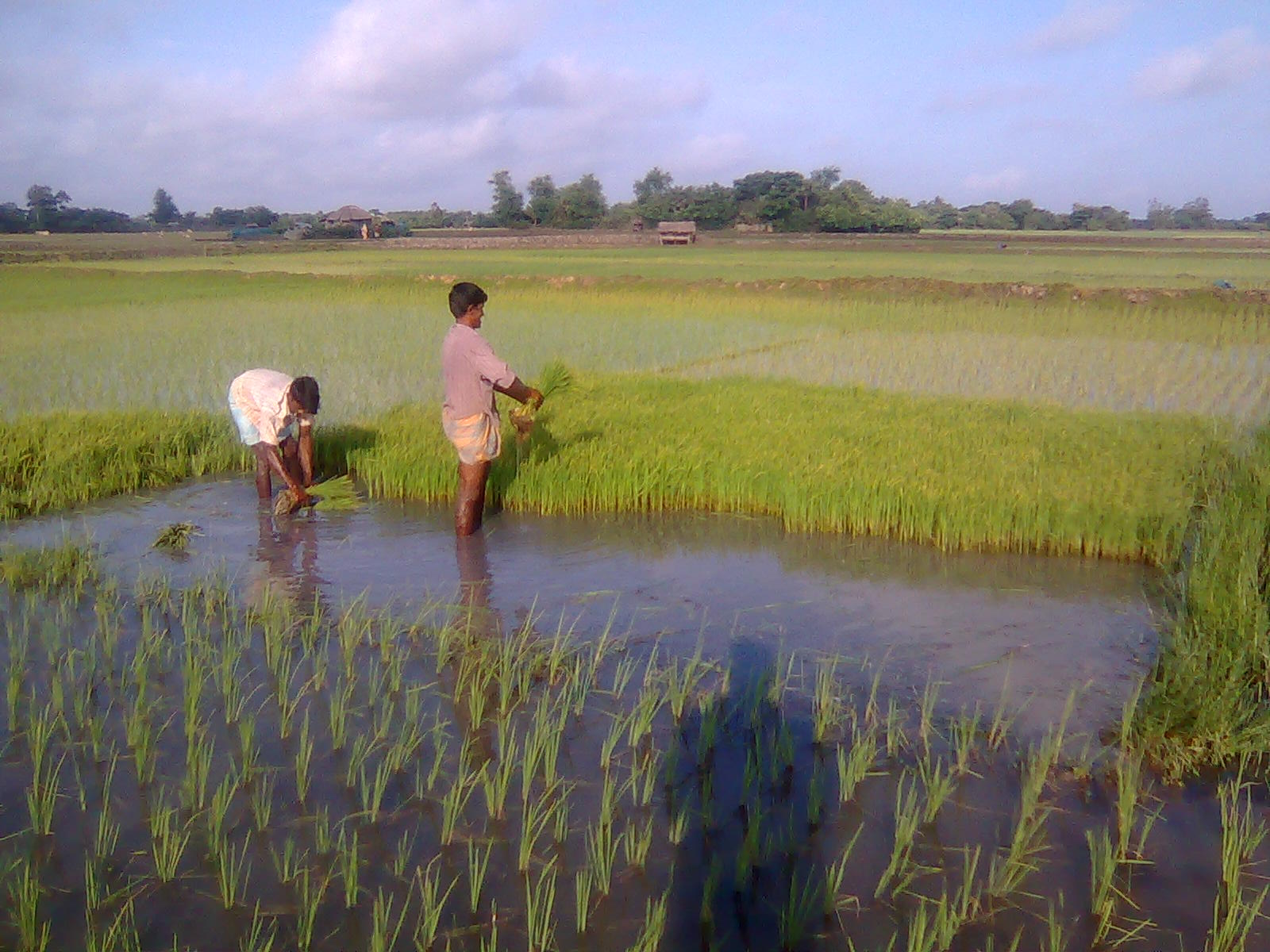
rice planting near village Bhagbah

The economy of Satkhira is mainly agriculture based. But it has diverse opportunity of economic prosperity. One land port (Bhomra) and several export products make Satkhira as the next prosperous district of Bangladesh. Most people in the southern part of Satkhira depend on pisciculture, locally called gher. Main fruits are mango, blackberry, jackfruit, banana, papaya, litchi, coconut and guava. Farms are 86 dairies, 322 poultry farms, 3,046 fisheries, 3,650 shrimp farms, 66 hatcheries and one cattle breeding centre. Export products

1. Shrimp
2. Mango
3. Jute
4. Crab
5. Handmade Clay Tiles

== Points of interest ==
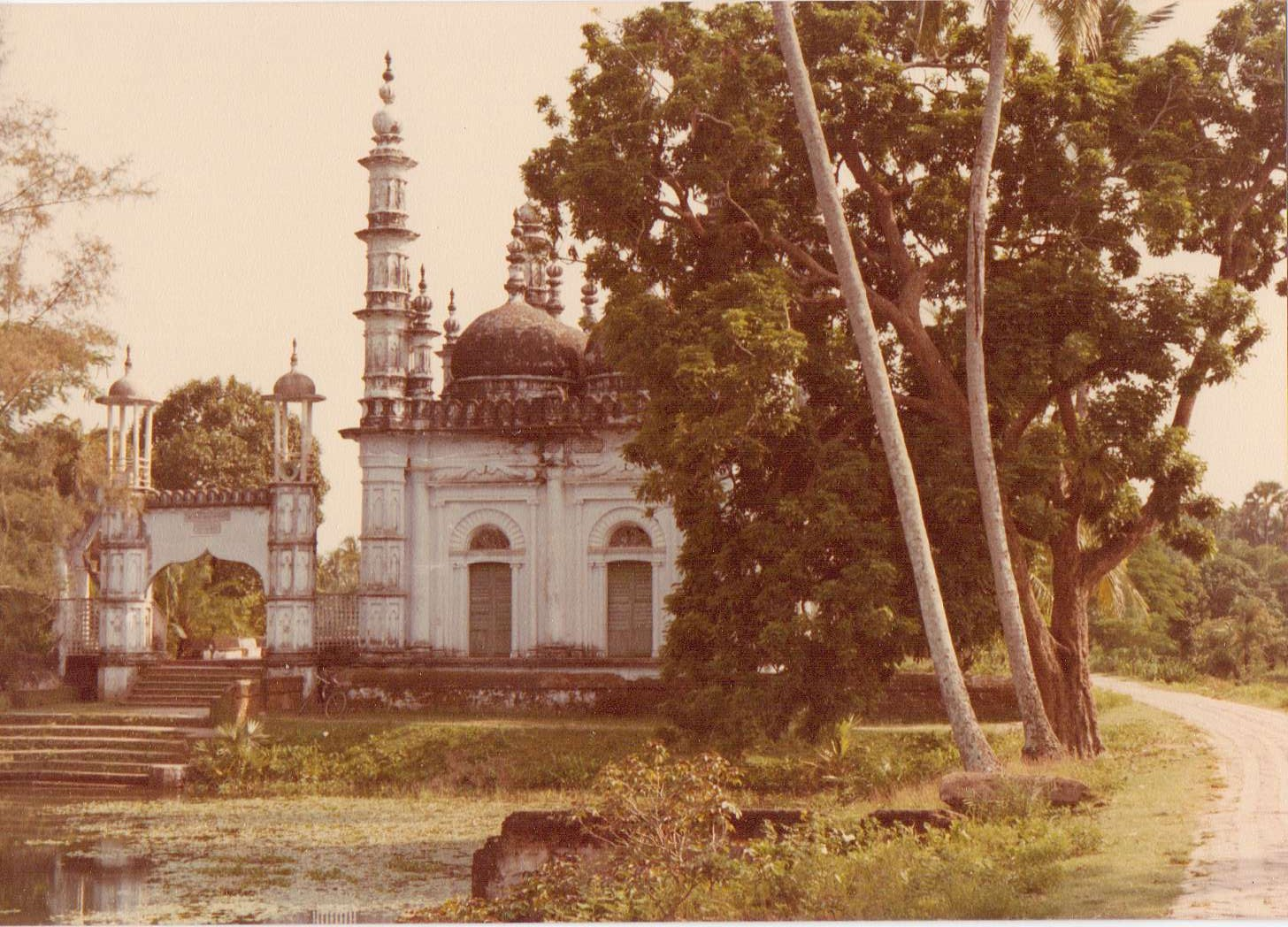
Tetulia Jame Mosque (1858–59)

Sundarbans is the largest single block of tidal halophytic mangrove forest in the world, is a World Heritage Site, and covers an area of 5,747 square kilometres (2,219 sq mi).

The region is home to many ancient buildings and temples such as Sultanpur Shahi Mosque (500 years old) and Pir-e-Kamel Kari Hafez Sah-Sufi Jonab Hazrat Maolana Azizur Rahman (Rh) was a Muslim Sufi Saint and local ruler Kalimakhali, assasuni upozila in Satkhira (now in Bangladesh). Attractions also include the mangrove forest at Kaliganj Upazila. This forest, named Basjharia Joarar Ban, is popularly known as the forest of BADHA. The Joarar Ban is a cause of friction between the Bangladesh and Indian border.

== Administration ==
Satkhira District upazila geocode map

The district consists of two municipalities, seven upazilas, 79 union parishads, 8 thanas (police stations) and 1,436 villages.

The upazilas are:

- Satkhira Sadar Upazila
- Assasuni Upazila
- Debhata Upazila
- Tala Upazila
- Kalaroa Upazila
- Kaliganj Upazila
- Shyamnagar Upazila

The two municipalities are Satkhira and Kalaroa.

- Chairman of District Council: Nazrul Islam
- Deputy Commissioner (DC): Mohammad Humayun Kabir

== Infrastructure ==
=== Health ===
==== Satkhira Government Hospital/Medical College ====
1	Satkhira Sadar Hospital
2	Satkhira Medical College & Hospital
3	Upazila Health Complex, Debhata
4	Upazila Health Complex, Kaliganj
5	Upazila Health Complex, Shyamnagar
6	Upazila Health Complex, Kalaroa
7	Upazila Health Complex, Tala
8	Upazila Health Complex, Assasuni

==== Satkhira Private Hospital/Clinic ====
1	Anwara Memorial Clinic
2	Bushra Hospital
3	Care Clinic
4	CB Hospital Limited.
5	City Clinic
6	Doctors Lab & Hospital (Pvt.) Ltd.
7	Dr. Mahtabuddin Memorial Hospital
8	Farhan Clinic
9	Grameen Eye Hospital, Satkhira
10	Heart Foundation and Intensive Care Hospital
11	Islami Bank Community Hospital Satkhira Ltd.
12	Jhaudanga Piles and Surgical Clinic
13	Nazmun Clinic
14	Sangram Medical Hospital (Pvt.)
15	Sanjana nursing home & clinic
16	Satata Clinic
17	Satkhira National Hospital
18	Satkhira Trauma & Orthopaedics Care Centre.

==== Satkhira Private Diagnostic Centre ====
1	Anwara Memorial Diagnostic Centre
2	Bushra Diagnostic Center
3	Care Diagnostic Centre
4	CB Hospital Limited
5	Digital Diagnostic & CT Scan Center
06	Islami Bank Community Hospital Satkhira Ltd.

=== Land ports ===
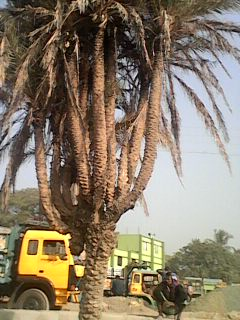
Bhomra land Port

India-Bangladesh (Bhomra Land Port): 200 yards distant BGP camp from the main port. The Bhomra land port is the second largest in Bangladesh. The Bhomra land customs station was inaugurated in 1996.

=== Transport ===
Roads and highways are Satkhira-Khulna, Satkhira-Jessore, Satkhira-Assasuni-Ghola, Satkhira-Kaligonj-Shyamnagar. Satkhira-Kaligonj-Shyamnagar is very bad due to the conductor's corruption.

== Education ==
Recently established one medical college, 79 colleges, one primary teacher's training institute, 421 high schools, 41 junior high schools, 259 madrassas, and 822 government primary schools. Some of the notable educational institutions are:

- Satkhira University of Science and Technology
- Satkhira Govt. Polytechnic Institute
- Satkhira Government College
- Satkhira City College
- Satkhira Medical College
- Satkhira Government Girls’ High School
- Satkhira Government High School
- Satkhira Government Mahila College
- Kaliganj Govt. College
- Satkhira Day-Night College
- Kalaroa Govt. College
- Jhaudanga High School

== Notable people ==
- A. F. M. Entaz Ali, member of parliament, is buried in Herar Chak of Debhata Upazila.
- Manoj Mitra
- Habibul Islam Habib, ex-MP, Satkhira-1. Publicity and Publication Affairs Secretary of Bangladesh Nationalist Party (BNP)
- Pori Moni, actress
- Khan Bahadur Ahsanullah
- AFM Ruhal Haque
- Soumya Sarkar
- Mustafizur Rahman
- Nilufar Yasmin
- Sabina Yasmin
- Amin Khan (actor)
- Moushumi
- Moushumi Hamid
- Falguni Hamid
- Tariq Anam Khan
- Afzal Hossain
- Rani Sarker
- Muhammad Wajed Ali
- Sikandar Abu Jafar
- Sabina Khatun
- Masura Parvin
- S.M Alauddin
- M.R. Khan
- Abu Yousuf MD. Abdullah, Academic and Entrepreneur.
- Kazi Ertaza Hassan - CIP]
- Shampa Goswami, teacher nad human rights activist

== See also ==
- Upazilas of Bangladesh
- Districts of Bangladesh
- Divisions of Bangladesh
- Upazila
- Thana
