= Syed Jalaluddin Hashmey =

Bengali politician (1894–1947)

- সৈয়দ জালালুদ্দীন হাশেমী

Speaker of the Bengal Legislative Assembly
- Incumbent
- Assumed office 27 April 1942
- Governor-General: Victor Hope
- Preceded by: Sir Azizul Haque
- Succeeded by: Nurul Amin
- Constituency: Satkhira

Deputy Speaker of the Bengal Legislative Assembly
- In office February 1942 – 27 April 1942
- Monarch: George VI
- Governor-General: Victor Hope
- Preceded by: M. Ashraf Ali

Deputy Speaker of the Bengal Legislative Council
- Incumbent
- Assumed office 1931
- Monarch: Edward VIII
- Governor-General: Freeman-Thomas
- Prime Minister: A. K. Fazlul Huq
- Succeeded by: Tafazzal Ali
- Constituency: Khulna

Personal details
- Born: 1 January 1894 Satkhira, Khulna district, Bengal Presidency
- Died: 9 January 1947 (aged 53) Calcutta, Bengal Presidency
- Party: Indian National Congress; Swaraj Party; Krishak Praja Party; Progressive Coalition Party
- Children: Syed Kamal Bakht
- Relatives: Syed Kamel Bakht; Syed Didar Bakht

Syed Jalaluddin Hashmey (Bengali: সৈয়দ জালালউদ্দিন হাশেমী; 1 January 1894 – 9 January 1947) was a Bengali politician. He served as a councillor of the Calcutta City Corporation and a member and deputy speaker of the Bengal Legislative Assembly, briefly serving as the acting Speaker. He was associated with the Krishak Praja Party from its very establishment.

== Early life and family ==
Hashmey was born in 1894 to a Hashemite Muslim family in the village of Tetulia in Tala, Satkhira subdivision, Khulna district, Bengal Presidency. His father, Maulvi Syed Alam Shah, was a native of Baffa in the Hazara District of the North-West Frontier Province, and settled in Tetulia at the start of the 19th century after being appointed as an imam by the Zamindars of Tetulia at the Tetulia Jami Mosque. During his youth, Hashmey lost his leg and began to rely on a wooden leg for daily activities. He was well-versed in the Bengali and English languages.

Hashmey is the father of Syed Kamal Bakht Saqi, a former president of the Satkhira Awami League and MP for Satkhira-1 (Tala-Kalaroa).

== Career ==
Hashmey was a member of the Bengal Provincial Congress Committee. He took part in the non-cooperation movement and was arrested several times. He was elected to the Bengal Legislative Council in 1929, representing the Swarajya Dal and the Muslims of Khulna. He served as the deputy speaker. In the 1937 Bengal elections, he was elected to the Satkhira constituency as a Krishak Praja Party candidate. In February 1942, Hashmey was re-elected as a Progressive Coalition Party candidate and made deputy speaker of the assembly in support of the Indian National Congress. On 29 April 1942, he was made the acting Speaker of the Assembly.

During the terms 1936-37 and 1939–40, Hashmey was an elected councillor of the Calcutta Corporation. He lost his Satkhira constituency in the 1946 Bengal elections as a Congress candidate.

== Death ==
Hashmey died on 9 January 1947 at his own home in Karraya road, Calcutta.
