= 2013–2014 Satkhira clashes =

Crackdown in Satkhira

2013–2014 Satkhira clashes refers to the crackdown on killed in a joint operation by Border Guards Bangladesh, Rapid Action Battalion and Bangladesh Police in different places of Satkhira district, Bangladesh, during the 2013 Bangladesh unrest. They began on December 16, 2013, and continued after the 2014 Bangladesh election. There are allegations that various formations of the Indian military participated in the crackdown, an allegation that the Bangladesh government denies.

== Clashes ==
=== Initial clashes ===
According to police, the clashes began when they were obstructed by Bangladesh Jamaat-e-Islami activists while arresting Jamaat activists Jahangir Hossain, Shahi Babu, Abdur Rouf, and Rizaul Islam, and one other in different parts of Satkhira. Police added that at one stage, they pelted them with brick chunks, for which the police had to fire on them "in self defense." Jahangir Hossain and Shahi Babu were shot dead, while Abdur Rouf and Rizaul Islam died in the hospital. Seven were arrested. Police Additional Superintendent Joydeb Chowdhury dismissed reports of multiple casualties as "rumors". The police bulldozed the home of former MP Abdul Khaleq and stole jewellery and money. During the crackdown, media was shut down from entering Satkhira. The government party Awami League claimed that 20 of its activists had been killed in Satkhira.

== Allegations of Indian troops presence ==
The Daily Inqilab reported that Indian forces had been deployed in Satkhira to quell the protestors. The report detailed an alleged fax, dated November 6, 2013, between the foreign ministry in Dhaka and the Bangladesh high commission in Delhi, requesting Indian troop presence in Satkhira. The alleged areas of deployment were Shyamnagar, Debhata, Assasuni, Kalaroa, and Satkhira Sadar of Satkhira. Jessore Cantonment was to be served as the base of operations.

According to The Daily Star, the alleged fax was circulating on Facebook, and the Inqilab simply picked it up without verification.

=== Reactions and arrest ===
The Ministry of Foreign Affairs vehemently denied the existence of the fax and dismissed the fax as fake and "photoshopped." The three journalists, including Robiulla Robi, the reporter, were arrested, and the printing press of the Daily Inqilab was sealed. BNP chairperson Khaleda Zia also demanded an explanation, saying, "Seeing the activities of the government, it doesn't seem that the country's independence and sovereignty are protected." The Daily Star termed the report "a let down for journalism".
