= Tipu =

Tipu may refer to:

== People ==
- Tipu Aziz, British-Bangladeshi neurosurgeon
- Tipu Munshi, Bangladeshi politician
- Tipu Shah, leader of the Pagal Panthi movement against the East India Company
- Tipu Sharif, Pakistani actor and singer-songwriter
- Tipu Sultan, 18th-century ruler of Mysore
- Tippu Tip or Tipu Tip, slave trader from Zanzibar and ruler of a state in Africa
- Adnan Shah Tipu or Tipu, Pakistani actor
- Ghulam Arieff Tipoo or Golam Arif Tipu, Bangladeshi jurist and language movement activist
- Golam Kibria Tipu, Bangladeshi politician
- Golam Sarwar Tipu, Bangladeshi footballer
- Ibrar Tipu, Bangladeshi composer and singer
- Mansoor Ali Tipu, Indian social worker
- Monirul Islam Tipu, Bangladeshi politician

== Others ==
- Tipu, Belize, a Mayan archaeological site near the Belize–Guatemala border
  - 1638 Tipu rebellion, Mayan revolt against the Spanish
- Tipu, Estonia, a village in Kõpu Parish, Viljandi County, Estonia
- Tipu's Tiger, automaton of Tipu Sultan, the ruler of Mysore in India
- Tipuana tipu, a South American tree
- Tipu, a character portrayed by Amin Gazi in the 2001 Indian film Lagaan

== See also ==
- Tippu (disambiguation)
- Tipu Sultan (disambiguation)
