= Begum Khaleda Zia Mahabiddalay =

College in Satkhira, Bangladesh

- Motto: Read on the name of god.
- Type: College
- Established: 2000; 26 years ago
- Affiliations: Board of Intermediate and Secondary Education, Jashore & National University, Bangladesh
- Principal: Abu Bakkar Siddique
- Students: 1000
- Undergraduates: 100
- Location: Kalaroa-Tala Road, Dhandia, Kalaroa, Satkhira, Khulna, 9413, Bangladesh; 22.8360°N 89.1163°E
- Campus: rural
- Colors: Blue and white
- Nickname: Dhandia College, Khaleda Zia College
- Website: begumkhaledaziamahabiddalay.jessoreboard.gov.bd

Begum Khaleda Zia Mahabiddalay is an educational institution located at Kalaroa Upazila in the Satkhira district of Bangladesh which was established in 2000. The college imparts education at higher secondary, and undergraduate levels under the Board of Intermediate and Secondary Education, Jashore, and National University. It is named after former prime minister Begum Khaleda Zia.

== History ==
Former MP Habibul Islam Habib established the college in 2000 in Dhanadia. Originally called Dhandia College, in 2001 it was renamed after then Prime Minister Begum Khaleda Zia and became Begum Khaleda Zia Mahabiddalay.
