= Kalaroa Govt. GKMK Pilot High School =

Kalaroa Govt. KGMK Pilot High School
- কলারোয়া সরকারি জি.কে.এম.কে. পাইলট মাধ্যমিক বিদ্যালয়

Location
- Jashore -Satkhira Highway; Kalaroa, Satkhira; 9410; Bangladesh; 22.8583°N 89.0394°E

Information
- Type: high school
- Motto: Come in search of education, go back to serve the nation.
- Established: 1930; 96 years ago
- Faculty: 56
- Grades: 6 to 10
- Enrollment: 900
- Language: Bengali
- Campus size: Large
- Campus type: urban
- Nickname: KGMKPHS
- Affiliation: Board of Intermediate and Secondary Education, Jashore
- Website: kalaroagkmkpilotsecondaryschool.jessoreboard.gov.bd

Kalaroa Govt. GKMK Pilot High School is a high school located in Kalaroa, Bangladesh. Its official name is Kalaroa Govt. Gopinathpur Kalaroa Murarikati Korunamoy Mitro High school.

== History ==
This institution was established by Korunamoy Mitro In 1930.

In 2018 the Govt nationalized the school with the name Kalaroa Govt. GKMK High School.

In 2023 the institution was again renamed as Kalaroa Govt. Gopinathpur Kalaroa Murarikati Korunamoy Mitro High School.

== Curriculum ==
It offers grades 6-10 under the Board of Intermediate and Secondary Education, Jashore and under Bangladesh Open University.
