= Government Brajalal College =

Educational institution in Khulna, Bangladesh

Coordinates: 22.8677°N 89.5294°E

- সরকারী ব্রজলাল কলেজ
- Other name: B. L. College
- Former names: Hindu Academy, Khulna
- Type: Public
- Established: 27 July 1902 (124 years ago)
- Founder: Brajalal Chakrobarti (Shastri)
- Affiliations: National University; Jashore Education Board
- Principal: Saiful Islam
- Faculty: 168
- Students: 18,790
- Undergraduates: 13,198
- Postgraduates: 4,517
- Other students: 1,075 (HSC)
- Location: B.L. College Road, Daulatpur, Khulna, Khulna Division, 9202, Bangladesh
- Campus: 41.32 acres (16.72 ha); Urban
- Website: blcollege.edu.bd

Government Brajalal College (Bengali: সরকারি ব্রজলাল কলেজ), also known as BL College, is one of the oldest institutions of higher education in Bangladesh. It is the oldest higher educational institute in Khulna. The college started as a sister institute of Hindu College under University of Calcutta.

== History ==
Govt. B L College, Khulna is an educational institution at Daulatpur in Khulna district. Babu Brajalal Chakrobarti (Shastri), a patron of education, established it first as Hindu Academy in July 1902, replicating the Hindu College that was established in Calcutta in 1816. Like the Hindu College, the Hindu Academy of Daulatpur had two branches, the Chatushpathi and the college or academy. Expenses of the Chatushpathi students including food, lodging and tuition, were borne by the institution. Only residential students were admitted at the beginning. The academy was managed by a board of trustees of whom Babu Brajalal was the chairman. The academy has been taking classes since 27 July 1902. Classes for the first and second year students began at a time. At its inception, the academy had only two tin-shed rooms with brick-and-cement floors and fence walls. At the beginning, the academy had only 2 acres (8,100 m^{2}) of land. Later, the Mohsin Fund donated 40 acres (160,000 m^{2}) of land from the Saidpur estate. The estate regularly disbursed a monthly donation of Rs 50 to the academy. The academy was given affiliation by Calcutta University in 1907.

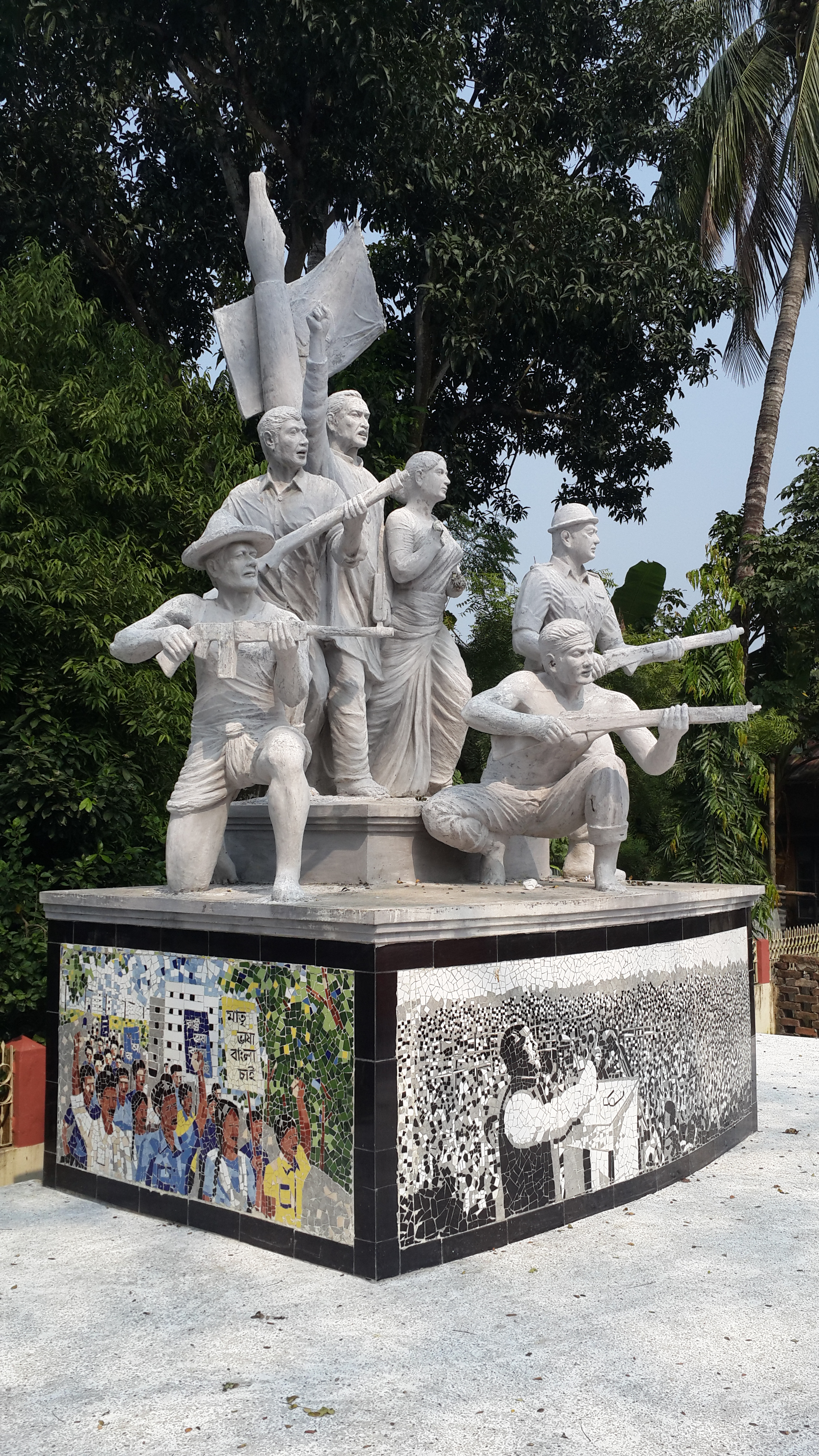
Liberation War Monument inside Govt. Barajalal College, Khulna

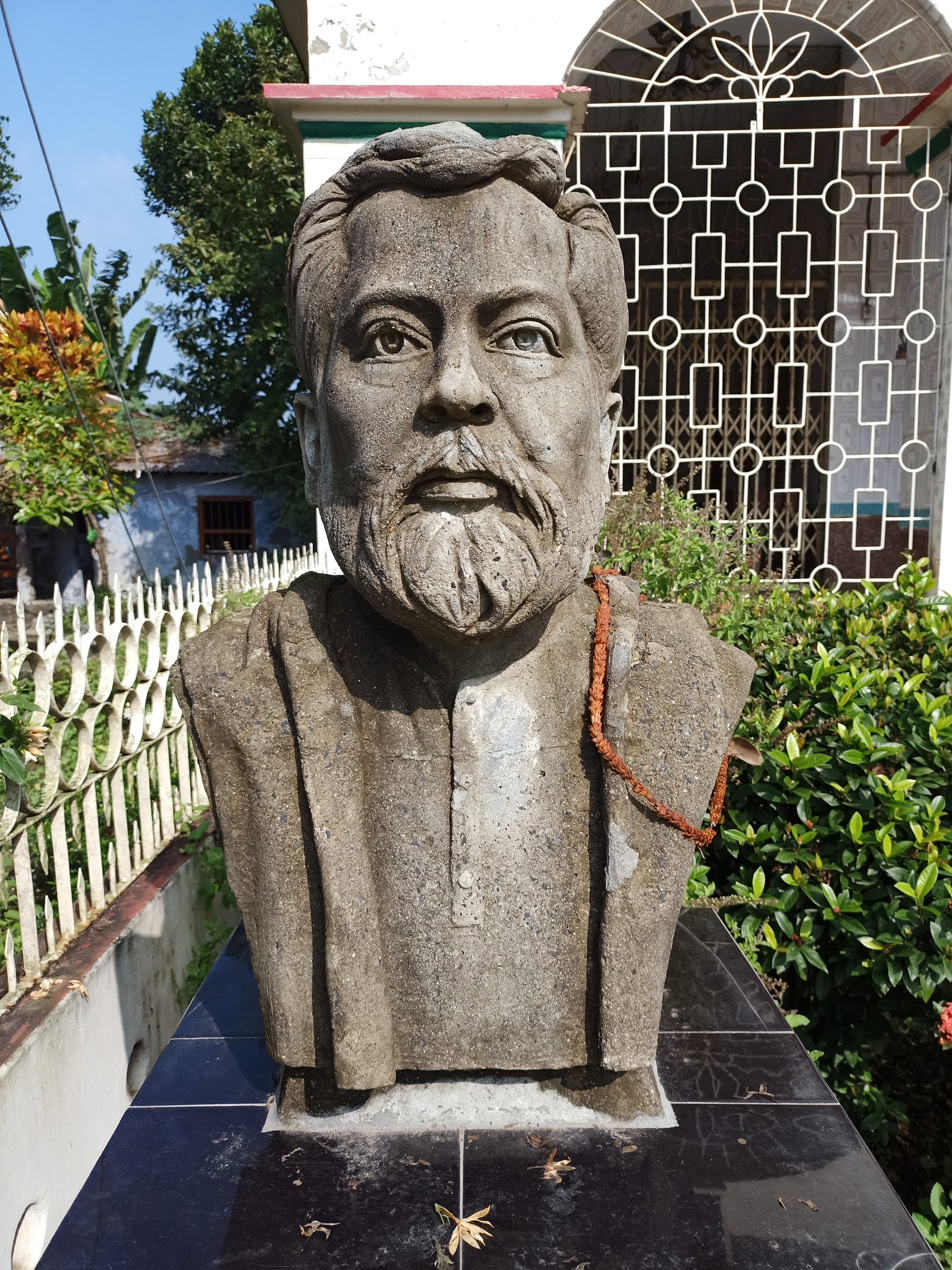
Founder of Government Brajalal College

A hostel for Muslim students was built in the college campus in 1910–11. At that time, Muslim students had to attend Arabic and the Persian classes in the Muslim Hostel outside the main building of the college. Later, education minister A. K. Fazlul Huq issued an order to appoint a Muslim teacher for the college. The first Muslim teacher appointed on a part-time basis was Mr. Musaddar Ali.

Babu Brajalal died on 8 August 1944. The institution was named Hindu Academy after him. Later, the academy was upgraded into a college and it received the shortened name of B L College. It was affiliated first to the University of Dhaka and then to the University of Rajshani and, still later, to the National University. The college was nationalised on 1 July 1967 and it was declared a university college in 1993. It offers Honours and Masters courses in almost all subjects: Bengali, English, philosophy, political science, economics, history, Islamic history, accounting, management, physics, chemistry, zoology, botany and mathematics. From 2010 it offers Honours in sociology.

=== Affiliation ===
University	Start	End
University of Calcutta	1907	
University of Dhaka		
University of Rajshahi		1992
National University	1992	present

== Faculty & Departments ==
=== Higher secondary ===
- Science
- Arts / Humanities
- Commerce / Business studies

=== Bachelor Degree (Pass) ===
- B. A. (Pass)
- B. S. S. (Pass)
- B. Sc. (Pass)
- B. B. S. (Pass)
- Certificate Course

=== Honours and Masters ===
Faculty	Departments	Honours	Masters Preliminary	Masters Final
Faculty of Arts	Bangla	Yes	Yes	Yes
Faculty of Arts	English	Yes	Yes	Yes
Faculty of Arts	Sanskrit	No	Yes	Yes
Faculty of Arts	History	Yes	Yes	Yes
Faculty of Arts	Philosophy	Yes	Yes	Yes
Faculty of Arts	Islamic Studies	No	Yes	Yes
Faculty of Arts	Islamic History & Culture	Yes	Yes	Yes
Faculty of Social Science	Sociology	Yes	Yes	Yes
Faculty of Social Science	Economics	Yes	Yes	Yes
Faculty of Social Science	Political Science	Yes	Yes	Yes
Faculty of Social Science	Social Work	Yes	No	Yes
Faculty of Science	Chemistry	Yes	Yes	Yes
Faculty of Science	Physics	Yes	Yes	Yes
Faculty of Science	Mathematics	Yes	Yes	Yes
Faculty of Science	Statistics	Yes	No	Yes
Faculty of Life & Earth Science	Botany	Yes	Yes	Yes
Faculty of Life & Earth Science	Zoology	Yes	Yes	Yes
Faculty of Life & Earth Science	Psychology	Yes	No	No
Faculty of Life & Earth Science	Geography and Environment	Yes	No	Yes
Faculty of Business Studies	Accounting	Yes	Yes	Yes
Faculty of Business Studies	Management Studies	Yes	Yes	Yes
Faculty of Business Studies	Marketing	Yes	No	Yes
Faculty of Business Studies	Finance and Banking	Yes	No	Yes

== Notable peoples ==
=== Notable faculty members ===
The list of notable faculty includes:

- Munier Chowdhury
- S. M. Amzad Hossain

=== Alumni ===
- A. K. A. Firoze Noon
- Babul Akter
- S. M. Babar Ali
- Syed Nausher Ali
- Hasan Azizul Huq
- Akhteruzzaman Babu
- Syed Kamel Bakht
- Gour Chandra Bala
- Panchanan Biswas
- Narayon Chandra Chanda
- Munier Choudhury
- Kalipada Das
- Chitta Ranjan Dutta
- Khandaker Abdul Hafeez
- Mohibul Haque
- Shaikh Yusuf Harun
- Farhad Hossain (politician)
- M. Nurul Islam
- Sarat Chandra Majumdar
- Golam Mostofa (poet)
- Mia Golam Parwar
- Ataur Rahman (politician, born 1951)
- S. M. Amzad Hossain
- Sheikh Abdus Salam
- Sohorab Ali Sana
- Amal Sen
- Qazi Shamsul Alam
- A. A. M. S. Arefin Siddique
- Salahuddin Yusuf
- Anwar Zahid

== See also ==
- Khulna University
- Khulna University of Engineering & Technology
