= Tipu Sultan (disambiguation) =

Tipu Sultan was the ruler of the Kingdom of Mysore in southern India.

Tipu Sultan may also refer to:

== People ==
- Tipu Sultan (politician) (born 1967), Bangladeshi politician
- Tipu Sultan (journalist) (born c. 1973), Bangladeshi freelance investigative journalist
- Tipu Sultan (cricketer) (born 1998), Bangladeshi cricketer
- Khan Tipu Sultan (1950–2017), Bangladeshi politician

== Arts and entertainment ==
- Tipu Sultan: The Tiger Lord, Pakistani television series about the sultan
- The Dreams of Tipu Sultan, Indian play about the sultan by Girish Karnad
- The Sword of Tipu Sultan, Indian television series about the sultan

== Other uses ==
- Tipu Sultan's Mausoleum or Gumbaz, Srirangapatna, mausoleum of Tippu Sultan in Seringapatam
- Tipu Sultan's Summer Palace, Bangalore, India
- Tipu Sultan Mosque, Kolkata, India
- Tipu Sultan Masjid Tollygunge, Kolkata, India
- Tipu Sultan Unani Medical College, Gulbarga, Karnataka, India
- Tipu Sultan Beach now Saddam Beach, Kerala, India

== See also ==
- Tipu (disambiguation)
- Siege of Seringapatam (1799), last stand of Tipu Sultan against the British
