= Md. Izzat Ullah =

Bangladesh Nationalist Party politician

- মোঃ ইজ্জত উল্লাহ

Members of Parliament
- Incumbent
- Assumed office 17 February 2026
- Preceded by: Feroz Ahammed Shapon
- Constituency: Satkhira-1

Personal details
- Born: January 26, 1956 (age 70)
- Party: Bangladesh Jamaat-e-Islami
- Occupation: Politician

Md. Izzat Ullah is a Bangladeshi politician with the Bangladesh Jamaat-e-Islami. He was elected as the Member of Parliament for the Satkhira-1 constituency in the 2026 Bangladeshi general election held on 12 February 2026

== Early life ==
Md. Izzat Ullah was born on 26 January 1956. His father is Yusuf Ali Sana and his mother is mrs. Rupjan Bibi.
