= Daily Inqilab =

Newspaper in Bangladesh

- শুধু দেশ ও জনগণের পক্ষে

- Daily Inqilab print on 10 January 2023.
- Type: Daily newspaper
- Format: Broadsheet
- Owner(s): Inqilab Enterprise & Publications Limited
- Founder: Maulana Abdul Mannan
- Publisher: A. M. M. Bahauddin
- Editor: A. M. M. Bahauddin
- Founded: 4 June 1986; 40 years ago
- Political alignment: Center-right
- Language: Bengali
- Headquarters: 2/1, RK Mission Road, Dhaka
- Country: Bangladesh
- Website: dailyinqilab.com
- Free online archives: dailyinqilab.com/archive

The Daily Inqilab (Note: Bengali: দৈনিক ইনকিলাব) is a daily newspaper based in Dhaka, Bangladesh. Founded on 1986 by Maulana Abdul Mannan and published by Inqilab Enterprise & Publications Limited.

== History ==
Daily Inqilab was founded by Maulana Abdul Mannan on 4 June 1986. The publication emerged during the military regime of Hussain Muhammad Ershad, amid a landscape of state-controlled media and limited press freedom in Bangladesh.

Former Committee to Protect Journalists Executive Director Ann K. Cooper wrote a letter to then Prime Minister Sheikh Hasina regarding the attack on the newspaper Daily Inqilab.

In 2002, it ranked among the ten dailies with the highest circulation, reflecting its effective adaptation to competitive pressures and early digital initiatives that foreshadowed its later online integration.

Awami League MP Abul Kalam Azad said that the Daily Inqilab received the highest amount of government advertising during the previous BNP-led government, receiving Tk 7.875 crore out of the Tk 129.75 crore spent by the government on advertisements between 2001 and 2006.

Fahima Bahauddin serves as the Executive Director of The Daily Inqilab. She is also the Online Editor, responsible for the newspaper’s online, multimedia, and English-language editions. Her sister, Nazifa Bahauddin, serves as the Executive Editor of The Daily Inqilab, a national daily newspaper in Bangladesh, and is involved in its administrative operations.

In 2014, reports suggested that the circulation of Daily Inqilab had increased, along with that of other newspapers, despite an overall decline in newspaper readership due to competition from television and online media.

=== Attack on the office ===
In 1994, four press photographers were beaten at the funeral of Jahanara Imam. Afterward, a mob attacked the offices of the Daily Inqilab, fired several shots, and beat the driver of a vehicle owned by the newspaper’s editor.

=== Shutdown and arrest ===
In January 2014, the Awami League government sealed the Daily Inqilab printing press and detained four journalists on the grounds that the newspaper had published a report claiming that Indian security forces had been deployed in Satkhira District to suppress protests.

Bangladesh Nationalist Party protested the shutdown of Daily Inqilab and the arrest of a journalist in 2014 after the newspaper published a report about clashes in Satkhira and alleged Indian involvement.

== Notable works ==
=== 2013–2014 Satkhira clashes ===
In 2014, during clashes in Satkhira, Inqilab reported that Indian forces had been deployed there to quell the protests. The report detailed an alleged fax, dated 6 November 2013, exchanged between the Ministry of Foreign Affairs and the High Commission of Bangladesh, New Delhi requesting the deployment of Indian troops in Satkhira.

Titled "Military Aid from India and Deployment at Satkhira," the alleged fax and accompanying email named real individuals and included their official designations. The body of the fax referred to a letter received from Brigadier General Noor Md. Noor Islam, who had presumably sought information about purported instructions from the Prime Minister’s Office.

The document suggested deploying the Indian Army’s 33rd Corps, based in West Bengal, which consisted of the 17th, 20th, and 27th Mountain Divisions. Four categories were listed for the proposed deployment: rapid-response, armored, artillery, and signal and engineering units. However, at the time the fax was sent, only the first category—rapid-response units—had been confirmed; the others had not. According to the fax, the number of personnel to be deployed was to be agreed upon with the Jessore GOC of the Bangladesh Army. The fax also mentioned "transfer and infiltration channels" through which Indian troops could enter Bangladesh to participate in the operation. These included Bhomra in Satkhira.

Third, it listed the Assasuni and Satkhira Sadar police stations as intelligence hubs, with Jessore Cantonment identified as an additional option. Fourth, it specified the "areas of engagement" for the proposed Indian troop deployment. These areas comprised five of Satkhira’s seven upazilas: Shyamnagar, Debhata, Assasuni, Kalaroa, and Satkhira Sadar.

== Legal issues ==
In June 2020, Daily Inqilab editor AMM Bahauddin and journalist Selim Sarkar were sued under the Digital Security Act over an article titled "Remove HT Imam." The complaint alleged that the article defamed HT Imam, the prime minister’s political affairs adviser, and tarnished the image of the government and the country. Later, in August 2020, Awami League Presidium Member and former Shipping Minister Shajahan Khan filed a separate defamation case against Bahauddin concerning a report about his daughter’s COVID-19 test.

On 24 November 2022, Noman Group filed a defamation case against Daily Inqilab editor A. M. M. Bahauddin and reporter Sayeed Ahmed over a report alleging Tk 10,000 crore in loan-related embezzlement. The company sought Tk 2,000 crore in compensation, claiming the report damaged its reputation.

== Controversies ==
In a 2014 report, The Daily Star stated that the alleged fax had been circulating on Facebook and that Inqilab had simply published it without verification. The Ministry of Foreign Affairs vehemently denied the existence of the fax and dismissed it as fake. The three journalists involved, including reporter Robiulla Robi, were arrested, and Inqilab’s printing press was sealed. The Daily Star described the report as "a letdown for journalism."

In July 2026, Rumor Scanner Bangladesh published an analysis of misinformation identified in Bangladeshi media during the first six months of the year. The analysis covered 681 reports from 177 media outlets, including 21 reports published by The Daily Inqilab on its website and social media platforms that were identified as containing false information. Among the outlets included in the analysis, The Daily Inqilab had the highest number of such reports. The identified content primarily involved old videos, scripted material, and AI-generated content that had circulated online.

It is supportive of Hefazat-e-Islam Bangladesh with opposition to Jamaat-e-Islami Bangladesh.

== See also ==
- Censorship in Bangladesh
- List of newspapers in Bangladesh
- Mass media in Bangladesh
