= Workers Party of Bangladesh =

Bangladeshi political party

Workers Party of Bangladesh বাংলাদেশের ওয়ার্কার্স পার্টি
- Abbreviation: WPB
- President: Rashed Khan Menon; Mahmudul Hasan Manik (acting)
- Secretary-General: Fazle Hossain Badsha; Nur Ahmad Bakul (acting)
- Founded: 1980
- Merger of: Bangladesh Communist Party (Leninist); Revolutionary Communist League; Majdur Party
- Headquarters: 31/F, Topkhana Road, Dhaka - 1000
- Student wing: Bangladesh Chhatra Maitri
- Youth wing: Bangladesh Jubo Maitri
- Women's wing: Nari Mukti Sangsad
- Labour front: Jatio Sramik Federation Bangladesh
- Peasant front: Jatio Krishok Somity
- Ideology: Communism; Marxism–Leninism
- Political position: Far-left
- International affiliation: IMCWP; ICMLPO (defunct); IPA
- Colours: Red
- Bangladesh Parliament: 0 / 300

Party flag

Website
- www.wpbd71.org

The Workers Party of Bangladesh (Bengali: বাংলাদেশের ওয়ার্কার্স পার্টি) is a Marxist-Leninist party in Bangladesh. Rashed Khan Menon is the president of the Workers Party of Bangladesh and Fazle Hossain Badsha is the general secretary of the party.

== History ==
WPB was founded in 1980 by the Bangladesh Communist Party (Leninist), Revolutionary Communist League, Majdur Party and another group. Amal Sen was the founding general secretary.

In 1984, the party split in two factions, both using the name WPB. One group was led by Amal Sen and Nazrul Islam. The other was led by the current president of the party, Rashed Khan Menon. In 1992, they reunited.

The party participated in the programs of the National Committee to Protect Oil, Gas, Mineral Resources, Power and Ports in 2006.

In November 2008, the Workers Party protested the removal of a baul statue by the Roads and Highways Department, and Civil Aviation Authority, Bangladesh following pressure from Islamists near the Zia International Airport.

In 2010, the Haider Akbar Khan Rono-led fraction of the Workers Party of Bangladesh (reconstituted) merged with the Communist Party of Bangladesh.

WPB joined the Grand Alliance in 2014, but the party leadership openly questioned the direction of the subsequent 14 Party Alliance after the 2014 election. Rashed Khan Menon was made the Minister for Civil Aviation and Tourism in the Sheikh Hasina led cabinet.

On 26 May 2016, Workers Party of Bangladesh called for the parliamentary membership of Salim Osman to be cancelled for insulting Shyamal Kanti Bhakta, the principal of Piyar Sattar Latif High School.

In the 2018 Bangladesh elections, it contested as part of the Grand Alliance along with the Bangladesh Awami League. Five candidates of the Workers Party used the election symbol of the Awami League, the boat. The candidates were Fazle Hossain Badsha from Rajshahi-2, Mustafa Lutfullah from Satkhira-1, Rashed Khan Menon from Dhaka-8, Tipu Sultan from Barisal-3, and Yeasin Ali from Thakurgaon-3. Three candidates of the party contested using the hammer symbol of the workers party. They were Ahsan Ullah from Comilla-8, Haji Bashirul Alam from Cox's Bazar-1, and Jahirul Haque Tutul from Barisal-2. The Workers Party won four seats in the Jatiya Sangsad in the 2018 Bangladeshi general election. Lutfun Nesa Khan was elected from the reserved women's seat from the Workers Party. The winners were Fazle Hossain Badsha from Rajshahi-2, Mustafa Lutfullah from Satkhira-1, and Rashed Khan Menon from Dhaka-8. The Awami League did not include them in the new cabinet which only had Awami League politicians.

In February 2021, the Workers Party criticised Awami League for election policy and for not taking a hardline against religion-based political parties. In December, the party asked the government to send former Prime Minister Khaleda Zia abroad for medical treatment.

== Election results ==
=== Jatiya Sangsad elections ===
Election	Party leader	Votes		Seats			Position		Government
Election	Party leader	#	%	Contested	Won	+/–	(Seats)	(Votes)	Government
1986	Amal Sen	151,828	0.53%		3 / 300	New	10th	11th	Opposition
1988	Amal Sen	Boycotted			0 / 300	▼3	—N/a	—N/a	Extra-parliamentary
1991	Amal Sen	63,434	0.19%	35	1 / 300	▲1	▲12th	▲20th	Opposition
Feb 1996	Amal Sen	Boycotted			0 / 300	▼1	—N/a	—N/a	Extra-parliamentary
Jun 1996	Amal Sen	56,404	0.13%	34	0 / 300	0	N/A	▲8th	Extra-parliamentary
2001	Rashed Khan Menon	40,484	0.07%	32	0 / 300	0	N/A	▼11th	Extra-parliamentary
2008	Rashed Khan Menon	262,093	0.37%	5	2 / 300	▲2	▲5th	▲7th	Coalition Government
2014	Rashed Khan Menon	359,620	2.10%	18	6 / 300	▲4	▲3rd	▲3rd	Coalition Government
2018	Rashed Khan Menon	646,064	0.76%	8	4 / 300	▼2	▼4th	▼5th	Coalition Government
2024	Rashed Khan Menon	250,251	0.71%	26	1 / 300	▼3	4th	▲4th	Coalition Government

== See also ==
- Revolutionary Workers Party of Bangladesh
