= Syed Kamal Bakht =

Bangladeshi politician

- সৈয়দ কামাল বখত

Member of 1st Jatiya Sangsad
- In office 7 March 1973 – 6 November 1976
- Succeeded by: M. Mansur Ali
- Constituency: Khulna-13

Member of 3rd Jatiya Sangsad
- In office 7 May 1986 – 3 March 1988
- Preceded by: M. Mansur Ali
- Succeeded by: Syed Didar Bakht
- Constituency: Satkhira-1

Member of 7th Jatiya Sangsad
- In office 12 June 1996 – 1999
- Preceded by: Habibul Islam Habib
- Succeeded by: BM Nazrul Islam
- Constituency: Satkhira-1

Personal details
- Born: 1930 Tetulia, Satkhira, Khulna District
- Died: 15 December 2000 (aged 69–70)
- Party: Bangladesh Awami League
- Parent: Syed Jalaluddin Hashmey (father)
- Relatives: Syed Didar Bakht; Bijli Ahmed (sister); Syed Kamel Bakht

Syed Kamal Bakht (1930 – 15 December 2000) was a Bangladeshi politician and a Member of Parliament of Satkhira-1.

== Early life ==
Syed Kamal Bakht was born in 1930, to a renowned Bengali Muslim Syed family also known as the Hashimi family in the village of Tetulia in Tala, Satkhira, Khulna District. His father, Syed Jalaluddin Hashmey, was a Speaker at the Bengal Legislative Assembly. As a part of the Muslim Student League, he took part in the Bengali language movement.

== Career ==
Bakht successfully won a seat in the 1970 Pakistani general elections but did not become a member of the National Assembly of Pakistan due to the outbreak of the Bangladesh Liberation War. He played an important role as a freedom fighter. He was elected to parliament from Khulna-13 as an Awami League candidate following the 1973 Bangladeshi general elections. He lost this seat in the next election to M. Mansur Ali but regained it in 1986 when the constituency was renamed to Satkhira-1. He served in this second term until 1988, in which he lost it to his relative Syed Didar Bakht of the Jatiya Party. At the 1991 Bangladeshi general election, Bakht again lost, this time to Jamaat-e-Islami politician Ansar Ali. He managed to defeat Ali at the subsequent 1996 Bangladeshi general election.

== Death ==
Bakht died of old age on 15 December 2000.
