= Barisal-3 =

Constituency of Bangladesh's Jatiya Sangsad

Coordinates: 22.91°N 90.41°E

- Constituency for the Jatiya Sangsad
- District: Barisal District
- Division: Barisal Division
- Electorate: 332,097 (2026)

Current constituency
- Created: 1973
- Parliamentary Party: Bangladesh Nationalist Party
- Member of Parliament: Zainul Abedin
- ← 120 Barisal-2 122 Barisal-4 →

Barisal-3 is a constituency represented in the Jatiya Sangsad (National Parliament) of Bangladesh.

== Boundaries ==
The constituency encompasses Babuganj and Muladi upazilas.

== History ==
The constituency was created for the first general elections in newly independent Bangladesh, held in 1973.

Ahead of the 2008 general election, the Election Commission redrew constituency boundaries to reflect population changes revealed by the 2001 Bangladesh census. The 2008 redistricting altered the boundaries of the constituency.

== Members of Parliament ==
Election	Member	Party
1973	Motahar Uddin	Bangladesh Awami League
1979	M. M. Nazrul Islam	Bangladesh Awami League
1986	Mohammad Abdul Barek	Jatiya Party (Ershad)
1991	Mosharraf Hossain Mongu	Bangladesh Nationalist Party
1996	Mosharraf Hossain Mongu	Bangladesh Nationalist Party
2001	Mosharraf Hossain Mongu	Bangladesh Nationalist Party
2008	Golam Kibria Tipu	Jatiya Party (Ershad)
2014	Tipu Sultan	Workers Party of Bangladesh
2018	Golam Kibria Tipu	Jatiya Party (Ershad)
2024	Golam Kibria Tipu	Jatiya Party (Ershad)
2026	Zainul Abedin (barisal politician)	Bangladesh Nationalist Party

== Elections ==
=== Elections in the 2020s ===
General election 2026: Barisal-3
Party	Candidate	Votes	%	±%
BNP	Zainul Abedin	80,930	46.48	+6.78
AB Party	Mohammad Asaduzzaman Bhuiyan	61,192	35.14	N/A
Majority		19,738	11.34	+7.14
Turnout		174,143	52.44	−30.36
Registered electors		332,097		
BNP gain from JP(E)				

=== Elections in the 2010s ===
General Election 2014: Barisal-3
Party	Candidate	Votes	%	±%
WPB	Tipu Sultan	35,602	60.3	N/A
JP(E)	Golam Kibria Tipu	23,407	39.7	−4.3
Majority		12,195	20.7	+16.5
Turnout		59,009	27.2	−55.6
WPB gain from JP(E)				

=== Elections in the 2000s ===
General Election 2008: Barisal-3
Party	Candidate	Votes	%	±%
JP(E)	Golam Kibria Tipu	66,463	44.0	N/A
BNP	Selima Rahman	60,051	39.7	−16.1
Independent	Jainul Abedin	20,048	13.3	N/A
Independent	Ishaque Sikder	2,675	1.8	N/A
Zaker Party	Nur Mohammad Howlader	1,574	1.0	N/A
BKA	Master Ansar Uddin	397	0.3	N/A
Majority		6,412	4.2	−15.1
Turnout		151,208	82.8	+18.0
JP(E) gain from BNP				

General Election 2001: Barisal-3
Party	Candidate	Votes	%	±%
BNP	Mosharraf Hossain Mongu	71,638	55.8	+6.3
AL	Md. Afjalul Karim	46,832	36.5	+4.9
IJOF	Syed Badrul Hossain	9,317	7.3	N/A
JSD	M. A. Nayan Rahman	296	0.2	N/A
Jatiya Party (M)	Md. Ishaq Bhuyan	226	0.2	N/A
Independent	Md. Abdul Mazid	110	0.1	N/A
Independent	Bakhtiar Uddin Khan Iqbal	50	0.0	N/A
Majority		24,806	19.3	+1.4
Turnout		128,469	64.8	−6.9
BNP hold				

=== Elections in the 1990s ===
General Election June 1996: Barisal-3
Party	Candidate	Votes	%	±%
BNP	Mosharraf Hossain Mongu	48,041	49.5	+20.0
AL	Abdul Bari	30,665	31.6	+8.1
IOJ	Md. Humayun Kabir Chowdhury	5,889	6.1	N/A
Jamaat	Syed Md. Nurul Haque	5,672	5.8	−12.0
JP(E)	Anwar Hossain	5,171	5.3	+4.9
Social Democratic Party	Syed Badrul Hossain	879	0.9	N/A
CPB	FRM Nazmul Ahsan	263	0.3	0.0
Jatiya Samajtantrik Dal-JSD	M. A. Nayon Rahman	241	0.2	−0.1
Independent	A. T. M. Mahabub Alam	207	0.2	N/A
Majority		17,376	17.9	+11.9
Turnout		97,028	71.7	+34.0
BNP hold				

General Election 1991: Barisal-3
Party	Candidate	Votes	%	±%
BNP	Mosharraf Hossain Mongu	23,777	29.5	
AL	Abdul Bari	18,952	23.5	
Independent	Md. Tofazzal Haq Chowdhury	15,477	19.2	
Jamaat	Syed Narul Haq	14,346	17.8	
Independent	Md. Abdul Kader Faruki	2,756	3.4	
JSD	Moshtak Hossain	2,557	3.2	
IOJ	Sultan Ahmed	1,452	1.8	
JP(E)	Begam Hasina Nazrul	348	0.4	
Jatiya Samajtantrik Dal-JSD	Gulzar Alauddin	241	0.3	
Jatiya Biplobi Front	Ohid Khan	232	0.3	
CPB	Nazmul Ahsan	211	0.3	
Bangladesh National Congress	Hossain Ali	138	0.2	
Majority		4,825	6.0	
Turnout		80,487	37.7	
BNP gain from JP(E)				
