= Workers Party of Bangladesh (reconstituted) =

Workers Party of Bangladesh (reconstituted) বাংলাদেশের ওয়ার্কার্স পার্টি (পুনর্গঠিত)
- Founder: Haider Akbar Khan Rono
- Split from: Workers Party of Bangladesh
- Merged into: Communist Party of Bangladesh
- Ideology: Communism; Marxism–Leninism
- Political position: Far-left

The Workers Party of Bangladesh (reconstituted) was a political party in Bangladesh. Haider Akbar Khan Rano was the convenor of the party. Rano had led a group of dissident leaders of the Workers Party of Bangladesh, who had broken away from WPB in connection with the December 2008 parliamentary election. Rano's group, which formed the WPB(reconstituted) opposed the alliance between the Workers Party and the Awami League and the participation of WPB candidates in the election on the Awami League election symbol.

In September 2009 Abdul Matin, a hero of the Language movement, joined the party. Matin was included in the Central Committee of the party. Afterwards he joined to the party United Communist League of Bangladesh.

On 26 February 2010, the Workers Party of Bangladesh (reconstituted) merged into the Communist Party of Bangladesh. Haider Akbar Khan Rano was included in the presidium of CPB and Mohamed Habibur Rahman and Shahrier Mohammad Firoj were appointed Central Committee members of CPB.
