= Bangladesh Communist Party (Leninist) =

Bangladeshi political party

Bangladesh Communist Party (Leninist) বাংলাদেশ কমিউনিস্ট পার্টি (লেনিনবাদী)
- Abbreviation: BCP(L)
- Founder: Kazi Zafar Ahmed, Rashed Khan Menon, Haider Akbar Khan Rono, Amal Sen and others
- Founded: September/November 1971
- Dissolved: 18/6 December 1980
- Merged into: WPB
- Ideology: Communism; Leninism; Maoism
- Political position: Far-left
- Colors: Red

The Bangladesh Communist Party (Leninist) (Bengali: বাংলাদেশ কমিউনিস্ট পার্টি (লেনিনবাদী), abbreviated: BCP(L)) was a communist party in Bangladesh. BCP(L) was founded in Calcutta in the fall of 1971, by several small communist splinter factions. The core of founders of BCP(L) consisted of Kazi Zafar Ahmed, Rashed Khan Menon and Haider Akbar Khan Rono from the Communist Samanay Kendra, Amal Sen and Nazrul Islam from Communist Sanghati Kendra and Nasim Ali from the Hatiar group. Communist Samanay Kendra originated from the students movement and Communist Sanghati Kendra was a splinter group Communist Party of Bangladesh (Marxist–Leninist) that had revolted against the annihilation line.

Amal Sen was elected secretary of the party. BCP(L) projected itself as neither loyal to Moscow nor Beijing. BCP(L) had a close link with the Communist Party of India (Marxist) from its foundation. In 1973 is formed part of the opposition alliance formed by National Awami Party (Bhashani).

The party contested the 1973 general election. In 1974 BCP(L) launched the United People's Party as their open frontal party. In 1979 Kazi Zafar Ahmed left the party and joined Ziaur Rahman. In 1980, on the 102nd birth anniversary of Joseph Stalin, BCP(L) merged with some other groups and formed the Workers Party of Bangladesh.
