= Satkhira-1 =

Constituency of Bangladesh's Jatiya Sangsad

Coordinates: 22.75°N 89.26°E

- Constituency for the Jatiya Sangsad
- District: Satkhira District
- Division: Khulna Division
- Electorate: 423,073 (2018)

Current constituency
- Created: 1984
- Party: Bangladesh Jamaat-e-Islami
- Member of Parliament: Md. Izzat Ullah
- ← 104 Khulna-6 106 Satkhira-2 →

Satkhira-1 is a constituency represented in the Jatiya Sangsad (National Parliament) of Bangladesh.

== Boundaries ==
The constituency encompasses Kalaroa and Tala upazilas.

== History ==
The constituency was created in 1984 from the Khulna-13 constituency when the former Khulna District was split into three districts: Bagerhat, Khulna, and Satkhira.

== Members of Parliament ==
| Election | Member | Party |
|---|---|---|
| 1986 | Syed Kamal Bakht | Awami League |
| 1988 | Syed Didar Bakht | Jatiya Party |
| 1991 | Ansar Ali | Jamaat-e-Islami |
| Feb 1996 | Habibul Islam Habib | BNP |
| Jun 1996 | Syed Kamal Bakht | Awami League |
| 1999 by-election | BM Nazrul Islam | Awami League |
| 2001 | Habibul Islam Habib | BNP |
| 2008 | Sheikh Mujibur Rahman | Awami League |
| 2014 | Mustafa Lutfullah | Workers Party |
| 2024 | Feroz Ahammed Shapon | Awami League |
| 2026 | Md. Izzat Ullah | Bangladesh Jamaat-e-Islami |

== Elections ==
=== Elections in the 2010s ===
General Election 2014: Satkhira-1
| Party | Candidate | Votes | % | ±% |
|---|---|---|---|---|
| WPB | Mustafa Lutfullah | 92,200 | 79.6 | N/A |
| Independent | SM Mujibur Rahman | 23,613 | 20.4 | N/A |
| Majority | | 68,587 | 59.2 | +50.5 |
| Turnout | | 115,813 | 30.5 | −62.2 |
| WPB gain from AL | | | | |

=== Elections in the 2000s ===
General Election 2008: Satkhira-1
| Party | Candidate | Votes | % | ±% |
|---|---|---|---|---|
| AL | SM Mujibur Rahman | 168,298 | 54.1 | +12.1 |
| BNP | Habibul Islam Habib | 141,164 | 45.4 | −8.2 |
| IAB | FM Asadul Haque | 1,774 | 0.6 | N/A |
| Majority | | 27,134 | 8.7 | −2.8 |
| Turnout | | 311,236 | 92.7 | +2.8 |
| AL gain from BNP | | | | |

General Election 2001: Satkhira-1
| Party | Candidate | Votes | % | ±% |
|---|---|---|---|---|
| BNP | Habibul Islam Habib | 145,930 | 53.6 | +35.6 |
| AL | SM Mujibur Rahman | 114,527 | 42.0 | +7.2 |
| IJOF | G. M. Abdul Ali | 9,032 | 3.3 | N/A |
| WPB | Mustafa Lutfullah | 2,611 | 1.0 | N/A |
| Jatiya Party (M) | Sheikh Altaf Mahmud | 255 | 0.1 | N/A |
| Independent | Syed Didar Bakht | 93 | 0.0 | N/A |
| Majority | | 31,403 | 11.5 | −0.1 |
| Turnout | | 272,448 | 89.9 | +3.2 |
| BNP gain from AL | | | | |

=== Elections in the 1990s ===
General Election June 1996: Satkhira-1
| Party | Candidate | Votes | % | ±% |
|---|---|---|---|---|
| AL | Syed Kamal Bakht | 76,718 | 34.8 | −1.6 |
| Jamaat | Ansar Ali | 51,054 | 23.2 | −16.3 |
| JP(E) | Syed Didar Bakht | 50,630 | 23.0 | +20.2 |
| BNP | Habibul Islam Habib | 39,612 | 18.0 | −1.2 |
| IOJ | Md. Asadul Haque | 1,367 | 0.6 | N/A |
| Jatiya Samajtantrik Dal-JSD | Abdus Salam | 671 | 0.3 | 0.0 |
| JSD | Mir Abul Kalam Azad | 382 | 0.2 | N/A |
| FP | S. M. Jalal Uddin | 76 | 0.0 | −0.1 |
| Majority | | 25,664 | 11.6 | +8.5 |
| Turnout | | 220,510 | 86.7 | +11.3 |
| AL gain from Jamaat | | | | |

General Election 1991: Satkhira-1
| Party | Candidate | Votes | % | ±% |
|---|---|---|---|---|
| Jamaat | Ansar Ali | 72,692 | 39.5 | |
| AL | Syed Kamal Bakht | 67,053 | 36.4 | |
| BNP | ABM Altaf Hossain | 35,379 | 19.2 | |
| JP(E) | Sk. Motlub Hossain | 5,088 | 2.8 | |
| Bangladesh Muslim League (Kader) | Sk. Moniruzzaman | 956 | 0.5 | |
| UCL | Md. Abdur Rouf | 935 | 0.5 | |
| Independent | Porimol | 779 | 0.4 | |
| Bangladesh Jatiya Tanti Dal | Fazlul Karim | 626 | 0.3 | |
| Jatiya Samajtantrik Dal-JSD | Abdus Salam | 564 | 0.3 | |
| FP | Md. Mufil Islam | 178 | 0.1 | |
| Majority | | 5,639 | 3.1 | |
| Turnout | | 184,250 | 75.4 | |
| Jamaat gain from JP(E) | | | | |
