= Habibul Islam Habib =

Bangladeshi politician

- হাবিবুল ইসলাম হাবিব

Member of Bangladesh Parliament

Assembly Member for Satkhira-1
- In office February 1996 – May 1996
- Preceded by: Ansar Ali
- Succeeded by: Syed Kamal Bakht
- In office 2001–2008
- Preceded by: BM Nazrul Islam
- Succeeded by: SM Mujibur Rahman

Personal details
- Born: Kalaroa, Satkhira, Bangladesh
- Party: Bangladesh Nationalist Party
- Children: 2
- Education: University of Dhaka

Habibul Islam Habib is a politician who is secretary of publication affairs of the Bangladesh Nationalist Party and a former member of parliament for Satkhira-1.

== Early life and education ==
He was born in 1965 in Kalaroa Upozila in Satkhira District from a renowned muslim family. Completing his education from school & college level, he was admitted in the University of Dhaka on 1985 in the Department of Physics. In 1990, He was elected as Science Auditorium Affairs Secretary of DUCSU.

== Career ==
Habib was elected to parliament from Satkhira-1 as a Bangladesh Nationalist Party candidate in 2001. In 2015, he was charged with attacking a convoy of Prime Minister Sheikh Hasina in Satkhira in 2002.
