= BM Nazrul Islam =

Bangladeshi politician (1946–2022)

- বি এম নজরুল ইসলাম

Member of Parliament for Satkhira-1
- In office 1999 – 13 July 2001
- Preceded by: Syed Kamal Bakht
- Succeeded by: Habibul Islam Habib

Personal details
- Born: 1 December 1946
- Died: 7 April 2022 (aged 75) Dhaka, Bangladesh
- Party: Bangladesh Awami League

BM Nazrul Islam (1 December 1946 – 7 April 2022) was a Bangladesh Awami League politician. He served as Jatiya Sangsad member representing the Satkhira-1 constituency during 1999–2001.

== Career ==
Islam was elected to parliament from Satkhira-1 as a Bangladesh Awami League candidate in 1999 by-election. The election was called after the incumbent, Syed Kamal Bakht, died in office. He was a chairman of Kalaroa upazila.
