= Zainul Abedin (Barisal politician) =

Bangladeshi politician

- জয়নুল আবেদীন
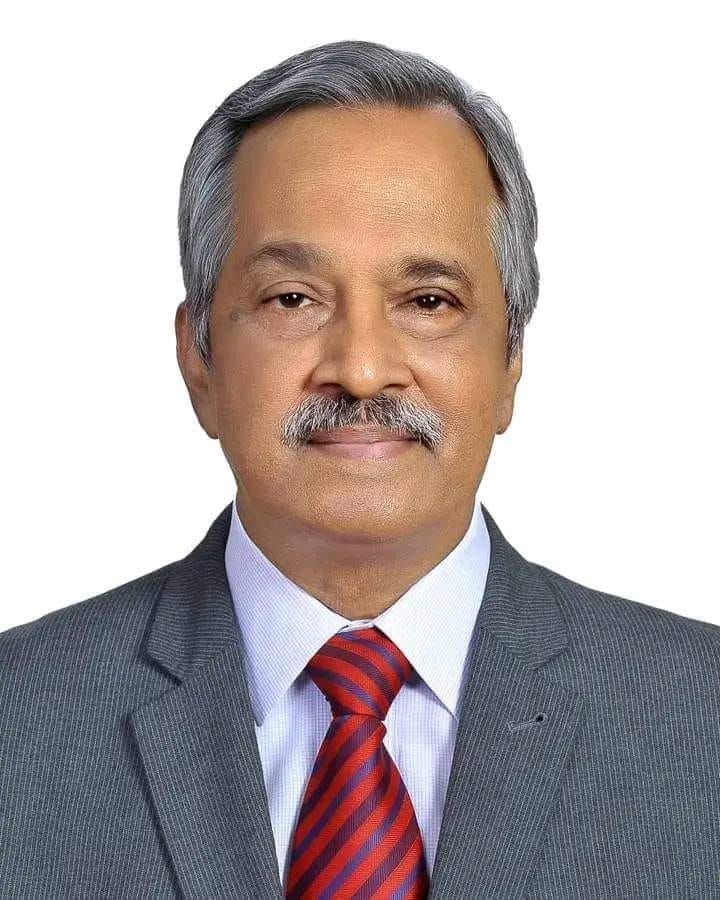

Member of the Bangladesh Parliament for Barisal-3
- Incumbent
- Assumed office 17 February 2026
- Constituency: Barisal-3

Chairman of the Parliamentary Standing Committee on the Ministry of Home Affairs
- Incumbent
- Assumed office 13 July 2026

Personal details
- Born: 27 July 1953 (age 73) Purba Hosenabad, Muladi, Barisal, East Bengal, Dominion of Pakistan
- Party: Bangladesh Nationalist Party (BNP)
- Children: 1 daughter
- Parents: Dalil Uddin (father); Amena Begum (mother)
- Education: University of Dhaka
- Occupation: Lawyer; politician
- Profession: Lawyer; politician
- Committees: Chairman, Standing Committee on Ministry of Home Affairs

Military service
- Branch/service: Mukti Bahini
- Battles/wars: Bangladesh Liberation War

Zainul Abedin
- জয়নুল আবেদীন
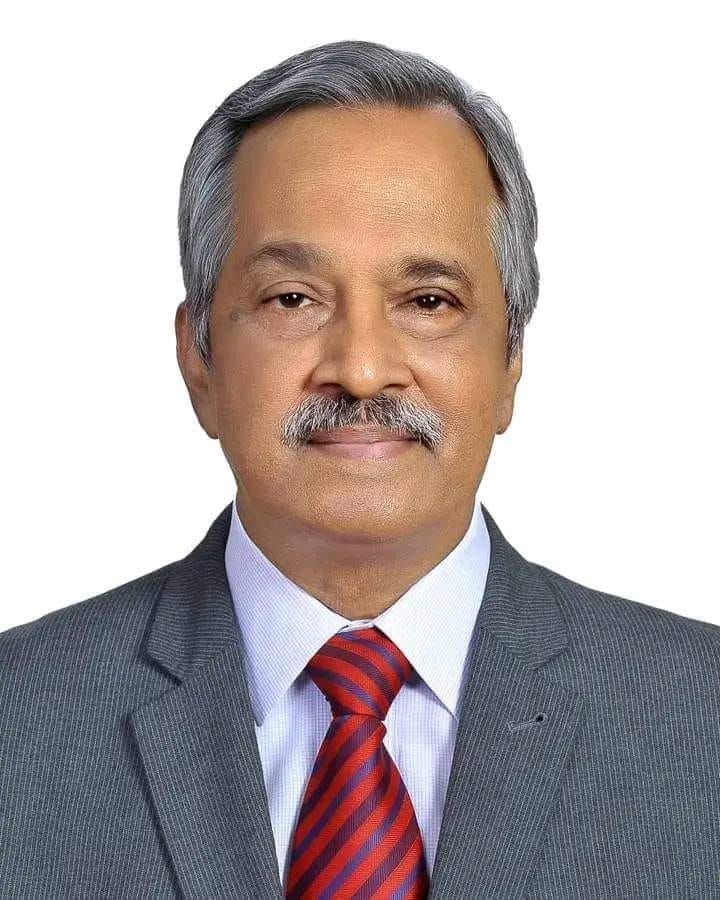

Member of the Bangladesh Parliament for Barisal-3
- Incumbent
- Assumed office 17 February 2026
- Preceded by: Golam Kibria Tipu

Personal details
- Born: July 27, 1953 (age 73)q Muladi Upazila, Barisal District
- Party: Bangladesh Nationalist Party

Zainul Abedin is a Bangladeshi politician of the Bangladesh Nationalist Party. He has served as a member of parliament from Barisal-3 since 2026.

== Early life ==
Awal was born on 27 August 1953 in Muladi Upazila in Barisal District.

- List of members of the 13th Jatiya Sangsad
