= 2015 Bangladeshi political crisis =

- Date: 5 January 2015 – 3 May 2015
- Location: Bangladesh
- Caused by: Unmet demands by the BNP stemming from the controversial 2014 Bangladeshi general election.
- Methods: Violent protests, petrol and crude bombs.

Parties
Awami League	Bangladesh Nationalist Party

Lead figures
Sheikh Hasina	Khaleda Zia

Casualties
- Deaths: Official account: 55 (as of 17 February 2015); Dhaka Tribune account: 75 (as of 20 February 2015); Unofficial account: >100
- Arrested: >10000

The 2015 Bangladeshi political crisis refers state of political turmoil between the two main political parties of Bangladesh, the Awami League (AL) led by incumbent prime minister Sheikh Hasina, and the Bangladesh Nationalist Party (BNP) in opposition, led by three time former prime minister Khaleda Zia. Following the controversial 2014 Bangladeshi general election, the BNP raised several demands for a second election under a neutral caretaker government. By 5 January 2015, the first anniversary of the election, their demands were not met and the BNP initiated countrywide protests and traffic blockades.

== Events ==
On 5 January 2015, Khaleda Zia urged members of the Bangladesh Nationalist Party to halt road, rail and river transport immediately. This marked the start of the countrywide blockade.

On 18 February 2015, a Dhaka court issued arrest warrants for 23 BNP leaders and activists, including Joint Secretary-General Amanullah Aman, and former president of the Jatiyatabadi Chhatra Dal, Sultan Salauddin Taku, for two arson cases. It was passed because the accused did not appear in the court during the hearing.

On 20 February 2015, the Sylhet–Dhaka intercity train, bound for Sylhet at the time, was firebombed when it was driving through the Habiganj District. No casualties were reported as the driver sped away to safety. Reports of attempts to cause derailments has also been reported.

On 25 February 2015, a special Judge Court in Bangladesh issued a warrant to arrest Khaleda Zia in two graft cases involving over US$650,000 after she had repeatedly failed to appear for the hearings. On 4 March 2015 the court upheld the arrest warrants issued against Zia, refusing request to withdraw the arrest warrant, filed by Zia's lawyer.

== Victims ==
A total of 75 victims has so far died as of 20 February 2015 in the country-wide blockade, of which 41 were victims of arson attacks.

- Idris (aged 18) and Titu Acharjee (aged 35), passengers of an auto-rickshaw, were attacked on 11 February 2015 with a petrol bomb at the Shah Mirpur area in Chittagong. Idris died in the afternoon at the Chittagong Medical College Hospital (CMCH), while Titu was still undergoing treatment. Titu was returning from his home village.
- Md Hossain (aged 50), a day labourer by occupation, died on 15 February 2015. He received burn injuries in the Lalpool area behind the Dhaka–Chittagong highway.
- Ali Hossain, a pick-up van driver (aged 45), and his helpers Mohammad Selim (aged 40) and Dulal Mia (aged 30) were critically burned on 16 February 2015 by petrol bombs at the Rangunia Upazila of Chittagong. They were admitted to the CMCH's burn unit.
- Sahabuddin, a CNG-run auto-rickshaw driver (aged 28) received injuries from splinters because some miscreants hurled crude bombs onto the road on 17 February 2015 in the Hathazari Upazila of Chittagong. He was admitted into the CMCH Casualty ward.
- Selina Akter, a teacher at the Mohammadpur Commercial School and College (aged 35) and Abdus Salam were injured by splinters from a handmade bomb on 17 February 2015 at Shahbagh in the capital Dhaka. The splinter hit Selina's left leg, and another splinter hit Abdus' forehead. Abdus was given first aid and headed home, while Selina was rushed by pedestrians to the DMCH where she was admitted.
- Chunnu Mia, a truck driver, and his helper Chayan both sustained burn injuries as petrol bombs were hurled at their running truck on 18 February 2015 in the Magura Sadar Upazila of Khulna. They were admitted to the Magura Sadar hospital according to the police. As of 19 February 2015, they were medically out of danger.
- Uzzal Hossain, truck driver (aged 32) and his helper Mamun Mia (aged 22) were burned as a petrol bomb was hurled at their truck in the Bhuapur Upazila of the Tangail district. They were taken to the Tangail Medical College Hospital and then later referred to the Dhaka Medical College and Hospital (DMCH).
- Subhash Shome (aged 65), Saber Ahmed (aged 25), Nur Mohammad (aged 30) and Md Nasir (aged 40) were burned and four more were injured, Rupam Debnath (aged 25), Md Arif (aged 30), Md Sohel (aged 25), and Md Mozammel Haque (aged 26). A petrol bomb was thrown at their bus in the Pologround area in Chittagong at midnight on 18 February 2015. They were admitted to the Chittagong Medical College Hospital (CMCH), but Subhash was later transferred to the DMCH as his condition worsened. The other four injured passengers were given first aid. The bus was travelling to the Chittagong New Market area when the petrol bomb was thrown. "The driver lost control after the attack and the vehicle ploughed into the central reservation", said Nayek Hamidur Rahman of the CMCH police outpost.
- Zahid Ahmed, another pick-up van driver, died in the DMCH after sustaining burn injuries from an arson attack on 20 February 2015. Two others, including Zahid, also received burns as more miscreants set a cargo truck alight with petrol bombs at the Palash Upazila of Narsingdi.

=== Aid ===
On 25 January 2015, the Bashundhara Group donated Tk 20,000 ($260 or €240, as of March 2015) to each of the families of the 46 burn victims at the DMCH, totalling to Tk 920,000 ($12,000 or €11,000).

A charity concert named the "Concert for the Burned" was held on 14 March as a fundraiser for burn victims in the DMCH; of which a significant proportion were injured or killed in arson or petrol bomb attacks. The concert is planned to be held at the National Library's auditorium with an entry fee of Tk 250 ($3.2 or €3.0) per person that will be directly given to the DMCH.

== Reaction ==
In a statement on 13 February 2015, the Spokesperson for the United Nations Secretary-General, Stéphane Dujarric, expressed concern over the Bangladeshi political crisis and called for a peaceful resolution.
