= Motahar Uddin =

Bangladeshi politician

Motahar Uddin Master
- মোতাহার উদ্দিন

Member of 1st Jatiya Sangsad
- In office 7 March 1973 – 10 January 1974
- Preceded by: Position established
- Succeeded by: M. M. Nazrul Islam
- Constituency: Bakerganj-3

Chairman, Lalmohan Union Council
- In office 1962

Personal details
- Born: Motahar Uddin Ahmed; 24 August 1935 Lalmohan, Bhola Island, Backergunge District, Bengal Presidency
- Died: 10 January 1974 (aged 38) Lalmohan, Bhola, Bangladesh
- Cause of death: Assassination
- Resting place: Gazaria, Lalmohan, Bhola
- Party: Awami League

Motahar Uddin Ahmed (Bengali: মোতাহার উদ্দিন আহমেদ; 24 August 1935 – 10 January 1974), popularly known as Motahar Uddin Master (Bengali: মোতাহার উদ্দিন মাস্টার) was a Bangladeshi teacher and Awami League politician. He was a member of parliament for Bakerganj-3.

== Early life and family ==
Motahar Uddin Ahmed was born on 24 August 1935 to a Bengali Muslim family in the Hawlader Bari of Gazaria (West Char Umed), Lalmohan in Bhola Island, then a part of the Backergunge District of the Bengal Presidency. His father, Moulvi Sultan Ahmad, was a madrasa teacher and his mother, Asiya Khatun, was a housewife. He was the eldest child of his parents and had six younger sisters. He married Mahmuda Begum and they had two sons and one daughter.

== Education ==
Motahar Uddin studied at the Chandpur Middle School in Tazumuddin and then at the Bhola Government High School up until 1950. He then enrolled at the Brojomohun College where he passed first class in his HSC in 1951. Uddin graduated with a Bachelor of Arts and Bachelor of Education from the University of Dacca.

== Career ==
Uddin was the headteacher of Gazaria School. He was elected to the East Pakistan Provincial Assembly following the 1970 Pakistani provincial elections and took part in the Bangladesh Liberation War. During the war, he was the founding president of the Char Fasson Sangram Committee and the founding vice-president of the Lalmohan Sangram Committee.

Following independence, he was elected to the first Jatiya Sangsad from Bakerganj-3 as an Awami League candidate at the 1973 Bangladeshi general election. He founded Surjamoni New Model Secondary School.

== Death ==
Motahar Uddin was assassinated by a family member on 10 January 1974 in Lalmohan.
