= Feroz Ahammed Shapon =

Bangladeshi politician

Member of Parliament for Satkhira-1
- In office 10 February 2024 – 6 August 2024
- Preceded by: Mustafa Lutfullah

Personal details
- Born: 21 October 1961 (age 64) Kalaroa, Satkhira, East Pakistan, Pakistan
- Party: Bangladesh Awami League
- Education: Jagannath University
- Occupation: Politician, businessman

Feroz Ahammed Shapon (born 21 October 1961) is a Bangladeshi politician and a former Jatiya Sangsad member representing the Satkhira-1 constituency.

== Early life ==
Firoze Ahmed Swapan was born on 21 October 1961 in Kalaroa Upazila of Satkhira district.

== Political career ==
Firoz Ahmed Swapon is the former chairman of Keralkatha Union in Kalaroa Upazila. He was also the former president of the Bangladesh Chhatra League unit at Kalaroa Government College, and the founding president of the Kalaroa Upazila Chhatra League. Additionally, he served as the former organizational secretary and former convener of the Awami League in Kalaroa Upazila. He was also the former chairman of the Kalaroa Upazila Parishad and president of the Kalaroa Upazila Awami League.

In the 2019 upazila election, he was defeated by independent candidate Aminul Islam Laltu.

He was elected as a Member of Parliament from the Satkhira-1 constituency as the nominated candidate of the Awami League in the 12th national parliamentary election, held on 7 January 2024. He served as a member of the Standing Committee on the Ministry of Shipping.

On 5 August 2024, amid the Non-cooperation movement, then-Prime Minister Sheikh Hasina resigned and fled to India. The following day, on 6 August, the President dissolved the Parliament, resulting in Firoz Ahmed Swapon losing his position as a Member of Parliament.
