= Sonabaria Union =

Sonabaria Union সোনাবাড়িয়া ইউনিয়ন
- Union
- Sonabaria Union
- Country: Bangladesh
- Division: Khulna
- District: Satkhira
- Upazila: Kalaroa
- Time zone: UTC+6 (BST)
- Website: sonabariaup.satkhira.gov.bd

Sonabaria (Bengali: সোনাবাড়িয়া) is a union parishad under Kalaroa Upazila, Satkhira District, in the Division of Khulna, southwest part of Bangladesh.
