= SM Mujibur Rahman =

Bangladeshi politician

Sheikh Mujibur Rahman

Member of Bangladesh Parliament Satkhira-1
- In office 2008–2013
- Preceded by: Habibul Islam Habib
- Succeeded by: Mustafa Lutfullah

Personal details
- Party: Bangladesh Awami League

Sheikh Mujibur Rahman is a Bangladesh Awami League politician and a former Member of Parliament of Satkhira-1.

== Career ==
Rahman was elected to parliament from Satkhira-1 as a Bangladesh Awami League candidate in 2008.

Rahman was arrested on 3 June 2026 from Uttara and was shown arrested in a case related to a death of a protestor in protests against former Prime Minister Sheikh Hasina.
