= Mohammad Abdul Barek =

Bangladeshi politician

Member of Bangladesh Parliament

Personal details
- Party: Jatiya Party (Ershad)

Mohammad Abdul Barek is a Jatiya Party (Ershad) politician and a former member of parliament for Barisal-3.

== Career ==
Barek was elected to parliament from Barisal-3 as a Jatiya Party candidate in 1986 and 1988.
