= Mansoor Ali Tipu =

Indian social worker

Sahebzada Syed Mansoor Ali Tipu is a social worker and the national president of Tehrik-e-Khudadaad. Belonging to the family of the Tipu Sultan, former ruler of Mysore, he is a seventh generation descendant of Tipu Sultan. As a researcher, major part of his work is to keep the family legacy alive and provide factual information about the family history and Tipu Sultan. Mansoor regularly participates in political debates concerning Tipu's image and work for the welfare of various communities. He also works for the communal and regional peace in the southern and western part of India in the states of Karnataka, Tamil Nadu, Maharashtra and Kerala. Syed Mansoor became a political figure when he demanded reservation for Muslim and Marathas, joining Sambha Ji Forces

== Family history ==
Sahebzada Mansoor is married to Sahebzadi Raheemunnissa who is the seventh generation descendant of Tipu Sultan. She is the daughter of Prince Rais Ahmed Shah. Mansoor's mother follows the lineage of father of Tipu Sultan's - Haider Ali's mother. And his father is the grandson of Syed Mohammed Bahadur who also helped the Indian National Congress in initial years.

He has also narrated for the upcoming documentary Shaheed Tipu sultan, directed by Shadab Siddiqui. Mansoor demanded the government to celebrate Tipu Jayanti as a government program in 2007 like that of other freedom fighters and finally got approval in 2015 during the reign of Chief Minister Sidramaiya and Minister for Minority Welfare - Wakf Qamarul Islam. He has now demanded for a research center and a Tipu Bhawan.

== Controversy ==
There was a controversy over the celebration of Tipu Sultan's birth anniversary where Anant Kumar Hegde of the BJP called Tipu Sultan a mass rapist and a wretched fanatic, Mansoor demanded an unconditional apology for this and filed a defamation case in Calcutta High Court.
