= Joynagar Union, Satkhira =

Joynagar Union জয়নগর ইউনিয়ন
- Union
- Joynagar Union
- Location within Bangladesh
- Coordinates: 22.8812°N 89.1166°E
- Country: Bangladesh
- Division: Khulna
- District: Satkhira
- Upazila: Kalaroa
- Time zone: UTC+6 (BST)
- Website: joynagarup.satkhira.gov.bd

Joynagar (Bengali: জয়নগর) is a union parishad under Kalaroa Upazila, Satkhira District, in the Division of Khulna, southwest part of Bangladesh.
