= Shafiq Ullah (politician) =

Bangladeshi politician

Member of Bangladesh Parliament
- In office 18 February 1979 – 12 February 1982

President of Bangladesh Sramik Kalyan Federation
- In office 1987–1989
- Preceded by: Mohammad Nurul Haque
- Succeeded by: Ansar Ali

Personal details
- Party: Bangladesh Jamaat-e-Islami; Islamic Democratic League

Shafiq Ullah (Bengali: শফিক উল্লাহ) was a Bangladesh Jamaat e Islami politician and a former member of parliament for Noakhali-12.

== Career ==
Ullah was elected to parliament from Noakhali-12 as an Islamic Democratic League candidate in 1979.
