= Kalaroa Municipality =

Coordinates: 22.8620°N 89.0405°E

Kalroa Municipality is a class 'B' municipality in Kalaroa Upazila of Khulna Division Satkhira District, Bangladesh. It is mainly responsible for maintenance and given citizen service of Kalaroa town

== History ==
In December 2015, Bangladesh Election Commission suspended the returning officer of municipal election over irregularities.

Kalaroa Municipality elected its first trans woman councilor in January 2021.

Rapid Action Battalion arrested Ripon Hossain, a resident of the municipality, for the 2002 attack on Sheikh Hasina's convoy in May 2023.
