= A. K. A. Firoze Noon =

Bangladeshi politician (1946–2006)

- এ কে এ ফিরোজ নূন
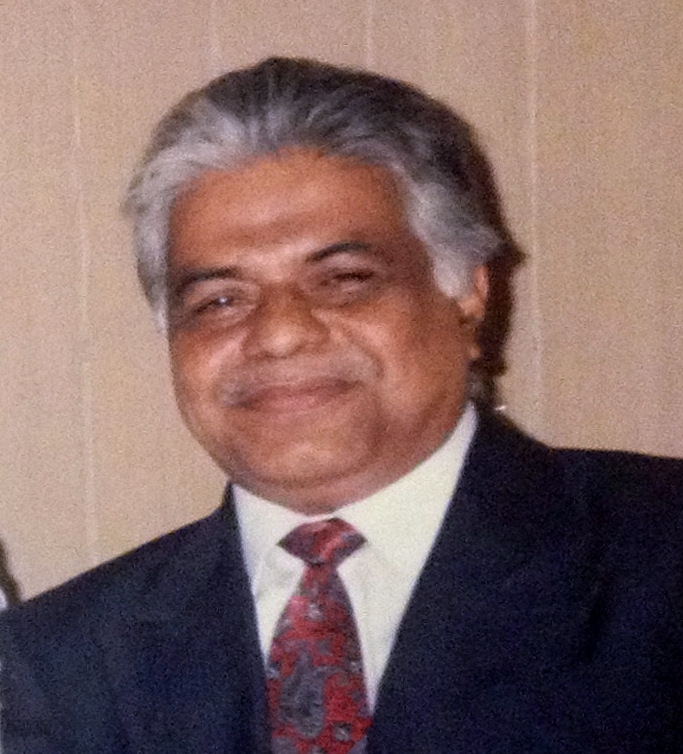

Personal details
- Born: 4 January 1946 Sreenagar, Munshiganj, Dacca district, Bengal
- Died: 23 December 2006 (aged 60) Singapore
- Party: Bangladesh Nationalist Party
- Education: Saint Joseph's High School, Khulna; Brajalal College; University of Dacca
- Occupation: Politician, journalist, author

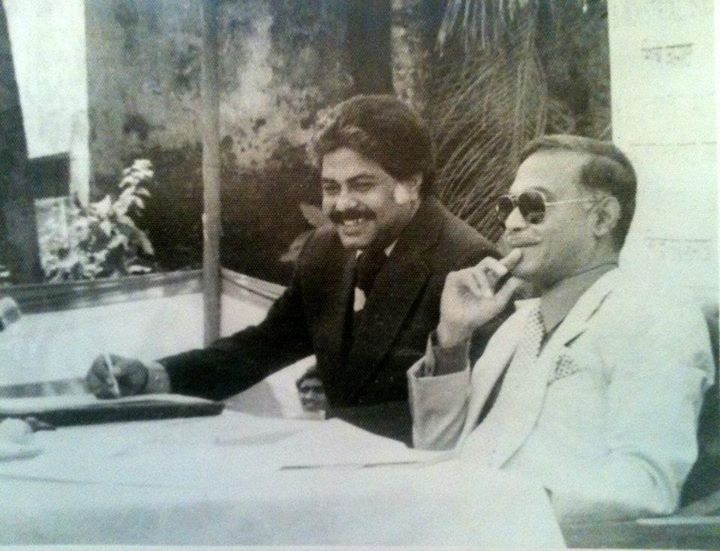
A. K. A. Firoze Noon with President Ziaur Rahman (1979)

A. K. A. Firoze Noon (4 January 1946 – 23 December 2006) was a Bangladeshi politician and one of the founding members of the Bangladesh Nationalist Party (BNP). He was also a founding professor of the BNP's political training centre and the party's former political and economic research editor. During the First Khaleda ministry, he served as a political adviser to Prime Minister Khaleda Zia.

== Early life and education ==
Noon was born on 4 January 1946 to a Muslim family in the village of Shamspur in Munshiganj, then part of the Dacca district of Bengal. His father, Mozammel Hossain Suba Miah, was a former chairman of the Kolapara Union Council. His mother, Sufula Begum Chapa, was the granddaughter of Khan Bahadur Munshi Khabirullah CIE of Munshiganj.

Noon studied at the Shamspur School and Saint Joseph's High School, Khulna. He completed his matriculation in 1963 from Khulna Government Model High School. He graduated from Brajalal College, Khulna with a Bachelor of Arts in 1967. In 1968, Noon obtained his Master of Arts in Bengali language and took admission in the Bachelor of Laws degree program at the University of Dacca.

== Political career ==
During his college days, East Pakistan was seized by a terrible commotion over the highly controversial Hamoodur Rahman Educational Commission Report. Students in East Pakistan rose in protest and demanded to scrap the report which would have gone against the interest of the students if implemented. Noon was the Convenor of the Committee of the college students and was eventually involved in its leadership. This was the time he joined the Chhatra League, student wing of the East Pakistan Awami League, serving as its vice president from 1966 to 1967. Being in the front ranking leader of the students, he was put behind the bars for some time in 1963. Noon participated in Six Point movement and 11-point program of the students – the main opposition political party student's movement respectively at that time.

Noon rose to the position of vice-president of the Chhatra League. The mass uprising in 1969 was about to precipitate – at least the distant signal was beckoning. The student community in Khulna, like in other places of the province, started the process of effacing the names of Pakistani leaders after whom the public structures, roads, and thoroughfares had been known. In the first place, the Jinnah Park in Khulna was renamed Shahid Hadi's Park after a martyr in the political movements. Noon proposed the change in public and the renaming was ceremonially performed. It was again he and Professor Rashid who jointly laid the first brick to build a Shaheed Minar in Khulna town.

The years between 1970 and 1976 kept Noon busy with his vocational chores mostly and in the backyard he allowed his political thinking and attachment take to a newer trend. In 1977 he joined hands with General Ziaur Rahman in his bid to float the new Bangladesh Nationalist Party(BNP). After the formation of BNP, President Ziaur Rahman took initiative for formation of political institutes and sponsored workshops for the youth to get active political lessons on Bangladeshi nationalism. Noon assumed the role of the Principal for the Political Training Centre and in the process about 7,000 political activists including the Members of Parliament and government ministers were imparted training.

Noon got himself involved in a number of areas related to the party progression. As a founding member of BNP in Zia's time, he was Secretary of Political & Economic Research Centre. He traveled to China, Saudi Arabia, Yugoslavia and other countries alongside President Ziaur Rahman as the member of a high-level delegation team and also as a distinguished member, Envoy's Pool of the Ministry of Foreign Affairs.

In the 1991 Bangladeshi general election, Noon acted as the Chief Election Coordinator of BNP and contributed to the BNP Election Manifestos.

== Publications ==
Noon was the author of five books on the life and work of President Ziaur Rahman. Publications include:

- Amar Rajneetir Rooprekha (1986)
- Zia Keno Jonopriyo (1991)
- Chhotoder Jonno Ziaur Rahman (1991)
- Chhotoder Komol Jonotar Zia (2002)
- Shoheed Ziar Srestho Boktrita (2002)

== Journalism and cultural contributions ==
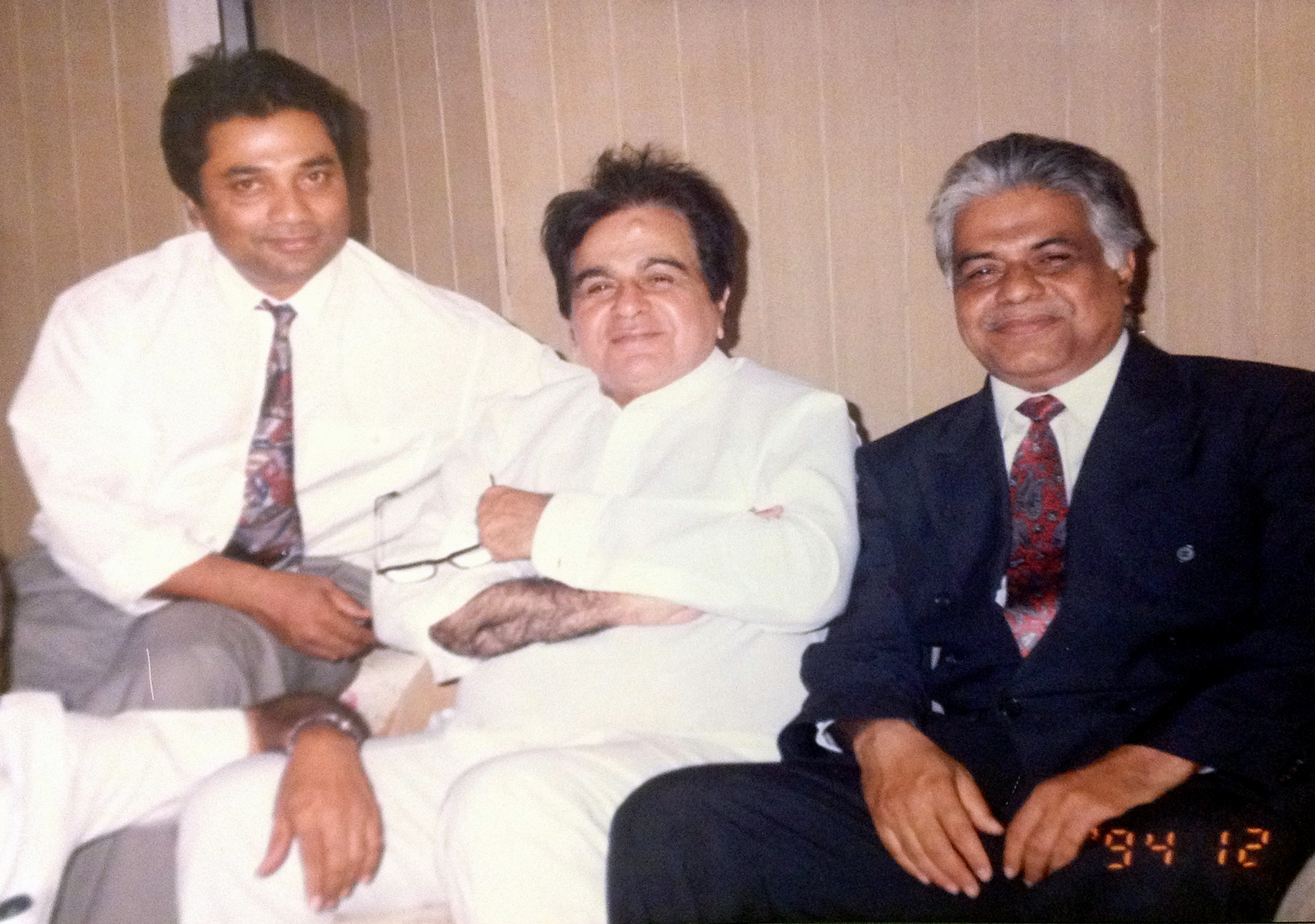
Noon with Annisul Huq at the home of actor Dilip Kumar in Bombay, India.

Noon was associated with The Daily Ittefaq as a reporter from 1963 to 1964 and as General Manager of The Daily Desh from 1982 to 1990. Besides, he has regularly contributed to the post-editorial columns of many dailies in Bangladesh. He was a television personality who hosted a talk show on Bangladesh Television (BTV), as well as its National Debate Competition. He was a regular guest speaker on 'Tritiyo Matra' on Channel i and was also a regular guest speaker on NTV, ATN Bangla, RTV and other channels.

Noon received Atish Dipankar Gold Medal Award for the merit of performance and contribution in the socio-cultural arena.
