= Golam Kibria Tipu =

Bangladeshi politician

- গোলাম কিবরিয়া টিপু

Member of the Bangladesh Parliament for Barisal-3
- In office 30 January 2019 – 6 August 2024
- Preceded by: Tipu Sultan
- In office 25 January 2009 – 24 January 2014
- Preceded by: Mosharraf Hossain Mongu

Personal details
- Party: Jatiya Party (Ershad)

Golam Kibria Tipu is a Jatiya Party (Ershad) politician and a former Jatiya Sangsad member representing the Barisal-3 constituency.

== Early life ==
Tipu was born on 2 September 1953. He completed his undergraduate in science.

== Career ==
Tipu was elected to parliament from Barisal-3 as a Jatiya Party (Ershad) candidate 30 December 2018.

After the fall of the Sheikh Hasina-led Awami League government, Tipu was detained in Keraniganj in November 2024.
