= Amal Sen =

Bangladeshi communist and anti-colonial activist (1914 – 2003)

- অমল সেন
- Photo of Comrade Amal Sen
- Born: 19 July 1914; Narail District, Bengal Presidency, British Raj
- Died: 17 January 2003 (aged 88); Dhaka, Bangladesh
- Citizenship: British subject (until 1947); Pakistan (1947–1971); Bangladesh (from 1971)
- Education: Brajalal College
- Political party: Workers Party of Bangladesh
- Other political affiliations: Communist Party of India; Communist Party of Bangladesh (Marxist–Leninist); Bangladesh Communist Party (Leninist)
- Movement: Tebhaga movement Independence of Bangladesh; Bangladesh Liberation War

Amal Sen (Bengali: অমল সেন; 19 July 1914 – 17 January 2003) was a Bangladeshi politician. He was the founding president of the Workers Party of Bangladesh.

== Early life and education ==
Sen was born in Afra village, Narail on 19 July 1914. His family were zamindars. The ancestral home of his family was located at Bakri village, Bagherpara Upazila, Jessore District. Sen graduated in chemistry from Brajalal College in Khulna.

== Career ==
In 1933, after having graduated from college, he became a member of the Communist Party of India. He took part in the struggle against British rule over India. Sen was the leader of Tebhaga movement in Narail.

Sen became a leader of the East Pakistan Communist Party (Marxist–Leninist). Sen led a split from the EPCP(M–L) in 1971. Sen was a resistance organizer during the Bangladesh Liberation War. The EPCP(M–L) led by Sen and Nazrul Islam was one of the groups participating in the Coordination Committee of the Bangladesh Liberation Struggle set up in Calcutta. The Sen-Nazrul Islam faction set up the Bangladesh Communist Solidarity Committee. In 1972 he became the general secretary of the Bangladesh Communist Party (Leninist), a new open party into which the Amal Sen-Nazrul Islam-led EPCP(M–L) had merged. He became the general secretary of the United Communist League in 1986. Between 1992 and 2000 he served as president of the re-united Workers Party of Bangladesh, after 2000 he remained a member of the Central Committee of the party.

== Death and legacy ==
Sen spent a total of 19 years in prison, linked to his political activism. Sen died at Dhaka Community Hospital on 17 January 2003.

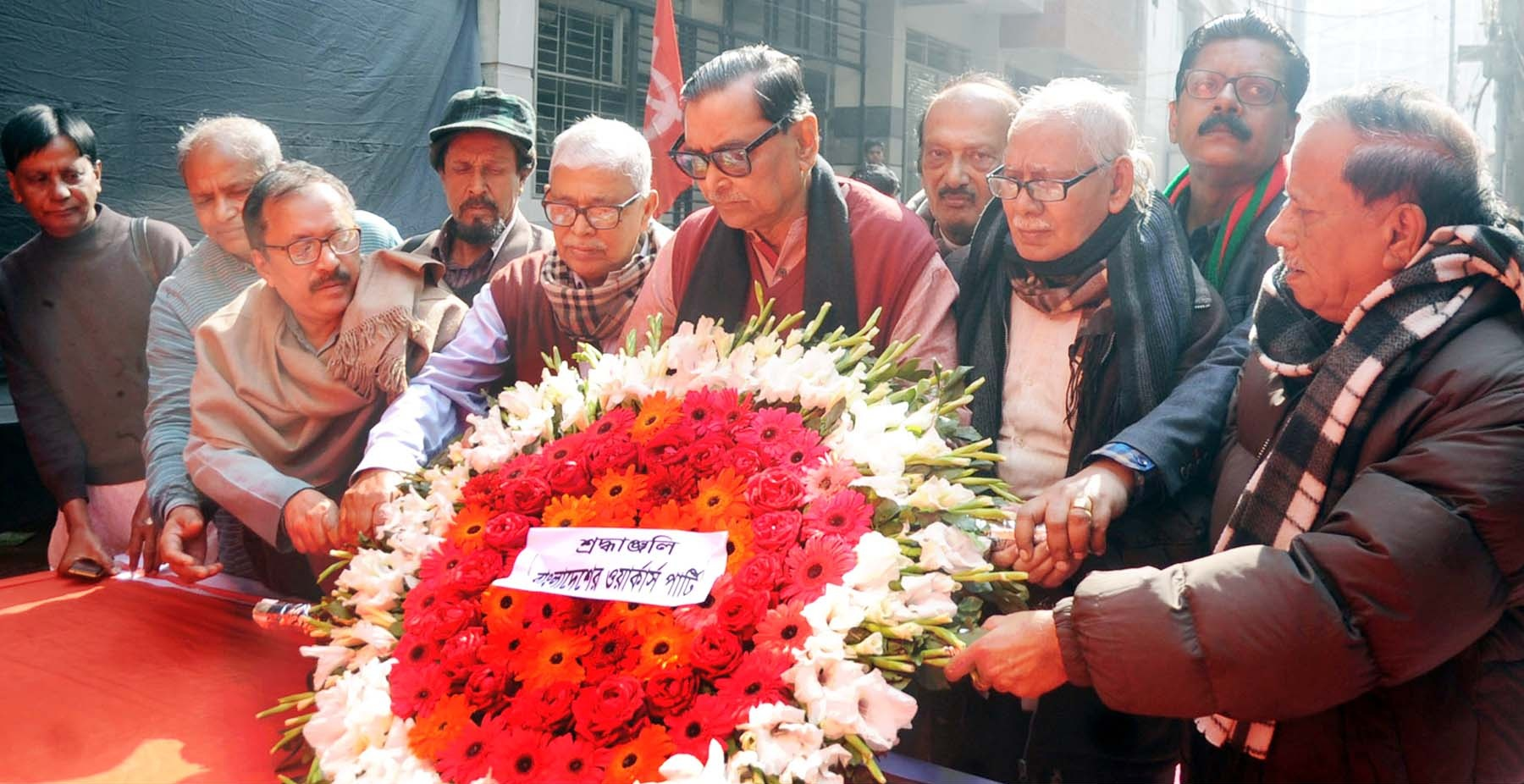
Rashed Khan Menon pays homage to portrait of Comrade Amal Sen in Dhaka on 16 January 2018
