= Tippu =

Tippu may refer to:

- Tippu Sultan, Indian ruler
- Tippu (singer) (born 1978), South Indian film playback singer

== See also ==
- Tipu (disambiguation)
