= Mustafa Lutfullah =

Bangladeshi politician (born 1961)

- মুস্তফা লুৎফুল্লাহ

Member of Bangladesh Bangladesh Parliament
- In office 2014–2024
- Preceded by: SM Mujibur Rahman
- Constituency: Satkhira-1

Personal details
- Born: 15 December 1961 (age 64) Satkhira
- Party: Workers Party of Bangladesh

Mustafa Lutfullah (born 15 December 1961), is a Bangladeshi politician. He is former member of parliament representing Satkhira-1 for the Workers Party of Bangladesh

== Background ==
Lutfullah is a lawyer by profession. He is also a politician.
