= Kalaroa =

Kalaroa কলারোয়া
- Town & Municipality
- Location within Khulna division Location within Bangladesh
- Coordinates: 22°51′30″N 89°02′18″E
- Country: Bangladesh
- Division: Khulna
- District: Satkhira
- Upazila: Kalaroa
- Established: 1854 (172 years ago)
- Municipality: 11 March 1990 (36 years ago)

Government
  - Type: Mayor-Council
  - Body: Kalaroa Municipality
  - Mayor: Vacant

Area
  - Total: 15.07 km^{2} (5.82 sq mi)
- Elevation: 6 m (20 ft)

Population (2022)
  - Total: 31,436
  - Density: 2,086/km^{2} (5,403/sq mi)
- Demonym: Kalaroari
- Time zone: UTC+6 (BST)
- Postal Code: 9410
- Languages: Standard Bengali (Official)
- Police: Bangladesh Police
- Literacy rate: 57.6%
- Website: municipality.kalaroa.satkhira.gov.bd

Kalaroa is an upazila town in Satkhira district. It is the headquarters of Kalaroa upazila. It lies on the bank of Betna River . The town is under justification of Kalaroa thana. It located 18 km North of Satkhira, and about 64 km south west of Khulna. It is one of major town in Satkhira district.

== Notable people ==
- Md. Habibur Rahman
