= Ansar Ali =

Bangladeshi politician

Member of Parliament for Satkhira-1
- In office 5 March 1991 – 24 November 1995
- Preceded by: Syed Didar Bakht
- Succeeded by: Syed Kamal Bakht

President of Bangladesh Sramik Kalyan Federation
- In office 1990–2001
- Preceded by: Shafiq Ullah
- Succeeded by: Mujibur Rahman

Personal details
- Died: 6 October 2020 (aged 78) Dhaka, Bangladesh
- Party: Bangladesh Jamaat-e-Islami

Ansar Ali (died 6 October 2020) was a Bangladesh Jamaat-e-Islami politician and a Jatiya Sangsad member representing the Satkhira-1 constituency.

== Career ==
Ali was elected to parliament from Satkhira-1 as a Bangladesh Jamaat-e-Islami candidate in 1991.
