= Syed Didar Bakht =

Bangladeshi politician

- সৈয়দ দীদার বখত

Member of 4th Jatiya Sangsad
- In office 1988–1991
- Preceded by: Syed Kamal Bakht
- Succeeded by: Ansar Ali
- Constituency: Satkhira-1

Personal details
- Born: Tetulia, Satkhira, Khulna District
- Party: Jatiya Party (Ershad)
- Relatives: Syed Kamel Bakht (brother); Syed Kamal Bakht

Syed Didar Bakht is a Jatiya Party (Ershad) politician in Bangladesh and a former member of parliament for Satkhira-1.

== Early life and family ==
Bakht was born into a renowned Bengali family of Muslim Syeds also known as the Hashimi family in the village of Tetulia in Tala, Satkhira, Khulna District. His father was Syed Sharfuddin Hashmey and he was the brother of Syed Kamel Bakht and a relative of Syed Kamal Bakht.

== Career ==
Bakht was elected to parliament from Satkhira-1 as a Jatiya Party candidate in 1988. He served as a state minister in the cabinet of President Hussain Mohammad Ershad. He joined the Bangladesh Nationalist Party in 2000. He left the BNP, after failing to get their nomination, and joined the Liberal Democratic Party. He returned to the Jatiya Party and was appointed presidium member.
