= Tipu Jayanti =

Birthday of Tipu Sultan of Mysore

Tipu Jayanti is the celebration of the birth anniversary on 20 November of Tipu Sultan, who ruled the Kingdom of Mysore.

In 2015, Karnataka CM Siddaramaiah, from Indian National Congress started Hazrat Tipu Sultan Jayanti as an annual government event. It faced protests from the Hindu nationalist Bharatiya Janta Party whenever it was held. In 2019, when the BJP government came to govern the state, they scrapped this event.

In 2025, MP Vijayanand Kashappanavar raised the demand to resume Tipu Jayanti.
