= Salarama =

Town of ancient Lycaonia

Coordinates: 38°00′30″N 32°48′38″E

Salarama was a town of ancient Lycaonia, inhabited in Roman and Byzantine times.

Its site is located near Zincirli Han, Asiatic Turkey.
