= Syed Kamel Bakht =

Bangladeshi nationalist and guerrilla leader

Syed Kamel Bakht was a communist who formed his own guerrilla force in Satkhira in southwest Bangladesh. He fought against the Pakistan Army during the Bangladesh War of Liberation.

Syed Kamel Bakht died at the age of 17 during the war in the month of November by a group of Mujib Bahini personnel. His elder brother Syed Didar Bakth later became the Minister of Information and Cultural Affairs of Bangladesh.

== Early life ==
Syed Kamel Bakht was born in 1954 at Tentulia village of Tala Upazila which is now under Satkhira District of present Bangladesh. He was the youngest of all the sons of his father Syed Sharfuddin Hashemy.

He completed his primary education in a local school. After passing the matriculation examination he joined Khulna BL College before the war broke out in 1971.

== Political affiliation ==
Syed Kamel Bakht was influenced by his elder brother Syed Deedar Bakht who was a leader of Coordination Committee of Communist Revolutionaries of East Bengal. He also joined the group before the Liberation War of Bangladesh and soon became an organizer with his talent.

When the war broke out in the then East Pakistan, now Bangladesh, Coordination Committee of Communist Revolutionaries of East Bengal was converted into the Bangladesh National Liberation Struggle Coordination Committee.

== Role in Liberation War ==
Syed Kamel Bakht, along with his brother Syed Deedar Bakht formed their own guerrilla force with the members of their party and the local youths in early May 1971. Their force was known as “Gana Mukti Bahini” (People's Liberation Force).

In the middle of June, his force captured the Tala Upazila police station on their own and collected the arms and ammunition. They had raised the flag of independent Bangladesh in the compound of the police station and declared the area as liberated.

Later on, with the help of the freedom fighters of Bangladesh Force, he led an attack on the Kapilmuni police station in the next month.

He had led a series of battle against the Pakistan Army on the bank of Salta River, Patkelghata, and Sagardari areas.

Syed Kamel Bakht gained enormous success in the battles forcing the Pakistan Army to retreat. Soon after liberating the areas he established an administration which was led by communist ideology.

He accumulated many lands from the local landlords and distributed those among the peasants. He also took an attempt to introduce new systems regarding land ownership, in other words land-reform or agrarian reforms.

He was determined to punish the collaborators, Razakars as well. His followers used to slaughter the prominent Razakars of the liberated areas and hang their bodies in trees.

== Death ==
In August, a section of Mujib Bahini men entered into his area and befriended with the brothers. They used to live with them in their den. But after some days they went back to India. In mid October, they came back with more people with them.

In November, Syed Kamel Bakht left for Kolkata to meet his party men and held meetings with central leader of his party Haider Akbar Khan Rano. He described his struggle during the war and had asked the central leadership to visit his area. The leadership was keen to visit his area and planned to go there soon.

When he returned from Kolkata to his area, he was killed with his henchman Shankar in his own den by Mujib Bahini men. They shot them from a very close distance with automatic rifles and ensured their death.

His brother, Syed Deedar Bakht survived the attack as he was not his brother that night. But the Mujib Bahini men launched a fresh drive to hunt him down. This hunt continued even after the liberation war.
