= Mosharraf Hossain Mongu =

Bangladeshi politician

Member of Bangladesh Parliament

Personal details
- Political party: Bangladesh Nationalist Party

Mosharraf Hossain Mongu is a Bangladesh Nationalist Party politician and a former member of parliament for Barisal-3.

== Career ==
Mongu was elected to parliament from Barisal-3 as a Bangladesh Nationalist Party candidate in 1991, 1996, and 2001. He was sued in 2006 for misappropriation of funds.
