= S. M. Babar Ali =

Bangladeshi politician

SM Babar Ali

Member of Bangladesh Parliament
- In office 1973–1976

Personal details
- Party: Awami League

SM Babar Ali (Bengali: স ম বাবর আলী) is a Awami League politician in Bangladesh and a former member of parliament for Khulna-9.

== Career ==
Ali was elected to parliament from Khulna-9 as an Awami League candidate in 1973.
