= 2014 Bangladeshi general election =

- 5 January 2014

300 of the 350 seats in the Jatiya Sangsad 151 seats needed for a majority
- Registered: 43,943,184
- Turnout: 39.58% (▼47.55pp)
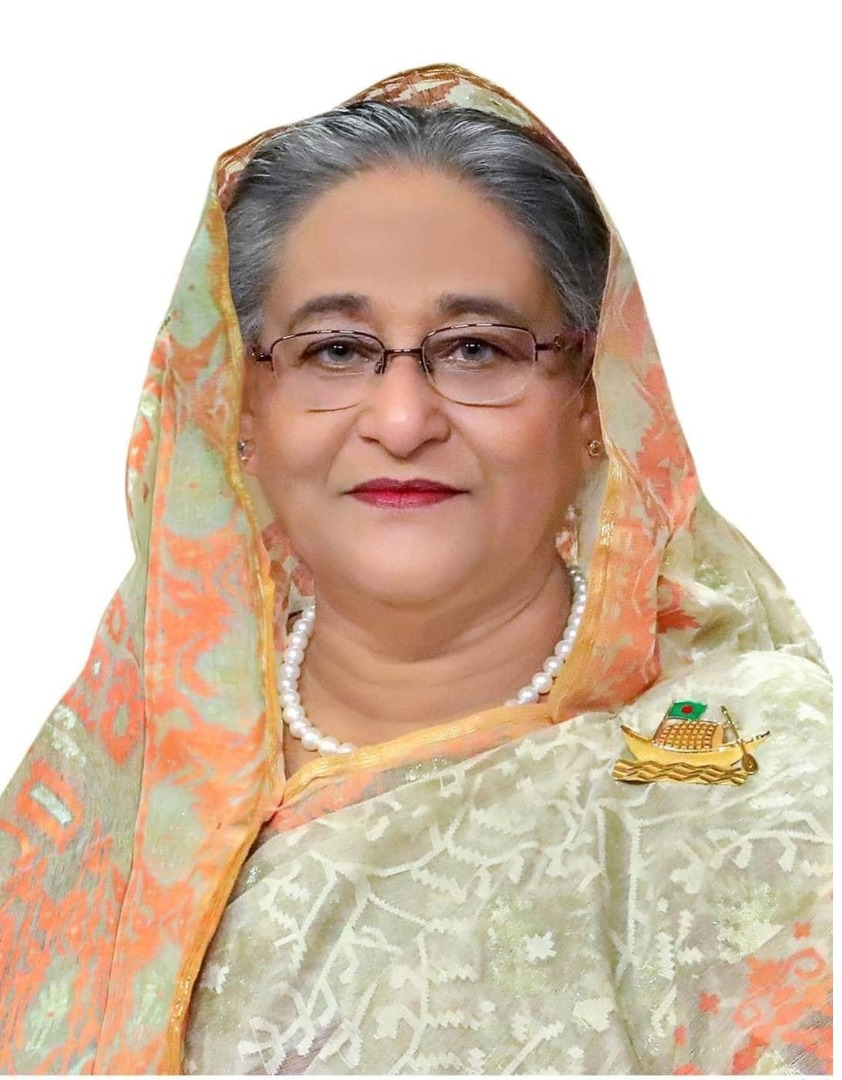

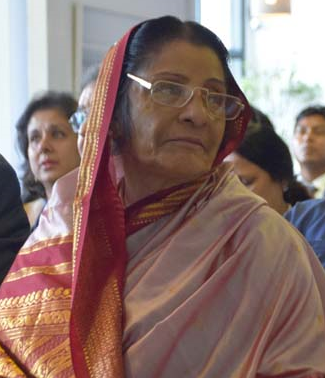
	First party	Second party
Leader	Sheikh Hasina	Rowshan Ershad
Party	AL	JP(E)
Last election	48.04%, 230 seats	7.04%, 27 seats
Seats won	234	34
Seat change	▲4	▲7
Popular vote	12,357,374	1,199,727
Percentage	72.14%	7.00%
Swing	▲24.10pp	▼0.04pp
- Results by constituency
Prime minister before election
Sheikh Hasina
AL
Prime Minister after election
Sheikh Hasina
AL

General elections were held in Bangladesh on 5 January 2014, in accordance with the constitutional requirement that elections must take place within the 90-day period before the expiration of the term of the Jatiya Sangshad on 24 January 2014.

The elections were not free and fair. They were preceded by a government crackdown on the opposition, with Bangladesh Nationalist Party and opposition leader Khaleda Zia put under house arrest. There were widespread arrests of other opposition members, violence and strikes by the opposition, attacks on religious minorities, and extrajudicial killings by the government, with around 21 people killed on election day. Almost all major opposition parties boycotted the elections, resulting in 153 of the 300 directly elected seats being uncontested and the incumbent Awami League-led Grand Alliance of Prime Minister Sheikh Hasina winning a landslide majority. Hasina became the first prime minister in the history of Bangladesh to be re-elected to serve a second term.

The elections were criticized by the United States, United Kingdom, European Union and the United Nations. 176 global leaders including U.S. President Barack Obama, Hillary Clinton and Joseph Stiglitz, issued a letter that claimed the election "lacked legitimacy".

== Background ==
During 2013 the Bangladesh Nationalist Party and its alliance of 18 opposition parties led by former prime minister and Opposition Leader Khaleda Zia called more than 85 days of nationwide general strikes and blockades that brought the entire country to a grinding halt. The opposition demanded that the ruling Awami League party led by the current prime minister Sheikh Hasina amend the constitution, dissolve the parliament after their full five-year term ended on 24 January 2014, and then hand over power to a non-partisan interim government or a caretaker government that would be run by technocrats for 90 days. The job of a Caretaker Government of Bangladesh would then be to work in tandem with the Bangladesh Election Commission by helping them to organise, arrange, and oversee the general election held on 5 January and transfer power to a newly elected government. As most of the demands were not met within the stipulated time frame, all opposition parties boycotted the polls. Hasina had offered an all party interim election cabinet government which would include opposition parties till the election but this was rejected by Zia.

== Date ==
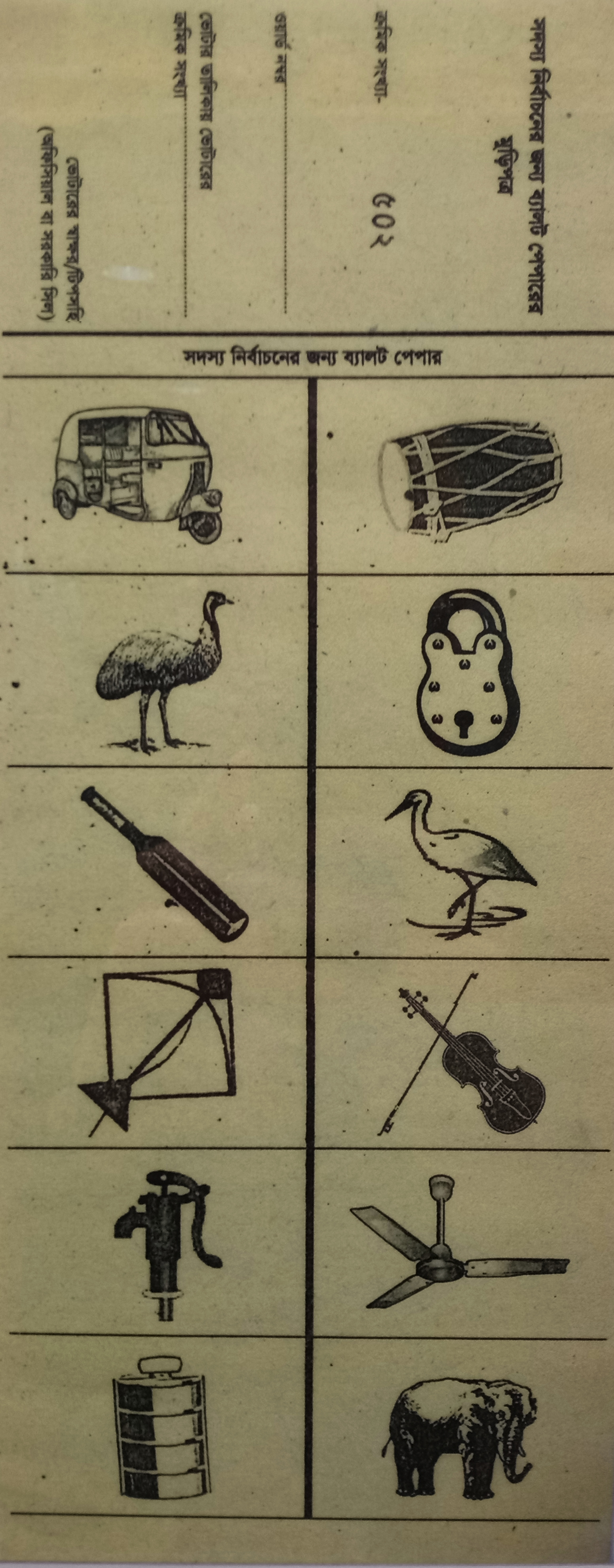
Ballot paper from 2014 election

As the ninth parliament's mandate expired on 24 January 2014, article 123(2)(a) of the constitution required a general election to be held between 26 October 2013 and 24 January 2014, within 90 days before the expiration of the term of the Jatiya Sangshad. On 25 November 2013, the Bangladesh Election Commission announced that the 10th general election would be held on 5 January 2014.

== Boycott ==
Following months of protests, strikes and blockades, the 18-party opposition alliance led by the Bangladesh Nationalist Party formally announced a boycott of the election citing unfair conditions for the election. On 3 December 2013, Jatiya Party, led by former president Hussain Mohammad Ershad, also announced its intention to boycott the election. European Union representatives met BNP leader Khaleda Zia and asked her not to boycott the election and to stop the strikes and shutdowns and instead resort to dialogue with the government. In a video message, Tarique Rahman, the senior vice-chairman of the BNP called for a boycott of the election saying that "the time has come for all of us to prevent and boycott the 5 January polls. Not for personal interest but for the sake of the country's existence". The opposition had also called for the government to resign so an interim non-partisan administration could lead the country through the election period.

== Protests and violence ==
On the night of 4 December 2013, Jatiya Party leader H. M. Ershad threatened to kill himself after security forces besieged his home following his decision to boycott the election. On 13 December, he was confined to a military hospital following his arrest from his Baridhara residence by security forces. According to the RAB commander, Ershad had been taken there at his own request. Zia was also put under house arrest since 29 December at her Gulshan residence. The Bangladesh Army was deployed throughout the country on 26 December on the request of the election commission to maintain law and order. The army would stay on the streets until 9 January 2014.

On 13 December Jamaat-e-Islami's Abdul Quader Mollah became the first person to be executed for war crimes relation to the Bangladesh Independence War resulting in violent protests by the Islamist opposition. Two ruling party activists were hacked to death in Kalaroa, while the Jamaat-e-Islami's activists firebombed train stations and blockaded roads. Another person died in clashes between police and Jamaat-e-Islami supporters in Noakhali, while a driver was killed after the party's activists chased him down. The opposition alliance called for a general strike on Sunday 15 December.

On 29 December 2013 the BNP called for a "March for Democracy" towards Dhaka, in defiance of a police ban, to protest against the election. Zia said: "The government is autocratic and illegal. It should step down immediately". One person was killed by the police in the centre of Dhaka, while a guard was killed in a blast at a train station. Some supporters of the ruling Awami League also clashed with opposition activists outside the Bangladesh Supreme Court. The BNP accused the police of barring Zia's car from leaving in order for her to lead the march. Thousands of security forces, mainly police, were present to prevent the opposition activists from rallying. Outside of the Supreme Court, police threw hot and coloured water from water cannons to disperse the protesters. Sheikh Hasina, while agreeing with the right of the opposition to protest, said: "You can wage anti-government agitation. But make sure people are not killed by your movement." A train was derailed by opposition activists in Gaibandha leading to three deaths.

On 30 December, the 18-party opposition alliance announced a non-stop blockade of roads, railways and waterways across the country from 1 January 2014 in order to resist the scheduled election. The decision came after they were barred from holding national demonstrations the previous day. The protest was termed the "March for Democracy." A general strike was called for 4, 5 and 6 January by the opposition parties.

On 3 and 4 January, opposition activists attacked potential polling centres across Bangladesh. They set fire to over 100 centres in Lakshmipur, Rajshahi, Pirojpur, Sylhet, Jhenaidah, Natore, Sirajganj and Brahmanbaria.

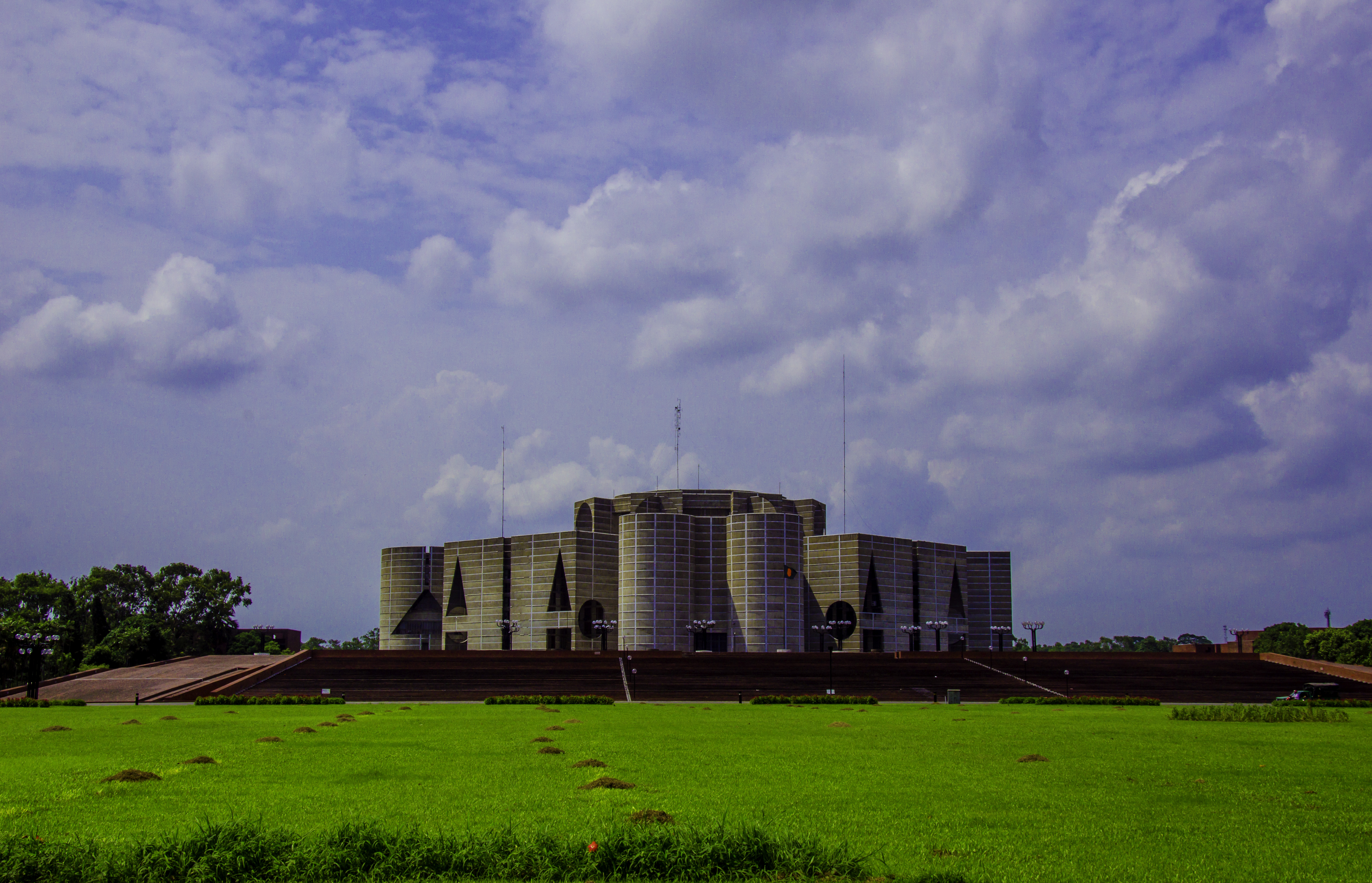
Jatiya Sangsad Bhaban (2014)

At least 18 people died in election day violence after security forces fired on protesters and opposition activists torched over 100 voting centres. In total 21 people died on the day and about 400 voting centers were disrupted. BNP and Jamaat-e-Islami activists also attacked their Awami League counterparts and Hindus in eight villages under Thakurgaon Sadar Upazila leaving 15 people injured and their houses and shops vandalised and looted. Further, a Hindu temple along with idols inside it were also attacked. The attacks spread through eight villages including Jhakua, Jhardanga, Baniyapara and Mondoppara. Hundreds of Hindus from these villages had fled fearing further attacks. On 7 January, two Hindus temples, Radha Gobind Mandir and Kali Mandir, were burnt by people suspected to be BNP party members. Fearing rape threats, female members of Hindu families were sent away to their relatives' homes by their families in Abhaynagar of Jessore, Dinajpur, and Thakurgaon. Attacks also occurred in Dinajpur, Rangpur, Bogra, Lalmonirhat, Rajshahi, Chittagong and Jessore.

== Crackdown on the opposition ==
Before the election there were reports of opposition leaders and members being killed and arbitrarily arrested by the police. According to Human Rights Watch and US Department of State, Bangladesh police arrested "thousands" of opposition members.

The government also interfered with opposition parties' organization of political events. In December 2013, police prevented opposition from holding pre-election rallies, citing security reasons. The police also prevented BNP supports from organizing outside the party headquarters.

Often opposition leaders were detained shortly after they announced strikes to protest the elections. In one case, authorities arrested 203 opposition and leaders and activists on 26 December, immediately after the opposition announced it would be holding a "March for Democracy" on 29 December. By 28 December, one day before the rally, the police had arrested more than thousand BNP and Jamaat members. Many of these were released in the evening or after the election. In another case, BNP vice president Hafizuddin Ahmed was arrested immediately after he urged "non-stop demonstrations" until the elections. The police charged him with firebombing a bus in 2013. After the election, he was released.

Khaleda Zia was prevented from leaving her home to attend a rally on 26 December, and kept under house arrest until the election. The government denied Zia was under house arrest. Zia's advisor Shamsher Mobin Chowdhury and Enam Ahmed Chowdhury were arrested on 29 December.

=== Media shutdown ===
Prior to the election, the government restricted opposition broadcasting. In 2013, ruling Awami League shut down TV stations and detained a prominent newspaper editor. The government said the measure was necessary to curb violence, but opposition saw this as politically motivated.

== Monitors ==
As a result of the boycott, the election commission suggested that the Awami League had already secured victory in 127 of the 153 uncontested seats. Similarly, Rowshan Ershad's (wife of H. M. Ershad) Jatiya Party had already won 21 uncontested seats, Jatiya Samajtantrik Dal won three seats, the Workers Party won two seats and the Jatiya Party (Manju) won one seat. The E.U., the U.S. and the Commonwealth announced that they would not send observers since they were concerned about the credibility of the election due to the boycott.

== Opinion polls ==
The ruling Awami League suffered electoral losses when, according to The Economist, the opposition BNP "thrashed the League in mayoral elections in June and July, notably in Gazipur in the industrial belt, hitherto one of the League’s safest constituencies" and polling data showed a plunge in the government's popularity. Similarly, just prior to the election, an opinion poll indicated the incumbent Awami League would lose to the BNP in a direct contest.

In the weeks following the election, a poll was conducted by Democracy International (DI), a US-based organization. They reported that the Awami League did have slightly more support than BNP, but acknowledged that the study's margin of error meant that the results were a "statistical dead heat".

== Results ==
The incumbent Bangladesh Awami League won the election with a safe majority, winning 234 seats. The election was controversial however as the opposition alliance boycotted the election.

As a result of the boycott, 153 of the 300 seats were uncontested, of which the Awami League won 127 by default, the Jatiya Party (Ershad) led by Rowshan Ershad won 20, the JSD won three, the Workers Party won two and the Jatiya Party (Manju) won one.

Results of 139 seats, out of remaining 147 seats (which were contested), were released, with the Awami League winning 105, the Jatiya Party (Ershad) winning 13, the Workers Party winning four, the JSD winning two and the Tarikat Federation and BNF winning one each. The remaining 8 constituencies election were suspended due to violence and election took place later. The newly elected MPs were sworn in on 9 January.

As a result of the boycott and violence voter turnout was lower than the previous few elections at only 40% in the 147 constituencies where an election took place, and as low as 22% in the capital, Dhaka.

Party	Votes	%	Seats		
Party	Votes	%	General	Women	Total
Awami League	12,357,374	72.14	234	39	273
Jatiya Party	1,199,727	7.00	34	6	40
Workers Party of Bangladesh	359,620	2.10	6	1	7
Jatiya Samajtantrik Dal	203,799	1.19	5	1	6
Bangladesh Tarikat Federation	177,449	1.04	2	0	2
Jatiya Party (Manju)	124,389	0.73	2	0	2
Bangladesh Nationalist Front	107,990	0.63	1	0	1
Bangladesh National Awami Party	7,120	0.04	0	0	0
Khelafat Majlish	5,725	0.03	0	0	0
Gano Front	2,717	0.02	0	0	0
Bangladesh Islami Front	2,585	0.02	0	0	0
Ganatantri Party	2,031	0.01	0	0	0
Independents	2,579,324	15.06	16	3	19
Total	17,129,850	100.00	300	50	350
Valid votes	17,129,850	98.49			
Invalid/blank votes	263,037	1.51			
Total votes	17,392,887	100.00			
Registered voters/turnout	43,943,184	39.58			
Source: Parliament, Election Commission, IPU

== Reactions ==
The day after the result, Hasina said that the boycott should "not mean there will be a question of legitimacy. People participated in the poll and other parties participated." However, she also said she offered Zia a role in a new government. "Look, I tried my best, I told you, I offered ministry, I offered to share power with our opposition. I have done as much as I can do but they didn't respond. Now if they realise that they made a mistake in not participating in the election, perhaps then they may come forward to discuss with us or make an offer. If they come forward to discuss with us, they have to leave all these terrorist activities behind because what they are doing it is absolutely killing people, killing police, killing innocent people." Information Minister Hasanul Haq Inu added that the turnout did not matter: "What is important is that the people defied violence." BNP Vice President Shamsher Chowdhury said that the low turnout indicated a desire for a new election. "This government must declare this election null and void and we need a new election organised by a non-party government. The government should not waste any more time."

=== International ===
- United Nations: UN Secretary-General Ban Ki-moon lamented that the election was neither peaceful nor inclusive. He criticised both the BNP and the Awami League saying they should "resume meaningful dialogue and to urgently address the expectations of the people of Bangladesh for an inclusive political process."
- United States: The United States said the election "did not appear to credibly express the will of the Bangladeshi people".
- United Kingdom: The United Kingdom expressed "disappointment" at the low voter turnout and criticized acts of violence and political harassment that had taken place.

=== Media ===
Dhaka's The Daily Star featured an editorial that called the election in the country's history and that the Awami League won "a predictable and hollow victory, which gives it neither a mandate nor an ethical standing to govern effectively." In similarly criticising the opposition, the editorial mentioned that "political parties have the right to boycott elections. They also have the right to motivate people to side with their position. But what is unacceptable is using violence and intimidation to thwart an election."

=== Aftermath ===
In the aftermath of the election, violence continued and the government continued the crackdown on the opposition. Police carried out raids and arrested opposition leaders. Other opposition leaders and members went into hiding, citing harassment by authorities. By 21 January, the government had arrested 7,015 activists and leaders of opposition, and placed a bounty of 100,000 taka ($1,300) on the heads of other protest leaders. Many of the protesters had destroyed vehicles and blockaded roads, and 29 people had died in the unrest.

This led to the 2015 Bangladeshi political crisis.

== See also ==
- List of members of the 10th Jatiya Sangsad
