= Tipu Sultan (politician) =

Bangladeshi politician

Member of Jatiyo Sangshad for Barisal-3
- In office 2014–2018

Personal details
- Born: 5 January 1967 (age 59)
- Party: Workers Party of Bangladesh

Tipu Sultan (born 5 January 1967) is a Bangladeshi politician. He has served as a member of the Jatiyo Sangshad since 2014, representing Barisal-3 for the Workers Party of Bangladesh

== Background ==
Sultan is an advocate by profession.
