= Kalaroa Upazila =

Kalaroa কলারোয়া
- Upazila
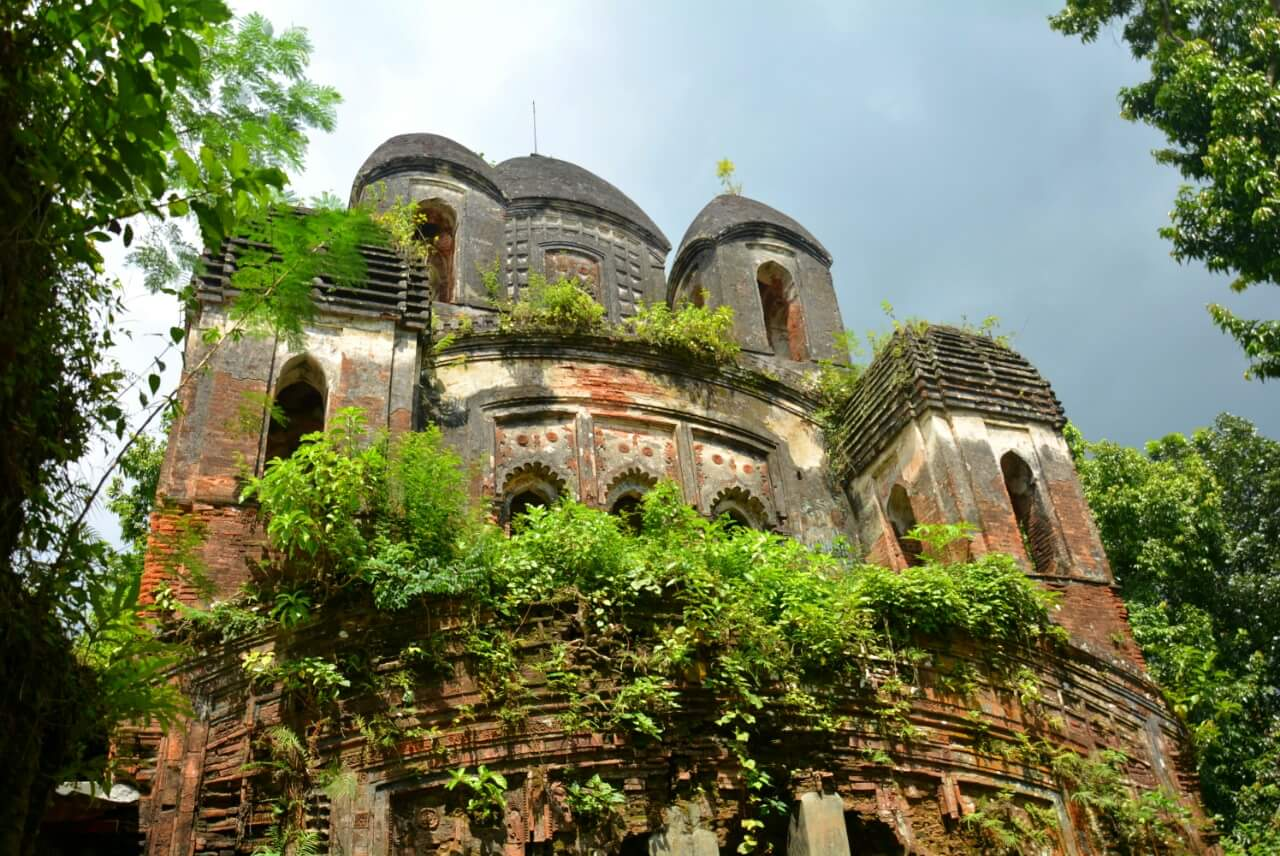
- Sam Sundar Temple

- Coordinates: 22°52.5′N 89°2.5′E
- Country: Bangladesh
- Division: Khulna
- District: Satkhira
- Seat: Kalaroa

Government
  - Member of Parliament: Vacant

Area
  - Total: 231.42 km^{2} (89.35 sq mi)

Population (2022)
  - Total: 261,270
  - Density: 1,129.0/km^{2} (2,924.1/sq mi)
- Time zone: UTC+6 (BST)
- Postal code: 9410
- Website: kalaroa.satkhira.gov.bd

Kalaroa Upazila mauza geocode map

Kalaroa (Bengali: কলারোয়া) is an upazila (sub-district) of Satkhira District in Khulna Division, Bangladesh. It was established in 1983.

== Geography ==
Kalaroa is located at 22.8750°N 89.0417°E. It has 59,282 households and a total area of 231.42 km^{2}.

Kalaroa borders Sharsha, Jhikargachha and Manirampur upazilas to the north, Satkhira Sadar and Tala upazilas to the south, Keshabpur, Manirampur and Tala upazilas and the Kobadak river to the east and Swarupnagar CD Block in North 24 Parganas district in the Indian state of West Bengal to the west.

The main rivers are the Kopothakho, Betraboti, Sonai, and Ichamati River.

== Demographics ==
Religions in Kalaroa Upazila (2022)
Religion	Percent
Islam	94.44%
Hinduism	4.76%
Christianity	0.78%
Other or not stated	0.02%

According to the 2022 Bangladeshi census, Kalaroa Upazila had 70,838 households and a population of 261,270. 8.23% were under 5 years of age. Kalaroa had a literacy rate of 72.79%: 75.46% for males and 70.30% for females, with a sex ratio of 94.76 males per 100 females. 40,875 (15.65%) lived in urban areas.

As of the 2011 Census of Bangladesh, Kalaroa upazila had 59,282 households and a population of 266,389. 44,020 (16.52%) were under 10 years of age. Kalaroa had an average literacy rate of 50.94%, compared to the national average of 51.8%, and a sex ratio of 1037 females per 1000 males. 29,283 (12.30%) of the population lived in urban areas.

According to the 1991 Bangladesh census, Kalaroa had a population of 190,721. Males constituted 50.96% of the population, and females 49.04%. The population aged 18 or over was 97,044. Kalaroa had an average literacy rate of 25.6% (7+ years), compared to the national average of 32.4%.

== Administration ==
Kalaroa Upazila is divided into Kalaroa Municipality and 12 union parishads: Chandanpur, Diara, Helatala, Jallabad, Jogikhali, Joynagar, Kaila, Keragachhi, Keralkata, Kushadanga, Langaljhara, and Sonabaria. The union parishads are subdivided into 112 mauzas and 136 villages.

Kalaroa Municipality is subdivided into 9 wards and 9 mahallas.

== Education ==
Colleges in the district include Begum Khaleda Zia Mahabiddalay.

== Notable residents ==
- Habibul Islam Habib, Ex-Member of Parliament.
- Feroze Ahmed Swapan, politician
