= Haider Akbar Khan Rono =

Bangladeshi politician, theorist and writer (1942–2024)

- হায়দার আকবর খান রনো
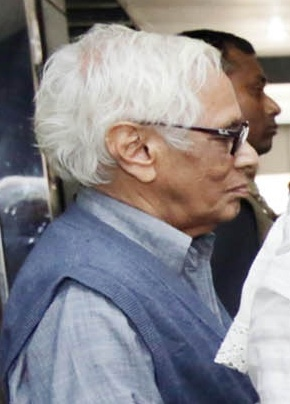
- Rono in 2016
- Born: 31 August 1942; Calcutta, Bengal Province, British India
- Died: 11 May 2024 (aged 81); Dhaka, Bangladesh
- Education: Bachelor of Laws
- Alma mater: Notre Dame College, Dhaka; University of Dhaka
- Occupations: Politician; theorist; writer
- Years active: 1960–2024
- Political party: Communist Party of Bangladesh
- Children: 1
- Relatives: Syed Nausher Ali (grandfather)

Haider Akbar Khan Rono (31 August 1942 – 11 May 2024) was a Bangladeshi politician, theorist and writer. He was a member of the presidium of the Communist Party of Bangladesh. He published 25 books and many booklets. He received the Bangla Academy Literary Award (2021).

== Early life ==
Rono was born on 31 August 1942 in Calcutta, Bengal Presidency, British India (now Kolkata, India) to engineer Hatem Ali Khan. His grandfather, Syed Nausher Ali, was an Indian politician and his younger brother, Haider Anwar Khan Juno, was a leftist politician and freedom fighter.

== Education ==
Rono passed the Matriculation Examination from St Gregory's High School in 1958 and was added to the 12th position of the merit list of the East Pakistan (now Bangladesh). Before, he studied at Jessore Zilla School and Rajshahi Collegiate School. In 1960, he passed the ISC from Notre Dame College, Dhaka. In 1960, he was admitted in the Department of Physics at the University of Dhaka, but couldn't finish the course for imprisonment and other causes. Later, when he was in prison, he completed a bachelor's degree in law.

== Career ==
Rono had to face imprisonment four times and had to go into hiding seven times for political reasons.

In 2006, Rono was awarded the Prothom Alo Best Book of the Year 1411.

Rono spoke against International Monetary Fund and the World Bank.

Since 2012, Rono was a presidium member of the Communist Party of Bangladesh.

In January 2022, Rono was awarded the Bangla Academy Literary Award.

== Work ==
Farashi Biplob Theke October Biplob ফরাসি বিপ্লব থেকে অক্টোবর বিপ্লব [From the French Revolution to the October Revolution] (in Bengali) (7th ed.). Bangladesh: Tarafdar Prokashoni. 2023.

Sotabdi Pariye শতাব্দী পেরিয়ে (বাংলা একাডেমি সাহিত্য পুরস্কার ২০২১) [Spanning Centuries (Bangla Academy Literary Award 2021)] (in Bengali). Bangladesh: Taraphadāra Prakāśanī. 2005. ISBN 9847790272.

Aurthoneeti Bishayok Kotipay Rachona অর্থনীতি বিষয়ক কতিপয় রচনা [Selected Essays on Economics] (in Bengali) (1st ed.). Bangladesh: Agradoot & Company. 2021. ISBN 9789849398363.

Nirbacito Prabondo 1 নির্বাচিত প্রবন্ধ-১ [Selected Essays-1] (in Bengali) (1st ed.). Bangladesh: Agradoot & Company. 2016. ISBN 9789849117339.

Bibidho Probandho Ei Somoyer Sahityo Sangskritir Koyekjon বিবিধ প্রবন্ধ : এই সময়ের সাহিত্য-সংস্কৃতির কয়েকজন [Miscellaneous Essays: Figures in Contemporary Literature and Culture] (in Bengali) (1st ed.). Bangladesh: Agradoot & Company. February 2023. ISBN 9789849450764.

Shotoborshe October Biplob শতবর্ষে অক্টোবর বিপ্লব [October Revolution at One Hundred Years] (in Bengali) (1st ed.). Bangladesh: Dyu Publication. 2024. ISBN 9789849776222.

Markosbader Prothom Path মার্কসবাদের প্রথম পাঠ [The First Lesson of Marxism] (in Bengali) (1st ed.). Bangladesh: Tarafdar Prokashoni. 2018. ISBN 9789849332213.

Markshiyo Ordhoniti মার্কসীয় অর্থনীতি [Marxist economics] (in Bengali) (6th ed.). Bangladesh: Tarafdar Prokashoni. 2024. ISBN 9847790132.

Palashi Theke Muktizuddha 1st Paper Moddhojug Theke 1947 Porjonto পলাশী থেকে মুক্তিযুদ্ধ ১ম পত্র মধ্যযুগ থেকে ১৯৪৭ পর্যন্ত [From Palashi to the Liberation War: Paper I — From the Medieval Period to 1947] (in Bengali) (2nd ed.). Bangladesh: Chayabithi. 2024. ISBN 9789849335306.

Palashi Theke Muktizuddha 2nd Paper 1947 Theke 1971 Porjonto পলাশী থেকে মুক্তিযুদ্ধ ২য় পত্র ১৯৪৭ থেকে ১৯৭১ পর্যন্ত [From Polashi to the Liberation War: Paper II (1947–1971)] (in Bengali) (1st ed.). Bangladesh: Chayabithi. 2019. ISBN 9789844360341.

Rajnitir Kotha Prosonge রাজনীতির কথা প্রসঙ্গে [Regarding politics] (in Bengali) (1st ed.). Bangladesh: Tarafdar Prokashoni. ISBN 9788947790154.

Bingsho Shotabdir Somajtontro O Pujibad বিংশ শতাব্দীর সমাজতন্ত্র ও পুঁজিবাদ [Socialism and capitalism in the 20th century] (in Bengali) (1st ed.). Bangladesh: Adarsha. 2024. ISBN 9789849852032.

== Death ==
Rono died at a private hospital in Dhaka on 11 May 2024, at the age of 81.
