= Satkhira =

Town in Bangladesh

Satkhira সাতক্ষীরা Satgharia
- City & Municipality
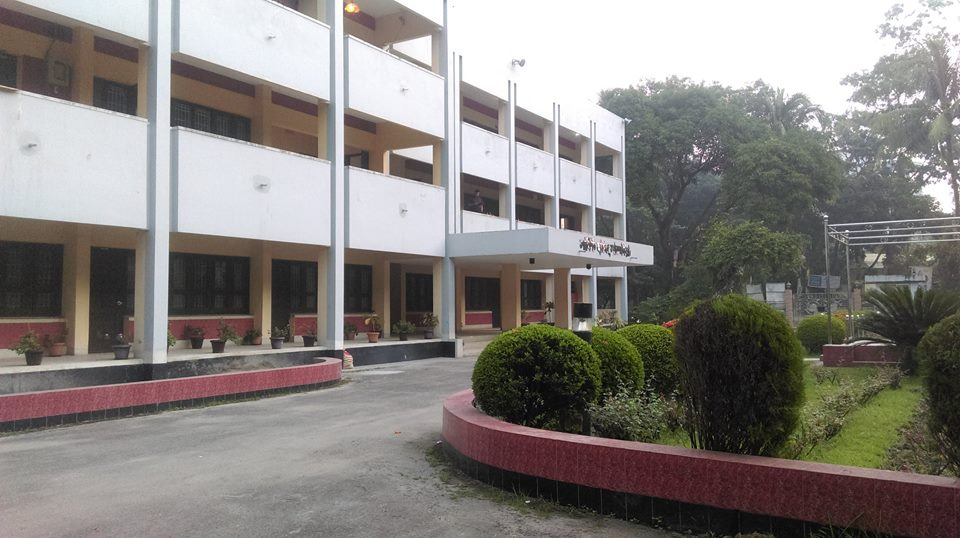
- Circuit House, Satkhira

- location of Satkhira in Bangladesh Satkhira (Bangladesh)
- Coordinates: 22.718802°N 89.071277°E
- Country: Bangladesh
- Division: Khulna
- District: Satkhira
- Upazila: Satkhira Sadar

Government
  - Type: Mayor–Council
  - Body: Satkhira Municipality
  - Mayor: Vacant (DC in Charge)

Area
  - Total: 32.39 km^{2} (12.51 sq mi)
  - Rank: 35th

Population (2011)
  - Total: 138,411
  - Density: 4,273/km^{2} (11,070/sq mi)
- Time zone: UTC+6 (Bangladesh Time)
- National Dialing Code: +880

Satkhira (Bengali: সাতক্ষীরা) is a town and district headquarters of Satkhira District and Satkhira Sadar Upazila in Khulna Division, southwestern Bangladesh. The city has a population of about 138,000, making it the 35th largest city in Bangladesh. Satkhira also has a large proportion of the Sundarbans mangrove forest of Bangladesh.

The area has suffered from saltwater intrusion into the water supply as a result of sea level rise, part of the effects of climate change in Bangladesh.

== History ==
Satkhira Municipality mahallah geocode map

In the name of Satkhira district, there are some common connotations. In the meantime, during the Permanent Settlement, Vishnur Chakraborty, a vassal of Raja Krishnachandra of Nadia, bought the old Pargana at auction and built houses in Satgharia village under his auspices. His son Prannath is known and admired for his development work in the Satgharia region. The Satkhira subdivision was born in 1852 as the fourth subdivision of Jessore district, with its headquarters in Kalaroa. Nawab Abdul Latif took charge of the first subdivision. In 1861, the sub-divisional office was shifted to Satgharia (Satkhira). Satghaira had already become Satkhira in the face of the British officers. So the old Satghariya Satkhira is present.

The location of Satkhira district is on the south-western corner of Bangladesh. This settlement was known in ancient times as the Old Island. Next to it is the location of Chandradwip, Madhudbip, Surya Divip, Sangadipi, Joydeep, etc. The small islands of the island are found in ancient history and maps. The exact date and exact information are not available on the old island of Burma. According to the Ramayana Mahabharata, the area of organized human habitation in the region was around 3,500 years ago. According to the Mahabharata, Muni Kapil founded a Kalimandir in Kapilmani of Paikgachha and worshiped there. He had done the work of establishing and worshiping this temple during the Mahabharata era. Alexander invaded India in 327 BC. At the time of his invasion of India, the mention of an independent state named Gangaridi was found in the mouth of the Ganges. The present Satkhira district was under the state.

After Alexander the Mauryan and the Gupta era, the old river was in Pundravadi. Burhanuddin was known at this time as the zhelmandal. Chandra Varman occupied the Creek region in the fourth century. After this, the state ruled as the independent ruler of Baulango Gupta (507–525) in southeast Bengal. In the seventh century, Shashanka, Bhadrasha, Khargorat, and the Loknath dynasty ruled this place. King Shashanka was history's most famous Narayan. This district most probably came under the authority of Sasanka, the ruler of Gauda, in the beginning of the 7th century A.D. Sasanka occupies a prominent place in the history of Bengal, as he is the first king of Bengal who extended his territorial overterritory bar beyond the geographical limits of the territories of Bengal. In the beginning of the 7th century, perhaps this district came under the authority of Shree Shankha chandra. Shashanka has occupied an important place in the history of Bengal. He was the first ruler of Bengal who expanded his sovereignty far beyond the geographical boundaries of Bengal, rather than just Bangla. King Shashanka himself did not settle the state with geography alone. He declared independence, occupied a number of states, and expanded the boundaries of his own kingdom. The reference to the kingdom of Gangaridai is derived from the traveler Hiuen Tsang (630 years old) who has traveled. During this period, Gangaridi was known as Pundravardhana, Karnasuvarna, Kajangal, Tamralipti, Samatata, etc. 'Satkhira district is part of this symmetry'

From the 8th to the eleventh centuries, this long-time Pal and Varman kings ruled Bengal. During their era, the history of civilization and the prosperity of culture gained fame in the name of Buddhist history and Buddhist culture. According to the records, during the Pala period, King Taillakya Chandra and Chandra of the Chandra Dynasty (930–957) were the independent kings of South East Bengal in the tenth century AD. During the time of Chandra Raja, South Bengal had a rich populace. The people of the Chandra Dynasty, a Buddhist religion, were popular rulers for some time. After Shri Kalyan Chandra (975-1003 AD), Ladhachandra (1000-1020 AD), and his next king Gobinda Chandra (10-10-1045 AD). Gobind Chandra is considered the most powerful king of the Chandra dynasty. When he was defeated by Chol Raj Rajendra Chola, the control of the southern region went to the Pala dynasty. From the middle of the eleventh century, the Palas ruled the south with Mahipala (995–1045), the third Viagra Pal (1058–1075), Mahipala II (1075–1088), and Rampal (1082-1124 AD). Pal Raja was a historian. The history revolted in the Kavatak rebellion in the late 11th century. Rampal is in power at this time. Burmans emerged in south-east Bengal due to the revolt of the Kaivarta. Men of this lineage are known as Brazzarm. Later, his son Jatavarmar won many wars and achieved sovereignty. In an inscription (1048–1049 AD) of Kalchuri Rajakarna, Jatavarm destroyed Khulna district and south-eastern Bengal with the king of the Chandra Dynasty. Jatavarma established his own dominant position in Kamrupa and Barind and established an independent state in south-eastern Bengal along with Khulna district. The other rulers of the Armor dynasty are Harivarm, Salwaram, Bhojajarma, and others. The postwar armaments of Bengal started the reign of the Senate. History cannot provide strong information about the advent of the Seven Dynasties. Vijay Sen's work is about the third ruler of this dynasty. His reign was from 1097 to 1160 AD. He was brought under the division of the split division, and the central government introduced it. Succeeded in supplanting the Varman's from south-eastern Bengal and the Pales from north and north-western Bengal. Thus, Vijay Sena had established the rule of the whole of Bengal. Vijay Sena was a Shaivite.

== Demographics ==
Religions in Satkhira Paurashava (2022)
Religion	Percent
Islam	89.78%
Hinduism	9.77%
Christianity	0.44%
Other or not stated	0.01%

According to the 2022 Bangladesh census, Satkhira Paurashava had 36,299 households and a population of 138,411. Satkhira had a literacy rate of 86.41%: 88.98% for males and 83.81% for females, and a sex ratio of 101.69 males per 100 females. 8.03% of the population was under 5 years of age.

At the time of the 2011 census, Satkhira had 26,896 households and a population of 113,322. 20,102 (17.74%) were under 10 years of age. Satkhira has a sex ratio of 967 females per 1000 males and a literacy rate of 69.3%.

== Climate ==
Climate data for Satkhira (1991–2020, extremes 1877-present)
Month	Jan	Feb	Mar	Apr	May	Jun	Jul	Aug	Sep	Oct	Nov	Dec	Year
Record high °C (°F)	30.9 (87.6)	36.7 (98.1)	39.2 (102.6)	41.0 (105.8)	43.4 (110.1)	39.9 (103.8)	37.1 (98.8)	37.0 (98.6)	36.8 (98.2)	36.0 (96.8)	34.2 (93.6)	31.0 (87.8)	43.4 (110.1)
Mean daily maximum °C (°F)	25.0 (77.0)	28.7 (83.7)	32.7 (90.9)	35.0 (95.0)	35.2 (95.4)	33.7 (92.7)	32.4 (90.3)	32.3 (90.1)	32.6 (90.7)	32.2 (90.0)	29.9 (85.8)	26.3 (79.3)	31.3 (88.3)
Daily mean °C (°F)	17.8 (64.0)	21.9 (71.4)	26.4 (79.5)	29.3 (84.7)	30.1 (86.2)	29.7 (85.5)	29.0 (84.2)	28.9 (84.0)	28.8 (83.8)	27.4 (81.3)	23.5 (74.3)	19.0 (66.2)	26.0 (78.8)
Mean daily minimum °C (°F)	12.0 (53.6)	15.9 (60.6)	20.7 (69.3)	24.4 (75.9)	25.7 (78.3)	26.5 (79.7)	26.4 (79.5)	26.3 (79.3)	25.9 (78.6)	23.8 (74.8)	18.6 (65.5)	13.5 (56.3)	21.6 (70.9)
Record low °C (°F)	4.9 (40.8)	9.0 (48.2)	12.1 (53.8)	16.1 (61.0)	19.0 (66.2)	21.5 (70.7)	18.5 (65.3)	21.7 (71.1)	22.2 (72.0)	17.0 (62.6)	11.5 (52.7)	6.5 (43.7)	4.9 (40.8)
Average precipitation mm (inches)	14 (0.6)	33 (1.3)	40 (1.6)	71 (2.8)	163 (6.4)	281 (11.1)	346 (13.6)	300 (11.8)	276 (10.9)	151 (5.9)	32 (1.3)	6 (0.2)	1,713 (67.4)
Average precipitation days (≥ 1 mm)	2	2	3	5	10	16	22	22	17	9	2	1	111
Average relative humidity (%)	74	71	69	72	75	82	85	85	86	82	77	75	78
Mean monthly sunshine hours	215.3	220.6	250.6	251.7	243.2	154.9	140.1	149.4	165.4	213.3	227.1	210.3	2,441.9
Source 1: NOAA
Source 2: Bangladesh Meteorological Department (humidity 1981-2010)

== See also ==
- Upazilas of Bangladesh
- Districts of Bangladesh
- Divisions of Bangladesh
- Upazila
- Thana
