= List of rivers of West Bengal =

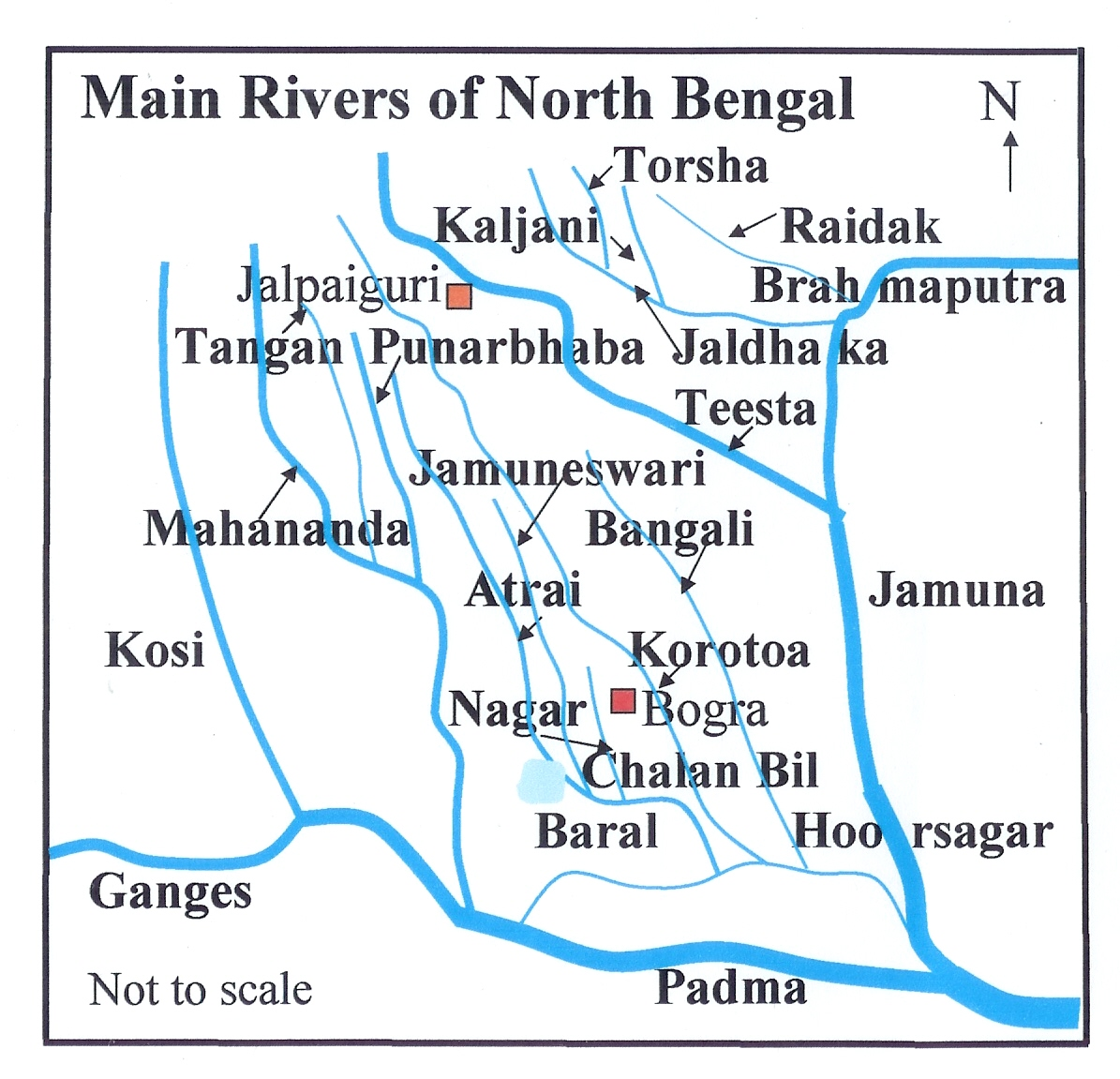
Rivers of North Bengal

Most of the rivers of West Bengal originate from the Himalayan in the north or from the Chota Nagpur Plateau in the west and flow south or southeast over the state. Due to the rivers in the western plains, the water is very scarce or bare at any other time of the year, especially in the fall of the Falgun-Chaitra, except during the monsoon. List of rivers of West Bengal state, located in Eastern India.

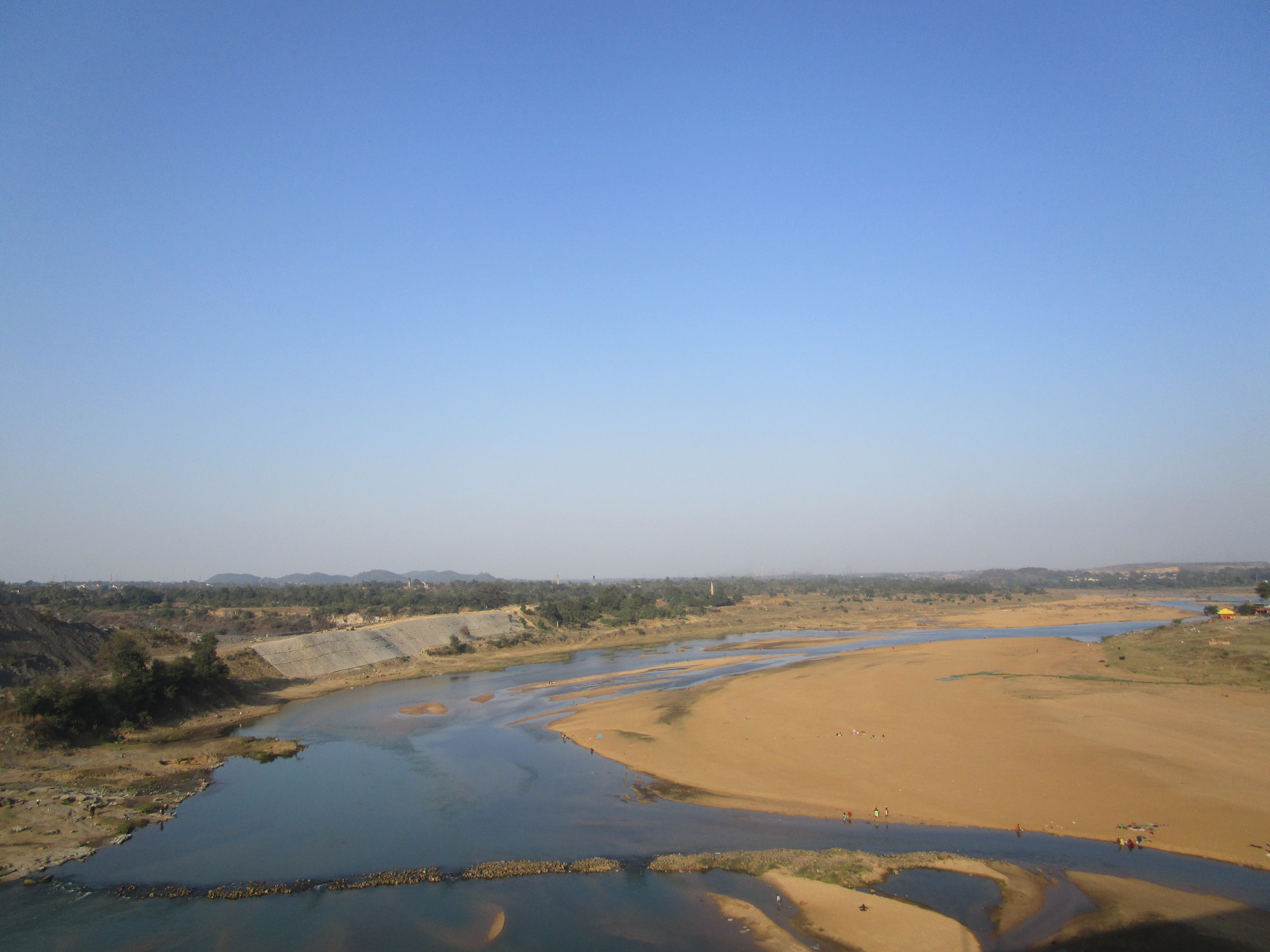
Barakar River at Asansol.

== Lists of rivers in Bengal ==
The major rivers of West Bengal state of India include:

- Adi Ganga
- Ajay River
- Anjana River
- Atrai River
- Bakreshwar River
- Balason River
- Baleshwar River
- Bansloi River
- Barakar River
- Bhagirathi River
- Banka River
- Behula River
- Bhairab River
- Bidyadhari River
- Brahmani River (Birbhum)
- Bhramaputhra River
- kanchan River Maharaja Hat
- Choita River
- Churni River
- Damodar River
- Dharla River
- Dud Kumar River
- Dwarakeswar River
- Dwarka River
- Gandheswari River
- Ganga River
- Ghargharia River
- Ghiya River
- Gosaba River
- Haldi River
- Hariabhanga River
- Hinglo River
- Hooghly River
- Ichamati River
- Jalangi River
- Jaldhaka River
- Jamuna River
- Kalindi River
- Kangsabati River
- Kaljani River
- kapaleswari River
- Karatoya River
- Keleghai River
- Ketha River
- Khari River
- Khong Khola
- Kopai River
- Kosai River
- Kulik River-Raigang
- Kunur River
- Kunti River
- Mahananda River
- Matla River
- Mathabhanga River
- Mayurakshi River
- Mechi River
- Mundeswari River
- Muri Ganga River
- Piyali River
- Punarbhaba River
- Raidāk River
- Raimangal River
- Rangeet River
- Rasulpur River
- Rupnarayan River
- Sali River (West Bengal)
- Sankosh River
- Saptamukhi River
- Saraswati River (Bengal)
- Shil Torsa River
- Shilabati River
- Singimari River
- Subarnarekha River
- Talma River
- Tangon River
- Teesta River
- Thakuran River
- Torsha River

== Rivers of the Sundarbans ==
- Piyali River
- Murrigonga River
- Thakhuran River
- Matala River
- Goshaba River
- Harrivnga River
- Saptamukhi River
- Jamira River
- Raimangal River
- Bidyadhari River
- Kalnagini River

== See also ==
- Environment of West Bengal
- Lists of rivers of India
- List of Rivers of Nadia
