= Geography of West Bengal =

Location of West Bengal

The Geography of West Bengal, a state in eastern India, is primarily defined by plains and plateaus, with the high peaks of the Himalayas in the north and the Bay of Bengal to the south.

== Location and extent ==
Districts of West Bengal

West Bengal is on the eastern neck of India, stretching from the Himalayas in the north to the Bay of Bengal in the south. It lies between 85 degree 50 minutes and 89 degree 50 minutes east longitude, and 21 degrees 25 minutes and 27 degrees 13 minutes north latitude. The state has a total area of 88,752 square kilometres (34,267 sq mi). With Bangladesh on its eastern border, the state forms the ethno-linguistic region of Bengal. To its northeast lie the states of Assam and Sikkim and the country of Bhutan. To its southwest is the state of Odisha. To the west, it borders the states of Jharkhand and Bihar, and to the northwest, Nepal. The capital of the state is Kolkata, the third-largest urban agglomeration and the seventh-largest city in India.

== Political geography ==
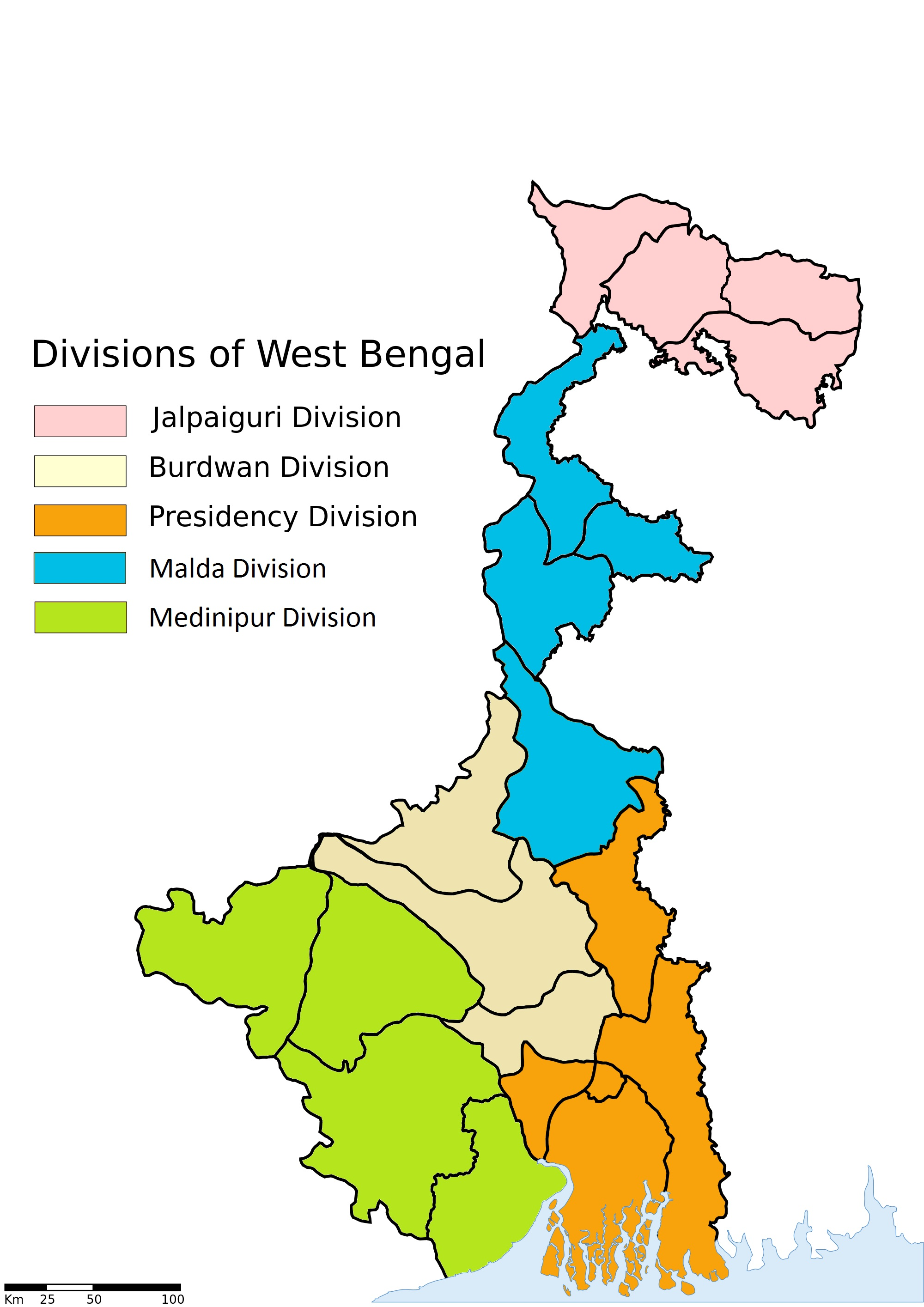
Divisions of West Bengal

There are 23 districts and 5 divisions in West Bengal. The Burdwan Division consists of Paschim Bardhaman, Purba Bardhaman, Birbhum, and Hooghly; Medinipur division consists of Purba Medinipur, Paschim Medinipur, Jhargram, Bankura and Purulia; the Jalpaiguri Division consists of Alipurduar, Cooch Behar, Darjeeling, Jalpaiguri, and Kalimpong; the Malda division consists of Uttar Dinajpur, Dakshin Dinajpur, Murshidabad and Malda, and the Presidency Division consists of Kolkata, Nadia, North 24 Parganas, South 24 Parganas and Howrah. The newly added 7 districts are Ranaghat, Jangipur, Berhampur, Bishnupur, Sundarban, Icchemati and Bashirhat.

Each district is governed by a district collector or district magistrate, appointed either by the Indian Administrative Service or the West Bengal Civil Service. Each district is subdivided into Sub-Divisions, governed by a sub-divisional magistrate, and again into Blocks. Blocks consists of panchayats (village councils) and town municipalities. Often, the districts north of the Ganges (i.e., Cooch Behar, Darjeeling, kalimpong, Jalpaiguri, Alipurduar, North Dinajpur, South Dinajpur, and Malda) are together called North Bengal.

The capital of the state is Kolkata – the third-largest urban agglomeration and the seventh-largest city in India. Asansol is the second largest city and urban agglomeration in West Bengal after Kolkata. Siliguri is an economically important city, strategically located in the northeastern Siliguri Corridor (Chicken's Neck) of India. Other major cities and towns in West Bengal are Howrah, Durgapur, Raniganj, Haldia, Jalpaiguri, Kharagpur, Burdwan, Darjeeling, Midnapore, and Malda.

== Landforms ==
=== Darjeeling Himalayan hill region ===
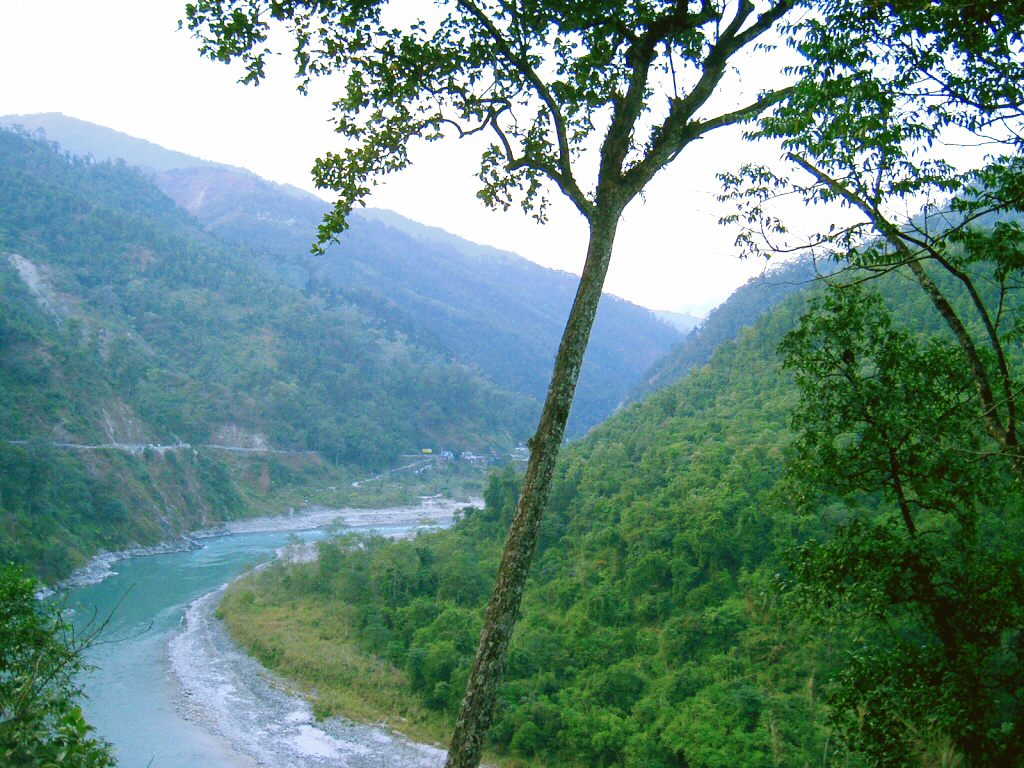
National Highway 31A winds along the Teesta River near Kalimpong, in the Darjeeling Himalayan hill region.

Darjeeling Himalayan hill region is situated to the north of the state. This region belongs to the Eastern Himalaya range. The entire Darjeeling district (except the Siliguri subdivision and northern parts of Jalpaiguri and Alipurduar districts) falls under this zone, which starts abruptly from the Terai region. The deep gorges of Teesta River, which runs from north to south have divided this mountainous region into two parts: the western mountains (west of Teesta) and the eastern mountains (east of Teesta).

==== The Western Mountains ====
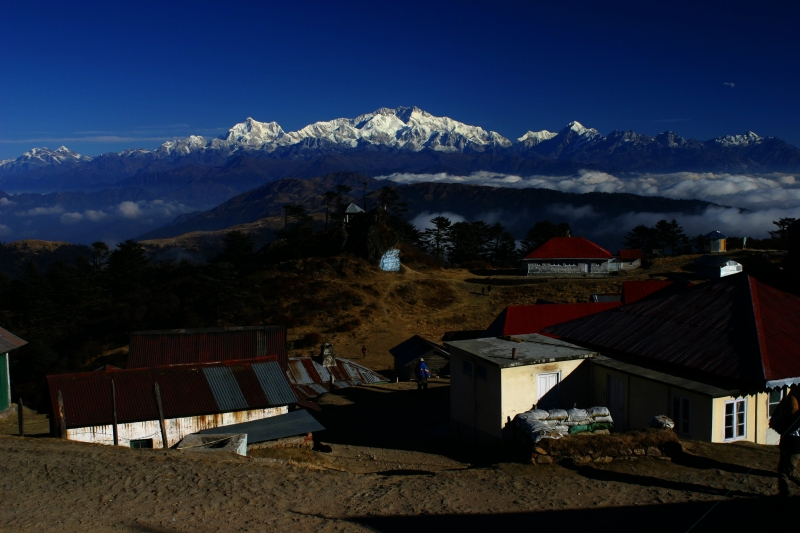
Singalila Range and Kanchenjungha from Sandakphu

The western mountains are the higher part of Darjeeling Himalayan range, with an average height of 2,200 m (7,200 ft). They spread from Nepal border to the Teesta river, and primarily consist of two mountain ranges: the Singalila Range and the Darjeeling range. The Singalila Range is located along the border of Darjeeling district and Nepal. It separates West Bengal from Nepal. Singalila starts from Western Sikkim and penetrates into Darjeeling district. It has four important peaks higher than 3,000 m: Sandakphu (3,636 m), Phalut (3,595 m), Sabargram (3,543 m), and Tonglu (3,036 m). Among the Himalayan ranges of this region, Singalila Range hosts Sandakphu (3,636 m), the highest peak in West Bengal. Kanchenjunga (the world's 3rd highest peak), Everest (world's highest peak), Lhotse (world's 4th highest peak), and Makalu (world's 5th highest peak) can be seen from the Singalila Range.

The Darjeeling range rises steadily from Terai area. Located within this range, Ghum railway station (2,258 m) is the highest rail station in India. The famous Tiger Hill (2,567 m) is situated at the middle of this mountain chain and is a viewpoint from which some of the world's tallest peaks can be seen, including Kanchenjunga, Everest, Lhotse, and Makalu. Three minor mountain chains start from Tiger Hill: Darjeeling Lebong in the north, Takdah Peshok in the northeast, and Bagora Dowhill in the south. Sinchal (2,615 m) is one of the well-known peaks here.

==== The Eastern Mountains ====
The eastern side of the Darjeeling Himalayan mountains are lower than the western side, with an average altitude of 1,900 m (6,200 ft). Durpin Dara and Chola are two major mountain chains of this part.

The Durpin Dara chain holds the highest peak of eastern part: Rishila, at 3,121 metres (10,240 ft). There are two peaks, Renigango (1,885 m) and Chhoto Sinchula (1726m) to the north of Jalpaiguri district. The Buxa hill is located at the east end of this region. Sangchuli is the highest peak of the Buxa hills. Kalimpong town is one of the well-known towns of this area.

The Darjeeling Himalayan Railway (simply known as "toy train") has been listed in UNESCO world heritage sites.

=== Terai region ===
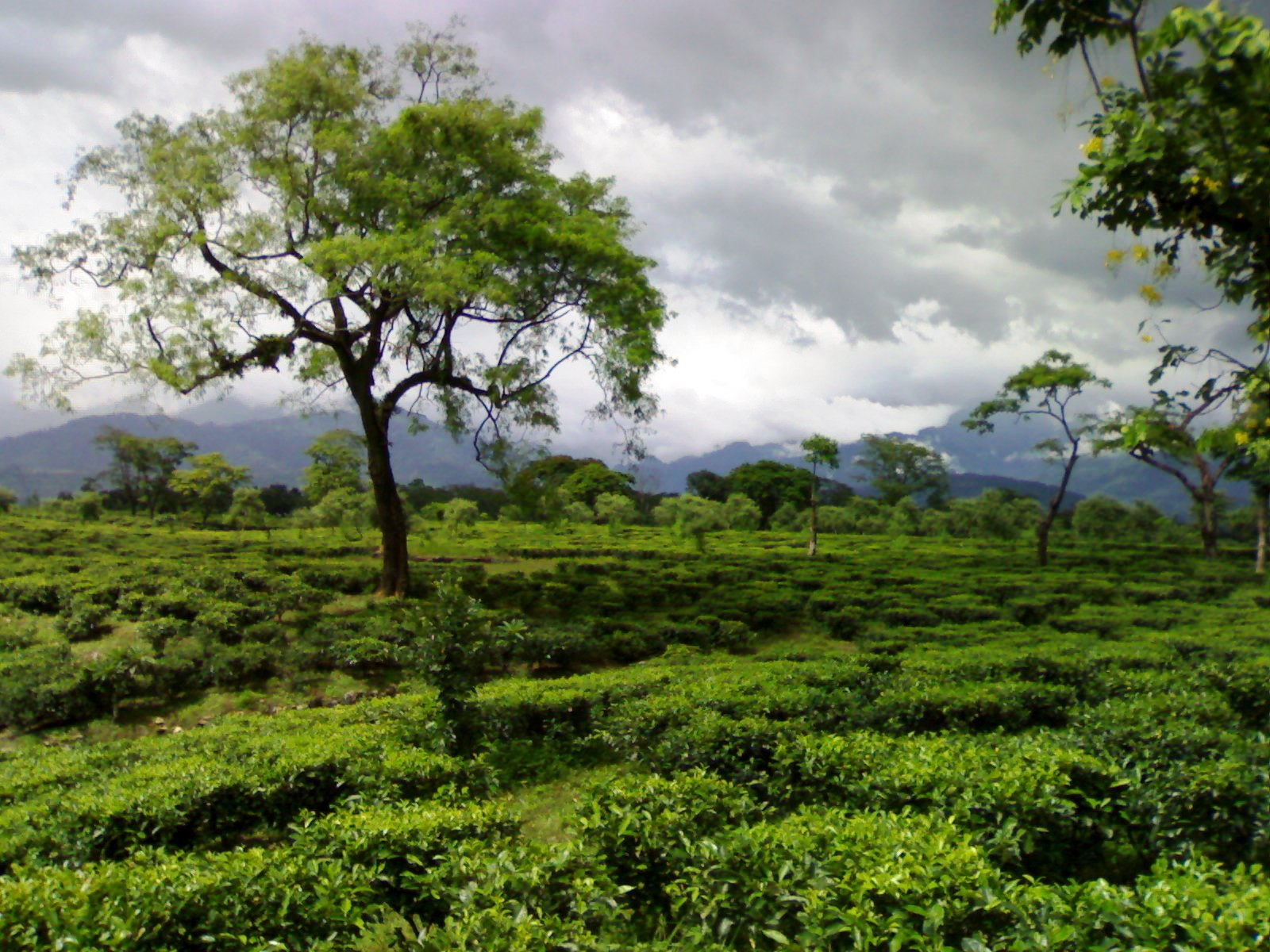
A tea garden in Dooars with the background of the Himalayas

The Teesta River divides the area into two parts: the Terai to the west and the Dooars (or Duars) to the east. The Dooars region can be further subdivided into the Siliguri (Western) Dooars, the Jalpaiguri (Middle) Dooars, and the Alipur (Eastern) Dooars.

The Terai ("moist land") is a belt of marshy grasslands, savannas, and forests at the base of the Himalaya range stretching southwards about 38 km. Above the Terai belt lies the Bhabar, a forested belt of rock, gravel, and soil eroded from the Himalayas. The Terai zone is composed of alternate layers of clay and sand, with a high water table that creates many springs and wetlands. The Terai zone is inundated yearly by the monsoon-swollen rivers of the Himalayas. The Terai–Duar savanna and grasslands is an ecoregion that stretches across the middle of the Terai belt, consisting of tall grasslands, savannas, evergreen forests, and deciduous forests [.

The Terai and Dooars region politically constitute the plains of Darjeeling District, the whole of Jalpaiguri and Alipurduar district, and the upper region of Cooch Behar District in West Bengal. The slope of the land is gentle, from north to south. The general height of the land is 80–100 m. The entire region is made up of sand, gravel, and pebbles laid down by Himalayan rivers including the Teesta, Torsa, Raidak, Jaldhaka, Sankosh, and Mahananda.

=== North Bengal plains ===
The North Bengal plains start from the south of Terai region and continue up to the left bank of the Ganges. The southern parts of the district Jalpaiguri, North Dinajpur baring some extreme northern regions, South Dinajpur, Malda, Alipurduar and southern part of Cooch Behar districts constitute this geographical region. The narrow land mass in the North Dinajpur district is known as Mahananda Corridor. This corridor runs north to south joining Malda with the plains of Jalpaiguri, Alipurduar and Cooch Behar. The entire part of North and South Dinajpur is silt laden plain.

The Mahananda River divides the district of Malda into two parts. The eastern part (known as Barind or Barendrabhumi) consists of undulating plains and tilas, and is made up of old alluvium and is part of the Ganges Delta. In contrast, the western part is made up of new alluvium, and here the Kalindi River joins the Mahananda River. The area north of the Kalindi River is a lowland covered with swamps and beels (small water bodies) and is known as tal. In contrast, the area south of the Kalindi is a very fertile land and is known as diara.

The plain south of Jalpaiguri, Alipurduar, and Cooch Behar district is also made of new alluvium deposited by numerous rivers including the Teesta, Torsa, Raidak, Jaldhaka, Sankosh, Balason, Punarbhaba, and Atrai [1].

=== Rarh region ===
Rarh is the region that intervenes between the Vajjabhumi and the Ganges Delta. This region is composed of parts of the districts Murshidabad, Birbhum, Bankura, Purba Bardhaman, Paschim Bardhaman, Purba Medinipur, and Paschim Medinipur. The region is about 50–100 m above sea level, and is believed to consist of soil from the Deccan plateau. The area is formed by the silt brought by the tributaries of the Bhagirathi, Mayurakshi River, Ajay River, Damodar, and Rupnarayan rivers, which flow through the red laterite soil of the western plateau region. The land is sloped from west to southeast, and the formation of natural levees along the riverbanks is a common phenomenon.

=== Coastal plain ===
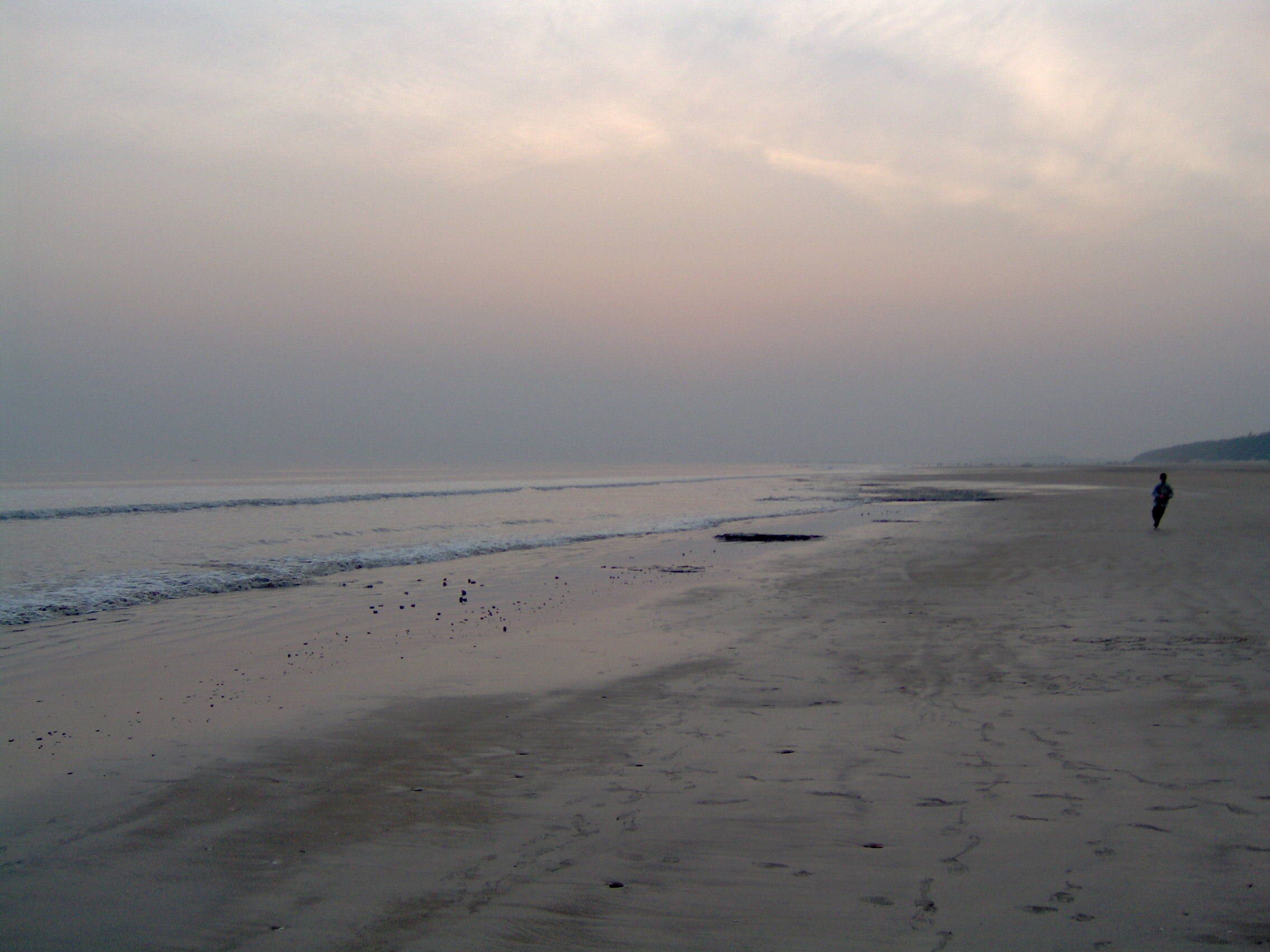
Shankarpur beach near Digha is a part of this coastal plain

A small coastal region is on the extreme south of the state. A part of the district of Purba Medinipur along the Bay of Bengal constitutes the coastal plain. This emergent coastal plain is made up of sand and mud deposited by rivers and wind. Parallel to the coast are areas of sand dunes and marsh. The Digha dunes lie nearest to the Bay of Bengal, while the Kanthi dunes are the farthest from it. In some areas, dunes occur at a distance of 15–16 km from the coast and are 11–12 m high [2].

=== Western plateau and high lands ===
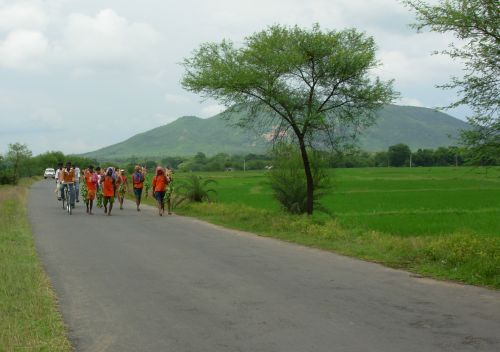
Susunia hill

The western part of Purulia, Bankura, Birbhum, Bardhaman, and Paschim Medinipur districts constitute the western plateau and highlands, which form the eastern fringes of the Chota Nagpur Plateau. Geologically, this area is made of igneous rocks of the Archaean era as well as coal-bearing mudstone and quartzite rocks of Carboniferous period. Because of long and continuous erosion, the whole region has been transformed into an undulating peneplain. This area is interspersed by small monadnocks locally known as tila. Some of the important hills in the area include Ajodhya Hills (677 m), Panchet (643 m), and Baghmundi in Purulia, and Biharinath (452 m) and Susunia (442 m) in Bankura. Gorgaburu in the Ayodhya Hills (677 m) is the highest point in the region.

The average altitude in the area ranges from 100 to 500 m. The area has a slope from the west to the east.

There are some badlands in this region. The Sinhati Badlands are located 4 km northwest of Bishnupur town in the Sinhati area of Bankura district. The Gangani (or Garbheta) Badlands are located in Paschim Midinipur district beside river Shilabati. These badlands are also known as Grand Canyon of West Bengal.

=== Ganges delta ===
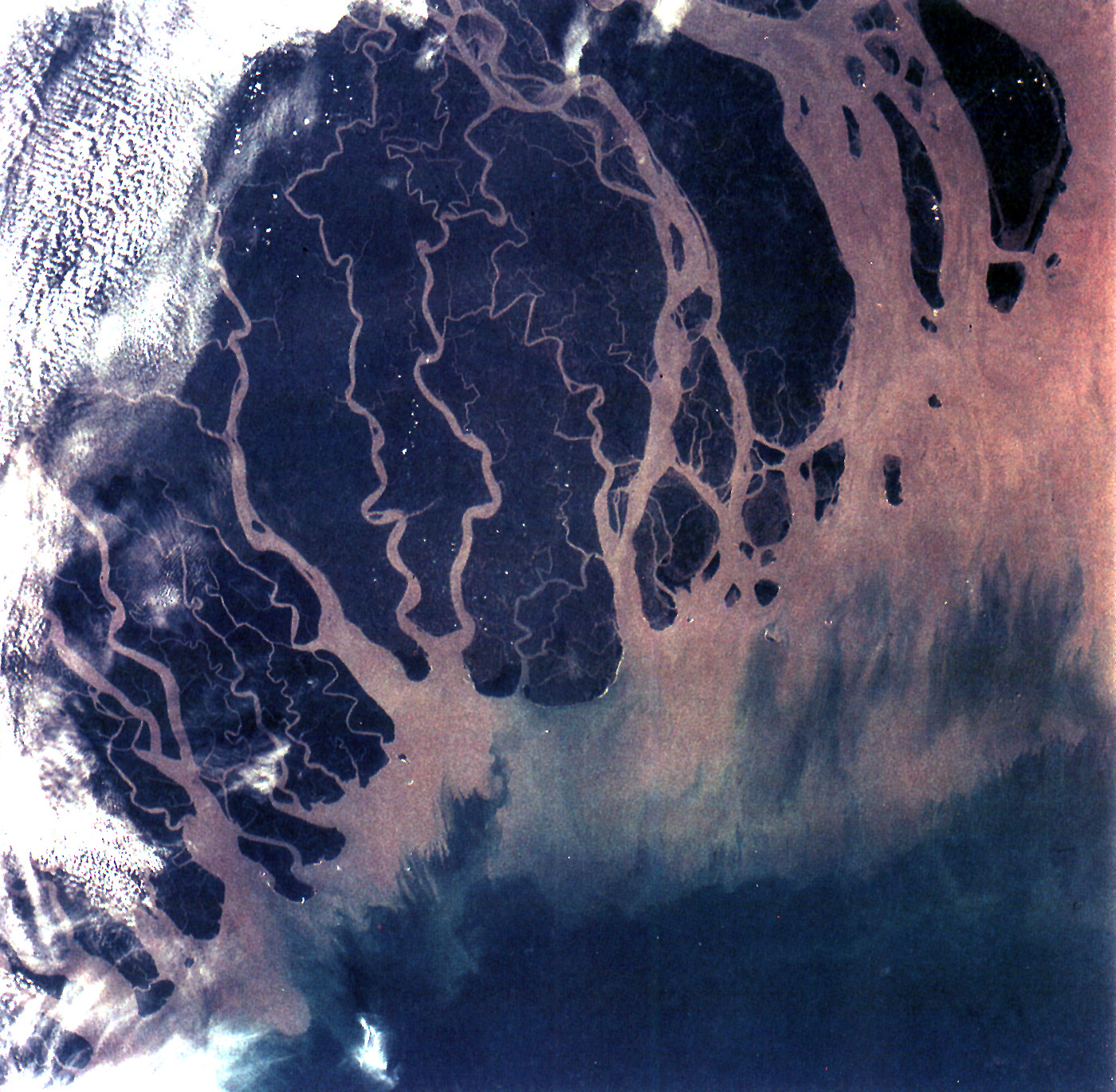
Ganges river delta, in Bangladesh and India

The Ganges Delta covers the entirety of Nadia, Kolkata, North 24 Parganas, and South 24 Parganas districts, and the eastern half of Murshidabad district. The Ganges passes through this vast area and divides into three distinct parts: the old delta, the mature delta, and the active delta.

The old delta consists of the districts of Murshidabad and Nadia. The formation of delta is complete and the rivers here are heavily silted and many have even dried up over time. Silted rivers, swamps, beels, and oxbow lakes form the area. This area is also known as Bagri region.

The districts of Kolkata and North 24 Parganas form mature delta region. The rivers are slow and meandering and frequently shift their courses. Swamps, beels, and oxbow lakes characterise the scenery. The district of South 24 Parganas is known to be the active delta of the Ganges, where the formation of the delta is still an ongoing process.

== Agro-climatic groups ==
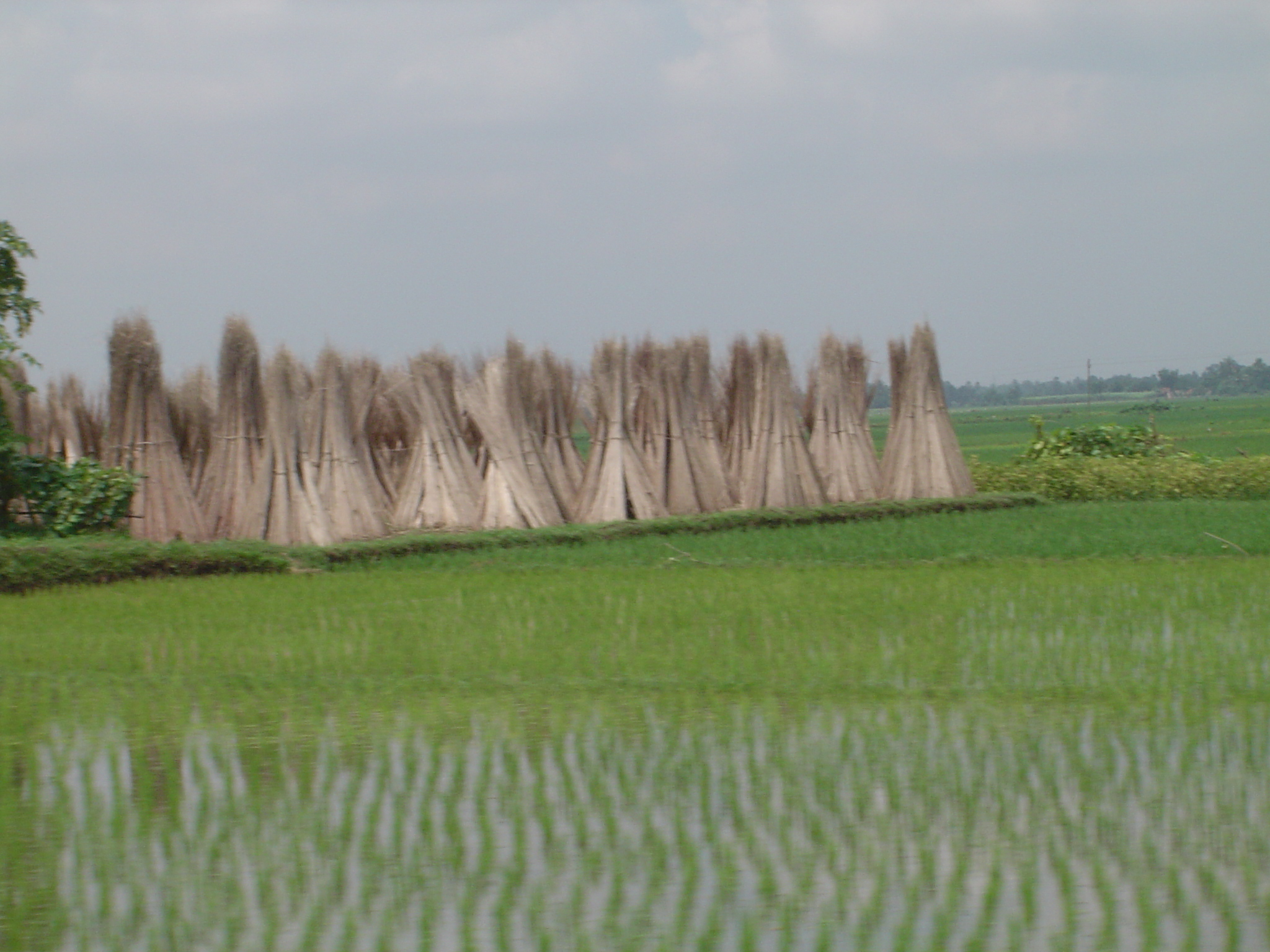
Agriculture is leading occupation in the state. Shown here are freshly sown saplings of paddy; in the background are stacks of jute sticks.

Depending on soil and climate variations, West Bengal can be divided into six broad divisions:

- The hill region in the north
- The Terai and Teesta alluvial region of North Bengal
- The laterectic, red and gravely undulating region in the west
- The coastal alluvial region in the south
- The Gangetic alluvial region in the east
- The Vindhya alluvial region in the centre

== Rivers ==
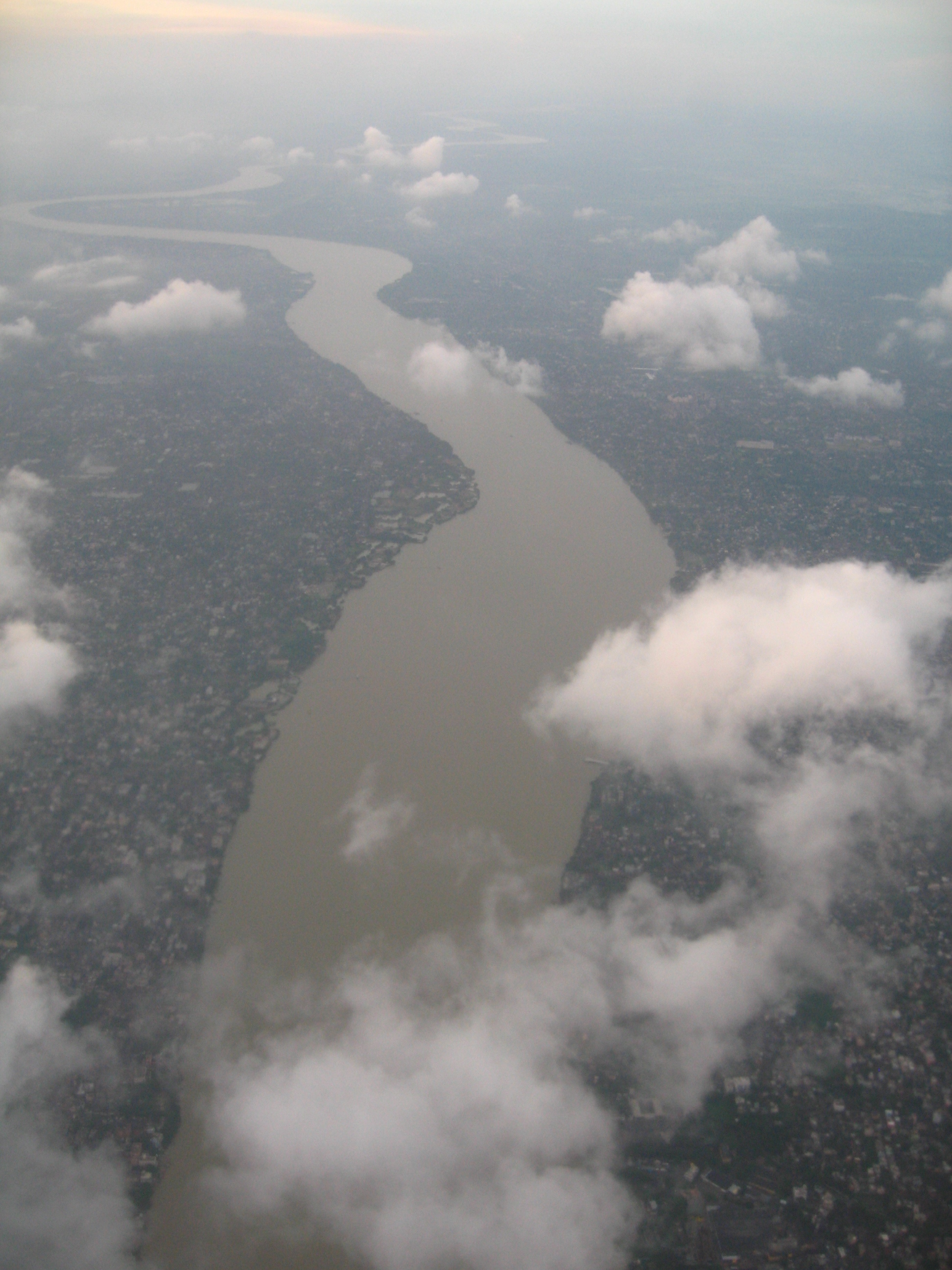
Hooghly River viewed over the town of Bally, Howrah

The Ganges enters West Bengal near Rajmahal and then flows in a southeasterly direction. It divides in two near north of Dhulian in Murshidabad district. One branch enters Bangladesh as the Padma (or Pôdda), while the other flows through West Bengal as the Bhagirathi and Hooghly River in a southern direction. The Bhagirathi-Hooghly is the main river in West Bengal, and flows past some of the important cities like Murshidabad, Baharampur, Nabadwip, Chinsurah, Chandannagar, Srirampur, Howrah, Kolkata, Diamond Harbour, and Haldia. It empties into Bay of Bengal near Sagar Island in the South 24 Parganas district.

Numerous rivers flow eastwards through West Bengal and join the Bhagirathi on the right bank. These include:

- The Mayurakshi River—which is fed by the Brahmani, Dwarka, Bakreshwar, and Kopai—joins the Bhagirathi near Kandi, Murshidabad.
- The Ajay River, which rises in the hills of Bihar and is joined by the Kunur, flows down the plateau fringe, marking the boundary between Bardhaman and Birbhum districts and joining the Bhagirathi near Katwa.
- The Damodar River joins the Bhagirathi near Uluberia. The river is also known as "the sorrow of Bengal", and controlled by the Damodar Valley Project.
- The Dwarakeswar and Shilabati rivers join to form the Rupnarayan River. The Kangsabati and Keleghai rivers join to form the Haldi River. The Rupnarayan and Haldi then join the Bhagirathi in the East Midnapur district.
- The Subarnarekha River, after flowing for a short distance in West Bengal, re-enters into Orissa [1].

Similarly, several rivers flow westwards into West Bengal and join the Bhagirathi on its left bank. These include:

- The Bhairab River and the Jalangi River, which join together (then known as Jalangi) before joining the Bhagirathi.
- The Mathabhanga River, which divides into two branches: the Churni and Ichhamati. The Churni meets the Bhagirathi, while the Ichhamati flows southwards and joins the Kalindi River.

These rivers carry with them plenty of water, keeping the Bhagirathi River submerged with water throughout the year. The rivers also carry silt and sand eroded from the western plateaus and deposit them in the Bhagirathi. This silting causes trouble for the Kolkata Port and often causes flooding during years of heavy rain.

The Sunderbans region is covered by numerous estuaries and streams, mainly distributaries of main rivers [3]. The rivers are interconnected and are fed by tidal waters. The major rivers of the area are the Hooghly, Matla, Gosaba, Saptamukhi, Haribhanga, Piyali, Thakuran (or Jamira), Raimangal, Kalindi, and Ichhamati [4].

The Teesta River cuts deep gorges from north to south in the mountainous Darjeeling district. It then enters the plains at Sevoke and flows in a mighty stream in a straight line towards the southeast, until it pours into the Brahmaputra River in Bangladesh.

The Torsa, Jaldhaka, Kaljani, Raidak, Sankosh, and Mahananda rivers originate in the northern hilly region which rise in the Himalayas and flow in a southerly direction through the districts of Darjeeling, Alipurduar, Jalpaiguri, Cooch Behar and North and South Dinajpur, before entering Bangladesh. As most of the rivers are fed by snow, they are perennial in nature and often flood during the rainy season. The entire region is made up of sand, gravel, and pebbles laid down by these rivers. The Mahananda rises from the Dow Hills forest, near the town of Darjeeling, and runs in a zig-zag course through the district of Malda and joins the Padma in Bangladesh. In the central region, the main river is the Mahananda. The Tangon, Punarbhabha, and Atrai rivers arise in the plains; the former two join and flow into the Mahanadi, while the Atrai flows into the Padma [1].

== Wetlands ==
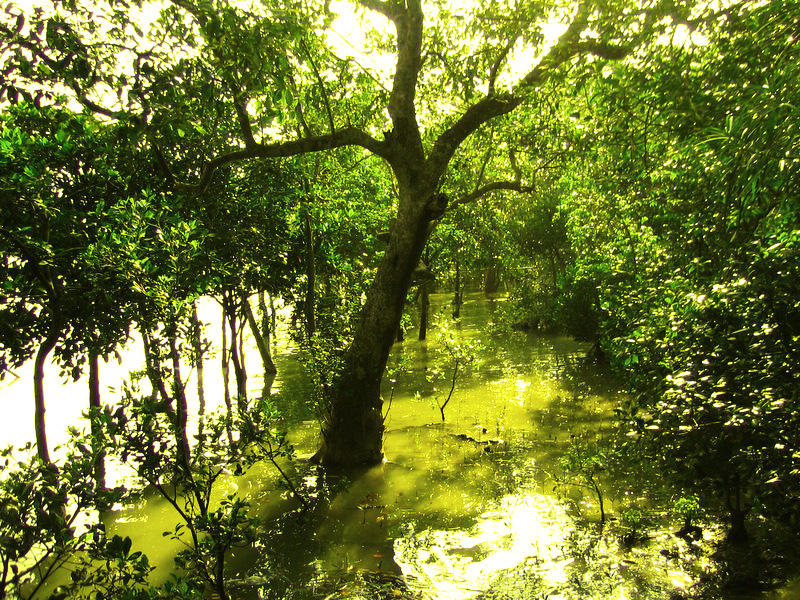
Sundari trees in the Sundarbans

The Sundarbans delta is the largest mangrove forest in the world, situated in the South 24 Parganas district. It lies at the mouth of the Ganges and is spread across areas of Bangladesh and West Bengal. The Bangladeshi and Indian portions of the jungle are both UNESCO world heritage sites, separately listed as the Sundarbans and Sundarbans National Park respectively, though they are parts of the same forest [3]. The Sundarbans are intersected by a complex network of tidal waterways, mudflats, and small islands of salt-tolerant mangrove forests, and present an excellent example of ongoing ecological processes [4].

The average elevation of the area is 10 m. This area has been created by the deposition of silt from its numerous rivers—the Hooghly, Matla, Jamira, Gosaba, Saptamukhi, and Haribhanga—and their tributaries. The formation of the delta is an ongoing process, and new bars and islands are being created along the rivers and at the river mouth. A large percentage of the area is underwater during incoming tides.

The area is known for its wide range of fauna. The most famous among these is the royal Bengal tiger, but numerous species of birds, spotted deer, crocodiles, and snakes also inhabit it. It is estimated that there are now 400 Bengal tigers and about 30,000 spotted deer in the area [5].

== Climate ==
Average annual rainfall in West Bengal

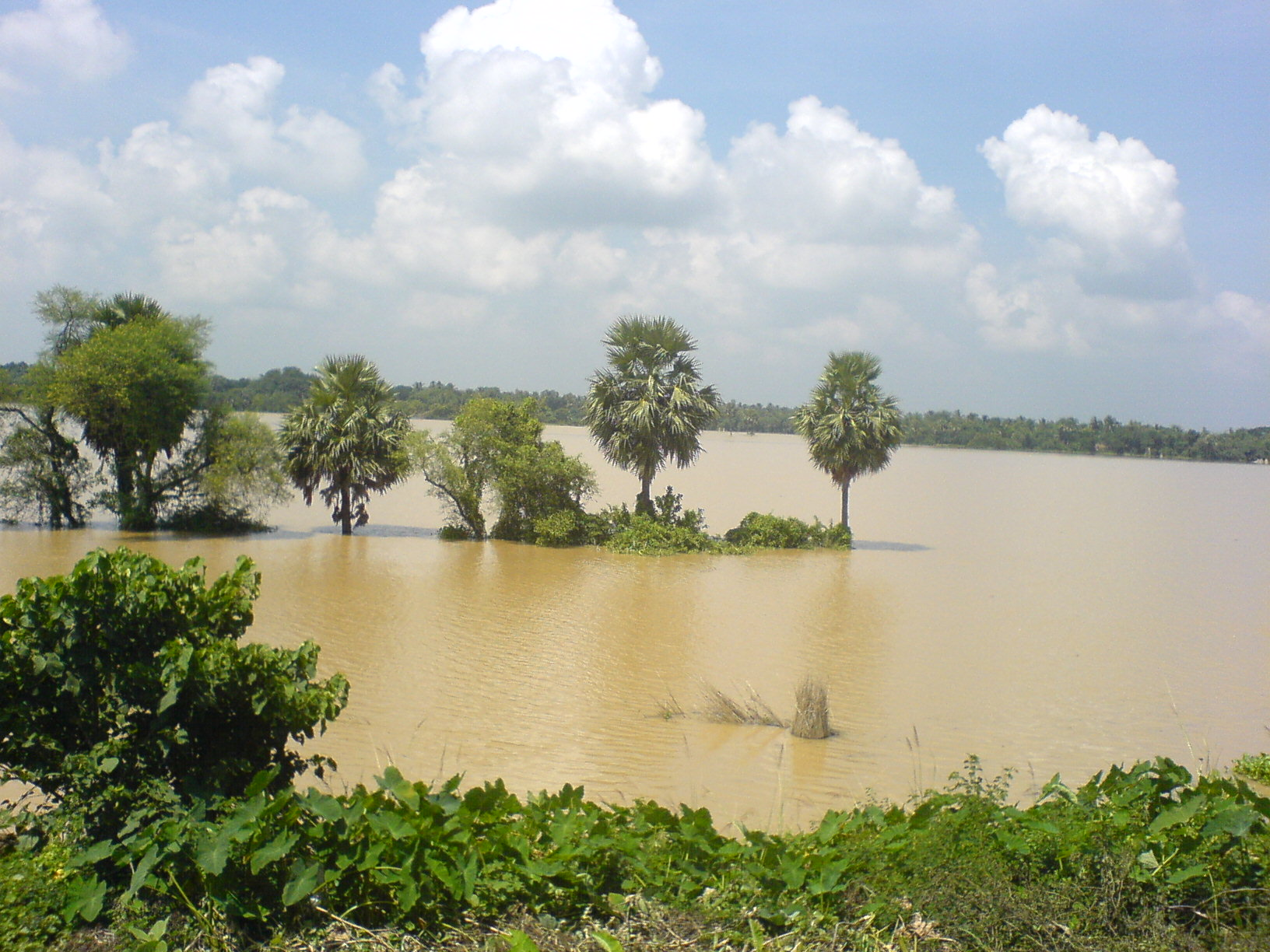
Many areas flood during the heavy rains brought by monsoon

West Bengal's climate varies from tropical savannah in the southern portions to humid subtropical in the north. The main seasons are summer, rainy season, a short autumn, and winter. While the summer in the delta region is noted for excessive humidity, the western highlands experience a dry summer like northern India, with daily high temperatures ranging from 38 °C (100 °F) to 45 °C (113 °F). At nights, a cool southerly breeze carries moisture from the Bay of Bengal.

In early summer, brief squalls and thunderstorms known as kal-baisakhi often arrive from the north or northwest. Monsoons bring rain to the whole state from June to September. West Bengal receives the Bay of Bengal branch of the Indian Ocean monsoon that moves in a northwest direction. Winter (December–January) is mild over the plains with average daily low temperatures of 15 °C (59 °F). A cold and dry northern wind blows in the winter, substantially lowering the humidity level. However, the Darjeeling Himalayan Hill region experiences a harsh winter, with occasional snowfall at places.

== Natural resources ==
Map of mineral deposits in West Bengal

West Bengal stands third in India in terms of mineral production by state, contributing about one-fifth of the total mineral production of the country.

Coal constitutes 99% of the minerals extracted in West Bengal. West Bengal is the third largest state for coal production, accounting for about half of India's total. Coal is extracted from about 228 mines in the Raniganj and Asansol region of Bardhaman district. High grade bituminous coal is mined at Raniganj, Dishergarh, Santaldih, Kulti, Barakar, Ghushik, and Kajora. Coalfields stretch over an area of about 1,550 km^{2} (598 sq mi). The coalfields of Raniganj support the Asansol-Durgapur industrial belt by providing fuel to the industries as well as generation of thermal power. Lignite mined in Darjeeling is used to make briquettes. Coal deposits are also found along the Ajoy river in Birbhum district.

Fireclay and china clay are also mined. West Bengal ranks next to Bihar and Madhya Pradesh in production of fireclay. Most of this mineral is extracted in the Raniganj region, along with a small quantity extracted from Birbhum and Purulia. In 1993–94, 124,000 metric tons of fireclay were produced in West Bengal. China clay—used in the pottery, paper, textile, rubber, and paint industries—is unearthed at Mohammad Bazar in Birbhum and Mejia in Bankura. The rest of the production comes from Purulia, Bardhaman, Darjeeling, and Jalpaiguri.

Limestone, copper, iron ore, wolframite, manganese, and dolomite are also mined in small quantities. Limestone—used in the cement industry—is mined in Bankura, Purulia, Darjeeling, and Jalpaiguri. There are copper mines in Jalpaiguri and Darjeeling. Small quantities of low-quality iron ore are mined in Bardhaman, Purulia, Birbhum, and Darjeeling. There is manganese in the Jhargram region of Paschim Medinipur, Purulia, and Bardhaman. Wolframite is mined at Jhilimili in Bankura. The state's production of dolomite comes from the Dooars region of Jalpaiguri. 38.5 thousand tonnes of dolomite were raised in 1993–94.

There are possible deposits of mineral oil and natural gas in the areas near the Bay of Bengal, in Purba Medinipur, Sundarbans, South 24 Parganas, and North Bengal plains. Research is ongoing in various places to locate natural gas.
