= Chippi =

Chippi may refer to:

- Chhipi, a caste of India
  - Muslim Chhipi
- Chhipi, a river in Sundarbans
- Antonio Barijho, nicknamed Chipi, Argentine footballer
- Zvonko Pantović, nicknamed Čipi, Serbian musician

== See also ==
- Çipi, an Albanian name (see for list of people)
- Chippy (disambiguation)
- Chippie
- Chippis, a municipality in Switzerland
