= List of rivers of Sundarbans =

A list of rivers of the Sundarbans geographic region and ecoregion, located in Bangladesh and in West Bengal state of Eastern India.

The Bangladesh portion has 177 rivers flowing through it to the Bay of Bengal.

== A ==
- Aar-Shibsa
- Agunjala
- Ambare
- Andharmanik River
- Angra Kana
- Arbase
- Arbhanga
- Arijakhali
- Ashashuni

== Ba ==
- Badamtali
- Baganbari
- Bagaura
- Bahar Nadipar
- Baikiri
- Baikuntha Hana
- Bailo
- Baintala
- Bakir Khal
- Baksakhali
- Baluijhanki
- Bando
- Bangabali
- Bara Matla
- Bara Sheola
- Barabare
- Base
- Bayar Nala
- Bayla Koyla

== Be–Bu ==
- Bekardon
- Beri-aada
- Betmuri
- Bharkunde
- Bhayela
- Bhetoipara
- Bhuer Dane
- Bhurbhure
- Bhuter Gang
- Bibir Made
- Bile
- Bogi Chenchane
- Burer Dabur
- Burigolli

== C ==
- Chailtabari
- Chalo Bagi
- Chamta Kamta
- Chandeswar
- Chhachhon Hogla
- Chhadankhali
- Chhaprakhali
- Chhaya Halri
- Chhoto Sheola
- Chhutorkhali
- Chunkuri

== D ==
- Dair Gang
- Dakshinchara
- Dangmari
- Deur Zande
- Dhabjikhali
- Dhakola
- Dhancher Nadi
- Dhanghara
- Dhanibune
- Dhanpati
- Dhonairgang
- Dhukuni
- Dobeki
- Domorkhali
- Dudhmukh
- Dulor Tek

== E–F ==
- Firingi

== G ==
- Gabandara
- Gangasagar
- Garar Nadi
- Ghat Harano
- Gochhba River
- Golbhaksa
- Golkhali
- Gonda
- Gubde

== H ==
- Hadda
- Hansarag
- Harikhali
- Harin China
- Harmahal
- Helar Ber
- Her Matla
- Hunke

== I ==
- Ilishmari

== J ==
- Jalghata
- Javo
- Jhale
- Jhalki
- Jharabagna

== Ka ==
- Kadamtali
- Kaga
- Kaikhali
- Kalagachhe
- Kalaser Bali
- Kalbeyara
- Kali Lai
- Kalida
- Kalikabari
- Kalinde River
- Kanaikhathi
- Kanchikata
- Kapa
- Karpuro
- Katheswar

== Ke–Ku ==
- Kendakhali
- Keorasuti
- Khamurdana
- Khasitana
- Khejurdana
- Khejure Kurule
- Kukumari
- Kultali
- Kunche Mathe
- Kurekhali

== L ==
- Lataberi
- Lathikara
- Loker Chhipi
- Luxmi Pasur

== M ==
- Madar Bare
- Madhukhali
- Mahishe
- Majjot
- Makurni
- Malabaga
- Manasar Ber
- Mandaptala
- Mando
- Manki
- Mara Pasur
- Marichjhapi
- Mathabhanga River
- Mathura
- Mayadi
- Mukta Bangal
- Mukule
- Mulye Meghna

== N ==
- Naobenki
- Narayantali
- Netai Talpanthi
- Netokhali
- Nilkamal

== O–P ==
- Pala
- Panir Khal
- Parshe Mari
- Pashkati
- Patkosta
- Payra Thuni
- Phataker Dane
- Phulbari
- Phuljhuri
- Puspakati

== Q–R ==
- Ragakhali
- Raimangal

== S ==
- Sapkhali
- Sathka
- Satnala
- Sejikhali
- Shakbare-Singa
- Shakbhate
- Sharankhola
- Singartali
- Sonaipanthi
- Sonarupakhali
- Sumati

== T ==
- Talakpanthi
- Talbare
- Taltakta
- Taltali
- Tekakhali
- Terobenki
- Terokati

== U ==
- Ubde

== V–Z ==
- Zingili

== See also ==
- Sundarbans topics
- For links to wikipedia articles on the rivers, see: Category: Rivers of Bangladesh and Category: Rivers of West Bengal.
