= List of rivers of Nadia =

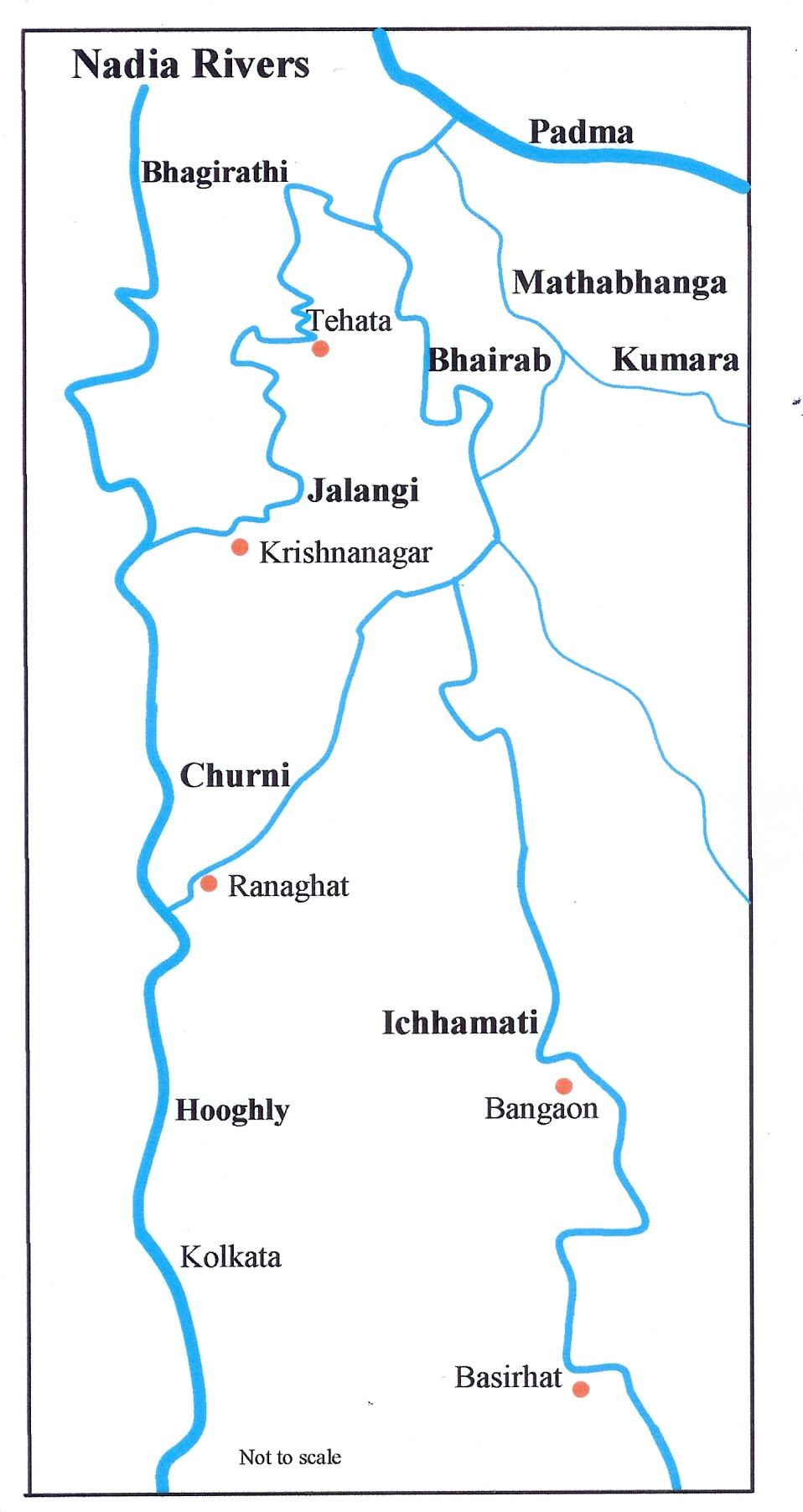
Flow of rivers through Nadia District

This is a list of rivers in the Nadia district, located in the West Bengal state of India.

The district has four important rivers:

- Jalangi River
- Hooghly River
- Churni River
- Bidyadhari River

Other rivers that originate from the Nadia district:

- Mathabhanga River
- Bhairab River
- Ichamati River

Trans-boundary rivers between the Nadia district and Bangladesh:

- Padma River
- Mathabhanga River
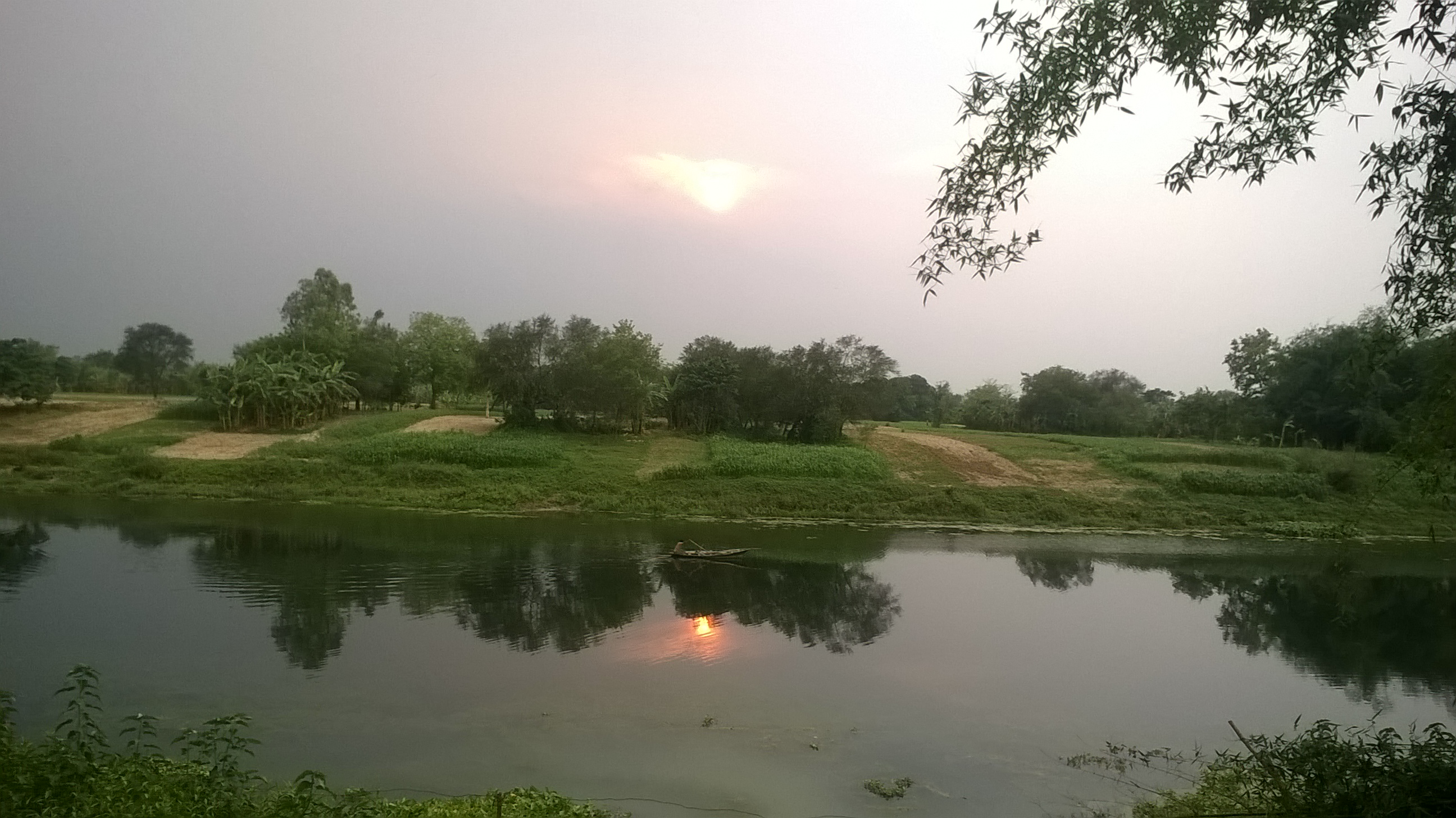
Sunset from bank of Jalangi River near Baliura Village, West Bengal

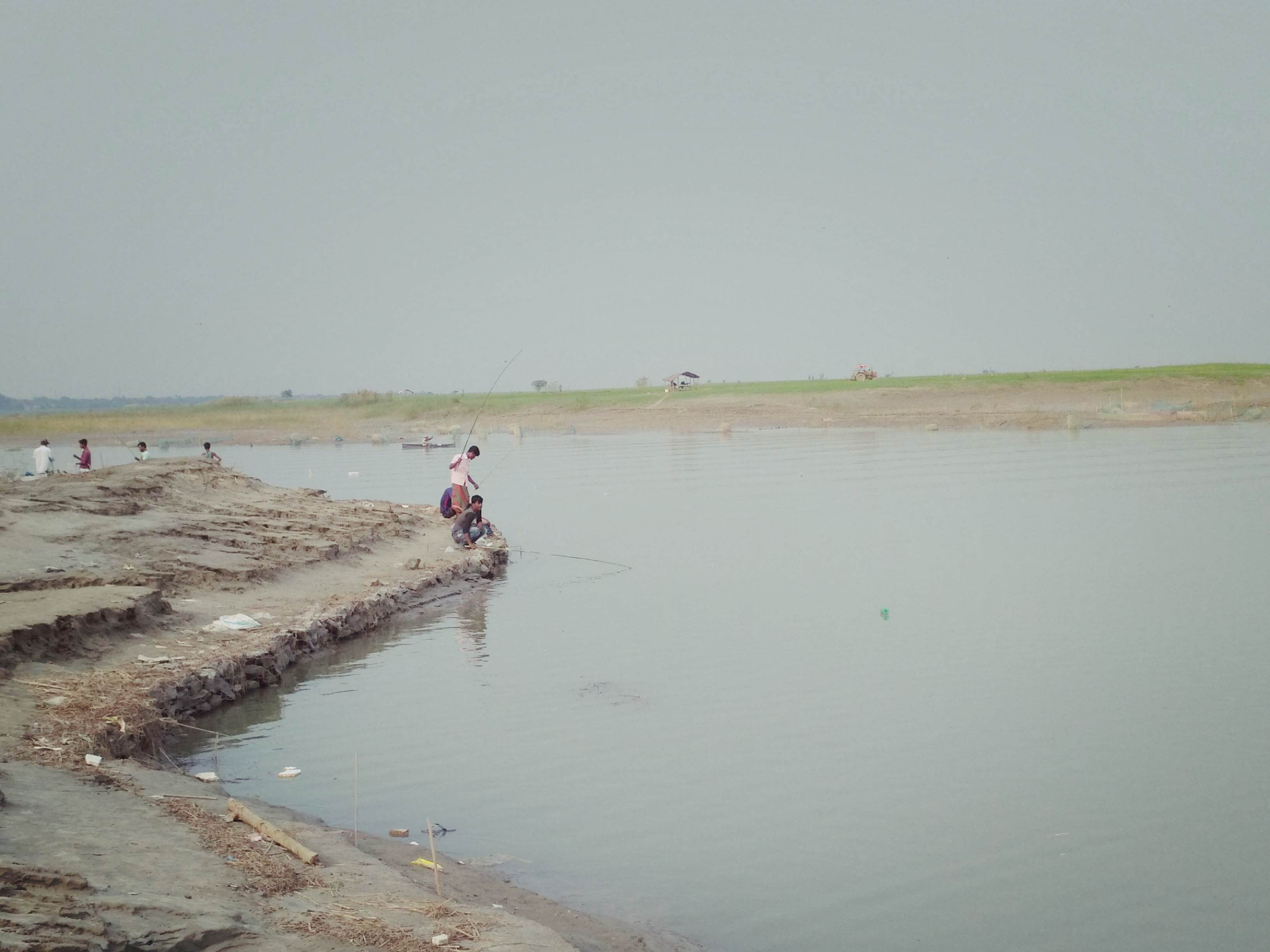
A part of Padma River near Jalangai Village
