= Shyamnagar Upazila =

Shyamnagar শ্যামনগর
- Upazila
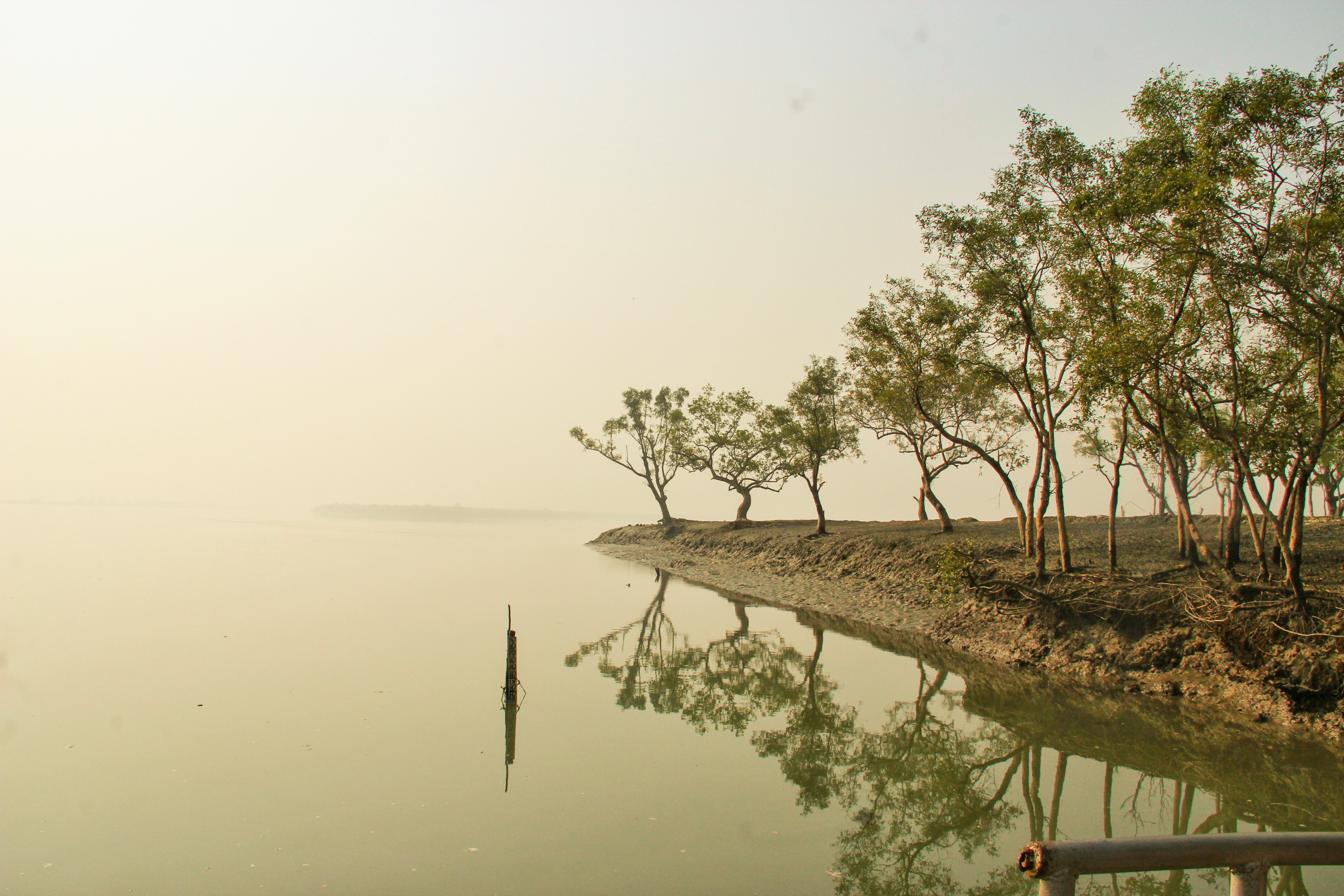
- Sundarbans in Shyamnagar Upazila

- Coordinates: 22°19.8′N 89°6.2′E
- Country: Bangladesh
- Division: Khulna
- District: Satkhira

Area
  - Total: 1,968.23 km^{2} (759.94 sq mi)
  - Rank: 1st in Bangladesh

Population (2022)
  - Total: 365,970
  - Density: 185.94/km^{2} (481.58/sq mi)
- Time zone: UTC+6 (BST)
- Postal code: 9450
- Website: Official Map of Shyamnagar

Shyamnagar Upazila mauza geocode map

Shyamnagar (Bengali: শ্যামনগর) is an upazila of Satkhira District in Khulna Division, Bangladesh.

== Geography ==
Shyamnagar is located at 22.3306°N 89.1028°E. It has a total area of 1968.23 km^{2}.

Shyamnagar Upazila is bordered by Kaliganj (Satkhira) and Assasuni upazilas to the north, the Sundarbans and Bay of Bengal to the south, Koyra and Assasuni upazilas to the east and the Indian state of West Bengal to the west. The main rivers here are: Raymangal, Kalindi, Kobadak, Kholpetua, Arpangachhia, Malancha, Hariabhanga and Chuna. South Talpatti Island at the estuary of the Hariabhanga is notable.

Shyamnagar town consists of 5 mouzas and 13 villages. The area of the town is 10.76 km^{2}. The town has a population of 11,021; 52.36% male and 47.64% female. The population density is 1,024 per km^{2}. Literacy rate among locals is 37.3%. The town has three dakbungalows and a BGB Headquarter.

The average literacy in the entire upazila is 28.1%, comprising 38% among males and 17.4% among females. There are five colleges, 28 high schools, 98 madrasas and 96 government primary schools. The main occupation of the people is agriculture, 32.93% of whom are engaged with this work. The main exports are paddy, jute and shrimp. Shyamnagar is the largest thana of Bangladesh.

== Demographics ==
Religions in Shyamnagar Upazila (2022)
Religion	Percent
Islam	82.88%
Hinduism	16.74%
Other or not stated	0.38%

According to the 2022 Bangladeshi census, Shyamnagar Upazila had 90,087 households and a population of 365,970. 9.55% were under 5 years of age. Shyamnagar had a literacy rate of 74.82%: 78.62% for males and 71.06% for females, and a sex ratio of 99.80 males per 100 males. 78,464 (21.44%) lived in urban areas.

As of the 2011 Census of Bangladesh, Shyamnagar upazila had 72,279 households and a population of 318,254. 67,626 (21.25%) were under 10 years of age. Shyamnagar had an average literacy rate of 48.62%, compared to the national average of 51.8%, and a sex ratio of 1074 females per 1000 males. 17,254 (5.42%) of the population lived in urban areas. Ethnic population was 1,631 (0.51%).

As of the 1991 Bangladesh census, Shyamnagar has a population of 265,004. Males constitute 50.46% of the population, and females 49.54%. This upazila's adult population is 132,516. Shyamnagar has an average literacy rate of 28.2% (7+ years), and the national average of 32.4% literate.

== Administration ==
Shyamnagar thana was upgraded to a upazila in 1982 under Hussain Muhammad Ershad's decentralization programme.

Shyamnagar Upazila is divided into 12 union parishads: Atulia, Bhurulia, Burigoalini, Gabura, Ishwaripur, Kaikhali, Kashimari, Munshiganj, Nurnagar, Padmapukur, Ramjannagar, and Shyamnagar. The union parishads are subdivided into 127 mauzas and 218 villages, there is also a municipality in Shyamnagar.

== See also ==
- Upazilas of Bangladesh
- Districts of Bangladesh
- Divisions of Bangladesh
- Administrative geography of Bangladesh
