= Hariabhanga River =

Tidal river in West Bengal, India

Coordinates: 21.988°N 88.938°E

Location
- Countries: India; Bangladesh
- State: West Bengal, India
- District: Satkhira, Bangladesh

Physical characteristics
- Discharge
  - location: Bay of Bengal

Hariabhanga River (Bengali: হরিয়াভাঙ্গা নদী)(also spelt Haribhanga) is a tidal estuarine river in and around the Sundarbans in North 24 Parganas district in the Indian state of West Bengal, bordering on Satkhira District of Bangladesh.

The Ichamati breaks into several distributaries below Hingalganj the chief of which are the Raimangal, Bidya, Jhilla, Kalindi and Jamuna. It follows the international boundary between India and Bangladesh. The New Moore Island is located at the mouth of the Hariabhanga River.
