= Chippy =

Chippy or Chippie may refer to:

== Arts and entertainment ==
- Chippy (album), an album of songs from a play of the same name.
- Chippy (film), a 2017 Malayalam-language Indian film.
- Chippy (2019 video game), a bullet hell video game developed by Facepunch.
- Chippy (2013 video game), a time management video game produced by Glitchers.

== People and fictional characters ==
- Chippy (nickname)

== Other uses ==
- Mrs Chippy, a cat that accompanied Ernest Shackleton's Imperial Trans-Antarctic Expedition of 1914–17
- Chippy, a brand of corn chips in the Philippines, made by Universal Robina
- Chippy, a slang term for a carpenter, in the List of words having different meanings in American and British English (A–L)
- Fish and chip shop, known colloquially in British English as a chippy

== See also ==
- Chippi (disambiguation)
- Chippie, a German former radio program
- Bertha Hill (1905–1950), American singer and dancer nicknamed "Chippie"
- Potato chip, known colloquially in the north of New Zealand as chippies
- Lowell Chippies, an American minor league baseball team which played in the New England League in 1888
- Zippy Chippy, a racehorse that has lost over 100 races
