= New Moor =

Sandbar island in the Indian Ocean

South Talpatti
- Interactive map of South Talpatti
- Other name: south talapatti Island

Geography
- Location: Bay of Bengal
- Coordinates: 21.6167°N 89.1417°E
- Archipelago: Sundarbans

Administration
- Bangladesh

Demographics
- Population: 0

South Talpatti (Bengali: দক্ষিণ তালপট্টি, romanized: Dokkhin Talpotti), also known as New Moore (Bengali: নতুন মুর, romanized: Notun Moor) and Purbasha Island (Bengali: পূর্বাশা দ্বীপ), was a small uninhabited offshore sandbar island in the Bay of Bengal, off the coast of the Ganges-Brahmaputra delta region. It emerged in the Bay of Bengal in the aftermath of the Bhola cyclone in November 1970, and disappeared around March 2010.

Although the island was uninhabited and there were no permanent settlements or stations located on it, both India and Bangladesh claimed sovereignty over. There has been speculation over the existence of oil and natural gas in the region. The issue of sovereignty was also a part of the larger dispute over the Radcliffe Award methodology of settling the maritime boundary between the two countries. The matter was resolved on 7 July 2014, when the Permanent Court of Arbitration (PCA) delivered a verdict in the "Bay of Bengal maritime boundary arbitration between Bangladesh and India" case.

== Geography ==
The island is believed to have formed through sediment deposition following the 1970 Bhola cyclone. It was located only two kilometres (1.2 miles) from the mouth of the Hariabhanga River. The emergence of the island was discovered by an American satellite in 1974 that showed it to have an area of 2,500 square metres (27,000 sq ft). Later, various remote sensing surveys showed that the island had expanded gradually to an area of about 10,000 square metres (110,000 sq ft) at low tide, including a number of ordinarily submerged shoals. The highest elevation of the island never exceeded two metres (6 feet 7 inches) above sea level.

== Location ==
The island was located in the coastal, shallow Bay of Bengal immediately south of the international border river, the Hariabhanga, flowing between Satkhira district of Bangladesh and the South 24 Parganas district of West Bengal, India, at 21°37′00″N 89°08′30″E. It is now under the waves of the Bay of Bengal.

== Dispute ==
The island was claimed by both Bangladesh and India, although neither country established any permanent settlement there because of the island's geological instability based on silt deposits in a delta which floods every year. India had reportedly hoisted the Indian flag on the island in 1981 and established a temporary base of Border Security Force (BSF), regularly visiting with its Water Wing gunboats.

According to the Radcliffe Award (establishing the East Pakistan and India boundary in 1947), the 'mid-channel flow' principle or thalweg doctrine is generally recognized as the international boundary on river borders between these two countries. The middle line of the mid-channel flow (thalweg) of the Hariabhanga River established the original boundary between the states. Had the island not disappeared, the eventual determination of the island's sovereignty might have had a major impact over the location of the states' maritime boundary further offshore when it is negotiated between Bangladesh and India.

There is no available conclusive evidence as to which side of the island the main channel flowed, and it may have changed over time given shifting silt of the Sundarbans delta. India claimed that a 1981 detailed survey of water depths showed the main and much deeper channel and main flow on the east side of the island, which favored India. Similar survey data was printed on a 1990 British Admiralty chart and reprinted on the 1991 US National Geospatial-Intelligence Agency (NGA) chart number 63330 Edition 9 at 1:300,000 scale.

On the other hand, the Bangladeshi government claimed, as during Ziaur Rahman's visit to India in the late 1970s, that data provided clearly showed the main current flow on the western side of the island's location, thus favoring Bangladesh.

Under some international boundary precedents, the location of the channel in 1947 or at the time of the island's emergence may have been more relevant than its later location. River channels may shift their locations from time to time.

Based on a case filed by the Government of Bangladesh in October 2009 at the Permanent Court of Arbitration the dispute was settled in July 2014 by a final verdict not open to appeal and in favour of Bangladesh. The Permanent Court of Arbitration (PCA) verdict awarded Bangladesh with 19,467 km^{2} (7,516 sq mi) out of 25,000 km^{2} (9,700 sq mi) disputed area with India in the Bay of Bengal but with South Talpatti Island in India's part. The verdict has recognised India's sovereignty over New Moore Island also.

== Disappearance ==
In March 2010, Sugata Hazra of the School of Oceanographic Studies at Jadavpur University, Kolkata, India, said that the island had disappeared and that sea level rise caused by climate change was a factor. He said that sea level rise, changes in monsoonal rain patterns which altered river flows, and land subsidence were all contributing to the inundation of land in the northern Bay of Bengal. Hazra said that other islands in the Indian Sundarbans region are eroding very fast. The United Nations Intergovernmental Panel on Climate Change has estimated that 17 percent of Bangladesh will be submerged underwater by 2050 if sea levels rise by 3.3 feet (1.0 m) due to climate change.

Hazra said that due to global warming, temperatures in the Bay of Bengal area have been rising at an annual rate of 0.4 degrees Celsius and in the 2000-2009 decade, sea water level rose at a rate of 5 millimetres (0.20 in) a year. India is preparing to send a study team to physically assess the situation in the region.

== See also ==
- Indo-Bangladeshi relations
- Indo-Bangladesh enclaves
- List of islands of Bangladesh
- List of islands of India
