= Shyamnagar Municipality =

Municipality in Khulna, Bangladesh

Shyamnagar Municipality শ্যামনগর পৌরসভা
- Municipality

Shyamnagar Municipality (Bengali: শ্যামনগর পৌরসভা, lit. 'Shyamnagar Municipality') is a municipality of Shyamnagar, Khulna, Bangladesh.

== History ==
Shyamnagar Municipality was established between 2022—2023.
