= Burigoalini =

Coordinates: 22.2478°N 89.2403°E

Burigoalini (Bengali: বুড়িগোয়ালিনী) is a village in Burigoalini Union of Shyamnagar Upazila in Satkhira District, Bangladesh that is located on the northwestern fringe of the Sundarbans forest.

The name "Burigoalini" is rather old and refers to a local woman who once had thriving fishponds, rice paddies, and pastures there for milk cows. Now, however, the land is covered with shrimp farms—basically flat water broken up by earthen embankments.
