= Bit, byte, gebissen =

German radio program on computers

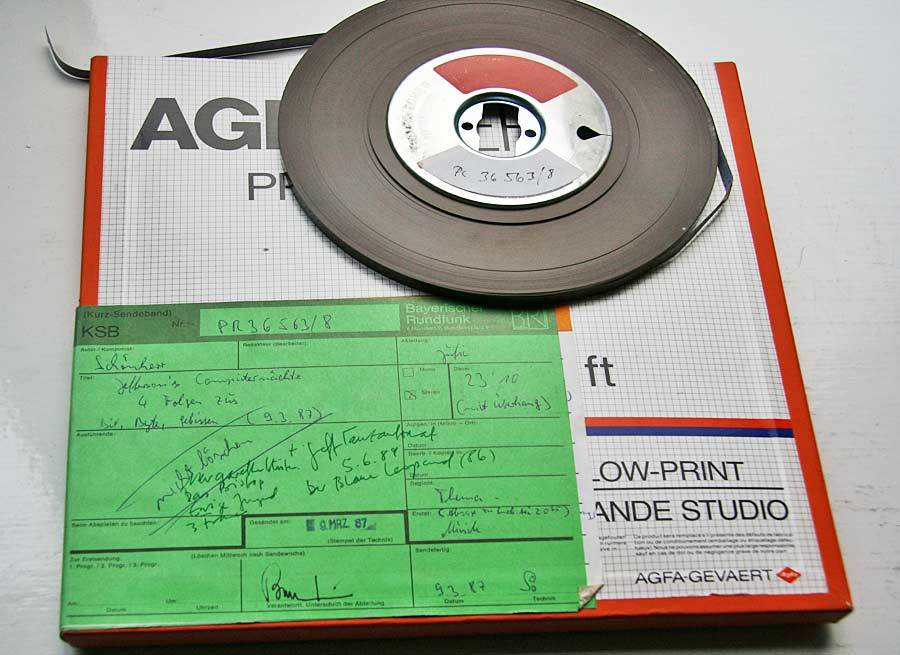
Broadcast tape (March 9, 1987)

Bit, byte, gebissen (German for Bit, Byte, Bitten) was a German radio program. It was the first program on computer topics on public radio in Germany, produced by the Bayerischer Rundfunk (Bavarian Broadcasting). Bit, byte, gebissen was broadcast from October 1985 to September 1993. It ran weekly on Mondays and was half an hour long.

The idea was of the radio program was born out of the boom of home computers and video game consoles starting to fascinate youngsters at the beginning of the 1980s. Another successful program on computer topics for adolescent radio listeners was Chippie from the Hessischer Rundfunk (Hessian Broadcasting), starting in 1990.
