= Padmapukur Union =

Padmapukur Union পদ্মপুকুর ইউনিয়ন
- Union
- Location in Bangladesh
- Coordinates: 22.3457°N 89.2292°E
- Country: Bangladesh
- Division: Khulna Division
- District: Satkhira District
- Upazila: Shyamnagar Upazila

Government
  - Type: Union council
- Time zone: UTC+6 (BST)
- Website: padmapukurup.satkhira.gov.bd

Padmapukur Union (Bengali: পদ্মপুকুর ইউনিয়ন) is a union council in Shyamnagar Upazila of Satkhira District in Khulna Division, Bangladesh.
