= Atulia Union =

Atulia Union আটুলিয়া ইউনিয়ন
- Union
- Location in Bangladesh
- Coordinates: 22.3487°N 89.2028°E
- Country: Bangladesh
- Division: Khulna Division
- District: Satkhira District
- Upazila: Shyamnagar Upazila

Government
  - Type: Union council
- Time zone: UTC+6 (BST)
- Website: atuliaup.satkhira.gov.bd

Atulia Union (Bengali: আটুলিয়া ইউনিয়ন) is a union parishad in Shyamnagar Upazila of Satkhira District, in Khulna Division, Bangladesh.
