= Gabura Union =

Gabura Union গাবুরা ইউনিয়ন
- Union
- Country: Bangladesh
- Division: Khulna Division
- District: Satkhira District
- Upazila: Shyamnagar Upazila

Government
  - Type: Union council
- Time zone: UTC+6 (BST)
- Website: gaburaup.satkhira.gov.bd

Gabura Union (Bengali: গাবুরা ইউনিয়ন) is a union parishad in Shyamnagar Upazila of Satkhira District, in Khulna Division, Bangladesh.
