= Thakuran River =

Coordinates: 21°46′57″N 88°27′13″E

Location
- Country: India
- State: West Bengal

Physical characteristics
- Discharge
  - location: Bay of Bengal

Thakuran River (also called Jamira) is a tidal estuarine river that forms a wide estuary in and around the Sundarbans in South 24 Parganas district in the Indian state of West Bengal.

It originates near Jaynagar Majilpur and has a number of connections with the Saptamukhi and forms the boundary between Mathurapur I and Jaynagar I CD blocks.

The Thakuran system is very wide near the sea face. The major lateral branches of the Thakuran system on the western side are the Kadrakhali Khal, the Damdama Khal, the Moni River, the Pukchara, the Raidighi, the Shibua Gang, the Pakhirali Khal, and the Ross Creek,.The link channel on the eastern side are mostly meander loops, such as the Bainchapi Khal, the Gura Khal, the Kaikalmari-Ajmalmari-Suia River, the Dulibhasani Gang, and the Chulkati gang [5]. These loops are interconnected amongst themselves by an intricate mesh of tidal channels.

Parts of the forested area around the Thakuran are protected. They retain their natural mangrove habitat [6]. The area east of the Thakuran falls under the core area of the Sundarbans Tiger Reserve - an area where no access is generally allowed to casual bird-watchers or tourists [6].

In certains parts the areas around the Thakuran are protected by embankments, which are at times breached by tidal floods [7].
