= Khong Khola River =

River in West Bengal, India

Location
- Country: India
- State: West Bengal
- District: Darjeeling
- City: Darjeeling

Physical characteristics
- Source
  - location: Darjeeling, West Bengal, India
- Mouth
  - location: Darjeeling, West Bengal, India

Khong Khola River is a small perennial river near the town of Darjeeling, in the Indian state of West Bengal.

== Water supply projects ==
During the dry season when the water supply of Darjeeling from Senchal Lake becomes short, water is often pumped from Khong Khola to the town. In 2002, the Darjeeling Municipality submitted proposals for four drinking water projects to the state government. These proposals involve construction of water reservoirs, as follows: A Sindhap ground reservoir at an estimated cost of Rs 6.6 million; a Rungdung Khola water project at an estimated cost of Rs 46 million; a Khong Khola water project at estimated cost of Rs 2 million, and a Senchal Lake water reservoir at an estimated cost of Rs 14 million.

== Drinking-water problem in Darjeeling ==
Natural springs in the Senchal Range provide most of Darjeeling's water supply. Water collected is routed through stone conduits to two lakes that were constructed in 1910 and 1932, from where it is piped to the town after purification at the Jorebungalow filtration plant.

However, there is a steadily widening gap between water supply and demand; just over 50% of the town's households are connected to the municipal water supply system. Various efforts made to augment the water supply, including the construction of a third storage reservoir in 1984, have failed to yield desired results.
