= Çipi =

Çipi is an Albanian surname. Notable people with the surname include:

- Geri Çipi (born 1976), Albanian football defender
- Kreshnik Çipi (born 1958), Albanian football player and politician

== See also ==
- Čipi, nickname of Zvonko Pantović
