= Gosaba River =

Location
- Country: India
- State: West Bengal

Physical characteristics
- Discharge
  - location: Bay of Bengal

Gosaba River is a tidal estuarine river in and around the Sundarbans in South 24 Parganas district in the Indian state of West Bengal.

The Gosaba River, formed by the confluence of the Raimangal and the Matla rivers, has a broad estuary to the sea (Bay of Bengal).
