= Kalindi River =

Coordinates: 22°18′45″N 88°58′42″E

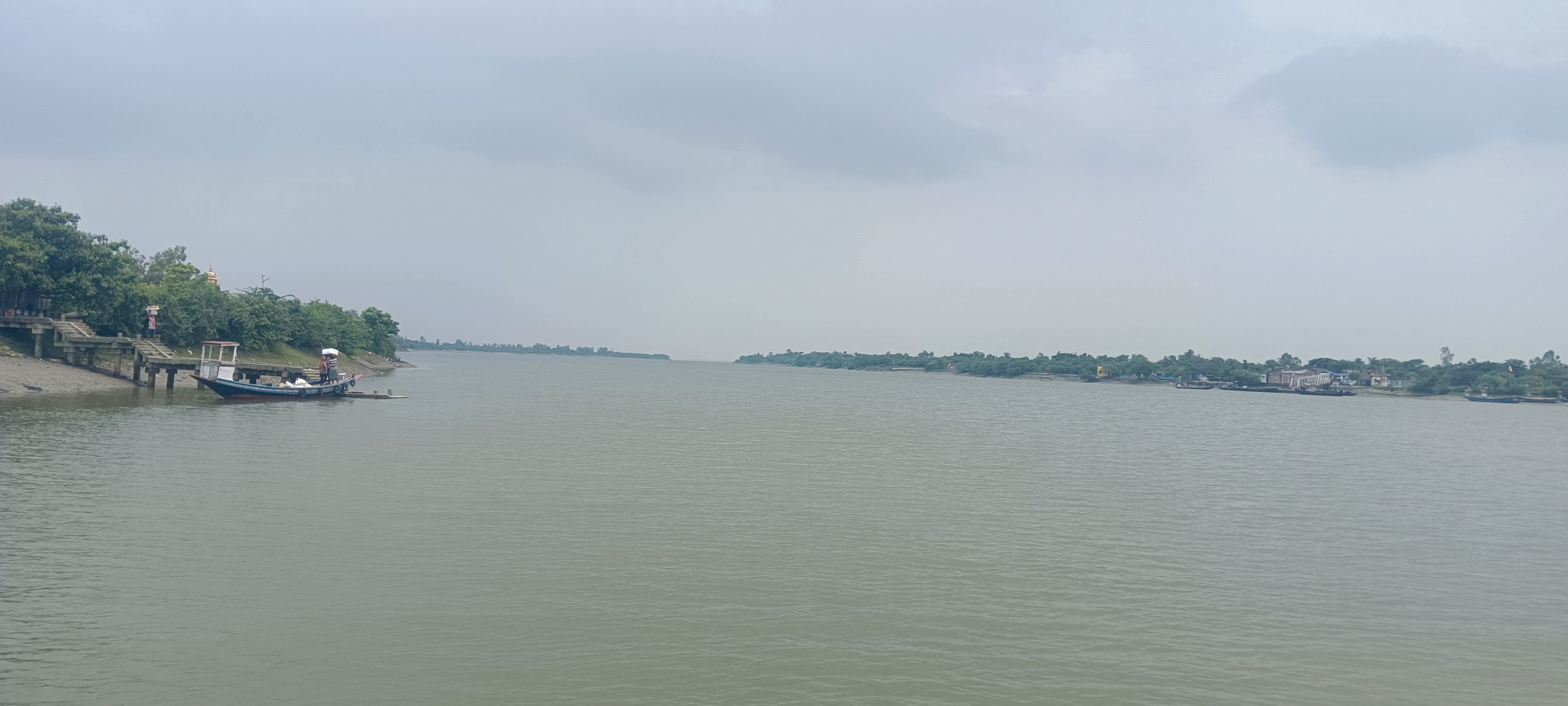
- Kalindi River at Sandeshkhali

Location
- Countries: India and Bangladesh
- State: West Bengal
- District: Satkhira

Physical characteristics
- Discharge
  - location: Bay of Bengal

Kalindi River (Bengali: কালিন্দী নদী) is a tidal estuarine river in and around the Sundarbans in North 24 Parganas district in the Indian state of West Bengal, bordering on Satkhira District of Bangladesh.

The Ichamati breaks up into several distributaries below Hingalganj the chief of which are the Raimangal, Bidya, Jhilla, Kalindi and Jamuna. These fan out into wide estuaries in the Sundarbans.
