= Chippie =

German radio program on computers

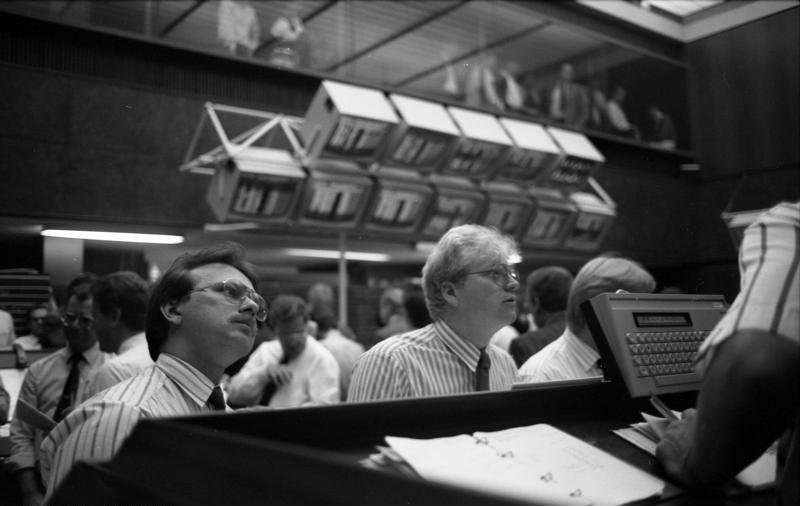
“Computer and Money” was one of the topics in Chippie (Frankfurt Stock Exchange, 1988).

Chippie (hr2-Computermagazin) was a German radio program. It was one of the first programs on computer topics, produced by the Hessischer Rundfunk (Hessian Broadcasting).

== History ==
Chippie started in 1990. At first it was broadcast together with the youth magazine Radio unfrisiert, who won the Civis media prize that year. Later it got its own one-hour slot. The show was hosted by Claudia Bultje and Patrick Conley. Topics on the program were, for example: "Computer in Theater, Opera and Rock Concert" (2 May 1992), "Computer and Money" (5 September 1992), "Computers and Sex" (24 October 1992) and "Data Networks" (2 July 1994).

The first computer magazine in German radio was Bit, byte, gebissen (BR, 1985). Today well-known programs are the Chaosradio (RBB) and Matrix (ORF).
