= Mathabhanga River =

River in India and Bangladesh

Coordinates: 24.0667°N 88.8000°E

Mathabhanga River (Bengali: মাথাভাঙ্গা নদী, romanized: Māthābhāṅgā Nadī) is a transboundary river in India and Bangladesh.

== History ==
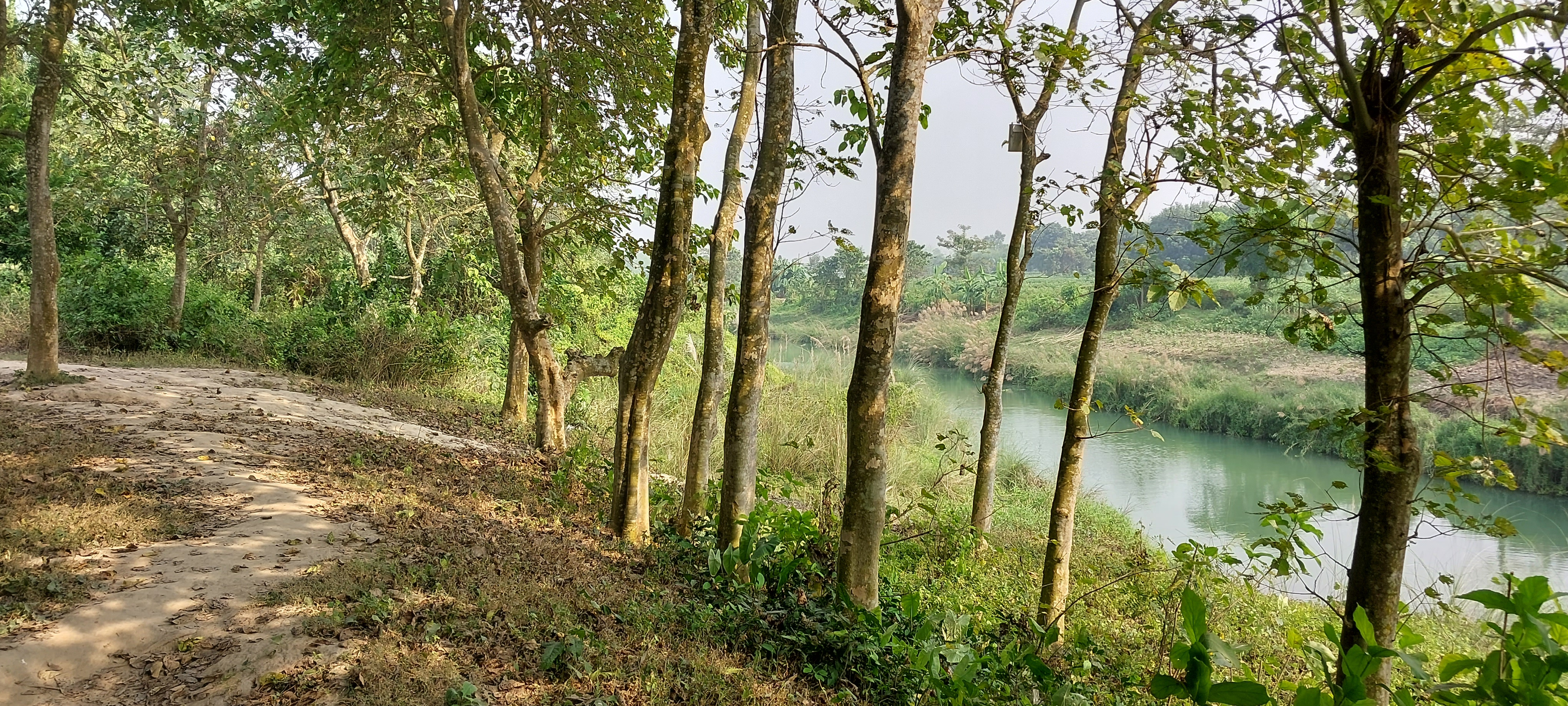
Mathabhanga River near Shikarpur, in Nadia district

The Mathabhanga or Hauli, whose lower reach is called the Haulia, leaves the Padma about ten miles below the point where the Jalangi departs from it.
It flows first in a southeasterly direction as far as Hatboalia village, where it bifurcates one branch, which is thereafter known as the Kumar or Pangasi, it then proceeds in the same direction, past Alamdanga, up to the boundary of the district which it forms for a few miles until it passes into Jessore, whilst the other branch pursues a very tortuous course. The general trend of which is to the south, until, after passing Chuadanga it reaches Krishnaganj (in India). There a second bifurcation takes place, the two resulting streams become the Churni River and the Ichamati, and the name of the parent river is lost. It borderline's between India and Bangladesh near Shikarpur, Karimpur. The Mathabhanga is an important river in south western Bangladesh and plays an important role in carrying sweet water from the rainfall through Jalangi to the Sundarbans. The color of the river is green and clear.
