= Saptamukhi River =

Coordinates: 21°36′N 88°19′E

Location
- Country: India
- State: West Bengal
- District: South 24 Parganas

Physical characteristics
- Mouth
  - location: Bay of Bengal
  - elevation: 0 m (0 ft)
- Length: 80 km (50 mi)

Saptamukhi River is a tidal estuarine river in and around the Sundarbans in South 24 Parganas district in the Indian state of West Bengal.

The Saptamukhi originates near Sultanpur and flows between Kulpi and Mathurapur blocks. It has a connection with the Muri Ganga River and Deogra Khal. It falls to the Bay of Bengal with a wide mouth after traversing about 80 kilometres (50 mi).
