= Bidyadhari River =

River in India

Coordinates: 22°08′52″N 88°44′19″E

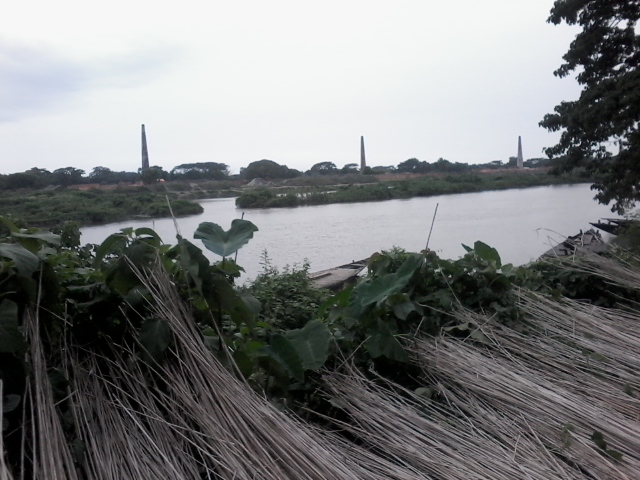
- Bidyadhari river, Shason, North 24 Parganas, West Bengal

Location
- Country: India
- State: West Bengal

Physical characteristics
- Source
  - location: Haringhata
- Mouth
  - location: Raimangal River

Bidyadhari River (also spelt Bidyadhari or simply called Bidya), is a river in the Indian state of West Bengal. It originates near Haringhata in Nadia district and then flows through Deganga, Habra and Barasat areas of North 24 Parganas before joining the Raimangal River in the Sundarbans.

== Overview ==
The river has formed a major navigation route for earlier civilisations. The river port of Chandraketugarh in the third century BCE was on the banks of this river. This river has been the major drainage system of North 24 Parganas and Kolkata.

The Sundarbans area has a network of interconnecting waterways. The larger channels are often a mile wide running in a north-south direction. The Bidyadhari and other such channels now carry little freshwater as they are mostly cut off from the Ganges, the main source of fresh water. As a result of the subsidence of the Bengal Basin and a gradual eastward tilting of the overlying crust the Hooghly-Bhagirathi channels have progressively shifted eastwards since the seventeenth century.

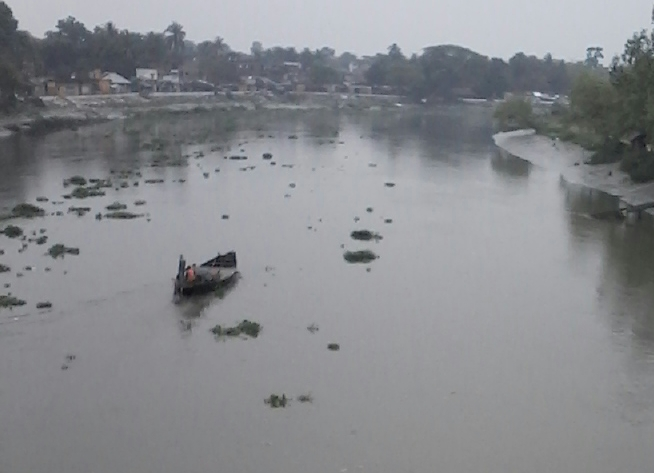
Bidyadhari River, Haroa, Basirhat
