= Ichamati River =

River flowing through India and Bangladesh

Coordinates: 22.627°N 88.933°E

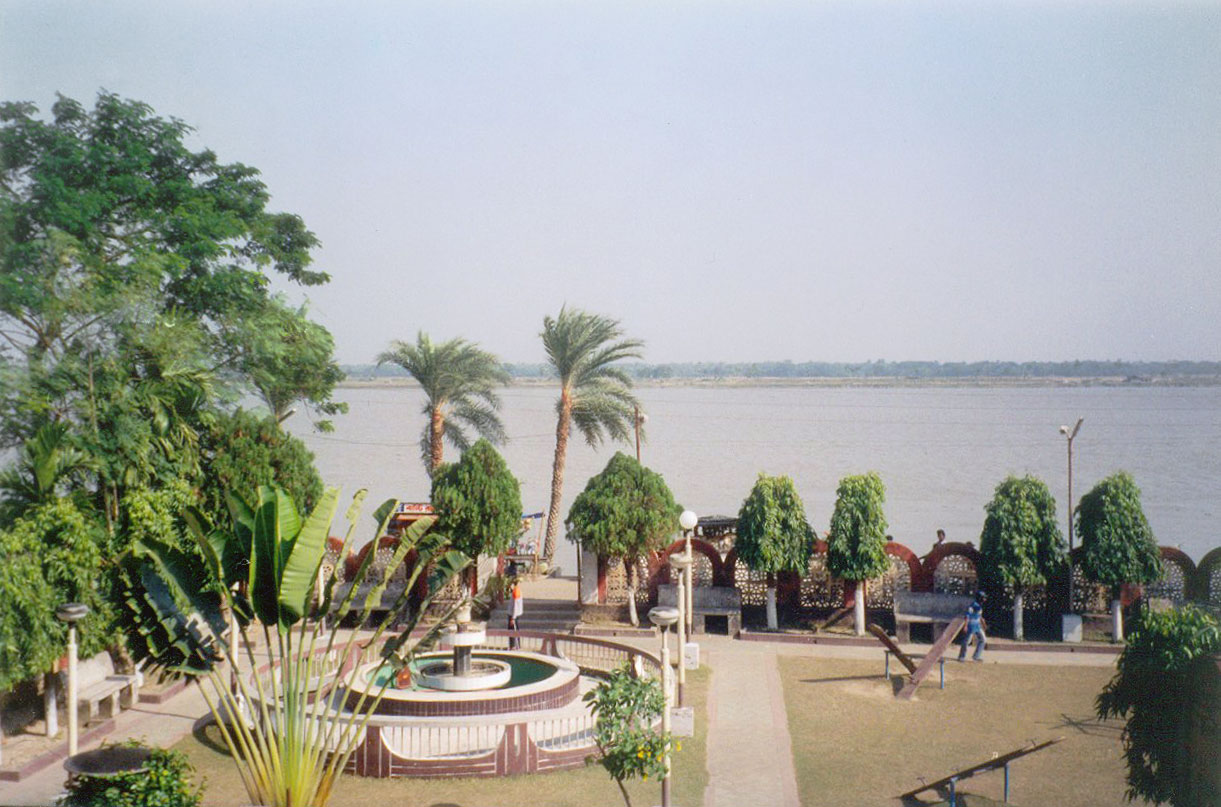
- View from Taki Guest House. Bangladesh is visible on the far bank of Ichamati River.

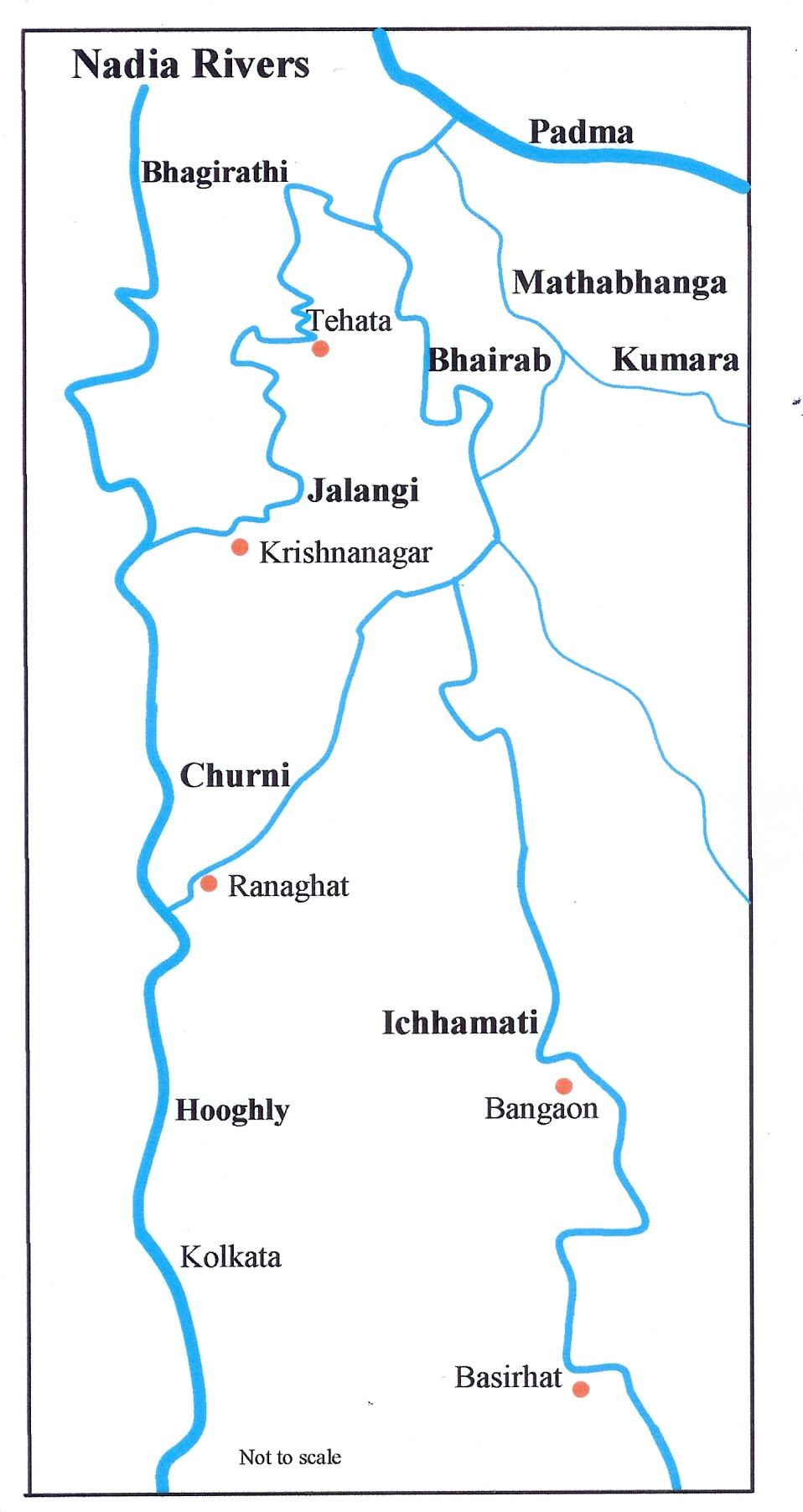
- The lower Ichamati channel flows criss-cross through India and Bangladesh

Location
- Countries: Bangladesh and India
- Cites: Basirhat, Bongaon

Physical characteristics
- Length: 208 kilometres (129 mi)
- Basin size: 3,376 km^{2} (1,303 mi^{2})

Ichamati River (Bengali: ইছামতী নদী) (also spelt Ichhamati), is a trans-boundary river which flows through India and Bangladesh and also forms part of the boundary between the two countries. The river is facing siltation leading to thin flow of water in the dry season and floods in the rainy season. Experts are considering remedial measures and the situation is being discussed between the governments of India and Bangladesh.

== Ichamati flow ==
Ichamati River is now in three parts: (1) The longer part flows from the Mathabhanga River, a distributary of the Padma, and after flowing for 208 kilometres (129 mi) joins the Kalindi River near Hasnabad in North 24 Parganas and Debhata in Satkhira District. (2) Once the main river west of Dhaka and (3) Ichamati of Dinajpur. Rennel's map of 1764–66, shows the last two rivers as one. The second river marked above originates south of Jafarganj opposite to the mouth of the Hoorsagar near Nathpur factory and runs towards Joginighat in Munshiganj.

== Lower Ichamati ==
The Mathabhanga River originates from the right bank of the Padma, at Munshiganj in Kushtia District in Bangladesh. It bifurcates near Majidia in Nadia District in India, creating two rivers, Ichamati and Churni. After traversing a length of 19.5 kilometres (12.1 mi) in India, the Ichamati enters Bangladesh near Mubarakpur. It flows for 35.5 kilometres (22.1 mi) in Bangladesh and again enters India at Habaspur Village near Duttaphulia in Nadia district. It forms the international border between India and Bangladesh for 21 kilometres (13 mi) from Angrail to Kalanchi, and again from Goalpara to the Kalindi-Raimangal outfall into the Bay of Bengal.

The Bhairab once flowed from the Ganges, across the present beds of the Jalangi, and further eastwards towards Faridpur. The Bhairab is no more a very active river. The Mathabhanga is a younger stream than Jalangi and it was not until very recently that the river completed its junction with the Hooghly by adopting the River Churni (now its lower reaches) for its main course. Earlier most of the water of the Mathabhanga ran off to the east down the Kumara, Chitra, Coboduk (Bhairab), and Ichamati, but all these escape routes have been shut off, except a small amount for the Ichamati. The point to note is that while earlier the rivers in the region flowed in a south-easterly direction, but later some force pulled the Jalangi and the Mathabhanga in a south-westerly direction. The inference is that it occurred because of a local subsidence, which was active for some period prior to 1750 and which has since become inactive.

=== River bed raised ===
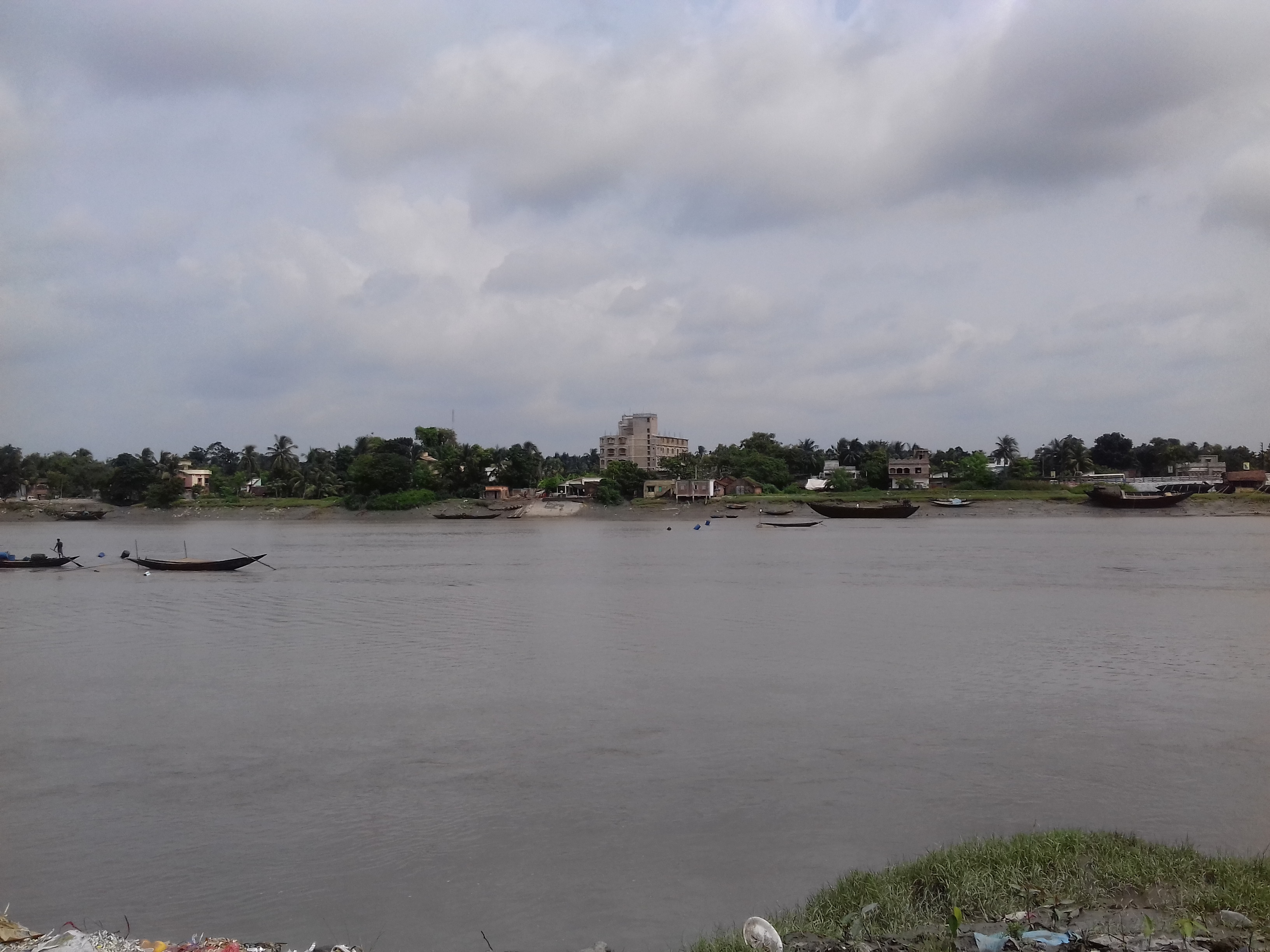
Ichamati river at Basirhat city

While the bed of the Ichamati river is 4.3 metres (14 ft) higher than that of the Mathabhanga, that of the Churni is lower than Mathabhanga by 15 centimetres (6 in). During the lean period, the level of water in the Mathabhanga is higher than that of the Padma. As a result, no water enters the Ichamati during the dry season. One of the causes of silting of the river was construction of guard wall for railway over bridge. The river beds in the area need to be excavated to facilitate the flow of water during the lean season. Since this is required to be done both in India and Bangladesh, there is need for accord on this point. The matter has been discussed at the ministerial level, the area surveyed to have better idea of the problems of the people in the affected area, and decisive action is expected in the near future.

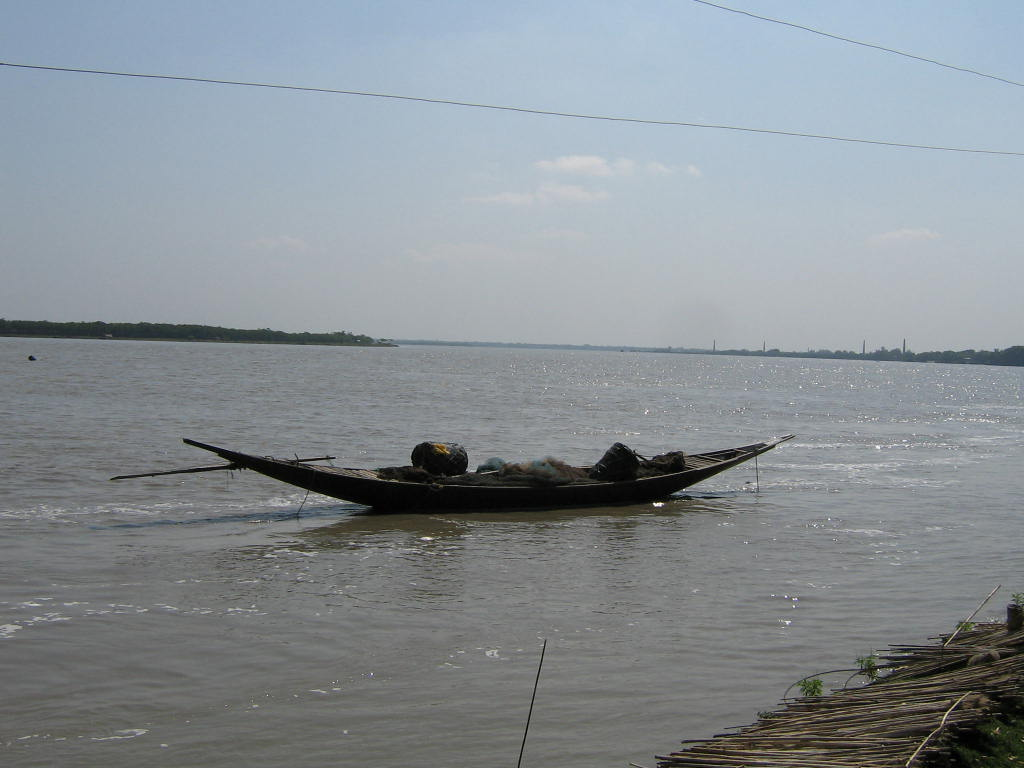
The Ichamati from Taki-Saidpur

The ashes of so many burnt bodies have been carried by the river to the blue ocean illimitable. The man who expected so much return from his plantain trees on the southern side of that green, and at the bend of the river put bamboo traps to catch fish, is lying today on the bank of the Ichhamati – only his white bones remain, bleached by sunrays. So many young girls came to the river for water, and as they grow old their footprints are lost… during ceremonies of marriage, of making the child taste rice for the first time and of investing with the holy thread, the festivals of Durgpuja, Luxmipuja… those ladies of so many families pass away unnoticed… who knows when death may embrace us? Like a deceptive guide Death accompanies us at every bend of life and then suddenly, mysteriously he reveals his real character to a child, to an old man, perhaps… one listens to the music of eternity when one spots the old flowers or smells the pungent fragrance of herbal plants in Autumn. Some can visualise and dream the unlimitable unknown eternity in the image of the Ichhamati river during the turbulent rainy season.

— Bibhutibhushan Bandopadhyay

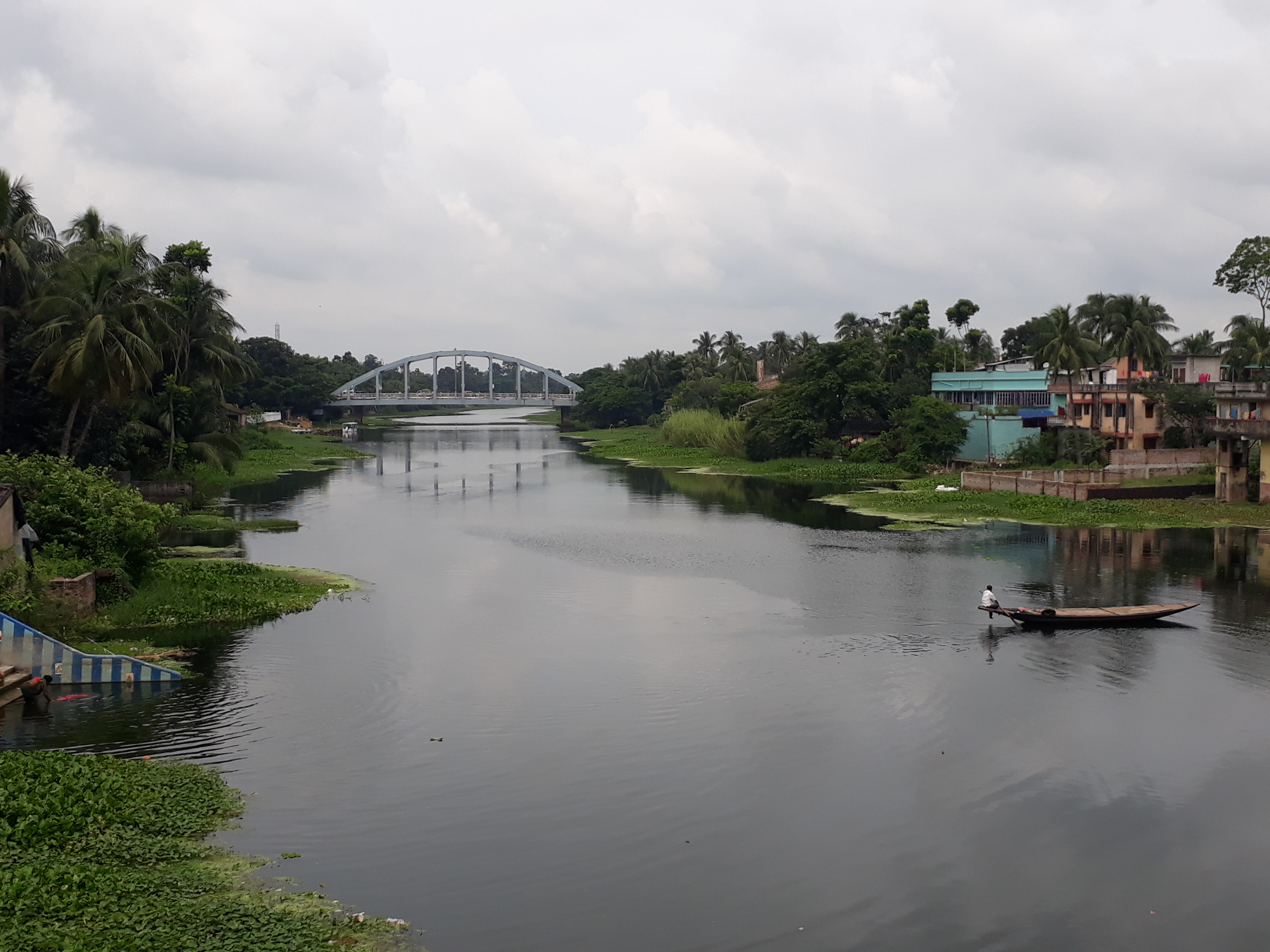
Ichamati River at Bangaon town

The river zone also faces the problem of industrial pollution and forcible occupation of land by people. Arresting environmental hazards resulting from lack of sanitation facilities, encroachment, groundwater contamination like arsenic pollution, destruction of aquatic flora, fauna are some of the burning problem of the areas that needs to be tackled through participatory mechanism.

== Naming ==
On 1 August 2022, the Chief Minister of West Bengal, Mamata Banerjee announced the creation of a new district Ichamati district which is named after this river. The district will be formed by bifurcating the North 24 Parganas district consisting of the area of Bangaon subdivision.
