= Raimangal River =

Coordinates: 22°15′31″N 88°57′09″E

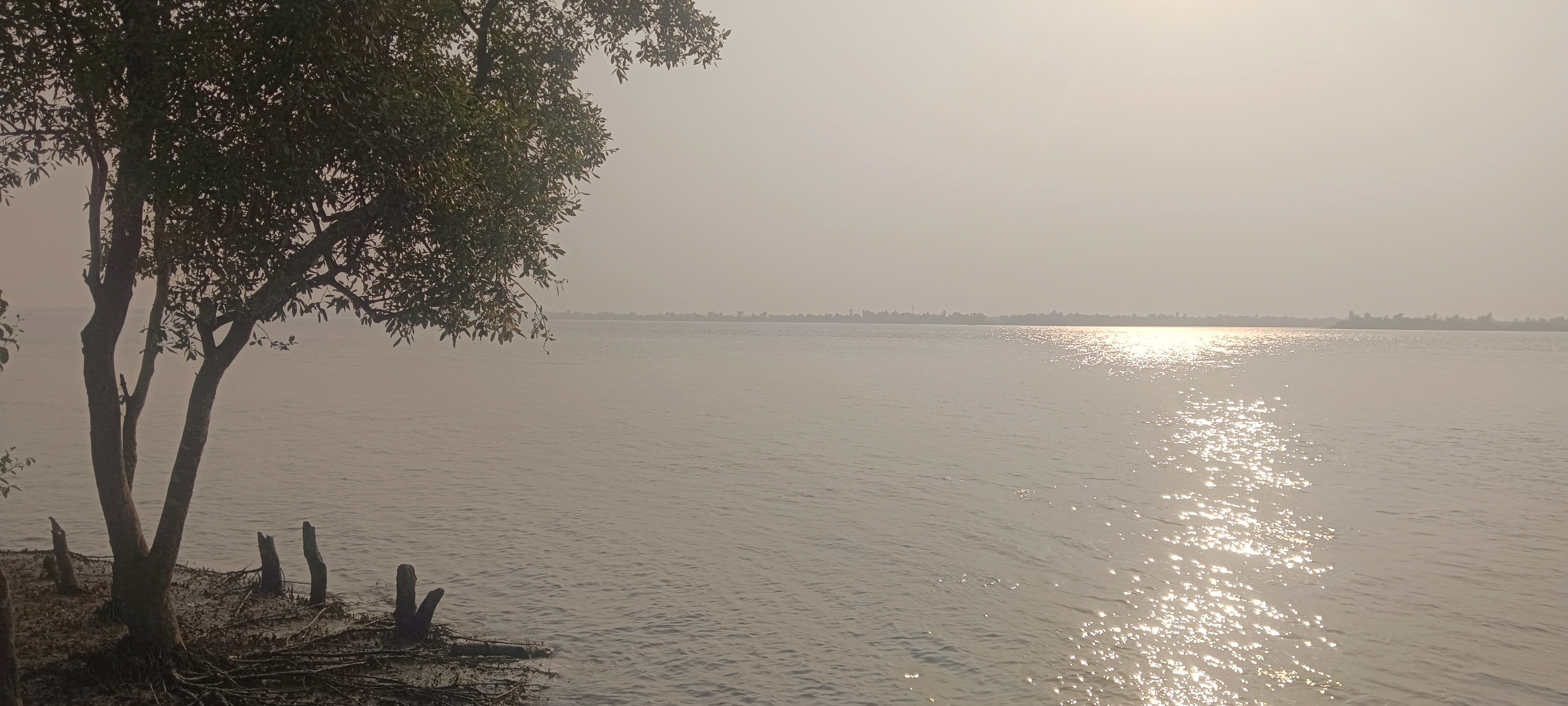
- Raimangal River at Hemnagar

Location
- Country: India, Bangladesh
- State: West Bengal

Physical characteristics
- Discharge
  - location: Bay of Bengal

Raimangal River (Bengali: রায়মঙ্গল নদী) is a tidal estuarine river in and around the Sundarbans in South 24 Parganas district in the Indian state of West Bengal and Satkhira District in Bangladesh.

The Ichamati breaks up into several distributaries below Hingalganj the chief of which are the Raimangal, Bidya, Jhilla, Kalindi and Jamuna. These fan out into wide estuaries in the Sundarbans. It forms the international boundary between India and Bangladesh for some distance.
