= Leather Liton =

Bangladeshi gangster based in Dhaka

Leather Liton, born Harunur Rashid, is a Bangladeshi gangster based in Dhaka.

== Career ==
On 21 December 2001, Liton was arrested with a gun near Jatiya Sangsad Bhaban. He went into hiding after securing bail.

Judge Mohammad Rezaul Islam sentenced Liton to 28 years imprisonment in absentia on 24 June 2009.

In 2019, Liton was alleged to be in control of the narcotics trade in Hazaribagh along with Khandaker Naim Ahmed Titon.

In May 2024, Liton was acquitted in the actor Sohel Chowdhury murder case. Sohel Chowdhury was murdered in 1998. Bangladesh Police filed the murder case against Liton and others including Aziz Mohammad Bhai and Sanjidul Islam Emon.

In April 2025, the National Independent Investigation Commission on the 2009 BDR carnage issued a public notice asking Liton to appear before the commission. Aside from him, the commission had called 17 other people including former Prime Minister Sheikh Hasina, Major General Tarique Ahmed Siddique, Dhaka South Mayor Sheikh Fazle Noor Taposh, members of parliament AFM Bahauddin Nasim, Anisul Islam Mahmud, HM Golam Reza, Jahangir Kabir Nanak, Nurul Islam, Sheikh Fazlul Karim Selim, and Waresat Hussain Belal. The commission also summoned former Rapid Action Battalion director general Hasan Mahmud Khandoker, former Additional Inspector General of Police Monirul Islam, former ward commissioner Suraiya Begum, and journalists Munni Saha, JI Mamun and Monjurul Ahsan Bulbul.

== Personal life ==
Liton's father was Torab Ali, president of Ward-48 unit of Awami League and accused in the 2009 Bangladesh Rifles mutiny case. His father was the President of the Retired Bangladesh Rifles Members' Welfare Association. Torab Ali and Bangladesh Nationalist Party member of parliament Nasiruddin Ahmed Pintu were the only two politicians were convicted the Bangladesh Rifles mutiny case.
