= SM Ataul Haque =

Bangladeshi politician

Member of the Bangladesh Parliament for Satkhira-4
- In office 10 January 2024 – 5 August 2024
- Preceded by: S. M. Jaglul Hayder
- Succeeded by: Gazi Nazrul Islam

Personal details
- Born: 27 June 1974 (age 52)
- Party: Awami League
- Occupation: Politician

SM Ataul Haque (born 27 June 1974) is a Bangladeshi politician. He is a former Jatiya Sangsad member representing the Satkhira-4 constituency served in 2024.

== Early life ==
SM Ataul Haque was born in Shyamnagar Upazila of Satkhira District. His father is the then former Member of Parliament of Satkhira-5 Constituency and District Awami League President AK Fazlul Haque.

Haque was arrested Baridhara DOHS on 19 November 2026 by the Special Response Battalion.
