= List of unresolved murder cases in Bangladesh =

This is a list of unresolved murder cases of Bangladesh.

== 1970s ==
- On 20 December 1971, Kader Siddique was involved in torturing, humiliating, and beyneting four prisoners of war to death.
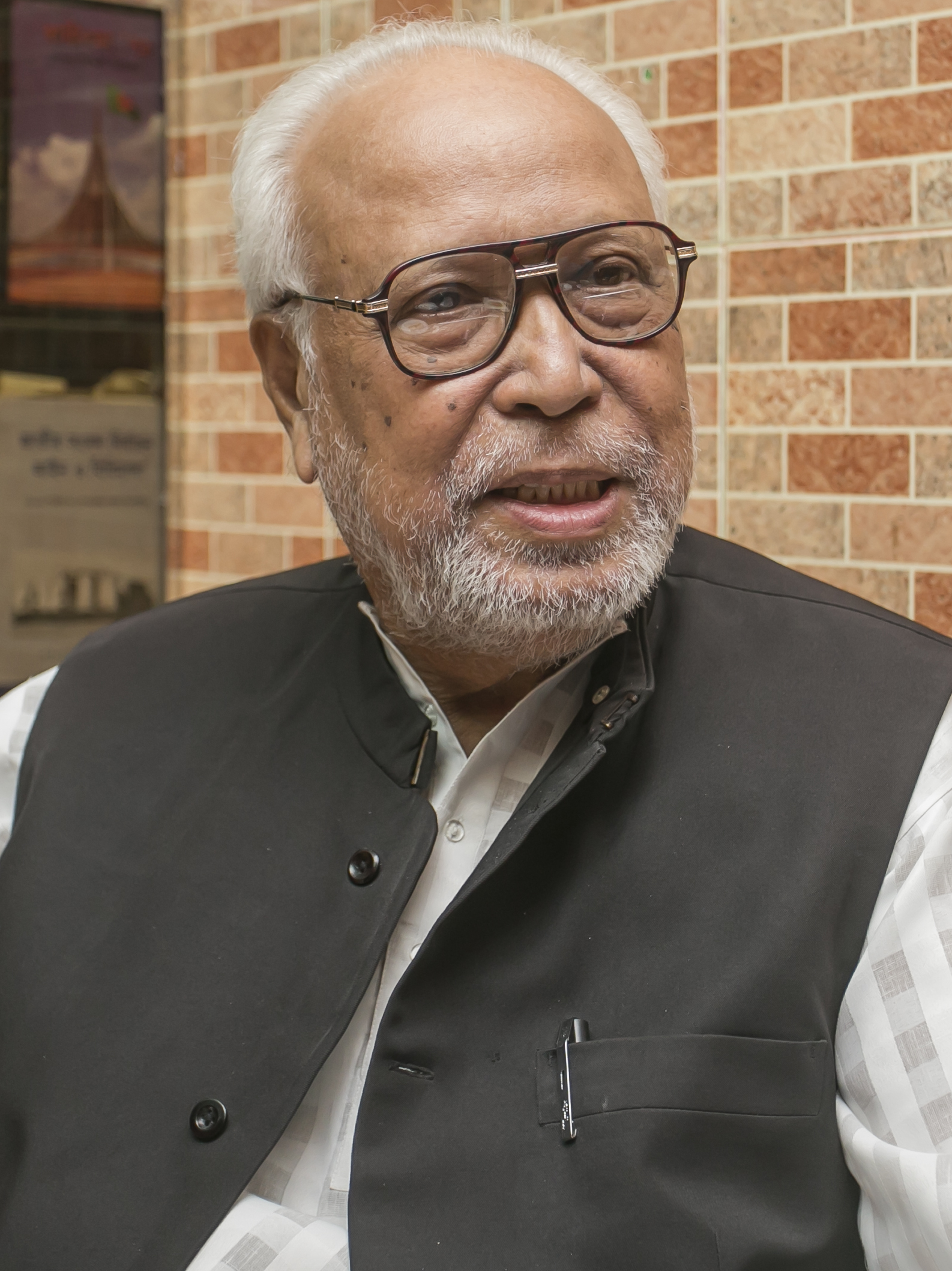
  Kader Siddique
- On 2 January 1975, Siraj Sikder was killed in the custody of police on their way to Rakkhi Bahini Camp in Savar, Dhaka.

== 1980s ==
- On 1 June 1981, Major General Muhammad Abul Manzoor was killed in Chittagong. Former president of Bangladesh Hussain Muhammad Ershad is the main accused of the murder case.
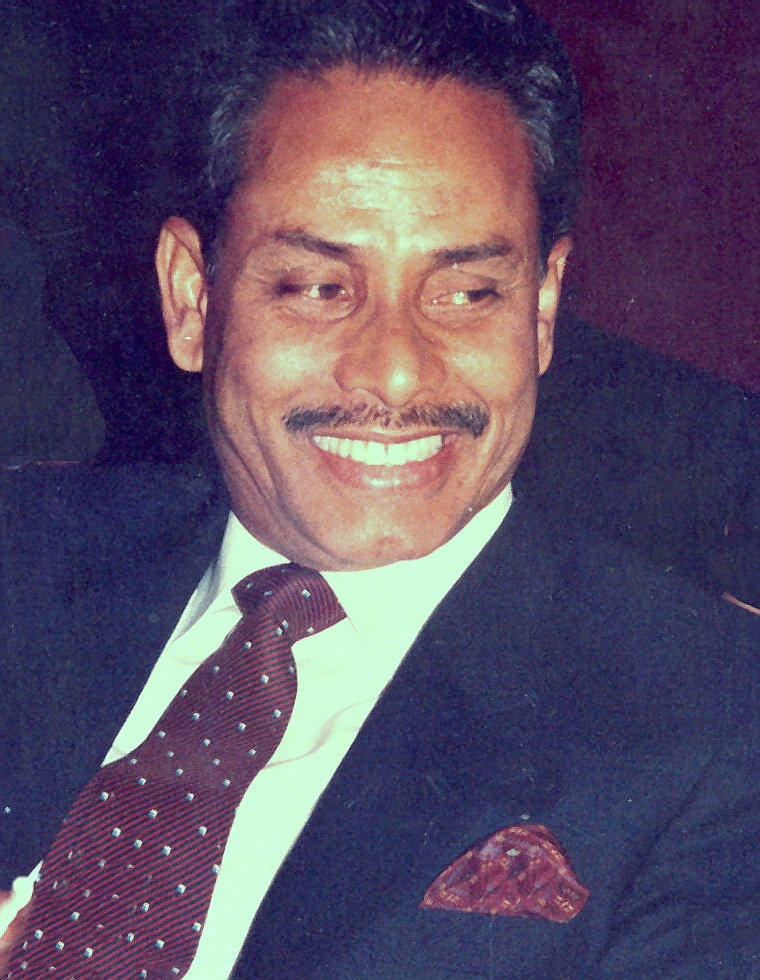
  Hussain Muhammad Ershad, the suspect of the Muhammad Abul Manzoor murder

== 1990s ==
- On 6 September 1996, a prominent Bangladeshi film actor Salman Shah was found dead in his apartment. The case is recently revived by the Dhaka Court. His wife Samira Haque and businessman Aziz Mohammad Bhai is allegedly involved in the murder.
- On 18 December 1998, a prominent Bangladeshi film actor Sohel Chowdhury was shot dead in front of a club in Banani, Dhaka. No trial was made even after 17 years.

== 2000s ==
- On 27 January 2005, Minister of Finance Shah AMS Kibria and his nephew Shah Manzur Huda was killed in a grenade attack which is yet to be solved after twelve years.
- On 28 October 2006, four activists of Jamaaat-e-Islami were beaten to death by Awami League activists. That incident is famously known as "logi boitha killing".

== 2010s ==
- On 11 February 2012, prominent TV journalist couple Sagar Sarowar and Meherun Runi were murdered in their apartment which is still unresolved.
- On 8 March 2013, an A-level student named Tanvir Muhammad Taqi was found murdered and floating in Shitalakshya River of Narayanganj. It is widely believed that the Awami League MP of Narayanganj Shamim Osman was instrumental behind this murder. No case has been taken by police, no investigation done, and nobody was charged.
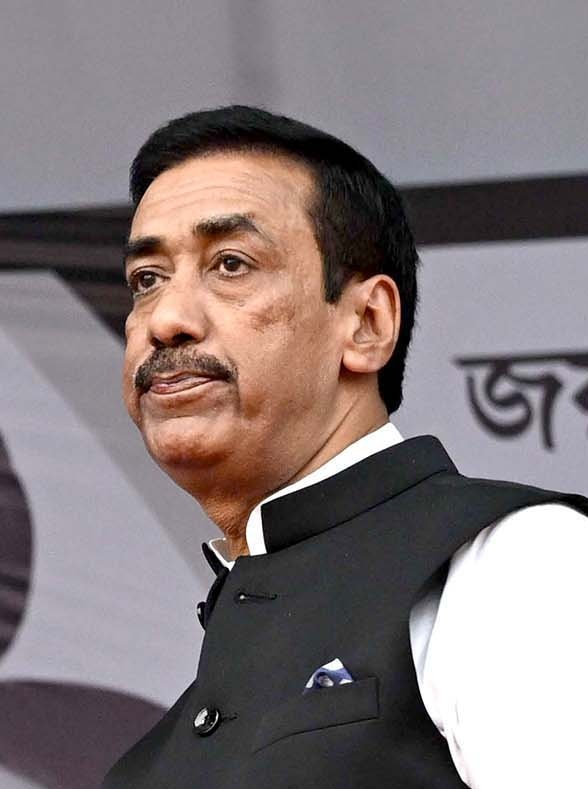
  Shamim Osman
- On 20 May 2014, Ekramul Haque, Chairman of Fulgazi Upazila was shot and burnt alive. Joynal Hazari, an MP of Awami League from Feni District of Bangladesh is believed to be involved in the murder.
- On 25 August 2014, cleric and TV host Nurul Islam Farooqi was killed by unknown assailants in his office.
- On 23 April 2016, A. F. M. Rezaul Karim Siddique, a professor of department of English in Rajshahi University was murdered.
- On 29 March 2017, Raudha Athif, a Maldivian MBBS 2nd year medical student in Rajshahi was murdered and thrown across the bed in her hostel room in the Islami Bank Medical College at Rajshahi. Raudha Athif (18 May 1996 – 29 March 2017) was a Vogue model and medical student who was killed in Rajshahi, Bangladesh and her parents claim that she was brutally strangled with a belt and before that she was manually strangulated by hand (throttling).

== See also ==
- List of journalists killed in Bangladesh
- Attacks by Islamic extremists in Bangladesh
