= Mansur Ahmed =

Bangladeshi politician (died 2021)

- মনসুর আহমদ

Member of Parliament for Satkhira-4
- In office 10 July 1986 – 6 December 1987
- Preceded by: Position created
- Succeeded by: M. Mansur Ali
- In office 5 March 1991 – 24 November 1995
- Succeeded by: Wazed Ali biswas

Personal details
- Died: 1 February 2021 (aged 72) Dhaka, Bangladesh
- Party: Bangladesh Awami League

Mansur Ahmed Gazi (died 1 February 2021) was a Bangladesh Awami League politician and a former member of parliament for Satkhira-4.

== Career ==
Ahmed was elected to parliament from Satkhira-4 as a Bangladesh Awami League candidate in 1986 and 1991. He is the president of Satkhira District unit of Bangladesh Awami League.

Ahmed was defeated from Satkhira-4 constituency on 12 June 1996 on the nomination of Bangladesh Awami League.
