= Shahadat Hossain (disambiguation) =

Shahadat Hossain (born 1986) is a Bangladeshi cricketer.

Shahadat Hossain may also refer to:

- Shahadat Hossain (actor) (born 1976), Bangladeshi actor and radio personality
- Shahadat Hossain (cricketer, born 2002), Bangladeshi cricketer
- Shahadat Hossain (Satkhira politician)
- Shahadat Hossain (Chittagong politician)
- Shahadat Hussain, Indian poet
