= Kala Jahangir =

Bangladeshi gangster

Kala Jahangir is a Bangladeshi gangster and a top-listed criminal of the Ministry of Home Affairs. Journalist Aasha Mehreen Amin described him as "most feared gangster Kala Jahangir". He has been described as a "mythical figure". He maintained ties with police and politicians for protection. While there is an Interpol red notice on him, it is believed that he is dead.

== Career ==
Jahangir started criminal activities as a teenager. He came from an educated family. In 2001, the government issued a list of 23 most wanted gangsters which included Jahangir.

Jahangir was a member of the Five-Star Group, which included Picchi Hannan, Dakat Shahid, and Zeesan Ahmed. The group was active in Dhaka in the 1990s and early 2000s. He was active in South Dhaka and Old Dhaka. In 2000, his gang gunned down Humayun Kabir Milon alias Murgi Milon in Old Dhaka Court. His gang gunned down Dhaka City Corporation Ward Commissioner Saidur Rahman Newton on 10 May 2002. The Daily Star reported that his underage followers detained in the Juvenile Development Centre, Tongi, were torturing non-gang affiliated detained teenagers. He was also accused in a case filed following the murder of Shahadat Hossain Sikder, another Ward Commissioner of Dhaka Metropolitan Police.

Former prime minister Sheikh Hasina accused the ruling Bangladesh Nationalist Party of using Jahangir to support its candidate, Mosaddek Ali Falu, the Dhaka-10 by-polls. Judge of the Speedy Trial Tribunal Court-2 of Dhaka Sheikh Jahangir Hossain alleged to the High Court Division that the government was pressuring him to release criminals ahead of the by-election. Jahangir had a case with his court. In June 2004, vice chairman of Bangladesh Jatiya Party Golam Parvez Didar was shot dead in Dhaka, and his family members blamed Jahangir, who had been threatening him for months. In July 2004, former prime minister Sheikh Hasina reported she received a death threat from Jahangir while she was in Istanbul for the D-8 Organization for Economic Cooperation conference. Prime Minister Khaleda Zia responded by calling Hasina delusional. The next month, Hasina was targeted in the 2004 Dhaka grenade attack.

Bangladesh Police arrested Sayeedur Rahman, who pretended to be Kala Jahangir, to extort money from local officials of World Bank. His aid, Nasiruddin Molla alias Gal Kata Nasir, was detained from Khulna by Rapid Action Battalion. In September, his aides Kajem Uddin Bhuiyan alias Bhutto and Mollah Shamim were killed in a gunfight with a joint unit of security forces called Cheetah and Rapid Action Battalion, respectively. Two of his aids were detained in Mirpur in November 2004. Rapid Action Battalion killed his aide, Panu Howladar alias Kanu alias Russell, in a gunfight. Police detained two of his accomplices when they went to collect extortion money from tax commissioners at the commissioner of income taxes in Khulna District.

Indian intelligence allegedly hired Jahangir's gang to attack Indian separatist safehouses inside Bangladesh.

Jahangir was acquitted of the attempted murder case on 16 December 1998 after the persecution failed to produce witnesses. Jahangir was sentenced to death along with nine others, including Killer Abbas, for the murder of Saidur Rahman Newton in May 2006. In 2008 the High Court Division maintained his death sentence for the murder of Advocate Habib Mandol, a leader of the Bangladesh Nationalist Party. The High Court Division reduced his jail sentence to life imprisonment in July 2011.

In October 2007, Jahangir's second-in-command, Habibur Rahman Taj, was detained in Kolkata, India and handed over to the Criminal Investigation Department in Bangladesh.
