= Rezaul Karim Mallick =

Bangladeshi police officer

Rezaul Karim Mallik
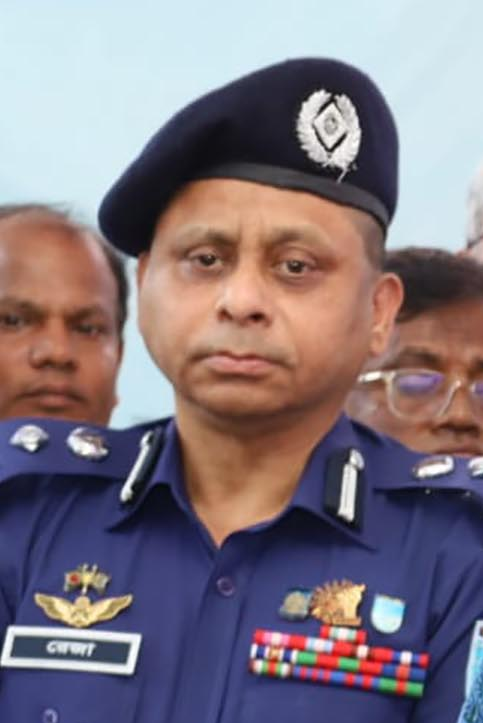
- Mallick in 2025

Chief of Dhaka Range Police
- In office 7 May 2025 – 30 June 2026
- President: Mohammed Shahabuddin
- Preceded by: Md Awolad Hosen

Chief of the Detective Branch, Dhaka Metropolitan Police
- In office 1 September 2024 – 13 April 2025
- Appointed by: Ministry of Home Affairs, Bangladesh
- Preceded by: Moha. Ashrafuzzaman

Personal details
- Education: Police Training Bangladesh Police Academy
- Police career
- Allegiance: Bangladesh
- Branch: Bangladesh Police
- Service years: 1998–2026
- Status: Retired
- Rank: Additional IGP

Rezaul Karim Mallick is a retired Bangladeshi police officer and chief of Dhaka Range Police. He was the former chief of the Detective Branch of the Dhaka Metropolitan Police. He is the former superintendent of police of the Police Bureau of Investigation in Dhaka.

== Early life ==
Mallick joined the Bangladesh Police in 1998 as an officer of the 17th batch of the Bangladesh Civil Service. Mallick was the general secretary of Amra Zia'r Sainik.

== Career ==
Mallick served as the deputy commissioner of the Dhaka Metropolitan Police. He was transferred and appointed superintendent of police of Laxmipur District in January 2007. He was one of a number of police officers who enjoyed patronage of the Bangladesh Nationalist Party government who had ties with the party.

In 2015, Mallick was the superintendent of police at the Bangladesh Police Academy. In March, he was appointed to the Police Bureau of Investigation.

Following the fall of the Sheikh Hasina-led Awami League government, Mallick was appointed head of the Detective Branch of the Dhaka Metropolitan Police in September 2024 by Md. Mainul Islam, commissioner of the Dhaka Metropolitan Police. He detained journalist and Swechchhasebak League leader Sheikh Jamal in October while Mallick was the additional deputy commissioner of the Detective Branch. His unit detained a number of people with ties to the former government, including Mustafa Kamal Uddin, former secretary of the Ministry of Home Affairs, AKM Shahidul Hoque and Chowdhury Abdullah Al-Mamun, former heads of Bangladesh Police, Sadhan Chandra Majumder, former minister of food, Shibli Rubayat Ul Islam, the former chairman of the Bangladesh Securities and Exchange Commission, Md Nazibur Rahman, former secretary, and Mohammad Faruk Khan, former minister of civil aviation and tourism. His unit was also detained EXIM Bank chairman Nazrul Islam Mazumder, former minister of culture Asaduzzaman Noor, former state minister M Mahbub Ali, Additional Deputy Inspector General Mashiur Rahman, former senior secretary Shah Kamal, Hindu Leader Chinmoy Krishna Das, former MP Mahbub Ara Begun Gini, former MP Abdullah Al Islam Jakob and former minister of agriculture Md Abdur Razzaque.

Mallick stated in January 2025 that he had no information on top criminals such as Pichchi Helal. He detained actress Meher Afroz Shaon in February 2025, the same day her ancestral home in Jamalpur District was burned down. He stated the actress was arrested for "anti-state conspiracy". She was released along with fellow actress Sohana Saba. In April 2025, he was removed from the Detective Branch following the controversial arrest of model Meghna Alam.

On 7 May 2025, he was appointed as the chief of Dhaka Range Police. After the Muhammad Yunus-led interim government announced a ban on the Awami League, he warned that activities of the party will be curtailed with a "strong hand".
