= Notun Mukher Shondhane =

- Type: Talent search competition
- Field: Film (Acting and other crew/technical roles)
- Organizer(s): Bangladesh Film Development Corporation; Bangladesh Film Directors Association
- Purpose: To discover and recruit new actors and technical personnel for Dhallywood cinema.
- First Event: 1984
- Notable Discoveries: Manna, Diti, Misha Sawdagor, Amit Hasan, Amin Khan, Sohel Chowdhury.

Notun Mukher Shondhane (Bengali: নতুন মুখের সন্ধানে, lit. 'Search for New Faces') is a talent hunt program or competition organized by the Government of Bangladesh and various film-related organizations, primarily aimed at discovering new actors, actresses, and technical crew for the Bangladeshi film industry, specifically Dhallywood. Its main objective is to alleviate the shortage of artists and technical experts in the industry and integrate new talent into mainstream cinema.

== History ==
'Notun Mukher Shondhane' is regarded as an important initiative in the history of Bangladeshi cinema. This program was launched to provide opportunities to new faces when the film industry faced a shortage of skilled actors and technical personnel. The **Bangladesh Film Development Corporation (BFDC)** was the primary initiator of this competition.

=== Main phases ===
The competition was held in its initial phases, discovering several artists for the film industry. The three main phases are:

- First Phase: 1984
- Second Phase: 1986 or 1988
- Third Phase: 1990

After 1990, the program was discontinued for nearly two decades.

=== Subsequent initiatives ===
Following an intensifying crisis in the film industry regarding artist shortages, efforts were made at various times to restart the program:

- **Notun Mukher Shondhane 2011:** This phase was initiated as a joint venture between the **Bangladesh Film Development Corporation (BFDC)** and **Channel i**.
- **Notun Mukher Shondhane 2019:** The Bangladesh Film Directors Association announced the revival of the competition in 2019 after a long hiatus. This initiative received cooperation from the Ministry of Information and the BFDC.

=== Competition structure ===
The 'Notun Mukher Shondhane' competition generally selects artists across multiple categories. These categories typically include: male lead (hero), female lead (heroine), supporting actor, supporting actress, villain, comedian, and child artist.

Preliminary selection rounds for applicants are usually held in divisional cities across the country, with the final round taking place in Dhaka at the BFDC. The selection process is conducted by a panel of judges composed of respected film directors and veteran actors.

== Notable actors ==
Through the 'Notun Mukher Shondhane' program, Bengali cinema has discovered several popular and successful actors and actresses, including:

- Manna (1984 batch): A highly successful action hero and producer.
- Diti (1984 batch): A popular actress.
- Misha Sawdagor (1990 batch): A long-serving and successful film villain.
- Amit Hasan (1986 batch): A popular actor and later villain.
- Amin Khan (1990 batch): A popular film actor.
- Sohel Chowdhury (1984 batch): Actor.
- Khaleda Akter Kalpana (Actress).

== Criticism ==
Controversies have arisen regarding subsequent initiatives, including their failure to conclude on time, organizational complexities, and the issue of selected artists not receiving consistent work opportunities in the film industry.
