= Gazi Nazrul Islam =

Bangladeshi politician

- গাজী নজরুল ইসলাম
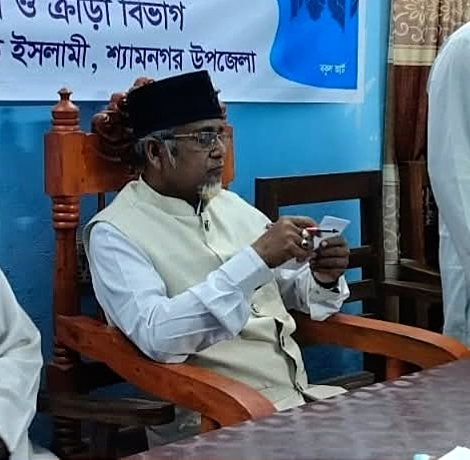
- Nazrul in 2026

Member of Parliament
- Incumbent
- Assumed office 17 February 2026
- Preceded by: SM Ataul Haque
- Constituency: Satkhira-4
- In office 1 October 2001 – 28 October 2006
- Preceded by: AK Fazlul Haque
- Succeeded by: Constituency Abolished
- Constituency: Satkhira-5
- In office 27 February 1991 – 15 February 1996
- Preceded by: Sheikh Abul Hossain
- Succeeded by: GM Abdul Haq
- Constituency: Satkhira-5

Personal details
- Born: 21 May 1951 (age 75)
- Party: Independent
- Other political affiliations: Bangladesh Jamaat-e-Islami (1983–2026)
- Website: gazinazrulislam.com

Military service
- Allegiance: JSD
- Branch/service: Gonobahini
- Years of service: 1972–1975
- Battles/wars: Leftist insurgency

Gazi Nazrul Islam, also known as G. M. Nazrul Islam is an politician and a member of parliament for Satkhira-4. He was part of the Bangladesh Jamaat-e-Islami party before being expelled due to controversy in July 2026.

== Career ==
According to the locals, Gazi Nazrul Islam was involved with Gonobahini, the armed wing of Jatiya Samajtantrik Dal following Bangladesh's independence. He also allegedly involved in operations weapons looting from the Burigoalini Naval Police Outpost in Shyamnagar as well as the killing of a police officer in Harinagar village of Munshiganj Union in 1974. He later joined Bangladesh Jamaat-e-Islami. Islam was elected to parliament from Satkhira-5 as a Bangladesh Jamaat-e-Islami candidate in 1991. and 2001.

== Controversy ==
On 20 July 2026, a CCTV video showing Gazi Nazrul Islam, 75 years old, in an intimate setting with an 18-year-old woman in a room began circulating on social media.

Initially it was claimed that the video was generated or manipulated using artificial intelligence, but fact-checking organizations confirmed the footage was authentic. He later issued a statement on Facebook, the woman as his second wife, Moriam Begum, stating they had married on 17 June 2026 with the consent of his first wife, Maksuda Islam. He further claimed that on 13 July 2026, while visiting his father-in-law's office in Maghbazar, Dhaka, his driver and his second wife's uncle held them hostage, extorted money, and leaked the private footage following a personal dispute. Video statements supporting these claims were subsequently released by his first wife, his second wife, and his second father-in-law.

Despite these statements, media reports highlighted multiple discrepancies surrounding the marriage claims; while Islam claimed the marriage occurred on 17 June 2026, a resume belonging to Moriam Begum was signed and recommended by Islam on 22 June 2026 for a job application, which listed her marital status as "unmarried" and recorded her date of birth as 22 May 2008. On 21 July 2026, Bangladesh Jamaat-e-Islami issued an official statement through Assistant Secretary General Ahsanul Mahboob Zubair, stating that the party was gathering information and evaluating the situation to determine whether organizational action would be required. On 22 July, he was expelled from the party over violating the Article 62 'moral turpitude' of the party's constitution. On 23 July, in another CCTV footage published by several media outlets Gazi Nazrul Islam was seen having intimacy with another women throughout the corridors and lift of a hotel.

On 20 September 2026, police recovered the hanging body of his second wife 19-year-old Mariam Khatun, the second wife from an apartment at NAM Building in Sher-e-Bangla Nagar, Dhaka. Her father subsequently filed a case under Section 306 of the Penal Code accusing Nazrul, his first wife Maksuda Begum, and another associate of abetting suicide. A Dhaka court subsequently granted police a four-day remand for Nazrul and a one-day remand for his first wife to interrogate them about the death.
