= Wazed Ali Biswas =

Bangladeshi politician

Wazed Ali biswas
- ওয়াজেদ আলী বিশ্বাস
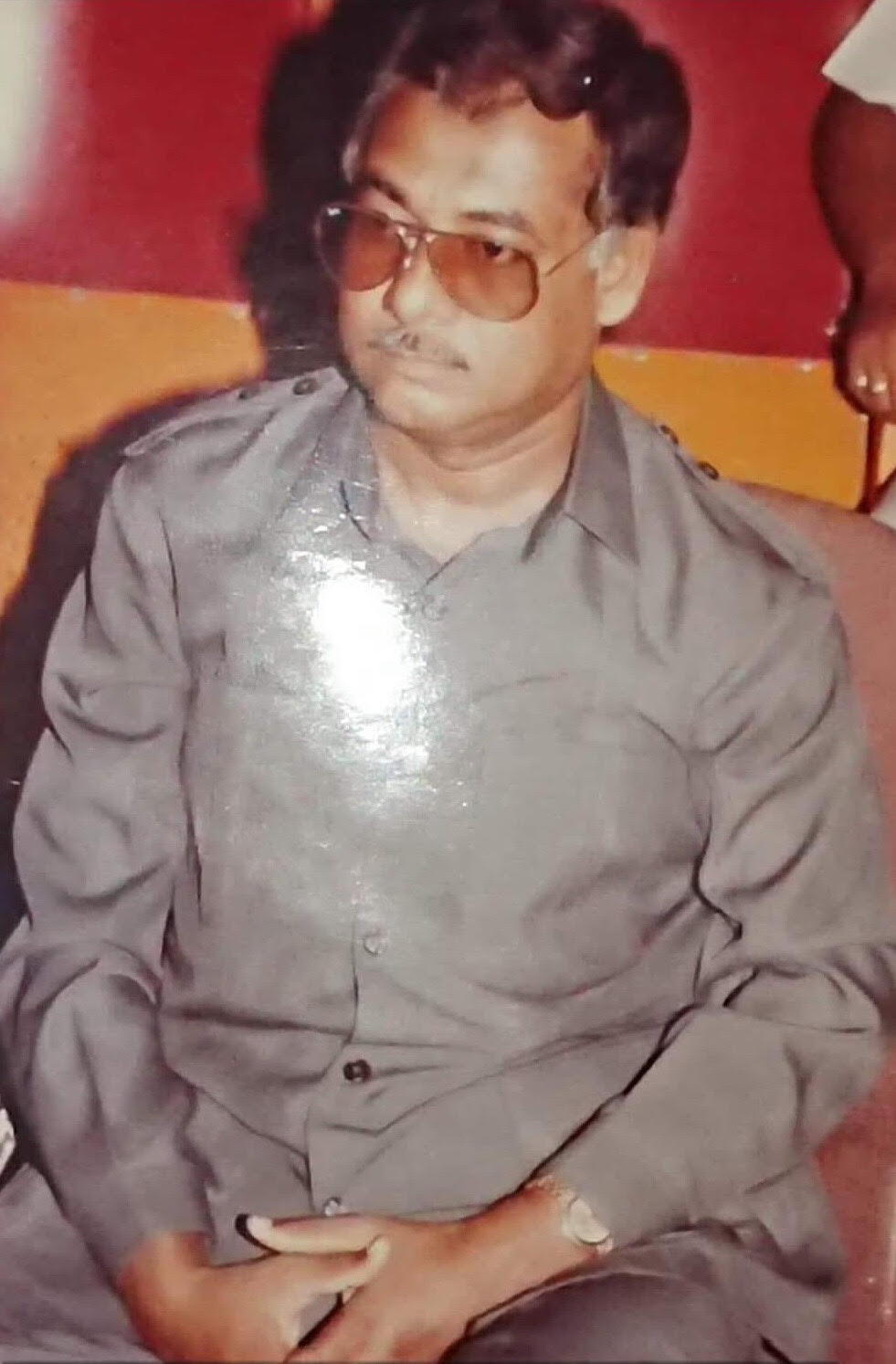

Member of Parliament from Satkhira-4
- In office 15 February 1996 – 12 June 1996
- Preceded by: Mansur Ahmed
- Succeeded by: Shahadat Hossain

Personal details
- Born: 3 March 1947 Satkhira District
- Died: 24 December 2003 (aged 56) Khulna
- Party: Bangladesh Nationalist Party
- Children: 3 sons and 1 daughter

Wazed Ali Biswas (c. 1947-24 December 2003) was a Bangladesh Nationalist Party politician and a businessman from the southern part of Bangladesh. He was elected a member of parliament from Satkhira-4 in February 1996.

== Early life ==
Wazed Ali biswas was born in 1947 in Kaliganz Upazila, Satkhira District. He was the third son of landlord Garibullah Biswas.

== Career ==
Biswas was the owner of Khulna-based daily Janata Khabar and president of the BNP's Kaliganj upazila branch. He was elected to parliament from Satkhira-4 as a Bangladesh Nationalist Party candidate in the 15 February 1996 Bangladeshi general election.

Wazed Ali, a frozen shrimp exporter, was awarded the National Export Trophy (Gold Medal) on 16 December 2003 by the then Prime Minister Khaleda Zia. He also received the President's Medal for his contribution to agriculture, education and social service in Satkhira district.

== Family ==
Wazed Ali Biswas left behind 3 sons and 1 daughter. His eldest son, Saiful Islam Dual took over his business empire after his demise.

Saiful Islam Dual also received the Prime Minister's Award (Gold Medal) for exports twice. He is a shrimp exporter and has been successfully contributing to the shrimp sector of Bangladesh for nearly two decades. At the age of 27, he became a CIP title holder. He is the Managing Director of 4 Star Group Limited.

Wazed Ali's grandson, Sher A Mohammad Tabib is an aspiring Gen Z Politician and entrepreneur.
