= Sanjidul Islam Emon =

Bangladeshi gangster based in Dhaka

Sanjidul Islam Emon, also known as Captain Emon, is a Bangladeshi gangster based in Dhaka. He was involved with a number of murders from the early 1990s including Sayed Hossain Tipu, the brother former chief of the Bangladesh Army General Aziz Ahmed, and film actor Sohel Chowdhury. There are 33 criminal cases against him.

== Biography ==
Emon was arrested in 2007 by a team of the Criminal Investigation Deparment led by police superintendent Abdullah Aref. Aref was sent into forced retirement in July 2026 and the Anti-Corruption Commission opened an investigation against him.

In March 2008, Emon was arrested after being deported from India to Bangladesh alongside another alleged criminal, Ishaq Ali. Information he provided led to the arrest of Dakat Shahid. According to a report by The Daily Star, he admitted during police interrogation to involvement in seven murders committed between 1993 and 2002. Among those named in the report were Bangladesh Chhatra League leader Ashru, Freedom Party leader Mohiuddin, Awlad Hossain, Bangladesh Nationalist Party politician Liakat Hossain, and film actor Sohel Chowdhury in 1998. Emon also reportedly described his association with Monir Hussain, the younger brother of former Bangladesh Nationalist Party member of parliament Nasiruddin Ahmed Pintu, and said that Pintu had introduced him to Dhaka's criminal underworld. Emon killed Sayeed Ahmed Tipu, brother of Tofail Ahmed Joseph, Haris Ahmed, and former chief of Bangladesh Army Aziz Ahmed.

In December 2014, Emon ordered the murder of Afzal Hossain Sattar alias Gal Kata Sattar, Jatiyatabadi Jubo Dal leader, from inside prison.

Emon was incarcerated at Dhaka Central Jail from 8 December 2015. After the fall of the Sheikh Hasina led Awami League government on 5 August 2024, he was released on bail on 15 August 2024. In February 2025, Dhaka Metropolitan Police Detective Branch chief Rezaul Karim Mallik confirmed that police were conducting operations to locate and arrest Emon following his release on bail. Following his release from prison in August 2024, Emon was named in media reports concerning alleged links to several killings in Dhaka. He was also identified as the prime suspect in a case concerning an attack on two businessmen in the Elephant Road area of Dhaka that left them critically injured. The day after his release, another gangster Picchi Helal was also released on bail. According to a Dhaka Tribune report published in August 2026, police sources alleged that Emon had ordered the killing of Mamun, who was shot dead outside the Dhaka National Medical Institute Hospital in Old Dhaka on 10 November 2025.

In November 2026, Emon was named by police as one of 43 individuals allegedly involved in an attack on the Hazaribagh warehouse of AJR Parcel and Courier Services in Dhaka on 20 October 2026. According to a police officer involved in the investigation, 12 of the 43 individuals had been arrested by 15 November. The courier company also alleged that individuals involved in subsequent attacks on its vehicles and facilities had referred to Emon as their superior. The attacks included the vandalism of delivery vehicles and an arson attack on a warehouse in Mohammadpur. According to The Business Standard, company officials alleged that individuals claiming to work for Emon had demanded that the company pay rent to his associates rather than to the landowner, Sikder Group, with which it had a rental agreement.

A report published by Daily Sun Emon had stayed in Thailand, Malaysia and Cambodia, travelling between those countries and Bangladesh after his release. An assistant inspector general of police, speaking anonymously to the newspaper, said that Emon had returned to Dhaka on several occasions and had visited the Dhaka Boat Club. The report also stated that Emon was attempting to obtain a Laotian passport through a criminal network in Malaysia. The same report described Emon and fellow criminal gangster Picchi Helal, as rivals who allegedly maintained links with political figures and activists in several Dhaka neighbourhoods. Emon had alleged ties with a former advisor of the interim government.

== Personal life ==
Emon is married to Shahnaz Parveen Lina, who ran Emon's criminal enterprise while he was in prison. His brother-in-law is gangster Khandaker Naim Ahmed Titon. The Detective branch considered Emon as suspect in his murder on 28 April 2026. Titon reportedly provided information on Emon's whereabouts to National Security Intelligence and Directorate General of Forces Intelligence. His mother is Dr. Sultana Jahan. His another sister married Ashiq Abdullah, son of Abul Hasnat Abdullah.
