= Picchi Hannan =

Bangladeshi gangster

Picchi Hannan, also spelled as Pichchi Hannan, was a Bangladeshi gangster who was killed in a gunfight with Rapid Action Battalion.

== Early life ==
Hannan was born in Faridganj Upazila, Chandpur District. He moved to Dhaka to support his father's business in Karwan Bazar.

== Career ==
Hannan started his criminal career with minor crimes, then moved on to robbery and murder. He recruited Iqbal Hossain Nitel after he graduated from BAF Shaheen College Dhaka and placed him in charge of the narcotics trade in Agargaon.

In 1998, Hannan was detained by the Bangladesh Police with the assistance of Mohammad Abu Hanif, president of the Ward 39 unit of the Bangladesh Jatiya Sramik League, the labour front of the Awami League, and joint general secretary of the Karwan Bazar Baboshaye Kalyan Samity Super Market. Hannan was released after eight months. He announced a bounty of Hanif and in May 2006 Hanif was shot dead.

Hannan was accused in the 2001 Malibagh killings case, where four people were killed during a political clash in Dhaka, along with former Awami League member of parliament HBM Iqbal. He was named in the charge sheet submitted after a reinvestigation initiated by the Bangladesh nationalist Party-led government. While Hannan was on the run, Iqbal was sent to jail.

The Daily Star reported that juvenile delinquents were being tortured in the Juvenile Development Centre at Tongi by followers of Hannan and Kala Jahangir in September 2003. He was accused in the murder case of Shahadat Hossain Sikder, Dhaka Ward commissioner.

In December 2004, one of Hannan's followers was shot dead in Dhaka. In October 2007, Rapid Action Battalion detained an associate of Picchi Hannan, Nazimuddin Babu, who is the president of the Dhanmondi unit of the Bangladesh Chhatra League. In July 2008, Rapid Action Battalion killed an associate of Hannan, Shaheb Ali, in a gunfight.

== Death ==
On 26 June 2004, Rapid Action Battalion and Bangladesh Police launched a raid on a house in Uttara to detain Hannan. He and his men shot through the police blockade. Some of them, including Hannan, were wounded in the encounter. Two law enforcement personnel were also injured. Rapid Action Battalion detained his associates Babul Mian, Motaleb, Mostafizur Rahman, and Rafiqul Islam Tuku from Uttara after the shootout. Police found the body of Iqbal Hossain Nitel, who was injured in the shootout at Tejgaon, wrapped in blue polythene with a saline needle stuck in his arm.

On 27 June 2004, Hannan was detained by Rapid Action Battalion, led by Lieutenant Colonel Chowdhury Fazlul Bari, from Al-Insaf Clinic, a private clinic in Saver, where he was getting treated for his bullet wounds 40 hours after the shootout. A court granted permission for him to be interrogated under a ten-day remand at the Interrogation Cell. After his detention, he told the media that politically connected groups used him. His associate, Debashish Kumar Das, who was detained with him from Savar, was brought injured to Dhaka Medical College and Hospital and died there. On 6 August, he was taken for a search from custody by Rapid Action Battalion and then was killed in an alleged gunfight. His daughter alleged he was killed for refusing to obey a member of parliament of the ruling Bangladesh Nationalist Party. During his autopsy a single bullet was found in his head.

Following the death of the Hannan, gangsters in Dhaka preferred to stay in prison due to the fear of being extrajudicially killed by the Rapid Action Battalion. By November 2004, Rapid Action Battalion had killed more than 49 gangsters. Lutfozzaman Babar, Minister of Home Affairs was accused of using Hannan for criminal activities.

In 2024, a movie about the life of Hannan was being developed in Dhallywood, starring Joy Chowdhury as Hannan.
