= AK Fazlul Haque =

Bangladeshi politician

Satkhira-5 constituency Member of Parliament
- In office 12 June 1996 – 1 October 2001
- Preceded by: GM Abdul Haq
- Succeeded by: Gazi Nazrul Islam

Personal details
- Born: Shyamnagar, Satkhira
- Party: Awami League

AK Fazlul Haque is a politician of Satkhira District and organizer of the Bangladesh Liberation war who was the member of parliament for the Satkhira-5 constituency.

== Early life ==
Fazlul Haque was born in the Satkhira district. His son SM Ataul Haque Dolan is the general secretary of the Shyamnagar Upazila Awami League.

== Career ==
Fazlul Haque was an organizer of the Bangladesh Liberation war and vice president of the Satkhira District unit of Awami League. He was elected a member of the provincial assembly in 1970 and a member of the constituent assembly in 1982 as an Awami League candidate. He was elected as a member of parliament from the then Satkhira-5 constituency as a candidate of the Awami League in the 7th parliamentary election, on 12 June 1996. He has died.
