= Shahadat Hossain (Satkhira politician) =

Bangladeshi politician

- শাহাদত হোসেন

Member of Parliament for Satkhira-4
- In office 14 July 1996 – 13 July 2001
- Preceded by: Wazed Ali Biswas
- Succeeded by: Kazi Alauddin

Personal details
- Party: Jatiya Party (Ershad)

Shahadat Hossain is a Jatiya Party (Ershad) politician in Bangladesh and a former Jatiya Sangsad member representing the Satkhira-4 constituency during 1996–2001.

== Career ==
Hossain was elected to the parliament from Satkhira-4 as a Jatiya Party candidate in 1996. He is a former vice-president of Jatiya Party. He was expelled from the party in 2009.
