= Sheikh Abul Hossain (Satkhira politician) =

Bangladeshi politician

- শেখ আবুল হোসেন

Member of Parliament for Satkhira-5
- In office 1986–1990
- Succeeded by: Gazi Nazrul Islam

Personal details
- Party: Jatiya Party

Sheikh Abul Hossain is a Bangladeshi politician affiliated with the Jatiya Party who served the Satkhira-5 constituency as a member of the Jatiya Sangsad from 1986 to 1991.

== Birth and early life ==
Sheikh Abul Hossain was born in Satkhira District.

== Career ==
Sheikh Abul Hossain was elected as a member of parliament from the then Satkhira-5 constituency as a candidate of Jatiya Party in the 3rd Jatiya Sangsad elections on 7 May 1986 and the 4th Jatiya Sangsad on 3 March 1988.

He was the first chairman of Satkhira Zilla Parishad from 12 October 1988 to 10 December 1990.
