= Khandaker Naim Ahmed Titon =

Bangladeshi gangster based in Dhaka

- Born: Jessore, Bangladesh
- Died: 28 April 2026; New Market, Dhaka, Bangladesh
- Cause of death: Gunshot
- Occupation: Gangster
- Relatives: Sanjidul Islam Emon (brother-in-law)
- Status: Dead
- Criminal charge: Murder
- Penalty: Death

Khandaker Naim Ahmed Titon was a Bangladeshi gangster based in Dhaka, Bangladesh. Originally from Jashore, he began his criminal activities in the early 1990s alongside his brother Tutul, becoming involved in extortion, land grabbing and arms trading. After moving to Dhaka, he became associated with the criminal network of his brother-in-law, Sanjidul Islam Emon, and rose to prominence in the city's underworld.

In 2001, Titon ranked second on a government list of the country's 23 top criminals. He was arrested in 2004 and later sentenced to death for the murder of businessman Babar Elahi. After spending several years in prison, he was released on bail in August 2024 following the fall of the Sheikh Hasina government. On 28 April 2026, Titon was shot dead in Dhaka's New Market area. Police suspected that a dispute over control of the Bosila cattle market and rivalry over local dominance were among the motives for his killing.

== Early life ==
Titon was originally from the Kharki, Jessore. His father, Fakhruddin, worked as a senior official at a jute mill in Khulna. One of 11 siblings, Titon entered criminal activities at a young age alongside his brother Tutul. During the early 1990s, the brothers became prominent in Jessore through extortion, land grabbing and illegal arms trading.

In 1999, Titon and Tutul were accused of killing two Bangladesh Nationalist Party activists, Moslem Uddin Khokon and Tipu, in the Karbala, Jashore. Following public outrage over the killings, the brothers fled to Dhaka. Tutul was killed in an alleged crossfire with police in 2000.

== Career ==
After moving to Dhaka, Titon became associated with the criminal network of his brother-in-law, Sanjidul Islam Emon, and reportedly served as his second-in-command. He later expanded his criminal network and was involved in arms trading.

In 2001, Titon ranked second on a government list of 23 top criminals. He was arrested in the Dhaka Cantonment in 2004 and was later sentenced to death for the murder of businessman Babar Elahi.

Titon reportedly secured bail in his cases in 2023 but remained in prison because he feared being killed if released.

After the fall of the Sheikh Hasina led Awami League, Titon was released on bail on 13 August 2024 after spending several years in prison along with a number of other underworld figures. Following his release, he reportedly sought to establish himself in business and became involved in a dispute over the lease of the Bosila cattle market.

== Personal life ==
Titon's brother-in-law is fellow gangster Sanjidul Islam Emon.

== Death ==
On 28 April 2026, Titon was shot dead in Dhaka's New Market area. Bangladesh Police suspected that rivalry over local dominance and control of the cattle market may have motivated the killing. His family members suspected Picchi Helal, another gangster, involved in a dispute with him over the control of Bosila cattle market. His brother Khondaker Sayeed Akhtar Ripon filed a murder case after the killing. In September 2026, police arrested two suspects, Ripon alias Ripon Master and Badal alias Kailla Badal, at a residential hotel in Sitakunda. His brother-in-law Emon was also suspected of being involved in the killing by the police.
