= Death of Salman Shah =

1996 death of Bangladeshi actor Salman Shah

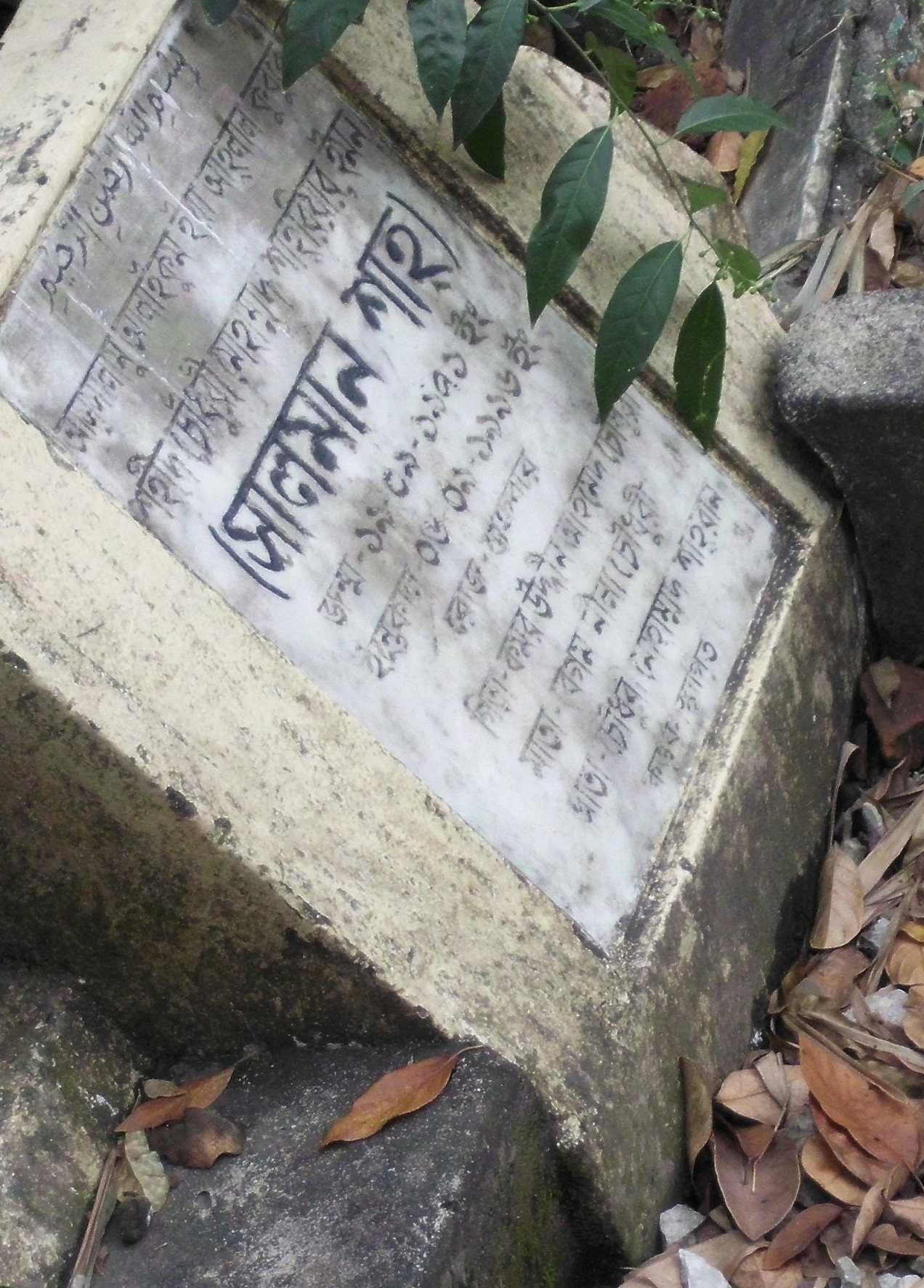
- Epitaph on Shah's gravestone located in the graveyard at Shah Jalal Dargah, Sylhet
- Date: September 6, 1996; 30 years ago
- Location: Dhaka, Bangladesh
- Burial: Shah Jalal Dargah, Sylhet
- Inquiries: Police Bureau of Investigation
- Accused: 11 individuals including Aziz Mohammad Bhai, Samira Haque and Ashraful Haque

On 6 September 1996, Salman Shah was found hanging from the ceiling of his bedroom at Eskaton, Dhaka. Police had filed a case of suicide, but the family objected to it and lodged a murder case. Business tycoon Aziz Mohammad Bhai was alleged to be involved in the murder. Rezvi Ahmed was arrested from the house of Shah's mother, who reportedly named Aziz Mohammad Bhai and Shah's wife Samira Haque for ordering the hit. Rezvi later disavowed his confession. On 24 February 2020, the Police Bureau of Investigation completed its investigation and reported that Salman Shah had killed himself due to a family dispute over his affair with one of the most popular silver screen actresses at the time, actress Shabnur. However, On 20 October 2025, a Dhaka court ordered a murder case over actor Salman Shah’s death after 29 years. Kanak Chapa has said on a YouTube video that Salman Shah appeared to be mentally disturbed before he passed away.

A Dhaka court ordered the case to be registered and investigated as murder, nullifying the 2021 final report from the Police Bureau of Investigation (PBI) which had concluded the death was a suicide.

The 6th Additional Metropolitan Sessions Judge, Md. Jannatul Ferdous Ibn Haque, passed the order after accepting a revision petition filed by Salman Shah's mother, Neela Chowdhury. The court directed the officer-in-charge (OC) of Ramna Model Police Station to treat the original complaint as a murder case.

Following the court's directive, Salman Shah's maternal uncle, Mohammad Alamgir Kumkum, filed a formal murder case at Ramna police station late on October 20. The new case names 11 individuals as accused, including Salman Shah's wife Samira Haque, businessman Aziz Mohammad Bhai, and actor Ashraful Haque (Don). The case has now been assigned to Ramna Model Police Station for investigation.

Shah is buried in Shah Jalal Dargah Cemetery in Sylhet.

== Background ==
Shah entered the Bangladeshi entertainment industry through television dramas and modelling before achieving film stardom.

He made his silver-screen debut in 1993 with the film Keyamot Theke Keyamot, directed by Sohanur Rahman Sohan, which was a box-office hit and catapulted him to popularity.

Between 1993 and his death in 1996, Shah starred in approximately 27 films, all of them were commercially successful.

His popularity arose from a combination of youthful charm, modern fashion sense, and a new style of romantic-hero portrayal which marked a departure from the prevailing hero archetype in Dhallywood.

His on-screen pairings—especially with actresses like Shabnur—became very popular with audiences, and his off-screen persona (personal life, marriage to Samira Haque in August 1992) further heightened his public profile.

Despite his commercial success, Salman Shah’s career was brief (about three years) and his personal circumstances (marital matters, public scrutiny, absence of children) would later take on relevance in investigations after his death.

== Death ==
On the morning of 6 September 1996, Shah was found dead in his flat at New Eskaton Garden (Dhaka). His body was discovered hanging from a ceiling fan, with rope marks around his neck and signs of asphyxiation.

His parents first took him to Holy Family Hospital, where further signs of distress were observed, before moving him to Dhaka Medical College Hospital, where doctors declared him dead on arrival.

Initially registered as an "unnatural death" by his father, Kamar Uddin Chowdhury (died 2002), the case was later pressed by the family to be investigated as a possible murder.

His death shocked the nation and the Bangladeshi film industry, triggering widespread media attention and multiple investigations into the circumstances of his passing.

== Forensic findings at the death scene ==
Investigators examining the apartment of Salman Shah at New Eskaton Garden, Dhaka found that his body was hanging from a ceiling fan with visible rope marks around the neck and signs consistent with asphyxiation. The actor's parents observed his face and legs had turned blue, and rope marks were clearly visible when he was taken to Holy Family Hospital, Dhaka before being moved to Dhaka Medical College Hospital where he was declared dead on arrival.

A suicide note was reportedly recovered from the room and later examined by handwriting experts who concluded the writing was that of Shah, though his family disputes the authenticity of the note. Also found at the scene was a small bottle of sedative (JASOCANE‑A 20 mg) and some wet clothes inside a luggage, leading to questions about the sequence of events and whether the scene was altered.

Investigators also noted that no major furniture displacement or visible signs of a struggle were recorded around the hanging location, yet the timing of the body being taken down and the delay in hospital transfer remained unexplained. Furthermore, witness testimony included claims that two women were rubbing oil on his hands and feet when his parents arrived, and that one relative told his mother to “get out of my house”, raising further suspicion about what took place at the scene.

These findings — hanging from fan, rope‑marks, sedative bottle, wet luggage clothes, disputed note and lack of disturbance — have been cited by both sides of the case: those favouring the suicide conclusion point to absence of clear external injury or forced entry, while those advocating the homicide theory emphasise the anomalies, scene‑irregularities and disputed circumstances.

== Timeline of investigations ==
Date	Agency / Action	Outcome
6 Sep 1996	Initial police report	Registered as “unnatural death”
Jul 1997	Father filed petition to treat as murder	Review order granted
24 Jul 1997	Confession by Rizvi Ahmed (alias Farhad) under Section 164	Alleged planned murder; later retracted
3 Nov 1997	CID investigation final report	Concluded suicide
3 Aug 2014	Judicial probe report	Found no sufficient evidence of homicide
25 Feb 2020	PBI final report (600-page)	Concluded suicide citing relationship & personal issues
31 Oct 2021	Dhaka court	Accepted PBI report
20 Oct 2025	Dhaka court order	Directed filing of murder case and fresh investigation

== Rizvi Ahmed confession ==
In July 1997, Rizvi Ahmed (a.k.a. Farhad) provided a confessional statement under Section 164 alleging that Shah was murdered as part of a contract worth ৳12 lakh. According to his statement, ৳6 lakh was paid in advance and the remaining ৳6 lakh after the killing, reportedly arranged by Shah's mother-in-law, Latifa Haque Lucy.

Rizvi named multiple individuals claimed were involved, including Don and David, and alleged a staged murder scene: incapacitation via chloroform, dragging the actor into a dressing room, tying his legs, hanging the body from a ceiling fan, and applying oils and wet clothes to suggest suicide.

He further claimed that the gatekeeper allowed entry to the conspirators and that pressure was applied on the actor’s family to keep the matter quiet.

Rizvi later retracted his confession, and subsequent investigations by the Criminal Investigation Department and Police Bureau of Investigation did not find sufficient evidence of homicide.

Despite the retraction, Rizvi Ahmed's confession remains a significant element in the ongoing debate about the circumstances of Shah's death and is frequently cited by the actor’s family and in media reports alleging murder.

== Family claims and allegations ==
Shah's mother, Neela Chowdhury, has consistently asserted that her son was murdered and did not commit suicide. She and family members have repeatedly named several persons—including the actor’s ex-wife Samira Haque—in allegations of conspiracy.

== Forensic and investigative findings ==
The Police Bureau of Investigation report submitted in February 2020 concluded that Shah committed suicide, citing multiple contributing factors including a romantic relationship with Shabnur, marital distress, prior suicide attempts, and family conflict.

The PBI stated that a suicide note was recovered and verified through handwriting experts.

Earlier investigations by the Criminal Investigation Department and judicial probes found no compelling evidence of homicide.

== Media coverage and public reaction ==
The death of Shah sent shockwaves across Bangladesh and triggered an unprecedented response from fans, the media, and the entertainment industry. Thousands of fans gathered at his funeral and memorial sites, expressing grief and demanding justice.

Media coverage of the case was extensive and often sensationalized, with debates centering on whether his death was a suicide or a murder. Newspapers and television channels ran investigative stories, interviews with family members, and discussions with legal and forensic experts.

Several individuals from the film industry publicly commented on his death:

- Actress Bobita recalled: “I still carry Salman’s memories with me … He was a much better actor … The untimely demise of an actor like him is really very painful for us.”
- Actor Shakib Khan posted on social media: “Wherever you are, I wish peace for your soul.”
- Director Sohanur Rahman Sohan described him as "a revolutionary talent who transformed romantic hero portrayal in Bangladeshi cinema".
- Actress Shabnur stated: "He was a sensitive and talented actor whose loss left a void in Dhallywood".
- Actor Riaz mentioned: "I could not believe that someone so young and full of life could be gone so suddenly, and the industry still mourns him".

Social and cultural commentary around his death also reflected broader issues, such as mental health, the pressures of stardom, and the need for protective measures for actors facing intense public scrutiny.

Over the years, anniversaries of his death have consistently been marked by fans paying tribute, media retrospectives, and renewed discussions on the unresolved aspects of his case.

== Current status ==
As of late 2025, a murder case has been filed at Ramna Police Station naming 11 accused persons following a court order that directed the case be treated as murder.

Travel bans have been imposed on suspects including Samira Haque and actor Don to prevent them from leaving Bangladesh.

Immigration authorities have been alerted, and police investigations are ongoing.

== See also ==
- List of unsolved deaths
