= Swami Stree =

Bangladeshi film

- Poster
- Directed by: Subhash Dutta
- Produced by: Shabana
- Starring: Razzak; Shabana; Alamgir; Diti
- Music by: Alauddin Ali
- Release date: 31 July 1987 (Bangladesh)
- Running time: 148 minutes
- Country: Bangladesh
- Language: Bengali

Swami Stree (English: Husband and Wife) (Bengali: স্বামী স্ত্রী) is a 1987 Bangladeshi film starring Razzak, Shabana, Alamgir and Parvin Sultana Diti in lead roles. The latter earned Bangladesh National Film Award for Best Supporting Actress that year. Subhash Dutta directed the film.

== Songs ==
1. "Jedike Tumi Dekhbe Chokhe" - Sabina Yasmin and Syed Abdul Hadi
2. "Je Sukher Nei Kono Simana" - Sabina Yasmin

== Awards ==
Bangladesh National Film Awards

- Best Supporting Actress - Parvin Sultana Diti
