= Satkhira-4 =

Constituency of Bangladesh's Jatiya Sangsad

Coordinates: 22.34°N 89.10°E

- Constituency for the Jatiya Sangsad
- District: Satkhira District
- Division: Khulna Division
- Electorate: 393,767 (2018)

Current constituency
- Created: 1984
- Party: Bangladesh Jamaat-e-Islami
- Member of Parliament: Gazi Nazrul Islam
- ← 107 Satkhira-3 109 Barguna-1 →

Satkhira-4 is a constituency represented in the Jatiya Sangsad (National Parliament) of Bangladesh.

== Boundaries ==
The constituency encompasses Shyamnagar Upazila.

== History ==
The constituency was created in 1984 from a Khulna constituency when the former Khulna District was split into three districts: Bagerhat, Khulna, and Satkhira.

Ahead of the 2026 general election, the Election Commission reduced the boundaries of the constituency by removing union parishads of Kaliganj Upazila.

== Members of Parliament ==
Election	Member	Party
1986	Mansur Ahmed Gazi	Awami League
1988	M. Mansur Ali	Jatiya Party
1991	Mansur Ahmed Gazi	Awami League
Feb 1996	Wazed Ali biswas	BNP
Jun 1996	Shahadat Hossain	Jatiya Party
2001	Kazi Alauddin	Bangladesh Jatiya Party
2008	HM Golam Reza	Jatiya Party
2014	SM Jaglul Hayder	Awami League
2024	SM Ataul Haque	Awami League
2026	Gazi Nazrul Islam	Bangladesh Jamaat-e-Islami

== Elections ==
=== Elections in the 2010s ===
SM Jaglul Hayder was elected unopposed in the 2014 general election after opposition parties withdrew their candidacies in a boycott of the election.

=== Elections in the 2000s ===
General Election 2008: Satkhira-4
Party	Candidate	Votes	%	±%
JP(E)	HM Golam Reza	151,147	56.0	N/A
Jamaat	G. M. Nazrul Islam	117,675	43.6	N/A
BSD	Khogandronath Ghosh	506	0.2	N/A
BDB	Tarun Kumar Karmakar	401	0.1	N/A
Zaker Party	Sheikh Hasan Ali	311	1.0	N/A
NAP	Abdul Hai	105	0.0	N/A
Majority		33,472	12.4	−9.1
Turnout		270,145	88.9	−0.4
JP(E) gain from BJP				

General Election 2001: Satkhira-4
Party	Candidate	Votes	%	±%
BJP	Kazi Alauddin	108,172	56.0	+34.9
AL	AFM Ruhal Haque	66,561	34.5	+5.9
Independent	Shahadat Hossain	12,310	6.4	N/A
IJOF	Md. Mahbubur Rahman	5,978	3.1	N/A
Bangladesh Samajtantrik Dal (Basad-Khalekuzzaman)	Shashanka Shekhar Sarder	167	0.1	N/A
Majority		41,611	21.5	−19.9
Turnout		193,188	89.3	+3.0
BJP gain from JP(E)				

=== Elections in the 1990s ===
General Election June 1996: Satkhira-4
Party	Candidate	Votes	%	±%
JP(E)	Shahadat Hossain	46,730	30.2	+16.9
AL	Mansur Ahmed	44,272	28.6	−5.4
BNP	Md. Wazed Ali Biswash	32,635	21.1	+0.5
Jamaat	G. M. Abdul Gaffar	30,151	19.5	−12.4
IOJ	Mohiuddin Ahmed	524	0.3	N/A
Jatiya Samajtantrik Dal-JSD	Kazi Sufiullah Faruqi	148	0.1	0.0
Bangladesh Samajtantrik Dal (Khalekuzzaman)	Shashanka Shekhar Sardar	145	0.1	N/A
Zaker Party	Sheikh Abdur Rauf	127	0.1	N/A
Majority		2,458	1.6	−0.5
Turnout		154,732	86.3	+11.1
JP(E) gain from AL				

General Election 1991: Satkhira-4
Party	Candidate	Votes	%	±%
AL	Mansur Ahmed	44,225	34.0	
Jamaat	G. M. Abdul Gaffar	41,552	31.9	
BNP	Md. Shahadat Hossain Mondol	26,760	20.6	
JP(E)	M. Mansur Ali	17,332	13.3	
Bangladesh Muslim League (Kader)	Mohiuddin Ahmad	199	0.2	
Jatiya Samajtantrik Dal-JSD	Swapan Kumar Nandi	105	0.1	
Majority		2,673	2.1	
Turnout		130,173	75.2	
AL gain from JP(E)				
