= Dakat Shahid =

Bangladeshi criminal

Shahidul Bhuiyan
- Born: Shahidul Bhuiyan; Srinagar, Munshiganj District, Bangladesh
- Died: 4 July 2012; Dhaka, Bangladesh
- Other names: Dakat Shahid, Arman
- Occupation: Gangster
- Years active: 1980s–2012
- Known for: Armed robbery, extortion, tender manipulation
- Status: Deceased
- Penalty: Life imprisonment (murder), 17 years (arms case)
- Accomplices: Abul group, Liakat, Kalam alias Kalu

Shahidul Bhuiyan, widely known as Dakat Shahid, was a Bangladeshi gangster who rose to prominence in Old Dhaka’s underworld during the late 1980s and 1990s. Shahidul was killed in a shootout with the Rapid Action Battalion in Dhaka.

== Early life ==
Shahidul was born into a farmer’s family in Sreenagar Upazila, Munshiganj District, to Shamsul Haque Bhuiyan. He began engaging in criminal activity as a teenager, reportedly starting around the age of 14 or 15.

== Career ==
By the late 1980s, Shahidul had gained notoriety as a launch and bus robber in and around Dhaka, which earned him the nickname "Dakat Shahid" as dakat means robber in Bengali. His criminal career escalated when he was elected joint secretary of the Dhaka Bikrampur Bus Sramik Committee in 1990, a position that expanded his influence and connections in extortion and arms trafficking. His associate, Sanjidul Islam Emon, killed Sayed Hossain Tipu, brother of Tofail Ahmed Joseph, Haris Ahmed, and Aziz Ahmed.

That same year, a robbery case was filed against Shahidul, leading to a three-month jail term. After his release, he travelled to Kuwait in 1991 but returned to Dhaka three years later, settling in Jurain. According to locals, Shahidul had recruited poor youths into his gang and maintained an extensive cadre network in Old Dhaka. Some family members of his associates publicly blamed him for coercing their children into crime. He was accused in the 2000 murder of Bangladesh Nationalist Party leader Advocate Habib Mandol.

With backing from the Abul group, Shahidul became involved in tender manipulation and later aligned with Liakat to expand operations in Wari. Around 1998–1999, Shahid reportedly purchased 66 weapons and was implicated in the killings of Sultan and Kalu, members of the Sanaullah group, a rival gang.

In the early 2000s, Shahid consolidated control over bus and truck stands in Dhaka through extortion and influence on tenders. His activities led to multiple arrests, including a 2004 detention with five firearms by Detective Branch assistant commissioner Akram Hussain, for which he served one year in Old Dhaka Central Jail. He was accused in the case filed over the 2002 murder of the Bangladesh Nationalist Party-backed Ward Commissioner of Dhaka City Corporation, Binoy Krishna Sarkar. He had also ordered the killing of Sagir Ahmed, a leader of the Bangladesh Jatiotabadi Jubodal. He was an accused in the ward commissioner Shahadat Hossain Sikder murder case.

Following the creation of the Rapid Action Battalion in 2004, Shahidul relocated to Jessore under the alias "Arman". In 2005, he crossed into India, where he resided in Nadia, Kolkata, and Odisha. Intelligence reports suggest that he continued to coordinate with Bangladeshi criminals and received monthly funds via Hundi transfers. He was reportedly detained in India along with Haris Ahmed and Tanvir Islam Joy around 2007. He later moved to Nepal in 2010. In June 2011, the Bangladesh Police detained two of his associates. His second in command, Ruhul Amin, was killed in a gunfight with the Detective Branch.

Shahidul ordered the murder of Dhaka City Corporation ward councillor Ahmed Hossain after receiving a contract from a political rival of Hossain. The rival wanted to sell an LPG factory, co-owned by Hossain, to Ahmed Akbar Sobhan, the chairperson of the Bashundhara Group, who was also questioned by the police during their investigation. Justice AHM Shamsuddin Chowdhury and Justice Md. Delwar Hossain refused a petition by Sobhan to halt the police order summoning him for questioning. He also ordered the killing of Prem Krishno Roy, a goldsmith, for refusing to pay extortion money. His gang killed on duty personnel of the Bangladesh Ansar while attacking a gas station in Jatrabari in June 2011.

== Personal life ==
Shahidul was married to Saleha Begum, with whom he had two daughters. His wife and children resided in Kolkata at the time of his death. His elder brother, Nurul Islam, stated that the family did not wish to claim Shahidul's body due to fear of reprisals.

== Death ==
By 2012, Shahidul had returned to Dhaka and resumed operations. Associates, including Kalu, Mihir, and Mamun, carried out extortion under his name. Shahidul was killed in a shootout with the Rapid Action Battalion in Dhaka on 4 July 2012, along with associate Kalam alias Kalu. Shahidul's death drew public attention, with hundreds visiting the morgue to view his body. He was buried at Azimpur graveyard. Three of his associates, including his second in command Tablet Babu, were detained in August 2012 by the Detective Branch. In October, police detained the youngest member of his gang, 14-year-old boy. His followers took over various parts of his territory.
