= HM Golam Reza =

Bangladeshi politician

Member of Bangladesh Parliament
- In office 2008–2014
- Preceded by: Kazi Alauddin
- Succeeded by: SM Jaglul Hayder

Personal details
- Party: Trinomool BNP
- Other political affiliations: Jatiya Party (Ershad)

HM Golam Reza is a Bangladeshi politician and a former member of parliament for Satkhira-4.

== Career ==
Reza was elected to parliament from Satkhira-4 as a Jatiya Party (Ershad) candidate in 2008. He was expelled from the Jatiya Party following a dispute with party president, Hussain Muhammad Ershad.

He contested the 2024 Bangladeshi general election as a candidate of the Trinomool BNP.
