= Parveen Sultana Diti =

Bangladeshi actress

Diti
- দিতি
- Born: Parveen Sultana; 31 March 1965; Sonargaon, Narayanganj District, East Pakistan
- Died: 20 March 2016 (aged 50); Dhaka, Bangladesh
- Resting place: Sonargaon, Narayanganj, Bangladesh
- Occupation: Actress
- Spouse(s): Sohel Chowdhury (m. 1986 - div. 1995); Ilias Kanchan (divorced)
- Children: 2
- Awards: Bangladesh National Film Awards

Parveen Sultana (Bengali: পারভীন সুলতানা দিতি known by her stage name Diti; 31 March 1965 – 20 March 2016) was a Bangladeshi film and television actress. She won the Bangladesh National Film Award for Best Supporting Actress in 1987 for her performance in Swami Stree. She acted in more than 200 films in her career.

Starting her career with the film Daak Diye Jai, Diti quickly established herself as one of top actresses from mid 1980's to mid 1990's with movies such as Shami Stri, Benam Badshah, Strir Paona, Soshur Bari, Shesh Upohar, Mohan Bondhu, Mastan Raja, Bishash Obishash, Chakor, Doshi, Bishash Obishash, Chakor, Dui Jibon, Apon Ghor, Bheja Chokh, Lokkhir Songshar, Okritogo, Shomor, and Hingshar Agun.

Starting from the 1990's, she moved onto playing agrresive women centric action characters moving away from her original soft characters with movies such as Ajker Hungama, Khuner Bodla, Papi Shotru, Lady Inspector, Hotta, Bhai Keno Asami, Ojana Shotru, Shartophor, Bishash Obishash, Bhai Keno Asami, Hingshar Agun, Bachar Lorai, Khuner Bodla, Mukti Chai, Hotta, Polatok Ashami, Haramkhor, Beimani, Attoprokash. Her other notable movies during 1990's include Sukher Ghore Dukher Agun, Atto Bishash, Priyo Shotru, Manush, Sesh Protikkha, Luttoraj, Otikrom, Chakranter Shikar, Ashami Greftar, Amar Desh Amar Prem, Durjoy, Amma, Ami Ek Omanush, Chorom Aghat, Ochol Poysa, Raja Gunda, Kaliya, Bodla Nebo, and Shoth Manush.

== Early life and education ==
Diti was born in Sonargaon, Narayanganj district to her parents Abul Hossain and Nurjahan Begum. She completed higher secondary examination from Eden Mohila College and bachelor's from Lalmatia Women College.

== Career ==
As a singer, Diti got an award at a national competition by the Bangladesh Shishu Academy. While she was singing for Bangladesh Television, she was noticed by actor Al Mansur. He cast her in the television drama "Laili Majnu" opposite of actor Manas Bandopadhyay. Diti came to the film industry through the talent hunt competition "Notun Mukher Sondhane" in 1984.

Diti debuted her acting career in the film Daak Diye Jai, directed by Udayon Chowdhury. The film was never released. Her first released film was Ami-i Ostad. She acted in television dramas. She also hosted a television show on cooking lessons.

== Personal life ==
Diti married actor Sohel Chowdhury in 1986. Chowdhury was also a winner of the competition "Notun Mukher Sondhane" in the same year as Diti was. Chowdhury died from gun shots in 1998 at Trumps Club in Banani. The couple were divorced before this incident. Together they had a daughter, Lamia Chowdhury (b.1987), and a son, Shafayet Chowdhury Dipto (b. 1989). Later Diti married actor Ilias Kanchan which ended up in divorce as well.

== Cancer and death ==
Diti was diagnosed with brain cancer on 25 July 2015. She was treated in Madras Institute of Orthopaedics and Traumatology in Chennai, India, and died on 20 March 2016 in the United Hospital in Dhaka.

== Selected filmography ==
- Amie Ustad (1984)
- Parbat
- Swami Stree (1987)
- Dui Jibon
- Hiramoti
- Bhai Bondhu
- Kathin Protishodh
- Sneher Pratidan
- Usila
- Hangama
- Lady Inspector
- Khuner Badla
- Ajker Hungama
- Shesh Upohar
- Chorom Aghat
- Chirodiner Sathi
- Aporadhi
- Premer Protidan
- Beporoa
- Garial Bhai
- Kaliya
- Mukti
- Char Satiner Ghar
- Priyo Satru
- Kaal Sokale
- Noy Number Bipod Sanket (2007)
- Megher Koley Rod (2008)
- Akash Chhoa Bhalobasa (2008)
- Mayamoy
- Matir Thikana (2011)
- Purno Doirgho Prem Kahini (2013)
- Jonakir Alo (2014)
- Dui Prithibi (2015)
- Sweetheart (2016)
- Ei Golpe Bhalobasha Nei (2017)

== Awards ==
Year	Award	Category	Film	Results
1987	National Film Awards	Best Actress in a Supporting Role	Swami Stree	Won
