= Killer Abbas =

Bangladeshi gangster

Killer Abbas, born Abbas Ali, is a Bangladeshi gangster described by The Daily Star as the "top terror of Dhaka's underworld". He was one of many gangsters released after the fall of the Sheikh Hasina led Awami League government. He revived his gang and returned to crime following his release.

== Career ==
Abbas began his criminal career at the age of 16.

Bangladesh Police labelled him "top terror" along with 23 other major gangsters of Dhaka in 2001. The government announced a 50 thousand Bangladeshi Taka reward for information on his whereabouts. In May 2002, Saidur Rahman Newton, Dhaka City Corporation ward commissioner and Bangladesh Nationalist Party politician, was shot dead in Dhanmondi near Rapa Plaza. Abbas was sentenced to death in the murder case in 2006 along with Kala Jahangir. He was acquitted by the High Court Division in 2011.

Abbas was detained on 14 February 2003 from Helvetia fast food in Gulshan after he shot two businessmen at the Dhaka District and Sessions Judge's Court. He was an accused in two murder cases. In September, he was sentenced to life imprisonment for the possession of illegal firearms. He was kept in Narayanganj Jail.

Metropolitan Magistrate Jagannath Das Khokan acquitted Abbas in an attempted murder case from 1998 after the government failed to present persecution witnesses in 2006. There are five other cases against him.

In 2010, Sahara Khatun, Minister of Home Affairs, released a list of top criminals in Bangladesh which included Abbas. He attended a secret meeting of Dhaka gangsters imprisoned in Kashimpur Central Jail, where Bikash Kumar Biswas was elected leader of the various gangs in Dhaka. Threats were sent to the inspector general of prisons, Brigadier General Syed Iftekhar Uddin, after he transferred Abbas to Jessore Jail.

Following the fall of the Sheikh Hasina led Awami League government, Abbas was released on bail from Kashimpur Central Jail in August 2024 along with other top gangsters. After being released, he revived his gang in Mirpur Model Thana, Kafrul Thana, and Bhashantek Thana to engage in extortion. His gang stopped the demolition work of a government school by a contractor as they failed to pay the extortion money demanded. Dhaka Metropolitan Police announced plans to file an appeal against his bail.
