= Md Shah Kamal =

Md Shah Kamal is a retired senior secretary of the Ministry of Disaster Management and Relief and the chief national commissioner of Bangladesh Scouts.

== Career ==
Kamal first joined Bangladesh Scouts (then Pakistan Scouts) in 1968.

Kamal has received Silver Elisha and Silver Tiger, the top two awards of Bangladesh Scouts.

From March 2015 to 2019, Kamal was the secretary of the Ministry of Disaster Management and Relief. In August 2017, Md Abdul Haque, general secretary of Sunamganj Bar Association, sued Kamal and 139 others over comments critical of residents of Sunamganj District affected by flood for saying they do not understand disaster zone based on their demands to declare the flood zones disaster areas and for poor construction of wetland dams leading to flooding.

Kamal allowed an inspection team of the United Nations to visit Bhasan Char, where the government planned to house 100 thousand Rohingya refugees, in November 2019. He was responsible for allocation aid and money to deputy commissioners during the COVID-19 pandemic in Bangladesh. He was promoted to Senior Secretary in 2019 and served till June 2020 when he retired from government service on 29 June 2020. He sought nomination from Awami League for Chandpur-5 ahead of the 2024 general election.

In July 2024, Kamal was elected chief national commissioner of Bangladesh Scouts winning against another retired government secretary, Kabir Bin Anwar. He replaced Md Mozammel Haque Khan. On 16 August 2024, Dhaka Metropolitan Police raided his residence and recovered 31.1 million BDT. He was arrested on 18 August. Also seized from his house was US$3000 and nearly $2000 AUD. The police also detained his business partner, Nusrat Hossain. He was charged under The Foreign Exchange Regulation Act, 1947.

After the fall of the Sheikh Hasina led Awami League government, a murder case was filed against Kamal by Bangladesh Nationalist Party politician Mohammad Zaman Hossain Khan over the death of a protestor in July 2024.
