= Satkhira-5 =

Constituency of Bangladesh's Jatiya Sangsad

- Former constituency for the Jatiya Sangsad
- District: Satkhira District
- Division: Khulna Division

Former constituency
- Created: 1984
- Abolished: 2006

Satkhira-5 is a defunct constituency represented in the Jatiya Sangsad (National Parliament) of Bangladesh abolished in 2006.

== Members of Parliament ==
Election	Member	Party
1986	Sheikh Abul Hossain	Jatiya Party
1991	Gazi Nazrul Islam	Jamaat-e-Islami Bangladesh
February 1996	GM Abdul Haq	BNP
June 1996	AK Fazlul Haque	Awami League
2001	Gazi Nazrul Islam	Jamaat-e-Islami Bangladesh
Abolished constituency
