= Aziz Mohammad Bhai =

Bangladeshi industrialist (born 1968)

- আজিজ মোহাম্মদ ভাই
- Born: April 17, 1948 (age 78); Armanitola, Dhaka, East Pakistan
- Citizenship: Bangladeshi
- Education: University of Dhaka
- Occupations: Businessman; Film producer
- Known for: Murder of Salman Shah; Murder of Sohel Chowdhury
- Criminal charges: Murder
- Criminal penalty: Life imprisonment
- Criminal status: Absconding
- Spouses: Naureen Aziz M. Bhai
- Children: 5
- Parents: Mohammad Bhai (father); Khatija Mohammad Bhai (mother)

Aziz Mohammad Bhai (b. 1948) is a Bangladeshi industrialist and murder convict. He is the chairman of Olympic Industries PLC, the largest biscuit manufacturer of Bangladesh.

Aziz has been accused of being the mastermind in the murders of two of Bangladesh's most popular actors, Salman Shah and Sohel Chowdhury. In May 2024, Bhai was sentenced to life imprisonment for the 1998 murder of Sohel Chowdhury. He is currently absconding and lives in Bangkok.

== Early life ==
Aziz Mohammad Bhai was born in Armanitola, Dhaka, in 1948 to Mohammad Bhai (d. 2018) and Khatija Mohammad Bhai. The family belong to the Nizari Ismaili community. They migrated from Kanpur to East Pakistan during the partition of India in 1947. Mohammad Bhai was an industrialist and philanthropist. He served as president of the United Chamber of Commerce and as president of the Aga Khan Supreme Council for Bangladesh for over 20 years. Aziz had a younger brother, Raja Mohammad Bhai (d. 2010), and has 2 sisters, Nurjehan Hudda (b. 1945) and Sakina Miraly (b. 1950). Aziz graduated from the University of Dhaka.

== Business ==
The Bhai family have founded some of Bangladesh's leading industries. In 1988, the Bhai family was ranked the 6th largest business family in Bangladesh with a turnover of around BDT 400 crore (~BDT 5,000 crore in 2026). Aziz is a life member of the SAARC Chamber of Commerce and Industry and the serving chairman of his family's flagship company, Olympic Industries PLC. Along with his businesses in Bangladesh, Aziz also has numerous hotel and resort businesses spread throughout Thailand, Malaysia, Hong Kong, Singapore, and Pakistan.

Companies founded by the Bhai family include:

- Olympic Industries PLC
- Ambee Pharmaceuticals PLC (a pharma joint-venture with Medimpex of Hungary)
- Ambee Films Ltd.
- Ambee Ltd. (Aziz’s personal holding company, owner of 3.29% of Olympic)
- Bengal Steel Works Ltd. (a steel mill founded by Mohammad Bhai in the 1950s)
- ATV (a defunct television channel shut down after allegations of espionage)
- Leather Industries of Bangladesh Ltd.
- Jessore Jute Industries Ltd.
- Platinum Finance Corporation
- Industrial Promotion Services (Bangladesh branch of the AKFED subsidiary)
- Tripti Industries Ltd. (vegetable oil company merged with Olympic in 2008)
- RMB Fisheries Ltd. (founded by Aziz's brother Raja M. Bhai)
- Quantum Electronics (dealer for Panasonic products)
- Manticore Technology Ltd.
- Manticore Engineering Ltd.
- MCO Holding Ltd.
- Bengal Petroleum and Oxus Enterprises Ltd.
- Bongo BD (co-founded by Ahad M. Bhai)

=== Olympic Industries PLC ===
Olympic Industries PLC is the largest biscuit manufacturer of Bangladesh. It is listed with both the Dhaka and Chittagong Stock Exchange with a market capitalisation of over BDT 30 billion. Olympic holds 22% of Bangladesh's snack market and 30% of its biscuit market. The company was founded as Bengal Carbide Ltd. in 1979 as a battery manufacturer by Mohammad Bhai and his brother, Mubarak Ali (d. 2023). The company changed its name to its current form in 1996 when they entered the food processing industry. The Bhai family owns over 40% of Olympic. Aziz became the chairman of Olympic in 2023, succeeding his father and uncle as head of the company.

In 2021, the Bonik Barta reported that the Bhai family wanted to wind up their businesses in Bangladesh and permanently move to abroad. This was due to the numerous controversies surrounding the family including charges of murder, espionage, financial scams, and drug trafficking, which hampered their ability to properly manage the company. By 2021, Mohammad Bhai and Raja M. Bhai were dead, Mubarak Ali (the erstwhile managing director of the company) was facing old-age complications, and Aziz was absconding in Thailand. This left Olympic without a proper corporate head. Thus, the family took a joint decision to sell the company off and move to Thailand. Numerous asset management companies, merchant banks, and stock brokerages were tasked with finding a suitable buyer for both Olympic and Ambee Pharmaceuticals. The British chocolatier, Cadbury, was close to acquiring the family's shares and an acquisition agreement was also signed between the two parties. However, there was a discrepancy of USD 2-2.5 per share in the valuation of the company and the deal did not succeed. A local Bangladeshi business conglomerate also gave a purchase offer for the 2 companies, but that was also unsuccessful.

However, in 2023, the family reversed their decision to sell the company and instead started heavily investing in its expansion. Aziz was elected the chairman and his nephew, Samad Miraly, was made the executive director to run the company's operations. By 2026, the company spent more than BDT 3.6 billion in expanding the company by purchasing land, capital machinery, and increasing their capacity. They set up new production lines for noodles, chanachur, confectionaries, cakes, biscuits, and corrugated packaging. Olympic purchased land in upscale areas of Dhaka including Bashundhara, Tejgaon, and Purbachal. They plan on building a residential area in Purbachal, a commercial tower in Tejgaon, and a corporate head office in Bashundhara. This led to Aziz increasing his investment in Olympic by purchasing more than BDT 2 billion worth of shares from the market.

=== Ambee Films Ltd. ===
Ambee Films Ltd. is a defunct film production company owned by Aziz. The company produced around 50 films during its days of operation, including Chandni Raatey (directed by Ehtesham), the debut film of actress Shabnur. Through Ambee Films, Aziz brought numerous Indian film stars to Bangladesh including Rekha, Mamta Kulkarni, Moon Moon Sen, and Prosenjit.

== Wealth ==
The Bhai family is considered one of the oldest and richest industrial families in Bangladesh, having their business date back to the 1947 partition. Aziz's personal net worth has increased since 2023 as he has been on a share purchasing spree, buying more than BDT 2 billion worth of Olympic's shares from the stock market. This consolidated Aziz’s personal holding in the company to approximately 25%, amounting to almost BDT 8 billion. Aziz is also the owner of 60% of Ambee Pharmaceuticals Ltd., a publicly listed company with a market capitalisation of BDT 1.8 billion.

According to the Suisse Secrets, Aziz and his family members had 12 bank accounts in Swiss banks. The total amount deposited in all the accounts was 53 million Swiss francs (~BDT 8 billion). Along with Aziz, the family of his sister, Sakina Miraly, had 43 million Swiss francs (~BDT 6.5 billion) in 9 bank accounts, and his uncle, Mubarak Ali, had 10 million Swiss francs (~BDT 1.5 billion).

This consolidates Aziz's recorded personal wealth to more than BDT 17 billion. However, the figure may be higher because it does not take into account private investments and real estate holdings (like the hotel and resort businesses).

== Controversies ==
=== First arrest ===
Aziz was first arrested during the tenure of president Hussain Muhammad Ershad. He was later released after Prince Karim, Aga Khan IV, the 49th Imam of the Nizari community, came to Bangladesh and personally pushed for his release. The reason for the arrest is reported to have revolved around Mary Badruddin, who is said to have been a secret wife of president Ershad. After Aziz attempted to get close with Mary, president Ershad had him arrested.

=== Murder charges ===
Actor Sohel Chowdhury was killed on 18 December 1998 in front of Banani's Trumps Club, a nightclub co-owned by Aziz. On 30 July 1999, the Detective Branch of police pressed charges against Aziz along with the club's co-owners, Ashish Roy Chowdhury (Bottle Chowdhury) and Bunty Islam. The other suspects were underworld gangsters Sanjidul Islam Emon and Harun-ur-Rashid (Leather Liton) along with four others. According to the charge sheet, Sohel Chowdhury had a feud with Aziz regarding the club's late-night activities which were disturbing the adjacent Banani central mosque. Sohel, a member of the mosque management committee, tried to shut down the club in July 1998, around 5 months before the killing. Other theories speculate that Aziz and Sohel had a feud regarding a woman as both of them were pursuing her. While visiting the club with his girlfriend, Sohel Chowdhury got into a brawl with Aziz when he made attempts to get close to her. Sohel slapped Aziz in front of everybody at the club, which infuriated Aziz.

In April 2022, the erstwhile spokesperson of the Rapid Action Battalion, Khandaker Al Moin, stated in a press briefing that after this encounter, Aziz asked Bunty and Ashish Roy to "deal with Sohel". As the nightclub was frequented by underworld members Sanjidul Islam Emon, Leather Liton, and Tariq Sayeed Mamun (shot to death beside DMCH in November 2025), they also wanted to eliminate Sohel in order to protect their meeting place. Immediately after the shooting, Bunty Islam was arrested by the Detective Branch in January 1999. The proceedings of the trial were paused between 2004 and 2022 after one of the accused, Adnan Siddiqui, filed for a stay order. In 2022, the order was revoked.

Ashish Roy (Bottle Chowdhury) was arrested on 5 April 2022. He admitted under interrogation that Aziz ordered the hit on Sohel after Sohel and the Banani central mosque's committee attempted to shut the club down. On 9 May 2024, the High Court sentenced Aziz, Bunty Islam, and Adnan Siddiqui to life imprisonment. Ashish Roy Chowdhury, Tariq Sayeed Mamun, Faruk Abbasi, Sanjidul Islam Emon, Selim Khan, and Harun-ur-Rashid (Leather Liton) were acquitted. Bunty Islam and Adnan Siddiqui are currently absconding in Canada.

=== Espionage ===
In January 1999, Aziz was detained by the Special Branch of police on charges of spying and leaking state secrets. The SB reported that ATV, a defunct channel owned by Aziz, used to leak state secrets to foreign intelligence agencies under the guise of sharing video tapes of TV show recordings. Bangladesh's intelligence agencies grew suspicious of the channel after they broadcast some shows which allegedly distorted the history of the Bangladesh Liberation War. The police questioned Aziz regarding his relationship with Middle Eastern diplomats posted in Dhaka. Aziz was also accused of being involved in honey trapping. Inspector Nakib Zaman (the court inspector of the case) stated that "beautiful women" were used by Aziz to gather top-secret government intelligence and smuggle them out of the country in the form of TV show recordings. The former attorney general of Bangladesh K. S. Nabi represented Aziz as his legal counsel in this case.

He was booked under charges of espionage and conspiracy to overthrow the erstwhile government of Sheikh Hasina. Aziz was arrested and kept in custody for 3 months while the charges were being investigated. During the investigation, he accused his younger brother, Raja M. Bhai, of spying for foreign intelligence agencies. Raja was subsequently detained and taken into remand by Motijheel police.

=== Narcotics cases ===
In 2007, the Rapid Action Battalion seized 130,000 yaba pills along with raw materials to make yaba from the Bhai family residence in Gulshan. Aziz's nephew, Amin Hudda, was arrested and Aziz was probed in this case. Hudda, a Uganda-born Australian citizen, was one of the biggest drug lords of Bangladesh until his arrest. Along with the yaba pills, BDT 46 lakh and other foreign currency notes were also found during the raid. Illegal VoIP equipment worth over BDT 5 crore taka was found in the raid and it was discovered that Hudda had been running an illegal VoIP business from his residence. The Department of Narcotics Control reported that Hudda had been running drug businesses in the country since 1999-2000. He confessed that he learned the process of drug-making from an American expert named Neogate who visited Bangladesh.

The total seizure list made by the Rapid Action Battalion consisted of: 818 SIM cards, 1 viagra tablet, 139 bottles of foreign liquor, 5 cellphones, a pair of handcuffs, six computer CPUs, 1,900 US dollars, 100 Hong Kong dollars, 450 Euros, 2,500 Thai baht, INR 125 Indian rupees, 1 laptop, 1 switchgear, 2 channel boxes, 3 computer monitors, 2.5 litres orthophosphoric acid, 1 bottle dimethylethyl carbinol, and 10 tolas of gold. In 2012, Hudda was sentenced to 79 years in prison. This incident remains the largest drug seizure in Bangladeshi history.

In October 2019, the Department of Narcotics Control raided the Gulshan residence of the Bhai family again. They seized liquor bottles, poker chips, hookahs, and other casino equipment at the rooftop casino and bar of the residence. The department found 382 bottles of foreign alcohol, 200 grams of cannabis, and 24 cans of beer. Bhai's nephew, Ahad M. Bhai, was reported to be the owner of the bar in a confession given by the residence's caretaker. However, the Department of Narcotics Control filed 2 cases against Ahad's brother, Omar M. Bhai, instead of him. Omar denied on social media that he had any relation with the equipment found during the raid and claimed that these cases were being instigated by his aunt due to an internal family feud.

=== 1996 stock market crash ===
In 1999, the Bangladesh Securities and Exchange Commission filed cases against Olympic Industries PLC, Aziz, and his father Mohammad Bhai. They were accused of being involved in the 1996 Bangladesh stock market scam. Aziz and his father were reported to have extracted tens of millions of taka from the market by artificially inflating stock prices. In 1994, the company issued excessive rights shares after declaring their intention to build a cement factory. This led to the stock price of Olympic rising 44 times from BDT 124 to BDT 5,511. However, instead of building the cement factory, Olympic's directors then offloaded the shares in the open market, making crores from this pump and dump scheme. A special tribunal on the capital markets issued an arrest warrant against Aziz in the case in August 2018.

== Personal life ==
=== Family ===
Aziz was first married to a European woman with whom he has 1 daughter. After his divorce with her, Aziz married Naureen, daughter of his close friend Anwarul Islam Bobby (d. 1994). Bobby was one of the pioneers of the English press in Bangladesh, being the founder of many newspapers including The Daily Life and The Daily Morning Sun. Naureen has been running Aziz's businesses in his absence. She is the proprietor of Progoti Printing and Packaging and The Daily Morning Sun.

The couple has 2 sons and 2 daughters. In June 2023, Aziz's eldest son, Asar M. Bhai, was nominated by Aziz's holding company, Ambee Ltd., to serve in Olympic's board of directors. Ahad M. Bhai (a son of Aziz's brother Raja) also got appointed as a shareholder director. Aziz's cousin, Munir Ali (son of his uncle Mubarak Ali), also sits on the board. His younger sister's son, Samad Miraly, is the executive director of Olympic. Another nephew (son of his elder sister Nurjehan), Amin Hudda, died during his imprisonment for drug smuggling in 2020.

=== Public persona and mystique ===
Due to numerous criminal charges, connections with gangster figures, flamboyant lifestyle, friendships and feuds with some of Bangladesh's most powerful people, Aziz is regarded as a mafia don by many people. This is partly due to his surname. Bhai, literally meaning 'brother' in Bangla, is also used as a suffix to the names of those involved in mafia activities. This led to speculation that Aziz's surname may have come due to his connections with the underworld. However, this is untrue, as Bhai is the family's surname also used by female members of the family despite the word's masculine meaning in Bangla. Aziz is also rumoured to be connected with D-Company chief Dawood Ibrahim.
