= Tanvir Islam Joy =

Bangladeshi fugitive

Khandaker Tanvir Islam Joy
- Other name: Joy
- Citizenship: Bangladesh
- Known for: Alleged leadership of the Seven Star group

Khandaker Tanvir Islam Joy is a Bangladeshi national who has been wanted by Bangladeshi police in connection with several murders. Authorities have identified him as one of the leaders of the Seven Star group, a criminal gang based in Dhaka. In 2019, a joint investigation by Global News and The Daily Star reported allegations that he was living in Ajax, Ontario, Canada, under the name Md. Tarekh Rana. Rana has denied being Joy, and a Canadian investigation was closed for lack of evidence.

== Criminal allegations ==
Police have linked Joy to the Seven Star crime group. His first reported arrest was in 1999, when he was accused of posing as Sajeeb Wazed Joy, the son of Prime Minister Sheikh Hasina, to extort money from businesses in the Savar Export Processing Zone. A joint investigation by The Daily Star and Global News, published in December 2019, reported that Joy had been accused of extorting money from businesses, including real estate companies, cable television providers and shops.

In December 2001, the Ministry of Home Affairs published a list of 23 wanted criminals linked to the Seven Star and Five Star groups, including Joy, and offered rewards for information leading to their arrest. He was placed on Interpol's wanted list for murder and possession of explosives, and on the Bangladesh Police most-wanted list. Police accused his associates of a 2006 attack on Turki Associate, a travel agency, over unpaid protection money, in which two people were killed and four injured. He was also wanted in connection with the murder of Aftab Ahmed, a University of Dhaka professor, and a 2007 shooting at God Gift International Recruiting Agency.

In 2007, the Bangladesh Rifles gave India's Border Security Force a list of five wanted Bangladeshi criminals believed to be in India, including Joy. In May 2007, police in Kolkata arrested a man they said was Joy, according to Anandabazar Patrika. The man had Bangladeshi and Indian passports and ran a shop in Kolkata under the name Tareq Rana. In court, he identified himself as Md. Tarekh Rana, submitted documents in that name, and said he owned two businesses in India, Gaus Fashion and Zee Fashion. He was released in 2008, and Bangladeshi authorities continued to search for Joy.

In 2015, the Canada Border Services Agency investigated allegations that Joy had entered Canada using the identity of Md. Tarekh Rana. Canada Border Services Agency officers stated in an internal report that facial recognition had identified Rana as Joy. The investigation was eventually discontinued after officers determined that there were insufficient grounds for enforcement action. Rana denied being Joy and suggested that he may have been a victim of identity theft. He also maintained that Canadian authorities had cleared him, citing correspondence from the Royal Canadian Mounted Police indicating that his fingerprints could not be matched to an existing immigration file or criminal record.

In Canada, Rana opened a business in Ajax called SJ71 Limited and bought a home in Pickering. He had entered the country on a ten-year visitor visa and later obtained a work permit with help from the office of member of parliament Mark Holland. Global News reported that he had been photographed with several local and federal politicians, had donated to political parties and local charities, and had been named Entrepreneur of the Year by the Town of Ajax in 2018.

In May 2024, Prothom Alo reported claims that Joy had died in Malaysia in April 2024. The report has not been independently confirmed.
