= M. Mansur Ali =

Bangladeshi politician

Member of Bangladesh Parliament

Assembly Member for Khulna-13
- In office February 18, 1979 – 1990

Personal details
- Party: Jatiya Party (Ershad)
- Other political affiliations: Bangladesh Nationalist Party

M. Mansur Ali was a Jatiya Party (Ershad) politician and a former member of parliament for Satkhira-4.

== Career ==
Ali was elected to parliament from Satkhira-4 as a Jatiya Party candidate in 1988. He had served as the state minister of textiles in 1979.

== Death ==
Ali died in 2003.
