= Kazi Alauddin =

Bangladeshi politician

- কাজী আলাউদ্দিন

Member of Bangladesh Parliament
- In office 2001–2006
- Preceded by: Shahadat Hossain
- Succeeded by: HM Golam Reza

Personal details
- Born: 10 January 1953 (age 73) Kaliganj, Satkhira
- Party: Bangladesh Nationalist Party-BNP

Kazi Alauddin is a Bangladesh Nationalist Party-BNP politician and a former member of parliament of Satkhira-4.

== Career ==
Alauddin was elected to parliament from Satkhira-4 as a Bangladesh Jatiya Party candidate in 2008.
