= Pichchi Helal =

Pichchi Helal, born Imamul Hasan Helal, is a Bangladeshi gangster based in Dhaka. He was freed in August 2024 following which crime increased in his old turf of Mohammadpur.

== Career ==
Helal was the general secretary of the Bangladesh Jatiotabadi Chatra Dal Mohammadpur Thana unit. He served as the joint secretary of the Dhaka unit of Bangladesh Jatiotabadi Chatra Dal and the joint general secretary of the central committee of Bangladesh Jatiotabadi Chatra Dal. The government of Bangladesh placed him on a list of 23 top criminals of Bangladesh on 26 December 2001. It had declared a 50 thousand BDT reward for information leading to his capture.

Helal was involved in the murder of KM Ahmed Raju, ward commissioner of Dhaka, killed on 1 October 2002.

Two of Helal's accomplices were detained in 2020 by Rapid Action Battalion.

== Arrest ==
Helal was arrested on 12 January 2000. He was detained with Ershad and Mahbubul Haq Shafiq from Adabar, Dhaka after a gunfight.

Brigadier general Syed Iftekhar Uddin, Inspector General of Prisons, was threatened after he transferred Helal, Killer Abbas, and Khorshed Alam Rasu outside of Dhaka from Kashimpur Central Jail in June 2016.

=== Release ===
Helal was released after the Sheikh Hasina led Awami League government was overthrown on 5 August 2024. He got involved in crime again soon after his release. The Daily Star expressed concerns over public safety after he was accused of being involved in murder after his release. The Daily Star had noted the interim government had released 43 criminals and militants since assuming power including Killer Abbas, Sweden Aslam, Freedom Rasu (Khorshed Alam Rasu). A murder case was filed against him and 32 others on 23 September over the murder of two in Mohmmadpur. The two murders were part of an attempt to reestablish control over Muhammadpur by Helal.
