= S. M. Jaglul Hayder =

Bangladeshi politician

- এস. এম. জগলুল হায়দার

Member of Parliament

Personal details
- Born: 29 July 1963 (age 63)
- Party: Bangladesh Awami League

S. M. Jaglul Hayder (এস, এম, জগলুল হায়দার) is a Bangladesh Awami League politician and former Member of Parliament from Satkhira-4.

== Early life ==
Hayder was born on 29 July 1963. He has a B.A. degree.

== Career ==
Hayder was elected unopposed to Parliament on 5 January 2014 from Satkhira-4 as a Bangladesh Awami League candidate.
