= GM Abdul Haq =

Bangladeshi politician

Member of Bangladesh Parliament
- In office February 1996 – June 2001

Personal details
- Party: Bangladesh Nationalist Party

GM Abdul Haq is a Bangladesh Nationalist Party politician and a former member of parliament for Shatkhira-5.

== Career ==
Haq was elected to parliament from Shatkhira-5 as a Bangladesh Nationalist Party candidate in February 1996.
