= Sohel Chowdhury =

Bangladeshi film actor (1963–1998)

- সোহেল চৌধুরী
- Born: October 19, 1965; Banani, Dhaka
- Died: 18 December 1998 (aged 33); Dhaka, Bangladesh
- Cause of death: Gunshot wound
- Occupations: Film actor; businessman
- Years active: 1984–1996
- Spouse: Parvin Sultana Diti (m. 1986; div. 1995)
- Children: 2

Sohel Chowdhury (19 October 1965 – 18 December 1998) was a Bangladeshi film actor and businessman. He had made his debut in the Dhallywood with the film Bhai Bondhu (1986) directed by Darashiko.

== Early life ==
Sohel was born on 19 October 1965 on Banani, Dhaka. His father Tarek Ahmed Chowdhury and mother Nurjahan Begum. His ancestral home is in Chunarughat Habiganj District.

== Career ==
Sohel started his career in acting by winning the Bangladesh Film Development Corporation, talent hunt, Notun Mukher Sondhane, along with his future wife Parveen Sultana Diti. They acted together in Hiramoti which was an adaptation of a Punjabi story Heer-Ranjha. Sohel was moody, whose career was eclipsed by that of his wife, Diti, who had a more successful career. They also acted together in Chirodiner Sathi.

== Filmography ==
Year	Title	Role	Notes	Ref.
1986	Bhai Bondhu	Tonny	Debut film	
1987	Lokkhi Bodhu			
1987	Lady Smugglar		Urdu film	
1988	Heeramoti			
1989	Biroho Batha			
1990	Danga Fasad			
1994	Mohan Bondhu			
1995	Papi Shatru			
1995	Priyo Shatru	Ishtiaq		

== Personal life ==
In 1986, Chowdhury married actress Parveen Sultana Diti. They had won the Notun Mukher Sondhane, the talent contest of Bangladesh Film Development Corporation, in 1984 together. They had two children, Lamia Chowdhury (b. 1987) and Dipta Chowdhury (b. 1989). In 1995, Sohel and Diti were separated.

== Death ==
On 18 December 1998, Chowdhury was shot dead in front of Trumps Club at Abedin Tower, Banani, Dhaka. His brother, Touhidul Islam Chowdhury, filed a murder case at Gulshan Police Station. In January 1999, businessman Aziz Mohammad Bhai and Afakul Islam (aka Bunti Islam), the club owner, and 3 others were arrested on suspicion of the homicide. At the time of his death, his daughter Lamia was 11 years old, and his son Dipta was 9 years old.

In July 1999, Dhaka Metropolitan Police's Detective Branch filed a chargesheet in court against nine individuals, Aziz Mohammad, Bunti Islam, Ashish Roy Chowdhury (also known as Botol Chowdhury), Sanjidul Islam Emon, Adnan Siddiqui, Tariq Sayeed Mamun, Selim Khan, Harun Ur Rashid (also known as Leather Liton) and Farooq Abbasi. According to the complaint, Sohel Chowdhury verbally abused Aziz Mohammad during an altercation over a supposed female friend at the club a few months prior. And this eventually led to the killing of Chowdhury as an act of revenge. In October 2001, Dhaka's 3rd Additional Metropolitan Sessions Judge's Court framed charges against them.

In 2004, following a petition filed by an accused, Adnan Siddiqui, the High Court stayed the trial proceedings but the order was vacated in 2015.

In March 2008, Sanjidul Islam Emon admitted that members of his gang shot dead film actor Sohel Chowdhury although he was not present at the scene.

On 14 February 2022, High Court directed to retrieve the missing documents regarding the case. On 27 February, the stay on the trial proceedings was withdrawn by Dhaka Speedy Trial Tribunal-2 and on 20 March, arrest warrants were issued against six individuals. Ashish Roy Chowdhury was arrested on 5 April in Dhaka by Rapid Action Battalion while he was as trying to flee to Canada.

As of April 2022, Aziz Mohammad, Bunty and Adnan live in Thailand, Canada and the United States respectively. Tariq Sayeed Mamun, Leather Liton and Farooq Abbasi are in prison. And Selim is in hiding.
