= Union councils of Jessore District =

Union councils of Jessore District (Bengali: যশোর জেলার ইউনিয়ন পরিষদসমূহ) are the smallest rural administrative and local government units in Jessore District of Bangladesh. There are 8 upazilas in Jessore district with 00 Union councils. The list are below:

== Abhaynagar Upazila ==
Abhaynagar Upazila has 8 unions, 000 mauzas, and 000 villages.

- Baghutia Union
- Chalishia Union
- Payra Union
- Prambag Union
- Shubharara Union
- Siddhipasha Union
- Sreedharpur Union
- Sundoli Union

== Bagherpara Upazila ==
Bagherpara has 9 Unions/Wards, 156 Mauzas/Mahallas, and 191 villages. Unions Name

- Johorpur Union
- Bandobila Union
- Raipur Union
- Narikelbaria Union
- Dhalgram Union
- Dohakula Union
- Dorajhat Union
- Basuari Union
- Jamdia Union

== Chaugachha Upazila ==
Chowgacha Union has 11 Unions/Wards, 149 Mauzas/Mahallas, and 166 villages.

- Fulsara Union
- Pashapole Union
- Singhajhuli Union
- Dhuliani Union
- Chaugachha Union
- Jagadishpur Union
- Patibila Union
- Hakimpur Union
- Swarupdaha Union
- Narayanpur Union
- Sukhpukuria Union

== Jhikargacha Upazila ==
Jhikargacha Upazila has 11 unions, 164 mouzas and 179 villages.

- Ganganandapur Union
- Magura Union
- Shimulia Union
- Gadkhali Union
- Panisara Union
- Jhikargacha Union
- Nabharan Union
- Nirbaskhola Union
- Hajirbag Union
- Shankarpur Union
- Bankra Union

== Keshabpur Upazila ==
Keshabpur Upazila has 11 union parishads, 142 mouzas and 143 villages.

- Trimohini Union
- Sagardari Union
- Majidpur Union
- Bidyanandakati Union
- Mongolkot Union
- Keshabpur Union
- Panjia Union
- Sufalakati Union
- Gaurighona Union
- Satbaria Union
- Hasanpur Union

== Jessore Sadar Upazila ==
Jessore Sadar Upazila has 9 union parishads, 142 mouzas and 143 villages.

- Arabpur Union
- Basundia Union
- Chanchra Union
- Churamankati Union
- Deara Union
- Fatepur Union
- Haibatpur Union
- Ichhali Union
- Kachua Union
- Kashimpur Union
- Lebutala Union
- Narendrapur Union
- Noapara Union
- Ramnagar Union
- Upashahar Union

== Manirampur Upazila ==
- Bhojgati Union
- Chaluahati Union
- Dhakuria Union
- Durbadanga Union
- Haridaskati Union
- Hariharnagar Union
- Jhanpa Union
- Kashimnagar Union
- Khanpur Union
- Khedapara Union
- Kultia Union
- Manirampur Union
- Maswimnagar Union
- Monoharpur Union
- Nehalpur Union
- Rohita Union
- Shyamkur Union

== Sharsha Upazila ==
- Bagachra Union
- Bahadurpur Union
- Benapole Union
- Dihi Union
- Goga Union
- Kayba Union
- Lakshmanpur Union
- Nizampur Union
- Putkhali Union
- Sharsha Union
- Ulshi Union
