= 2024 Bangladesh anti-Hindu violence =

Violence against Hindus in Bangladesh

- Part of the post-resignation violence and the Aftermath of the July Uprising
- Location: Bangladesh
- Target: Hindus of Bangladesh
- Attack type: Attacks on homes, looting, arson, temple vandalism, killings, abuse of women
- Weapons: Cleavers, sticks, sharp weapons, petrol/octane
- Deaths: 3 Hindus (August to December, according to Ain o Salish Kendra); 5 Hindus (according to Bangladesh Hindu Buddhist Christian Unity Council)
- Perpetrators: Outlawed Islamist parties and organizations; Local criminal gangs; Awami League (in some cases); Bangladesh Nationalist Party (BNP) (in some cases); Hindus (in some cases)
- Defenders: Local Hindu community; Hindu rights activists (e.g., Bangladesh Sanatani Jagarana Mancha); Students and Muslim community members; Students Against Discrimination; Bangladesh Nationalist Party (BNP) activists; Bangladesh Army; Bangladesh Police
- Motive: Islamic extremism; Anti-Hindu sentiment; Anti-Awami League sentiment; Communalism; Politicide; Deterioration of law and order
- 2,010 incidents of violence reported (as of 20 August 2024); 152 temples damaged (as of 20 August 2024); 157 families' homes and businesses damaged

Following the resignation of Sheikh Hasina on 5 August 2024, attacks began on Hindus in Bangladesh, with Hindu homes, businesses and places of worship being targeted en masse. The Bangladesh Hindu Buddhist Christian Unity Council reported that from 4 to 20 August, a total of 2,010 incidents (including 69 temples) of attacks on minorities took place across the country within this 16-day period.

Among the incidents, the homes of 157 families were attacked, looted, vandalised and set on fire while some of their businesses were also attacked, looted and vandalised. Five Hindus were killed in these attacks, of which at least two were confirmed as Awami League members. According to a UN Human Rights Office report, these abuses also affected Ahmadiyya Muslims, Hindus, and indigenous people from the Chittagong Hill Tracts.

== Background ==
In July 2024, the quota reform movement morphed into a fierce anti-government non-cooperation movement, known as the July Uprising, ultimately removed the Awami League government from state power with the resignation of Sheikh Hasina who was accused of fostering authoritarianism, corruption and democratic backsliding. Various violence took place against the Hindu minority of Bangladesh after the political unrest. Various people from the Hindu background were affected by the mob violence.

== Attacks ==
Following Hasina's departure, a series of communal attacks were reported, particularly targeting Hindus in Bangladesh. These incidents included alleged attacks on temples, houses, and shops belonging to minority communities, as well as reports of looting and murder across several districts in the country.

According to the investigation conducted by Prothom Alo correspondents across 64 districts and 67 upazilas between 5–20 August 2024, 1,068 attacks on the minority community occurred in 49 districts. The majority of the attacks occurred in the southwestern division of Khulna, where at least 295 homes and businesses belonging to minority communities were destroyed. In addition, 219 structures were damaged in Rangpur, 183 in Mymensingh, 155 in Rajshahi, 79 in Dhaka, 68 in Barishal, 45 in Chattogram, and 25 in Sylhet. The extent of the damage varied, with some areas experiencing severe destruction, while others sustained less significant harm. Two members of the Hindu community were killed in the violence, and a total of 912 attacks were documented. Of these, in at least 506 cases, the victims were affiliated with Awami League. Correspondents from Prothom Alo personally observed 546 damaged houses and businesses, accounting for 51 percent of the total damaged structures.

Minority groups in Bangladesh reported 2,010 incidents of communal violence across the country between 4–20 August 2024. 1,705 families were directly affected in the violence. Among them, 157 families had their homes and businesses were attacked, looted, vandalized, and set on fire. Lands of some of the families were forcibly occupied. 9 people died in the violence. An investigation published on 30 October by Netra News found that none of the murders bore clear signs of religious or communal motives. Instead, a mix of political retribution, mob violence, and criminal homicides was behind the incidents involving the seven deaths. Additionally, some cases, the Unity Council's assertions were undercut by the very news reports they cited and by their own grassroots officials.

According to sources from the police headquarters, following the fall of the Awami League government, between 5 and 9 August, there have been 47 incidents surrounding puja mandaps (pandals), including the vandalism of 30 idols and temples, 4 thefts or robberies, 3 arson attacks, and 10 other incidents. According to Bangladesh Police, 35 untoward incidents related to Durga Puja in Bangladesh since 1 October. 17 persons have been arrested and about a dozen cases registered.

Samakal analyzed 296 incidents of communal violence against Hindu communities and found 135 to be true.

At a press conference organized by the Bangladesh Chhatra Oikya Parishad, an organization representing the minority community, it was claimed that 49 teachers from the minority community have been forced to resign between 5 and 31 August.

An OHCHR report described the violence against Hindus to be motivated by "religious & ethnic discrimination, revenge against Awami League supporters, local communal disputes over land & interpersonal issues."

After the visit of India's foreign secretary on 9 December 2024, the interim Bangladeshi government stated that it had arrested 77 people in connection to 88 cases registered for violence against Hindus. Indian Minister of External Affairs (MoS), Kirti Vardhan Singh stated in the Lok Sabha that between 26 November 2024 and 25 January 2025, 76 incidents of anti-Hindu violence took place. Since Hasina's resignation, 23 Hindus were killed and 152 Hindu temples were desecrated. The claim of 23 Hindus killed was later refuted by the police.

In January 2026, the acting general secretary of the Bangladesh Hindu Buddhist Christian Unity Council stated that between August and November 2024, 82 Hindus were killed and the total number of reported "atrocities" during the same period amounted to 2,673.

=== Khulna Division ===
The highest number of attacks occurred in the Khulna Division, with 74 homes and businesses destroyed in the Khulna district between 5–20 August, followed by Jashore, Satkhira, and Magura. On the night of 5 August, an attack was launched on Bejpara, a neighborhood in Jashore town where at least 200 Hindu families reside.

On 6 August, a retired schoolteacher, Mrinal Kanti Chatterjee, was killed in Bagerhat Sadar Upazila. In Jashore, 50 Hindu houses were attacked, torched, looted, and robbed at various locations.

In Meherpur, nine Hindu houses were attacked, including one belonging to an Awami League leader. Several thousand people vandalized at least 25 shops and looted goods in Narkelbaria Bazar of Bagharpara Upazila. Twenty to twenty-five Hindu houses were vandalized and looted in five villages of Dhalgram Union Parishad in Bagharpara Upazila in four separate occasions. Minority-owned homes and businesses in Koyra Upazila of Khulna District were looted.

On 21 September, multiple temples in Dacope Upazila of Khulna have repeatedly received anonymous letters via mail addressed to the temple's Puja celebration committees. The letters state, "To celebrate Durga Puja, each temple must pay a donation of five lakh taka." Along with this, the letters issue a threat: anyone who informs the authorities or the press will be killed. The committee decided to cancel the Durga Puja. The content of the letters sent to the three temples is almost identical.

=== Rangpur Division ===
The second largest number of attacks occurred in Rangpur Division. The minority communities in the districts of Lalmohirhat, particularly Kaliganj Upazilla, Hatibandha Upazila, Panchagarh, Dinajpur, Laxmipur within this division were particularly targeted.

In Phulbari, Kurigram, a 16-year-old schoolgirl was abducted. Locals report that at the beginning of September, a letter was posted on a tree in the Hindu neighborhood, stating, "This house's girl will be taken away and converted to Islam." Later, on 4 September, Ranjit Chandra Sen filed a general diary in the Phulbari Police Station. Locals also report that on Wednesday, around 5 p.m., while she was returning home from a coaching center, Alinur Rahman and his accomplices abducted her.

It was alleged that on 22 November, a chartered bus, en route from Rajarhat in Kurigram District to a rally in Rangpur organized by the Bangladesh Sanatan Jagaran Jote to raise the demands of the Hindu community, was attacked in Kaunia. Thirty people were injured.

=== Mymensingh Division ===
Attacks against homes, businesses and places of worship occurred in Netrakona and Mymensingh's Dhobaura Upazila, with fewer incidents being reported in Sherpur and Jamalpur. While multiple Hindu-owned shops were looted and vandalized in Netrakona town.

On the night of 1 September, a community temple in Vayadanga Bazaar, Ranisimul Union, Sreebardi Upazila, Sherpur District, was vandalized, with idols being damaged. Although petrol was sprayed after the vandalism, the intervention of police and army personnel prevented the fire from being ignited.

=== Chittagong Division ===
Mobs in Hatiya Upazila of Noakhali District attacked three houses and four businesses belonging to Hindus. In Chandpur District, the homes of school principals Ratan Kumar Mazumder in Chandpur town and Haripad Das in Faridganj Upazila were attacked. In the Comilla District, the Durga idol was damaged and the donation box at the temple was looted.

On 21 September, idols were vandalized at a Durga Puja Mandap in Ramganj, Lakshmipur. The president of the Bangladesh Youth Unity Council, Shimul Saha, said, "In Ramganj, children were incited and used to carry out the attack and vandalism of idols." Additionally, there were reports of attacks on Hindu homes in a village near Chattogram, according to witnesses and the relatives of those affected.

On 1 November, Sanatan Jagaran Manch proclaimed a protest rally against attacks on Hindus, vandalism and arson of temples, and looting of property in Chattogram. The police barred the Hindus from joining the rally. Liakat Ali Khan, Deputy Commissioner, Chattogram Metropolitan Police (South), said, "As per administrative orders, we hindered them from holding the rally." On 31 August, a sedition case was filed at Kotwali Police Station against 19 persons, including Sanatan Jagaran Manch spokesperson Chinmoy Krishna Das.

=== Dhaka Division ===
A group of 100–150 people, led by BNP leader Azizul Haque, attacked a Hindu household in Dhamrai Upazila. Two private cars were vandalized along with furniture from the house and the temple. Two Hindu-owned shops were looted in Sadarpur Upazila. In Shariatpur, miscreants destroyed the Dhakua Manasa Bari temple and attempted to attack Hindu homes, but the assault was thwarted by the arrival of the Army.

On 30 August, in Kaliakair Upazila of Gazipur, there was an attempt to seize a temple and Hindu land. BNP leader Lebu Mia, accompanied by 50–60 hired thugs, attacked and vandalized the 'Radhagobind Loknath Natmandir'. When the Hindu community attempted to resist, they were also assaulted, resulting in 10–12 injuries. Additionally, there was an attack on a house within the temple complex. Regarding this incident, Kaliakair Upazila Executive Officer (UNO) Kawsar Ahmed stated that the army and police were promptly notified of the attack on the temple.

On the night of 11 October, an object resembling a Molotov cocktail was thrown at the Durga Puja pandal in Dhaka's Tantibazar. People chased the perpetrators, who would then injure four people by stabbing them in an effort to escape. On 14 October, During the visarjan (immersion) of the Hindu idols, some extremists started throwing bricks at the Hindus from the roof of a building in old Dhaka. When some Hindus tried to go up to the building to stop them from throwing the bricks, the police prevented the Hindus from going up. In this incident, two Hindus were injured.

On 17 November, accusing a Hindu youth of having a romantic relationship with a Muslim teenage girl in Karimganj, he was severely beaten in the presence of the army. When taken to 'PAH Medical College Hospital,' the on-duty doctor declared him dead.

On 7 December, the Shri Shri Mahabhagya Lakshmi Narayan Temple in the Turag area was set on fire by pouring petrol or octane. The fire burned the idols inside the temple and goods worth approximately 1 lakh taka.

=== Barisal Division ===
The residence of Kalapara mayor Bipul Chandra was attacked around 5:00 p.m. In Gournadi Upazila of Barisal District, miscreants looted a Hindu-owned clothing store and assaulted a Hindu school teacher in her home. Additionally, arsonists attempted to set fire to the home of a prominent Hindu businessman in Barisal city, but the attempt was thwarted by local residents.

On 8 August, an attack and looting took place at Hindu household in Patuakhali Sadar Upazila. In Madhukhali Upazila of Faridpur District, miscreants targeted several homes and businesses, damaged a Kali temple, and assaulted a Hindu homeopathy doctor.

On 21 October, a group of people attempted to seize the land of 21 Hindu families in Patuakhali town. A Hindu family in Kalapara Upazila of Patuakhali was threatened with eviction from the country after confiscating their land. One of the victim alleged Kalapara Upazila BNP Secretary Hafizur Rahman Chunnu for land grabbing.

=== Rajshahi Division ===
On 4 August, the house of Suranjit Sarkar, the General Secretary of the Puja Celebration Committee of Mohanpur Upazila in Rajshahi, was vandalized, looted, and set on fire. The residence of a Hindu shopkeeper was also attacked.

On 5 and 6 August, incidents of vandalism, arson, and looting took place in at least 24 homes and businesses of the minority community in various areas of Naogaon town and district. Among the victims, 10 people are involved in Awami League politics, while 14 incidents occurred involving individuals who are not affiliated with Awami League politics. On 5 August, in the Vidyadharpur village of Mohanpur Upazila, 25 houses and the central temple of Mohanpur upazila were attacked. Members of the Hindu community reported that the attackers broke everything during their procession. Since the incidence, the residents of Vidyadharpur say they have been living in fear. an attack occurred in Pyarpur village, Mohanpur Upazila, within the district.

In Natore District, miscreants vandalized and looted six houses as well as the Jotdaiboki Shib and Kali Temple, which belong to the Hindu community. The attackers struck Ronendranath with a sharp weapon, leaving him severely injured and bleeding.

On 24 August, three temples in Bagha, Rajshahi, were attacked. Items and idols in the temples located in Pakuria Palpara, Ghoshpara of Pakuria Union, and Kaligram of Bagha Municipality were vandalized. During the vandalism, a madrasa student named Bappi Hossain was caught red-handed. On 5 October, idols at the Durga Mandir in Jayanagar, Bottola Haat, within the Chapainawabganj municipal area, were vandalized.

In Sujanagar, Pabna, idols were desecrated at two of the 51 temples where Durga Puja celebrations were planned in the upazila. On the night of 28 September, four idols were damaged at the Rishipara Barowari Puja Mandap in Sujanagar Municipality. On the following Tuesday night, five idols were vandalized at the Manikdi Palpara Barowari Puja Mandap. On 8 November, at 10 p.m., a group of people armed with local weapons attacked the Charjot Protap Durga Mata Thakurani temple in Shibtala Karmakarpara area of Chapainawabganj town.

== Misinformation ==
BBC News, Deutsche Welle, France 24 and some fact-checking websites highlighted several rumors circulated on X and other social media platforms.

In December 2024, a Sufi shrine was destroyed by locals of Sirajganj. The incident went viral on social media, falsely labeled as the destruction of a Hindu temple.

In January 2025, misinformation was spread online claiming Hindus were banned from having any government jobs. The Interim government press wing refuted the claim, saying "The Bangladesh government does not discriminate against any citizen based on religion."

In May 2025, the video of a man beaten by a crowd was circulated on social media as a communal attack on a Hindu businessman. Fact checkers confirmed the video was from April and that the man was a Muslim, who was a robber caught by locals and beaten.

In September 2024, the Bangladesh Hindu Buddhist Christian Unity Council said that the deaths of 9 Hindu men were motivated by anti-Hindu sentiment. An investigation carried out by Netra News claimed that the killings were not motivated by religious reasons. According to police investigations, 98.4% of the reported cases of attacks on minorities between 5 and 20 August were due to political reasons.

In February 2025, the Bangladesh Hindu Buddhist Christian Unity Council also appealed to the Bangladesh government to investigate the deaths of 23 individuals, labelling these as minority persecution. Chief adviser's deputy press secretary, Abul Kalam Azad Majumder refuted this. He claimed that out of 22 deaths seven were robbery and theft, four related to personal affairs, three were general crimes like rape, death due to heavy drinking, one from fights between two parties over sarcastic remarks, two due to accidents, two due to business rivalry, one due to clashes with locals, one due to a land dispute, and one suicide. In March 2025, Independent fact checker BanglaFact said that the Bangladesh Hindu Buddhist Christian Unity Council claim of 11 minority killings (among 92 incidents of violence against minorities) in January and February 2025 was incorrect . Numerous India-based social media accounts circulated several misleading videos and images about attacks on Bangladeshi Hindus, which were subsequently debunked by several fact-checking organizations. A false report also claimed that the house of Bangladeshi Hindu cricketer Liton Das had been set on fire, which was later debunked. Das himself refuted the claim in a Facebook post.

Quoting BJP leader and current Chief Minister of West Bengal Suvendu Adhikari, several Indian media channels claimed that more than 10 million Bangladeshi Hindus were heading towards India to seek refuge, adding that Bangladesh is becoming an "Islamic state". In an interview given to Al Jazeera, Bangladeshi political analyst Zahed Ur Rahman stated that that Indian media viewed the situation in Bangladesh through "their Islamophobic eye", despite the view in Bangladesh that it was a popular movement.

BNP leader Gayeshwar Chandra Roy also refuted claims made by Indian media that his party is anti-Hindu, asserting that the BNP has been inclusive of all communities in Bangladesh and has consistently supported all religious groups.

Gobinda Pramanik, former president of the Bangladesh National Hindu Grand Alliance, criticized the Indian media, suggesting that they inaccurately portrayed the situation. Pramanik, who was expelled from the organization, become the president of the same organization again after the fall of Sheikh Hasina's government. Later on 7 August, the general secretary of the same organisation, Dr. Mrityunjoy Kumar Roy, stated that Pramanik's statement to the media was false and "extremely insulting and shameful" for the Hindu community of the country and urged him to publicly apologize.

== Reactions ==
=== Domestic ===
Hindu community demonstrating in Rangpur

Hindu community demonstrating at Shahbagh, Dhaka

The looting and fear of looting of Hindu houses has caused Hindus to attempt to flee. On 7 August, around 700–800 Hindus in Thakurgaon District attempted to leave Bangladesh for India but returned home after promises of safety from Bangladeshi authorities. On 8 August, 300 Hindus congregated at a border post across from West Bengal's Jalpaiguri district before dispersing. On 10 August, another 500–600 Hindus gathered at the border in Hatibandha Upazila of Lalmonirhat district attempting to flee into India but were stopped by India's Border Security Force (BSF) and the Border Guard Bangladesh (BGB). An Awami League leader was said by locals to have spread rumors, urging local Hindus to gather at the border with India and engage with Indian leaders who were expected to arrive there. Several thousand Hindus assembled at the border before they were dispersed by the BGB and local police.

Starting on 9 August Hindu organisations-led protests across Bangladesh against the violence. Large protests took place in Shahbag in Dhaka for two consecutive days. On 10 August a large rally took place in Chittagong to call for an end to the violence. On 11 August further protests were reported from Tangail, Jamalpur, Moulvibazar, and Bogra. The demonstrators demanded action against the attackers of Hindu temples and properties as well as a 10% for minority communities in seats of the Jatiya Sangsad, formating of foundations for minority religions, return of property seized under the Vested Property Act and a five-day holiday for Durga Puja.

There were also some instances reported of students and members of the Muslim community, including BNP activists and madrasa students standing guard at temples and churches. The coordinators of the Students Against Discrimination distanced themselves from the attacks and pleaded with the people not to carry out such attacks. On 13 August, Chief Adviser Muhammad Yunus, visited the Dhakeshwari Temple to reassure Hindus that they are equal citizens in Bangladesh. Yunus said that attacks on minority Hindus were "exaggerated", and also claimed that the attacks on minorities were more political than communal.

Bangladesh Jamaat-e-Islami condemned the attack against Hindus, saying there is nothing called majority or minority and that every citizen has equal rights.

On 4 September, mass protest for safety of Hindus held in Shaheed Minar, Dhaka.

On 25 October, the Bangladesh Sanatan Jagaran Manch, an organization of the Hindu community, held a mass rally at Laldighi Maidan in Chattogram city with an eight-point demand. With slogans like "Āmār māṭi āmār mā, ē dēś chēṛē kōthāō jābô nā (My land, my mother, I will not leave this country)," Hindu men and women joined the rally in groups and processions. The main speaker, Chinmoy Krishna Das, further stated,

No democratic power in Bangladesh will have the opportunity to do politics by practicing communal behavior. Power is shifting repeatedly, and stability is not coming to this country. This is because tolerance is vanishing. Respect is being lost; teachers are being forced to resign. Only for being a minority, 93 people have been dismissed from police jobs. Hindus are being identified at the Veterinary and Chattogram University. For a while, such wrongful acts had subsided, but now they are resurfacing. We will remain silent no longer.

On 1 November, when the Sanatan Jagaran Manch announced a protest rally in Chattogram, police prevented Hindus from joining the gathering. The Deputy Commissioner (South) of the city police, Liakat Ali Khan, stated that, in line with administrative directives, they were barred from holding the rally today. On 31 August, a sedition case was filed at Kotwali Police Station against 19 people, including the spokesperson of Sanatan Jagaran Manch, Chinmoy Krishna Das.

Recalling the events of 25 October, Gauranga Das Brahmachari, a key organizer of the Sanatan Jagaran Manch, said,

We concluded the largest peaceful rally in recent memory with full discipline. However, a certain group does not appreciate this peace and the country's progress. They want communal violence in this country; they want colonial superpowers to interfere in Bangladesh and turn it into a militant state. They have tried to unjustly blame our movement.

In December 2024, Hindu Buddhist Christian Welfare Front rallied against Indian aggression for its Anti-Bangladesh propaganda. Bijan Kanti Sarker stated that Hindus, Buddhists, and Christians in Bangladesh have been subjected to various forms of oppression and humiliation during the rule of the Awami League. He further said that attacks on Hindu household were propagated against Jamaat-BNP activists. He further called for an end to such "propaganda and terrorist activities" while urging the Indian government to foster mutual understanding and respect based on humanity than religions.

==== Expatriates ====
On 11 August, in Birmingham, expatriates from Bangladesh's minority communities held a protest rally in front of the Assistant High Commission of Bangladesh, protesting against "attacks on temples and churches" and the "persecution" of minorities in Bangladesh.

In front of the Houses of Parliament and the BBC's headquarters, expatriates held placards and banners with writings such as "Protect Hindus," "Hindu Lives Matter," and "Justice for Hindus" while chanting slogans. Expatriate Ajit K. Saha alleged, "The BBC has published biased news on the recent incidents in Bangladesh. They have never highlighted the incidents of oppression against Hindus." Protesters submitted a letter of protest to the BBC newsroom, drawing attention to the lack of coverage on the recent suffering of Hindus in Bangladesh.

On 10 August, expatriate Bangladeshis held a rally in downtown Toronto. Foreigners also participated alongside Bangladeshis. Canadian Member of Parliament Kevin Vuong, representative of the World Hindu Council Abhishek Choubey, and former president of the Canadian Hindu Chamber of Commerce Naresh Chawda attended the rally to show solidarity. Many also called for using "Canada's influence" to support international measures for the protection of Hindus in Bangladesh. They suggested that "a process could be implemented to grant express visas to Bangladeshi Hindus seeking asylum in Canada."

On Sunday morning, more than 300 Indian Americans and Bangladeshi-origin Hindus gathered at Sugar Land City Hall in Houston. They called on the Biden administration to take immediate action to prevent atrocities and ensure the protection of minority communities in Bangladesh. Dipti Mahajan, co-coordinator of the organization HinduPACT, stated in her speech that "10 million Hindus are sitting on a ticking time bomb of genocide." From Michigan to Houston and from California to Washington, D.C., Indian and Bangladeshi Americans gathered with placards like "Protect Hindu Rights," "Religion is not a crime," "Live and Let Live," etc., in solidarity with their "Hindu brothers and sisters."

India condemned what it described as a "systematic pattern of desecration" after attacks on minorities and temples in Bangladesh. Indian Foreign Minister S. Jaishankar told parliament:

What was particularly worrying was that minorities, their businesses and temples also came under attack at multiple locations. The full extent of this is still not clear.

=== Individuals ===
==== Donald Trump ====
Condemning the violence against religious minorities in Bangladesh, former US President Donald Trump wrote,

I strongly condemn the barbaric violence against Hindus, Christians, and other minorities who are getting attacked and looted by mobs in Bangladesh, which remains in a total state of chaos.

==== Baroness Sandip Verma ====
In a letter sent to UK Prime Minister Keir Starmer, Baroness Sandip Verma of Leicester, a member of the House of Lords, wrote:

I am writing to you about serious concerns that have been raised with me from family and friends and community organisations, of the vicious attacks by gangs on the Hindu community and other minority communities in Bangladesh, religious places of worship, businesses and homes have been burnt down, with untold violence on innocent people taking place with little police intervention. There needs to be immediate public condemnation of these crimes, the Chief Adviser to the Interim Government of Bangladesh, Mr Muhammad Yunus, must order the full force of the law and the courts in bringing the perpetrators of these heinous crimes to book. Whilst UK is a strong ally of Bangladesh, the persecution and attacks on the Hindu and other minority communities cannot be allowed to continue and ask that this matter is raised immediately at the highest levels.

==== Pierre Poilievre ====
In a statement Canadian Conservative Leader Pierre Poilievre said On The Situation In Bangladesh:

"Conservatives stand with the people of Bangladesh during this difficult time. We are very concerned about the hundreds killed and thousands injured during student-led protests and horrified by the subsequent violence against religious minorities, including Hindus and Christians, who are being senselessly targeted by violent mobs.

"We condemn the violations of human rights by the authorities in Bangladesh and condemn all instances of violence against innocent and peaceful people.

"We call for the restoration of democracy and the rule of law, ensuring all Bengalis are protected and enjoy equal citizenship. We call for justice for the murdered and the persecuted, and an end to the violence against Bangladesh's religious minorities.

"During this time of transition in government, we call for calm and stability and stand with all Canadian Bengalis whose families and loved ones face danger and uncertainty. "Conservatives will continue to advocate for democracy, freedom, human rights and the rule of law."

==== Vivek Ramaswamy ====
Vivek Ramaswamy said in an X (formerly Twitter) post:

The targeted violence against Hindus in Bangladesh is wrong, it's concerning.

==== Pawan Kalyan ====
Pawan Kalyan's appeal to UN:

The recent visuals & pictures from Bangladesh are heart wrenching and concerning. I call upon the @UNHumanRights @UN_HRC and Bangladesh High Commission in India to take immediate necessary action and restore peace and order in Bangladesh. I pray for the safety, security and stability to all minorities and Hindus in Bangladesh.

==== Bob Blackman ====
British MP Bob Blackman, while addressing the Parliament, mentioned the incidents of arson attacks on the homes and temples of Hindus, stating:

Now, right now, Mr Speaker, the International Society of Krishna Consciousness, who run Bhaktaventa Manor in Elstree, the largest Hindu temple in this country, in Bangladesh, their spiritual leader is under arrest. Hindus across Bangladesh are being subject literally to death by their houses being burnt, their temples are being burnt. And there was an attempt today in the Bangladesh High Court to rule that ISKCON should be banned from the country. This is a direct attack on Hindus. Now this is a threat from India now to take action. We have a responsibility because we enabled Bangladesh to be free and independent.

== See also ==
- 2025 Bangladesh anti-Hindu violence
- Persecution of Hindus in Bangladesh
- Bangladesh post-resignation violence (2024–2026)
- Hazari Lane violence
- Freedom of religion in Bangladesh
- Human rights in Bangladesh
- Towhidi Janata
