= Keshabpur, Jessore =

Keshabpur কেশবপুর
- Town & Municipality
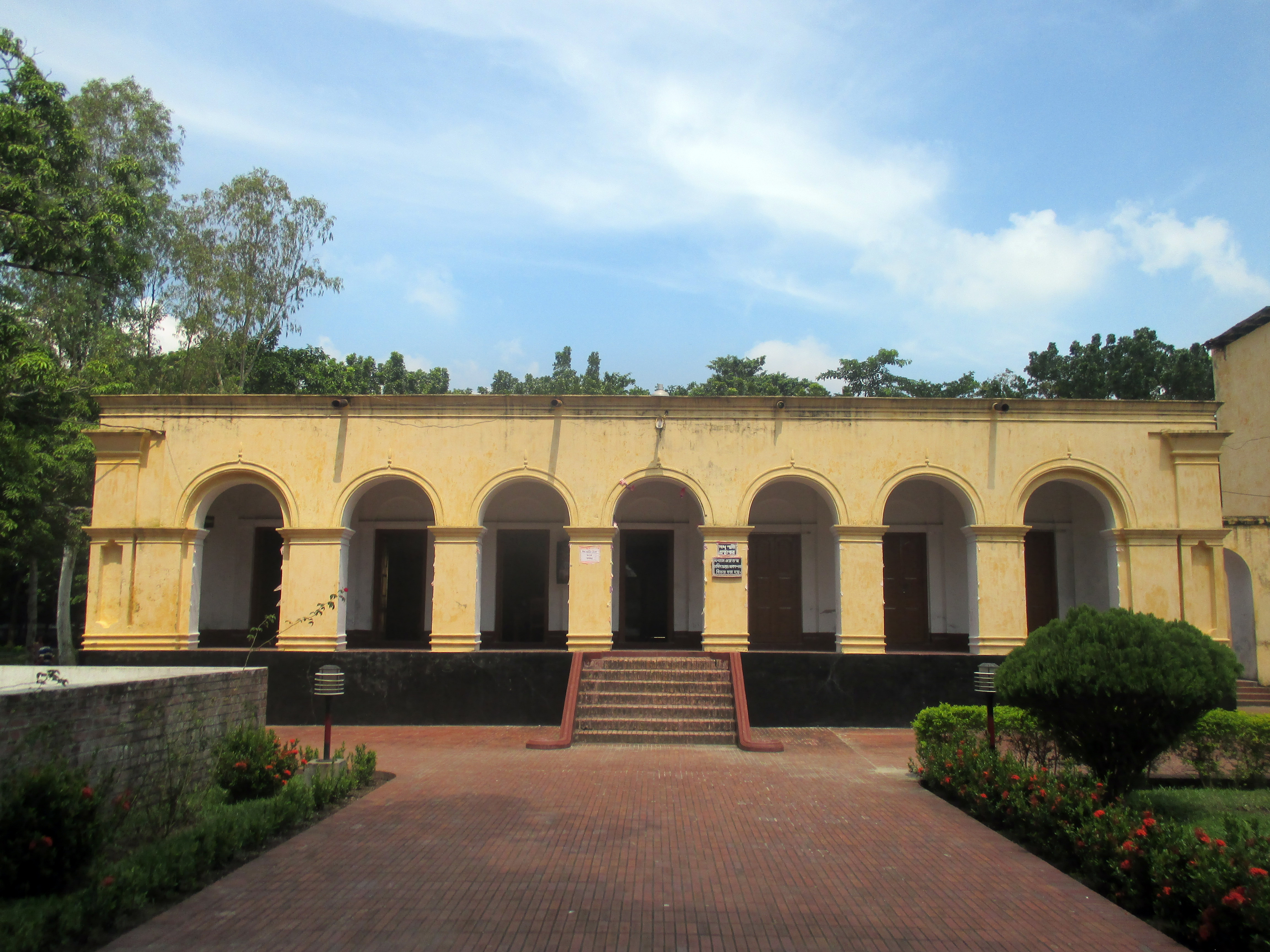
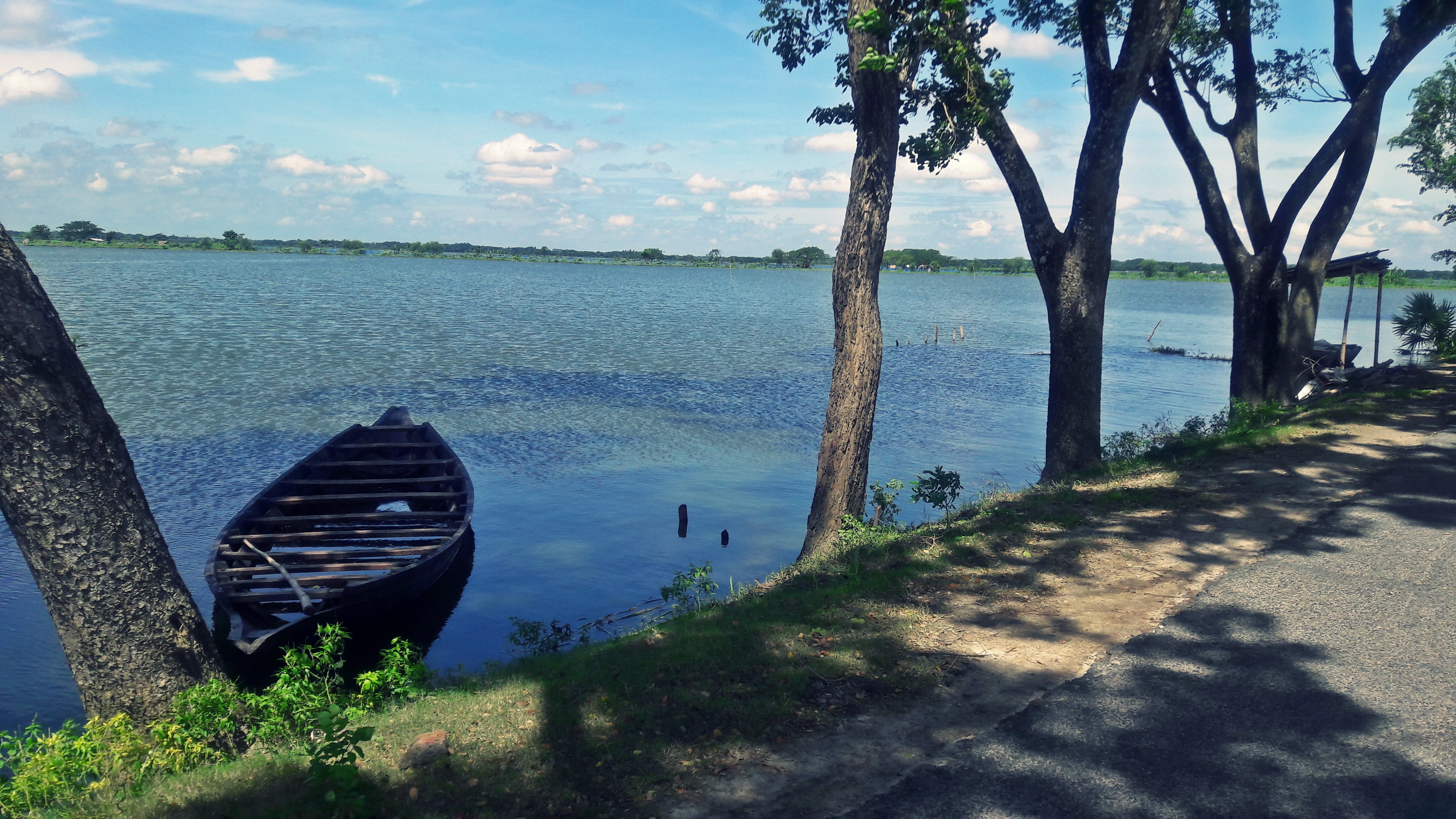
- Clockwise for top: Madhupolli, River in Keshabpur

- Location within Khulna division Location within Bangladesh
- Coordinates: 22°54′25″N 89°13′10″E
- Country: Bangladesh
- Division: Khulna
- District: Jessore
- Upazila: Keshabpur
- Established: 1857 (169 years ago)
- Municipality: 15 December 1998 (27 years ago)

Government
  - Type: Mayor-Council
  - Body: Keshabpur Municipality
  - Mayor: Vacant

Area
  - Total: 11.87 km^{2} (4.58 sq mi)
- Elevation: 6 m (20 ft)

Population (2022)
  - Total: 47,459
  - Density: 3,998/km^{2} (10,360/sq mi)
- Demonym: Keshabpuri
- Time zone: UTC+6 (BST)
- Postal Code: 7450
- Languages: Standard Bengali (Official)
- Police: Bangladesh Police
- Literacy rate: 90%
- Website: www.keshabpurpouroshava.gov.bd

Keshabpur is an upazila town in Jashore District. It is the headquarters of Keshabpur Upazila. It lies on the bank of Harihar and Burivodra River. The town is under justification of Keshabpur thana. It located 32 km south of Jessore, and about 42 km south west of Khulna. It is one of major town in Jashore district.

== Education ==
The Town literacy rate is 90%. The main educational institutions is

- Govt. Keshabpur College under justification of National University, Bangladesh

And For Secondary Education institute :

- Keshabpur Govt. Pilot Higher Secondary School
- Keshabpur Pilot Girls School

== Transport ==
The regional highway R755 cross the town. The city is about 32 km away from Jessore. The regional bus transport service is the main transport here.

The nearest railway Station are Jessore Junction railway station, Rupdia railway station & Noapara railway station both 34 km away from city centre.

The nearest Airport is Jashore Airport which is 36 km away. Another under-construction International Airport, Khan Jahan Ali Airport in Khulna is about 57 km away. And the closest international airport is Netaji Subhash Bose International Airport in Kolkata which is 74 km away. And The Shahjalal International Airport in Dhaka is 171 km from the city centre.
