= Sagardari Union =

Union in Khulna, Bangladesh

Sagardari Union সাগরদাড়ী ইউনিয়ন
- Union
- Location within Bangladesh
- Coordinates: 22.8352°N 89.1517°E
- Country: Bangladesh
- Division: Khulna
- District: Jessore
- Upazila: Keshabpur
- Established: 1870
- Founder: British Raj of British India
- Chairman-Member: union parishad

Government
  - Type: local government
  - Body: Chairman-ward Member
  - Chairman of union: vacant

Area
  - Total: 29.10 km^{2} (11.24 sq mi)
- Elevation: 5 m (16 ft)

Population (2022)
  - Total: 32,639
  - Density: 1,122/km^{2} (2,905/sq mi)
- Demonym: Bangladeshi
- Time zone: UTC+6 (BST)
- Postal code: 7450
- Website: sagardariup.jessore.gov.bd

Sagardari Union (Bengali: সাগরদাড়ী ইউনিয়ন), is a union parishad of the Jessore District in the Division of Khulna, Bangladesh.

== Geography ==
Sagardari Union has an area of 24.51 square kilometres. This is the southern most union of Jessore District. It is located 50 km south from Jessore town and 13 km south from Keshabpur town by road. It is bounded by Kapotaksha River and Satkhira District to the west and south, Trimohini, Bidyanandakati and Hasanpur union to the north and east.

== Demographics ==
According to the 2011 Bangladesh census, Keshabpur had a population of 24289. and It has is highest literacy rate within Keshabpur Upzilla.

== Notable people ==
- Michael Madhusudan Dutt, writer, was born there in 1824.

== Administration ==
Sagardari Union was established during British Raj on 1870.

Sagardari Union Parishad Complex is located on the banks of Kopotaksha river in Chingra Bazar area of Sagardari Union. The union consists of 9 wards and 16 villages. The union consists of a chairman, 9 ward members and 3 reserved women members. Each of them was directly elected by the people for 5 years.

The wards of the union are:

- Ward No. 1: Banshbaria and Raghurampur
- Ward No. 2: Meherpur and Gopsena
- Ward No. 3: Mirzapur and Bishnapur
- Ward No. 4: Gobindapur and Dharmapur
- Ward No. 5: Kasta and Baruihati
- Ward No. 6: Jhikra and Fatehpur
- Ward No. 6: Chinra
- Ward No. 6: Sagardari and Sheikhpara
- Ward No. 9: Sagardari and Komarpur

== Education ==
Local schools include Sagardari Michael Madhusadan Institution, a high school.
