= Ramnagar Union =

Ramnagar Union may also refer to:

- Ramnagar Union, Jessore Sadar, a union in Jessore Sadar Upazila
- Ramnagar Union, Nilphamari Sadar, a union in Nilphamari Sadar Upazila
