= Ahmed Ali Sardar =

Ahmed Ali Sardar was a member of the 4th National Assembly of Pakistan as a representative of East Pakistan.

Sardar was born in 1910 in Arabpur, Jessore District, East Bengal, British Raj. He started his business career working as a contractor for the British Army.

He was a member of the 4th National Assembly of Pakistan from Jessore. He retired from politics after the 1969 Mass uprising in East Pakistan and settled in Dhaka.

Sardar died on 16 January 1980 at Holy Family Red Crescent Medical College Hospital in Dhaka.
