= Magura Union =

Magura Union may refer to:

- Magura Union, Kishoreganj, a union in Kishoreganj Upazila
- Magura Union, Tala, a union in Tala Upazila
- Magura Union, Jhikargacha, a union in Jhikargacha Upazila
