= Kachua Union =

Kachua Union may refer to:

- Kachua Union, Kachua, a union in Kachua Upazila
- Kachua Union, Jessore Sadar, a union in Jessore Sadar Upazila
