= Sagardari Michael Madhusadan Institution =

Sagardari Michael Madhusudan Institution
- সাগরদাঁড়ি মাইকেল মধুসূদন ইনস্টিটিউশন

Location
- Dakbangla Road; Sagardari, Keshabpur, Jashore; 7450; Bangladesh; 22.8189°N 89.1618°E

Information
- Other name: SMMI
- Type: High school
- Motto: Read in the name of your God
- Established: 1944; 82 years ago
- School code: 115820
- Headmaster: Shamol Kumar Chowdhury
- Grades: 6 to 10
- Language: Bengali & English
- Hours in school day: 9am -2.30pm
- Campus: 10 acres
- Campus type: Rural
- Nickname: SMMI
- Affiliation: Board of Intermediate and Secondary Education, Jashore
- Website: sagardarimichaelmadhusudaninstitution.jessoreboard.gov.bd

Sagardari Michael Madhusudan Institution is a high school located in Sagardari of Keshabpur Upazila of Jashore District, Bangladesh. It is named after the poet Michael Madhusudan Dutt.

== History ==
In 1944 the institution was established by the locals in the fallow land in front of poet Michael Madhusudan Dutt's house.

In February 2023, local Awami League functionary Oliar Rahman was elected president of the school's governing committee. His father, Amanat Ali, had previously been president. In March of that year, Rahman suspended the headmaster, Shamol Kumar Chowdhury. Chowdhury alleged that Rahman suspended him because Rahman and Ali had appointed teachers illegally, and Chowdhury refused to sign off on the Monthly Pay Order (MPO) for those teachers. Chowdhury's suspension was overturned by the High Court in October 2023, but he was locked out by the acting headmaster. Students, allegedly at the instigation of the acting head, formed a human chain calling for Chowdhury's dismissal. As of September 2024, the internal conflict was ongoing.

== Academic ==
Today this institution offers grade 6 (class six) to grade 10 (class ten) as well as Secondary School Certificate.
