= Keshabpur Upazila =

Keshabpur কেশবপুর
- Upazila
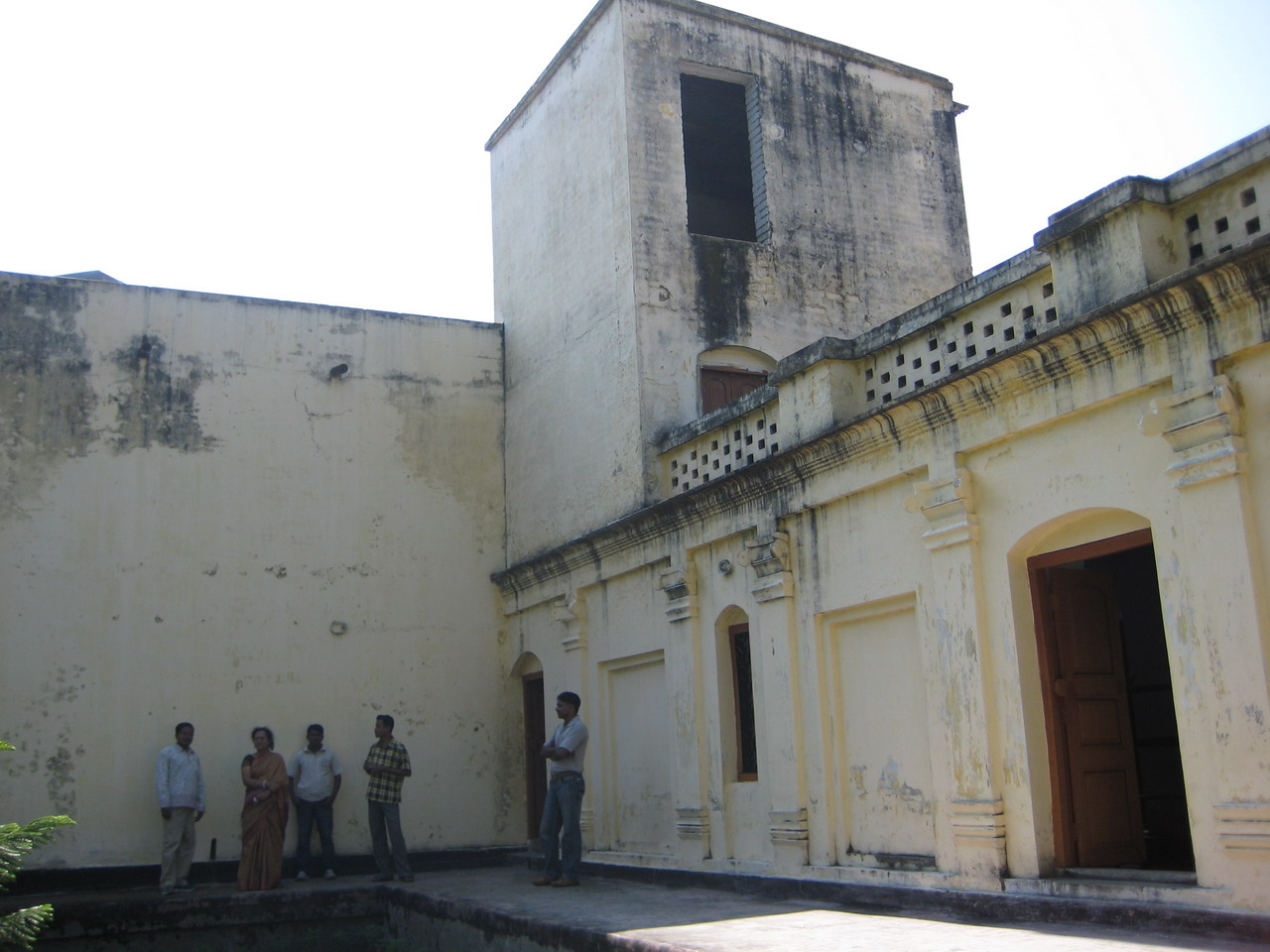
- A Partial View of Michael Madhusudan Dutt's House

- Coordinates: 22°54.3′N 89°34′E
- Country: Bangladesh
- Division: Khulna
- District: Jessore

Government
  - Upzilla executive officer: Reksona Khatun
  - Member of Parliament: None

Area
  - Total: 259.3 km^{2} (100.1 sq mi)
- Elevation: 6 m (20 ft)

Population (2022)
  - Total: 280,932
  - Density: 1,083/km^{2} (2,806/sq mi)
- Time zone: UTC+6 (BST)
- Postal code: 7450
- Area code: 04226
- Website: Official Map of Keshabpur

Keshabpur Upazila mauza geocode map

Keshabpur (Bengali: কেশবপুর) is an upazila of Jessore District in the division of Khulna, Bangladesh.

== Geography ==
Keshabpur is located at 22.9042°N 89.5667°E. It has 62,309 individual households and a total area of 258.44 km^{2}. The distance from Jashore City is 32 km.

Keshabpur Upazila of Jashore District has an area of 258.53 km^{2} and is bounded by Manirampur Upazila to the north, Kapotaksha River, Tala and Dumuria Upazila to the south, Dumuria Upazila to the east, and Kalaroa Upazila and Kapotaksha River to the west. The main rivers are Harihar, Kapotaksha River and Buribhdra.

== Demographics ==
Religions in Keshabpur Upazila (2022)
Religion	Percent
Islam	83.59%
Hinduism	16.29%
Other or not stated	0.12%

According to the 2022 Bangladeshi census, Keshabpur Upazila had 74,353 households and a population of 280,932. 8.09% of the population were under 5 years of age. Keshabpur had a literacy rate (age 7 and over) of 74.05%: 77.85% for males and 70.27% for females, and a sex ratio of 99.82 males for every 100 females. 41,779 (14.87%) lived in urban areas.

As of the 2011 Census of Bangladesh, Keshabpur upazila had 62,309 households and a population of 253,291. 49,862 (19.69%) were under 10 years of age. Keshabpur had an average literacy rate of 55.23%, compared to the national average of 51.8%, and a sex ratio of 1000 females per 1000 males. 33,780 (13.34%) of the population lived in urban areas. Ethnic population is 1,963 (0.77%).

According to the 1991 Bangladesh census, Keshabpur had a population of 200,229. Males constituted 51.16% of the population, and females 48.84%. This Upazila's population aged 18 or over was 103,794. Keshabpur had an average literacy rate of 55.5% (in those aged seven and above), while the national average was 68.4%.

== Points of interest ==
Sagardari is a village in the Keshabpur Upazila, built on the bank of the Kopotakho River, where the poet Michael Madhusudan Dutt was born on 25 January 1824. Tourists visit "Modhu Palli" and "Modhu Mela", a fair in memory of Modhusudan's Birthday, which is held every year.

Archaeological heritage and relics include remnants of the Bharatvhainabazar Rajbari (দেউলটি গুপ্ত যুগের খ্রিষ্টীয় ২য় শতকে নির্মিত হয়েছে বলে অনুমান করা হয় ), the residence of Nawab Mir Jumla (17th century), the residence of poet Madhusudan Dutt at Sagardari, and remnants of an ancient fort at village Bidhyanandikathi.

There is a memorial to the War of Liberation.

- Keshabpur Press Club established in 1978

The Home of Dhiraj Bhattacharya. He was born in a Zamindar family in Panjia village, near Jessore, in British India. His father's name was Lalit Mohan Bhattacharya. He entered Mitra Institution, Kolkata and passed matriculation in 1923. He joined the Ashutosh College to study literature but could not finish his studies. He joined the police service before becoming an actor.

== Administration ==
Keshabpur Police Station was turned into an upazila in 1983.

Keshabpur Upazila is divided into Keshabpur town which administered by Keshabpur municipality and eleven union parishads:

1. Trimohoni
2. Sagardari
3. Majidpur
4. Bidyanandakati
5. Mongolkot
6. Keshabpur
7. Pajia
8. Sufalakati
9. Gaurighona
10. Satbaria and
11. Hasanpur

The union parishads are subdivided into 142 mauzas and 135 villages.

Keshabpur Municipality is subdivided into 9 wards and 14 mahallas.

The area of the town is 18.46 km^{2}. The town has a population of 26,229, male 13,141, female 13,088. Population density is 1121 per km^{2}. The literacy rate within the town is 32.9%.

== Education ==
Educational institutions: college 5, high school 32, madrasa 97, government primary school 70, non-government primary school 85. Noted educational institutions:

- Keshabpur Govt. Degree College
- Keshabpur Govt. Pilot School & College
- Haji Abdul Motaleb Women's College, Keshabpur
- Keshabpur Girl's Pilot School
- Keshabpur Bahrul Ulum Kamil Madrasah
- Sagardari Michael Madhusadan Institution
- Sagardari A. S. K. Abu Sharab Sadik vocational and Commerce College
- A. S K Abu Sharab Sadik Govt Technical School, Sagardari
- Sagardari Alim Madrasa
- Mehepur Dakil Madrasah
- Meherpur govt primary school
- Gobindapur Govt primary school
- M. M. Gobindapur High School
- Bhallukgar Fazil Madrasa
- Panjia High School
- Panjia Degree College
- Biddyanandkati Rasbihari Institution
- Narayanpur High School
- Batikhula Dakil Madrasha
- Batikhula Primary School
- Mongolkote High School
- Shikarpur Secondary High School.
