= Central Locomotive Factory =

Locomotive factory in Bangladesh

- Trade name: KELOKA
- Native name: কেন্দ্রীয় লোকোমোটিভ কারখানা
- Romanized name: Kendriyo Locomotive Karkhana
- Company type: Government-owned
- Industry: Railway locomotive maintenance and repair
- Founded: May 14, 1992; 34 years ago in Parbatipur Upazila, Bangladesh
- Headquarters: Near Parbatipur Railway Station, beside Parbatipur-Syedpur regional highway, Parbatipur, Dinajpur District, Bangladesh
- Number of locations: 1
- Area served: Bangladesh
- Key people: Shah Sufi Nur Mohammad (Chief Executive Officer)
- Products: Maintenance and repair of meter-gauge and broad-gauge diesel locomotives
- Services: General Overhauling (GOH), special repairs
- Owner: Bangladesh Railway
- Number of employees: 236 (total allocated: 545, vacant: 309) (2019)
- Parent: Bangladesh Railway
- Divisions: Mechanical, Electrical, Safety, Health, Stores, and 6 others (total 11 departments)
- Footnotes / references The factory was established at a cost of 203 crore taka. In 2016, locomotive 2933 of the Parabat Express was damaged in an accident and was repaired in 2019 at a cost of 3 crore taka.

The Central Locomotive Factory (abbreviated as KELOKA) is the principal and largest locomotive factory in Bangladesh, located near the Parbatipur Railway Station in Parbatipur Upazila of Dinajpur District, beside Parbatipur-Syedpur regional highway. This factory is responsible for the maintenance and heavy repair of Bangladesh’s meter-gauge and broad-gauge diesel locomotives.

== History ==
The factory was established on May 14, 1992, at a cost of 203 crore taka and has a total of 11 departments, including mechanical, electrical, safety, health, and store departments. Although the total workforce allocation of the factory is 545 people, as of 2019, only 236 people are employed, and 309 positions are vacant. Currently, the Chief Executive Officer (CX) of this factory is Shah Sufi Nur Mohammad. Every operational locomotive here undergoes a heavy repair, called General Overhauling (GOH), every 6 years, and special repairs are conducted on locomotives that are damaged in accidents or suffer mechanical defects.

A significant incident occurred on October 7, 2016, when the 2900 class locomotive 2933, which was part of the Parabat Express, derailed at the Noyapara Railway Station in Madhabpur, Habiganj. The locomotive's fuel tank caught fire, severely damaging a large portion of the locomotive, causing it to become completely inoperable. After nearly three years of being stored at the Pahartali Diesel Factory, it was sent to the Central Locomotive Factory on May 15, 2019. Following 8 months of repairs at a cost of 3 crore taka, the locomotive was restored and made operational again.
