= Fatepur Union =

Fatepur Union may refer to:

- Fatepur Union, Jessore Sadar, a union in Jessore Sadar Upazila
- Fatepur Union, Maheshpur, a union in Maheshpur Upazila
- Fatepur Union (Mirzapur), a union in Mirzapur Upazila
