= Raipur Union, Bagherpara =

Raipur Union রায়পুর ইউনিয়ন
- Union
- Location in Bangladesh
- Coordinates: 23.2547°N 89.2977°E
- Country: Bangladesh
- Division: Khulna Division
- District: Jessore District
- Upazila: Bagherpara Upazila

Government
  - Type: Union council
- Time zone: UTC+6 (BST)
- Website: roypurup.jessore.gov.bd

Raipur Union (Bengali: রায়পুর ইউনিয়ন) is a union parishad in Bagherpara Upazila of Jessore District, in Khulna Division, Bangladesh.
