= Ganganandapur Union =

Union in Jessore, Khulna, Bangladesh

Ganganandapur Union গঙ্গানন্দপুর ইউনিয়ন
- Union
- Ganganandapur Union
- Location within Bangladesh
- Coordinates: 23.1710°N 89.0278°E
- Country: Bangladesh
- Division: Khulna
- District: Jessore
- Upazila: Chaugachha

Area
  - Total: 117.87 km^{2} (45.51 sq mi)

Population (2011)
  - Total: 30,526
  - Density: 258.98/km^{2} (670.76/sq mi)
- Time zone: UTC+6 (BST)
- Website: ganganandapurup.jessore.gov.bd

Ganganandapur Union (Bengali: গঙ্গানন্দপুর ইউনিয়ন), is a union parishad of the Jessore District in the Division of Khulna, Bangladesh. It has an area of 45.51 square kilometres and a population of 30,526.
