= Johorpur Union =

Johorpur Union জহুরপুর ইউনিয়ন
- Union
- Location in Bangladesh
- Coordinates: 23.3194°N 89.2392°E
- Country: Bangladesh
- Division: Khulna Division
- District: Jessore District
- Upazila: Bagherpara Upazila

Government
  - Type: Union council
- Time zone: UTC+6 (BST)
- Website: jaharpurup.jessore.gov.bd

Johorpur Union (Bengali: জহুরপুর ইউনিয়ন) is a union parishad in Bagherpara Upazila of Jessore District, in Khulna Division, Bangladesh.
