= Kashimpur Union =

Kashimpur Union কাশিমপুর ইউনিয়ন
- Union
- Location in Bangladesh
- Coordinates: 23.2321°N 89.2007°E
- Country: Bangladesh
- Division: Khulna Division
- District: Jessore District
- Upazila: Jessore Sadar Upazila

Government
  - Type: Union council
- Time zone: UTC+6 (BST)
- Website: kashimpurup6.jessore.gov.bd

Kashimpur Union (Bengali: কাশিমপুর ইউনিয়ন) is a union parishad in Jessore Sadar Upazila of Jessore District, in Khulna Division, Bangladesh. Kashimpur Central Prison is located there.
