= Shimulia Union, Chaugachha =

Shimulia Union শিমুলিয়া ইউনিয়ন
- Union
- Shimulia Union
- Location within Bangladesh
- Coordinates: 23.1025°N 89.0330°E
- Country: Bangladesh
- Division: Khulna
- District: Jessore
- Upazila: Chaugachha

Area
  - Total: 67.24 km^{2} (25.96 sq mi)

Population (2011)
  - Total: 46,893
  - Density: 697.4/km^{2} (1,806/sq mi)
- Time zone: UTC+6 (BST)
- Website: shimuliaup.jessore.gov.bd

Shimulia Union (Bengali: শিমুলিয়া ইউনিয়ন), is a union parishad of the Jessore District in the Division of Khulna, Bangladesh. It has an area of 25.96 square kilometres and a population of 46,893.

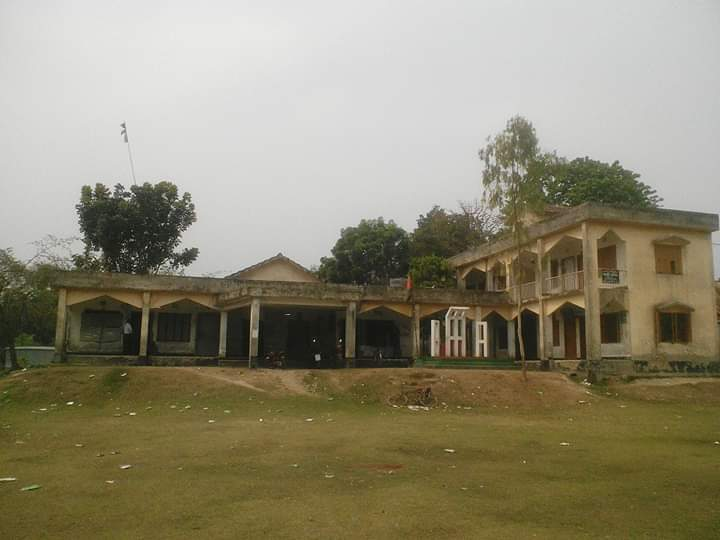
Building in Shimulia Union

Shimulia College is the only college in the union. There are three secondary schools: Mokamtala Secondary School, Saint Louis High School, and Shimulia S.M.P.K. High School.
