= Patibila Union =

Union in Khulna, Bangladesh

Patibila Union পাতিবিলা ইউনিয়ন
- Union
- Patibila Union
- Location within Bangladesh
- Coordinates: 23.2958°N 89.0304°E
- Country: Bangladesh
- Division: Khulna
- District: Jessore
- Upazila: Chaugachha

Area
  - Total: 44.91 km^{2} (17.34 sq mi)
  - Land: 515,424 km^{2} (199,006 sq mi)

Population (2011)
  - Total: 23,268
  - Density: 0.045143/km^{2} (0.11692/sq mi)
- Time zone: UTC+6 (BST)
- Website: patibilaup7.jessore.gov.bd

Patibila Union (Bengali: পাতিবিলা ইউনিয়ন) is a union parishad under Chaugachha Upazila of Jessore District in the division of Khulna, Bangladesh. It has an area of 17.34 square kilometres and a population of 23,268.
