= Bukbhara Baor =

Lake in Bangladesh

- বুকভরা বাঁওড় (Bengali)
- Location within Bangladesh
- Location: Jessore Sadar Upazila, near Jessore Cantonment
- Coordinates: 23°10′34.4″N 89°07′03.0″E 23°10'34.4"N 89°07'03.0"E
- Type: Oxbow lake
- Basin countries: Bangladesh
- Surface area: 352.13 acres (1.4250 km^{2})
- Max. depth: 20 ft (6.1 m)
- Shore length^{1}: 2 mi (3.2 km) approx.
- ^{1} Shore length is not a well-defined measure.

Bukbhara Baor (Bengali: বুকভরা বাঁওড়) is an oxbow lake in Bangladesh. Located in Jessore Sadar Upazila, it is surrounded by five villages named Halsa, Arichpur, Chandutia, Mathbari and Ichhapur. This one of the prominent lakes in Jessore region. The lake is linked to the Kopothakho River by a canal spreading around 7 kilometres (4.3 mi), known as Katakhal.

== Recreation ==
Bukbhara Baor is one of the main natural attractions of Jessore Sadar Upazila due to its scenic surroundings and biodiversity. A large number of visitors come here every year. It is one of the largest sources of freshwater fishes. Fishing including recreational fishing is done by visitors. Other recreational activities include boating, canoeing, swimming in summer and migratory bird watching in winter.

== Fish production ==
The lake is home to many different varieties of (Ruhi, Catla, Grass Carp, Labeo boga, and Tilapia) including sport fish (Sperata aor and many more). About 38 species of freshwater fish are found in the water of this lake. A total number of 352 fishermen earn their livelihoods by doing fishing in this lake. They work as a group fishermen. In every group, 10 to 11 fishermen work together.

All of the Baors of Bangladesh are regulated under the management either managed by the GOB or the private leaseholders, which are known as community base fisheries management (CBFM). There are two groups of authority in this lake management, the Lake Fisheries Team (LFT) and the Fish Farmers Group (FFG), which work at the primary operational level. A Lake Management Group (LMG) works at the collective level. LTF/FFG is involved with the operation of Lake Fishery or pond culture within Lake Boundary while LMG is the control body, this looks after the interest of all member fishers in the lake in general. There is also a low facility landing center at the Chandutia Bazar which has been built by the Ministry of Fisheries. After meeting the local demand, fishes are supplied all across the country including Dhaka. In the year 2003, the government earned 1,50,0000 takas as revenue just from fisheries of the baor which was paid as lease money.

== Military training ==
Since it is located near the Cantonment, Winter Collective Training of the 55 Infantry Division of Bangladesh Army is exercised on the surrounding ground of the lake. The Prime Minister of Bangladesh has appeared and commissioned junior officers on such event.
