= Sharsha Upazila =

Sharsha শার্শা
- Upazila
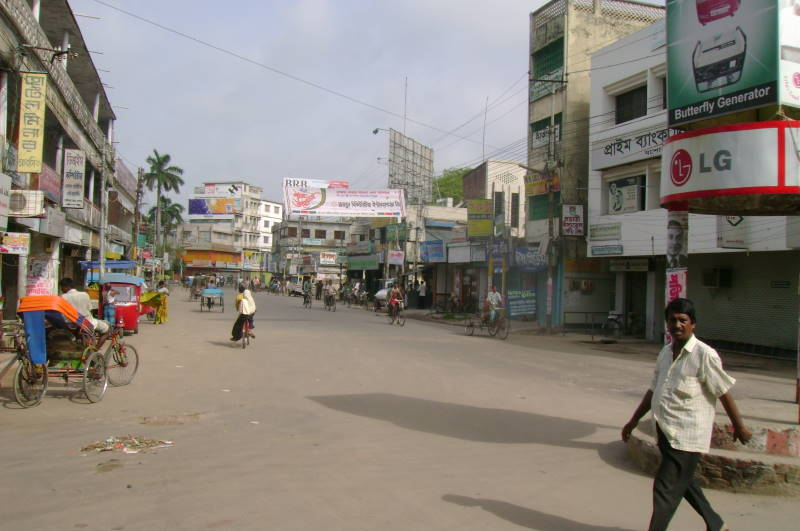
- Streets in Benapole

- Coordinates: 23°4.5′N 88°52′E
- Country: Bangladesh
- Division: Khulna
- District: Jessore

Area
  - Total: 336.28 km^{2} (129.84 sq mi)

Population (2022)
  - Total: 387,631
  - Density: 1,152.7/km^{2} (2,985.5/sq mi)
- Time zone: UTC+6 (BST)
- Postal code: 7430
- Area code: 0421
- Website: Official Map of Sharsha

Sharsha (Bengali: শার্শা) is an upazila of Jessore District in the Division of Khulna, Bangladesh. The Upazila is situated on the border and contains the town of Benapole, which is the largest land port along the India-Bangladesh border.

Sharsha Upazila mauza geocode map

== Geography ==
Sharsha is located at 23.0744°N 88.8667°E. It has 82,835 households and an area of 336.28 km^{2}.

Sharsha Upazila is bounded by Bagdah CD Block in North 24 Parganas district in West Bengal, India and Chaugachha Upazila on the north, Jhikargachha upazila on the east, Kalaroa upazila of Satkhira district on the south and Bangaon and Gaighata CD Blocks in North 24 Parganas district in West Bengal, India, on the west.

== Demographics ==
Religions in Sharsha Upazila (2022)
Religion	Percent
Islam	97.63%
Hinduism	2.27%
Other or not stated	0.10%

According to the 2022 Bangladeshi census, Sharsha Upazila had 102,376 households and a population of 387,631. 9.11% of the population were under 5 years of age. Sharsha had a literacy rate (age 7 and over) of 76.71%: 78.78% for males and 74.72% for females, and a sex ratio of 97.25 males for every 100 females. 101,234 (26.12%) lived in urban areas.

As of the 2011 Census of Bangladesh, Sharsha upazila had 82,835 households and a population of 341,565. 67,310 (19.71%) were under 10 years of age. Sharsha had an average literacy rate of 49.76%, compared to the national average of 51.8%, and a sex ratio of 1007 females per 1000 males. 41,608 (12.19%) of the population lived in urban areas.

According to the 1991 Bangladesh census, Sharsha had a population of 258,789. Males comprised 51.4% of the population, and females 48.6%. The population aged 18 or over was 126,532. Sharsha had an average literacy rate of 25.5% (7+ years), compared to the national average of 32.4%.

== Administration ==
Sharsha Upazila is divided into one Municipality and 11 union parishads.

Municipality:

- Benapole Municipality

Union Parishads:

- Sharsha
- Bagachra
- Bahadurpur
- Benapole
- Dihi
- Goga
- Kayba
- Lakshmanpur
- Nizampur
- Putkhali
- Ulashi

The union parishads are subdivided into 135 mauzas and 168 villages.

Benapole Municipality is subdivided into 9 wards and 12 mahallas.

== See also ==
- Upazilas of Bangladesh
- Districts of Bangladesh
- Divisions of Bangladesh
