= Dhuliani Union =

Dhuliani Union ধুলিয়ানী ইউনিয়ন
- Union
- Dhuliani Union
- Location within Bangladesh
- Coordinates: 23.2078°N 89.0233°E
- Country: Bangladesh
- Division: Khulna
- District: Jessore
- Upazila: Chaugachha

Area
  - Total: 37.68 km^{2} (14.55 sq mi)

Population (2011)
  - Total: 13,788
  - Density: 365.9/km^{2} (947.7/sq mi)
- Time zone: UTC+6 (BST)
- Website: dhulianiup4.jessore.gov.bd

Dhuliani Union (Bengali: ধুলিয়ানী ইউনিয়ন) is a union parishad under Chaugachha Upazila of Jessore District in the division of Khulna, Bangladesh. It has an area of 14.55 square kilometres and a population of 13788.
