= Keshabpur Govt. Degree College =

Educational institution in Jashore district of Bangladesh

- Motto: Read on the name of God
- Type: Public
- Established: 1968; 58 years ago
- Founder: Prof. Nowab Ali Khan
- Affiliations: Bangladesh National University, Board of Intermediate and Secondary Education, Jashore
- Principal: Prof. Md. Asaduzzaman
- Students: 5000
- Undergraduates: 2000
- Location: Jashore-Satkhira Road, Keshabpur, Khulna, 7450, Bangladesh; 22°54′10″N 89°13′09″E
- Campus: Urban
- Colors: Blue and white
- Nickname: Keshabpur Gegree College
- Website: www.kgdc.edu.bd

Keshabpur Govt. Degree College is an educational institution located at Keshabpur of Keshabpur Upazila in the Jashore district of Bangladesh which was established on 1968. The college is currently imparting education at higher secondary, and undergraduate levels under the Board of Intermediate and Secondary Education, Jashore, and National University. At the time of establishment it was known as Keshabpur College, which is now known as Keshabpur Govt. Degree College from 2018. At present, the college offers courses in various subjects in higher secondary, graduate, and honors categories. At present the institution has about 5 thousand students.

== History ==
The college was established in 1968 as a private college. In 2018 the college was nationalized by the ministry of education. For this, The college changed its name to Keshabpur Govt. Degree College.
