= Upashahar Union =

Upashahar Union উপশহর ইউনিয়ন
- Union
- Country: Bangladesh
- Division: Khulna Division
- District: Jessore District
- Upazila: Jessore Sadar Upazila

Government
  - Type: Union council
- Time zone: UTC+6 (BST)
- Website: upasaharup.jessore.gov.bd

Upashahar Union (Bengali: উপশহর ইউনিয়ন) is a union parishad in Jessore Sadar Upazila of Jessore District, in Khulna Division, Bangladesh.
