= Pashapole Union =

Pashapole Union পাশাপোল ইউনিয়ন
- Union
- Pashapole Union
- Country: Bangladesh
- Division: Khulna
- District: Jessore
- Upazila: Chaugachha

Area
  - Total: 25.96 km^{2} (10.02 sq mi)

Population (2011)
  - Total: 18,171
  - Density: 700.0/km^{2} (1,813/sq mi)
- Time zone: UTC+6 (BST)
- Postal code: 7470
- Website: pashapoleup2.jessore.gov.bd

Pashapole Union (Bengali: পাশাপোল ইউনিয়ন) is a union parishad under Chaugachha Upazila of Jessore District in the division of Khulna, Bangladesh. It has an area of 10 square kilometres and a population of 18171.
