= Hajirbag Union =

Hajirbag Union হাজিরবাগ ইউনিয়ন
- Union
- Hajirbag Union
- Location within Bangladesh
- Coordinates: 23.0055°N 89.0351°E
- Country: Bangladesh
- Division: Khulna
- District: Jessore
- Upazila: Chaugachha

Population (2011)
  - Total: 21,247
- Time zone: UTC+6 (BST)
- Website: hajirbaghup.jessore.gov.bd

Hajirbag Union (Bengali: হাজিরবাগ ইউনিয়ন), is a union parishad of the Jessore District in the Division of Khulna, Bangladesh. It has an area of 12 square kilometres and a population of 21,247.
