= Sukhpukuria Union =

Sukhpukuria Union সুখপুকুরিয়া ইউনিয়ন
- Union
- Sukhpukuria Union
- Location within Bangladesh
- Coordinates: 23.2578°N 88.9257°E
- Country: Bangladesh
- Division: Khulna
- District: Jessore
- Upazila: Chaugachha

Area
  - Total: 91.48 km^{2} (35.32 sq mi)

Population (2011)
  - Total: 27,232
  - Density: 297.7/km^{2} (771.0/sq mi)
- Time zone: UTC+6 (BST)
- Website: sukpukhuriaup11.jessore.gov.bd

Sukhpukuria Union (Bengali: সুখপুকুরিয়া ইউনিয়ন) is a union parishad under Chaugachha Upazila of Jessore District in the division of Khulna, Bangladesh. It has an area of 35.32 square kilometres and a population of 27232.
