= Narendrapur Union =

Narendrapur Union নরেন্দ্রপুর ইউনিয়ন
- Union
- Location in Bangladesh
- Coordinates: 23.1274°N 89.2893°E
- Country: Bangladesh
- Division: Khulna Division
- District: Jessore District
- Upazila: Jessore Sadar Upazila

Government
  - Type: Union council
- Time zone: UTC+6 (BST)
- Website: narendrapurup.jessore.gov.bd

Narendrapur Union (Bengali: নরেন্দ্রপুর ইউনিয়ন) is a union parishad in Jessore Sadar Upazila of Jessore District, in Khulna Division, Bangladesh.
