= Swarupdaha Union =

Swarupdaha Union স্বরুপদাহ ইউনিয়ন
- Union
- Swarupdaha Union
- Location within Bangladesh
- Coordinates: 23.2539°N 89.0014°E
- Country: Bangladesh
- Division: Khulna
- District: Jessore
- Upazila: Chaugachha

Area
  - Land: 89.02 km^{2} (34.37 sq mi)

Population (2011)
  - Total: 26,155
  - Density: 293.8/km^{2} (761.0/sq mi)
- Time zone: UTC+6 (BST)
- Postal code: 7470
- Website: swarupdahaup9.jessore.gov.bd

Swarupdaha Union (Bengali: স্বরুপদাহ ইউনিয়ন) is a union parishad under Chaugachha Upazila of Jessore District in the division of Khulna, Bangladesh. It has an area of 34.37 square kilometres and a population of 26155.
