= Fulsara Union =

Fulsara Union ফুলসারা ইউনিয়ন
- Union
- Fulsara Union
- Location within Bangladesh
- Coordinates: 23.2394°N 89.0985°E
- Country: Bangladesh
- Division: Khulna
- District: Jessore
- Upazila: Chaugachha

Population (2011)
  - Total: 23,268
- Time zone: UTC+6 (BST)
- Website: fulsaraup1.jessore.gov.bd

Fulsara Union (Bengali: ফুলসারা ইউনিয়ন) is a union parishad under Chaugachha Upazila of Jessore District in the division of Khulna, Bangladesh. It has an area of 20 square kilometres and a population of 23268.
