= Singhajhuli Union =

Singhajhuli Union সিংহঝুলী ইউনিয়ন
- Union
- Singhajhuli Union
- Location within Bangladesh
- Coordinates: 23.2458°N 89.0628°E
- Country: Bangladesh
- Division: Khulna
- District: Jessore
- Upazila: Chaugachha

Population (2011)
  - Total: 11,069
- Time zone: UTC+6 (BST)
- Website: singhajhuliup3.jessore.gov.bd

Singhajhuli Union (Bengali: সিংহঝুলি ইউনিয়ন) is a union parishad under Chaugachha Upazila of Jessore District in the division of Khulna, Bangladesh. It has an area of 5452 acres and a population of 13,528.

The education rate of this union is 53%. One of the two educational institutions are Shahid Mashiur Rahman High School, and Shinghajhully Alim Madrasha. The current chairman of the union is Ab Hamid Mollik (2023).
