= Chaugachha Union =

Chaugachha Union চৌগাছা ইউনিয়ন
- Union
- Chaugachha Union
- Location within Bangladesh
- Coordinates: 23.2558°N 89.0409°E
- Country: Bangladesh
- Division: Khulna
- District: Jessore
- Upazila: Chaugachha

Area
  - Total: 17.48 km^{2} (6.75 sq mi)

Population (2011)
  - Total: 12,099
  - Density: 692.2/km^{2} (1,793/sq mi)
- Time zone: UTC+6 (BST)
- Website: chougachhaup5.jessore.gov.bd

Chaugachha Union (Bengali: ফুলসারা ইউনিয়ন) is a union parishad under Chaugachha Upazila of Jessore District in the division of Khulna, Bangladesh. It has an area of 6.75 square kilometres and a population of 12,099.
