= Noapara railway station =

Railway station Bangladesh

Noapara নওয়াপাড়া
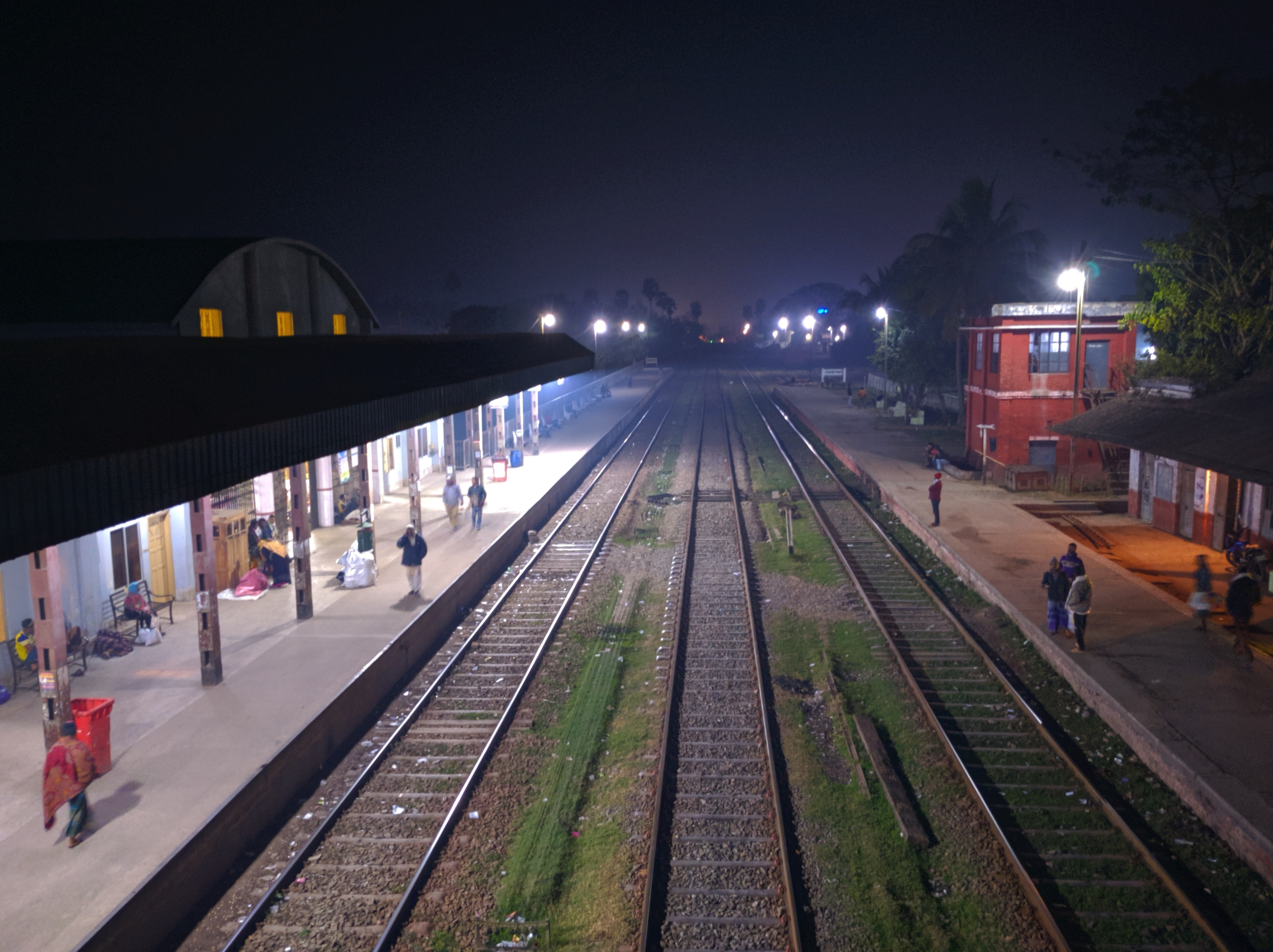
- Noapara Railway Station

General information
- Location: Noapara, Abhaynagar Upazila, Jashore District; Bangladesh
- Coordinates: 23.0332329°N 89.3952433°E
- Owner: Bangladesh Railway
- Line: Darshana–Jessore–Khulna line
- Platforms: 2
- Tracks: 3

Construction
- Structure type: Standard (on ground station)
- Parking: Yes
- Cycle facilities: Yes
- Accessible: Yes

Other information
- Status: Opened
- Station code: NAP
- Zone(s): West Zone
- Division(s): Pakshi

History
- Opened: 1884; 142 years ago

Services
Preceding station	Bangladesh Railway	Following station
Chengutia towards Darshana Junction	Darshana–Jessore–Khulna	Taltala hat towards Khulna
Location

Noapara railway station (Bengali: নওয়াপাড়া রেলওয়ে স্টেশন) is a railway station on Darshana-Jessore-Khulna line. This is the primary railway station at Abhaynagar upazila in Jashore District. This station located in Noapara.
