= Bankra Union =

Bankra Union বাঁকড়া ইউনিয়ন
- Union
- Bankra Union
- Location within Bangladesh
- Coordinates: 22.9752°N 89.0722°E
- Country: Bangladesh
- Division: Khulna
- District: Jessore
- Upazila: Chaugachha
- Time zone: UTC+6 (BST)
- Website: bankraup.jessore.gov.bd

Bankra Union (Bengali: বাঁকড়া ইউনিয়ন) is a union parishad of the Jessore District in the Division of Khulna, Bangladesh.
