= Jagadishpur Union =

Jagadishpur Union জগদীশপুর ইউনিয়ন
- Union
- Jagadishpur Union
- Location within Bangladesh
- Coordinates: 23.2957°N 89.0703°E
- Country: Bangladesh
- Division: Khulna
- District: Jessore
- Upazila: Chaugachha

Area
  - Total: 51.93 km^{2} (20.05 sq mi)

Population (2011)
  - Total: 16,087
  - Density: 309.8/km^{2} (802.3/sq mi)
- Time zone: UTC+6 (BST)
- Website: jagadishpurup6.jessore.gov.bd

Jagadishpur Union (Bengali: ফুলসারা ইউনিয়ন) is a union parishad under Chaugachha Upazila of Jessore District in the division of Khulna, Bangladesh. It has an area of 20.05 square kilometres and a population of 16,087.
