= Hakimpur Union =

Hakimpur Union হাকিমপুর ইউনিয়ন
- Union
- Hakimpur Union
- Location within Bangladesh
- Coordinates: 23.6874°N 89.2956°E
- Country: Bangladesh
- Division: Khulna
- District: Jessore
- Upazila: Chaugachha

Area
  - Total: 42.75 km^{2} (16.51 sq mi)

Population (2011)
  - Total: 17,829
  - Density: 417.1/km^{2} (1,080/sq mi)
- Time zone: UTC+6 (BST)
- Website: hakimpurup8.jessore.gov.bd

Hakimpur Union (Bengali: ফুলসারা ইউনিয়ন) is a union parishad under Chaugachha Upazila of Jessore District in the division of Khulna, Bangladesh. It has an area of 16.51 square kilometres and a population of 17829.
