= Shimulia Union =

Shimulia Union may refer to:

- Shimulia Union, Khoksa, a union in Khoksa Upazila
- Shimulia Union, Chaugachha, a union in Chaugachha Upazila
