= Gaurighona Union =

Union in Khulna, Bangladesh

Gaurighona Union গৌরিঘোনা ইউনিয়ন
- Union
- Gaurighona Union
- Location within Bangladesh
- Coordinates: 22.8400°N 89.3250°E
- Country: Bangladesh
- Division: Khulna
- District: Jessore
- Upazila: Keshabpur

Population (2011)
  - Total: 25,172
- Time zone: UTC+6 (BST)
- Website: gaurighonaup.jessore.gov.bd

Gaurighona Union (Bengali: গৌরিঘোনা ইউনিয়ন) is a union parishad under Keshabpur Upazila of Jessore District in the Division of Khulna, Bangladesh.
