= Siddhipasha Union =

Siddhipasha Union সিদ্ধিপাশা ইউনিয়ন
- Union
- Siddhipasha Union
- Country: Bangladesh
- Division: Khulna
- District: Jessore
- Upazila: Abhaynagar
- Time zone: UTC+6 (BST)
- Website: siddhipashaup.jessore.gov.bd

Siddhipasha Union (Bengali: সিদ্ধিপাশা ইউনিয়ন) is a union parishad of Abhaynagar Upazila, in Jessore District, Khulna Division of Bangladesh.
