= Baghutia Union =

Baghutia Union বাঘুটিয়া ইউনিয়ন
- Union
- Baghutia Union
- Location within Bangladesh
- Coordinates: 23.0102°N 89.4450°E
- Country: Bangladesh
- Division: Khulna
- District: Jessore
- Upazila: Abhaynagar
- Time zone: UTC+6 (BST)
- Website: baghutiaup.jessore.gov.bd

Baghutia Union (Bengali: বাঘুটিয়া ইউনিয়ন) is a union parishad of Abhaynagar Upazila, in Jessore District, Khulna Division of Bangladesh.

== Geographic location ==
According to the geographical location,Narail District is situated in the North of the Union, Nawapara Municipality in the South, Shubarara Union in the East and Sridharpur Union in the West. There are 18 villages and 12 mauzas in the Baghutia Union.
