= Narayanpur Union =

Narayanpur Union নারায়নপুর ইউনিয়ন
- Union
- Narayanpur Union
- Location within Bangladesh
- Coordinates: 24.0649°N 90.8857°E
- Country: Bangladesh
- Division: Khulna
- District: Jessore
- Upazila: Chaugachha

Area
  - Total: 74.41 km^{2} (28.73 sq mi)

Population (2011)
  - Total: 22,037
  - Density: 296.2/km^{2} (767.0/sq mi)
- Time zone: UTC+6 (BST)
- Website: narayanpurup10.jessore.gov.bd

Narayanpur Union (Bengali: ফুলসারা ইউনিয়ন) is a union parishad under Chaugachha Upazila of Jessore District in the division of Khulna, Bangladesh. It has an area of 28.73 square kilometres (11.09 sq mi). The population was 22,037 in 2011.
