= Sundoli Union =

Sundoli Union সুন্দলী ইউনিয়ন
- Union
- Sundoli Union
- Location within Bangladesh
- Coordinates: 23.0421°N 89.3325°E
- Country: Bangladesh
- Division: Khulna
- District: Jessore
- Upazila: Abhaynagar
- Time zone: UTC+6 (BST)
- Website: sundoliup.jessore.gov.bd

Sundoli Union (Bengali: সুন্দলী ইউনিয়ন) is a union parishad of Abhaynagar Upazila, in Jessore District, Khulna Division of Bangladesh.

== Demography ==
Religions in Sundoli Union (2022)
| Religion | Percent |
| Hinduism | 84.71% |
| Islam | 14.81% |
| Other or not stated | 0.49% |
