= Bahadurpur Union, Sharsha =

Union in Khulna, Bangladesh

Bahadurpur Union বাহাদুরপুর ইউনিয়ন
- Union
- Bahadurpur Union
- Country: Bangladesh
- Division: Khulna
- District: Jessore
- Upazila: Sharsha

Population (2011)
  - Total: 25,630
- Time zone: UTC+6 (BST)
- Website: bahadurpurup.jessore.gov.bd

Bahadurpur Union (Bengali: বাহাদুরপুর ইউনিয়ন) is a Union Parishad under Sharsha Upazila of Jessore District in the division of Khulna, Bangladesh.
