= Sreedharpur Union =

Sreedharpur Union শ্রীধরপুর ইউনিয়ন
- Union
- Sreedharpur Union
- Location within Bangladesh
- Coordinates: 23.0668°N 89.4119°E
- Country: Bangladesh
- Division: Khulna
- District: Jessore
- Upazila: Abhaynagar
- Time zone: UTC+6 (BST)
- Website: sreedharpurup.jessore.gov.bd

Sreedharpur Union (Bengali: শ্রীধরপুর ইউনিয়ন) is a union parishad of Abhaynagar Upazila, in Jessore District, Khulna Division of Bangladesh.
