= Ulshi Union =

Union in Khulna, Bangladesh

Ulshi Union উলাশী ইউনিয়ন
- Union
- Country: Bangladesh
- Division: Khulna
- District: Jessore
- Upazila: Sharsha
- Established: 1962

Area
  - Total: 90.42 km^{2} (34.91 sq mi)

Population (2011)
  - Total: 44,102
  - Density: 487.7/km^{2} (1,263/sq mi)
- Time zone: UTC+6 (BST)
- Website: ulshiup.jessore.gov.bd

Ulshi Union (Bengali: উলাশী ইউনিয়ন) is a union parishad under Sharsha Upazila of Jessore District in the division of Khulna, Bangladesh. It has an area of 34.91 square kilometres and a population of 44,102.
