= Satbaria Union, Keshabpur =

Union in Khulna, Bangladesh

Satbaria Union সাতবাড়িয়া ইউনিয়ন পরিষদ
- Union
- Satbaria Union Parishad
- Location within Bangladesh
- Coordinates: 22.9046°N 89.1568°E
- Country: Bangladesh
- Division: Khulna
- District: Jessore
- Upazila: Keshabpur
- Established: 2016
- Founder: CHAIRMAN MD SAMSUDDIN DAFADAR
- Seat: UNION PARISHAD

Government
  - Type: CHAIRMAN
  - Body: Union councils of Bangladesh
  - Chairman: SHAMSUDDIN DAFADAR (Bangladesh Awami League)

Area
  - Total: 9.80 km^{2} (3.78 sq mi)
  - Rank: 10

Population (2011)
  - Total: 28,203
  - Density: 2,880/km^{2} (7,450/sq mi)
- Time zone: UTC+6 (BST)
- Website: satbariaup.jessore.gov.bd

Satbaria Union (Bengali: সাতবাড়িয়া ইউনিয়ন), is a union parishad of the Jessore District in the Division of Khulna, Bangladesh. It has an area of 3.78 square kilometres and a population of 28203. 1st Chairman MD SAMSUDDIN DAFADAR.
