= Sufalakati Union =

Union in Khulna, Bangladesh

Sufalakati Union সুফলাকাটি ইউনিয়ন
- Union
- Sufalakati Union
- Location within Bangladesh
- Coordinates: 22.8961°N 89.3199°E
- Country: Bangladesh
- Division: Khulna
- District: Jessore
- Upazila: Keshabpur

Area
  - Total: 14.70 km^{2} (5.68 sq mi)

Population (2011)
  - Total: 19,190
  - Density: 1,305/km^{2} (3,381/sq mi)
- Time zone: UTC+6 (BST)
- Website: sufalakatiup.jessore.gov.bd

Sufalakati Union (Bengali: সুফলাকাটি ইউনিয়ন), is a union parishad of the Jessore District in the Division of Khulna, Bangladesh. It has an area of 14.70 square kilometres and a population of 19190.
