= Dhalgram Union =

Dhalgram Union ধলগ্রাম ইউনিয়ন
- Union
- Location in Bangladesh
- Coordinates: 23.2407°N 89.4103°E
- Country: Bangladesh
- Division: Khulna Division
- District: Jessore District
- Upazila: Bagherpara Upazila

Government
  - Type: Union council
- Time zone: UTC+6 (BST)
- Website: dhalgramup.jessore.gov.bd

Dhalgram Union (Bengali: ধলগ্রাম ইউনিয়ন) is a union parishad in Bagherpara Upazila of Jessore District, in Khulna Division, Bangladesh.
