= Arabpur Union =

Arabpur Union আরবপুর ইউনিয়ন
- Union
- Location in Bangladesh
- Coordinates: 23.1534°N 89.1716°E
- Country: Bangladesh
- Division: Khulna Division
- District: Jessore District
- Upazila: Jessore Sadar Upazila

Government
  - Type: Union council
- Time zone: UTC+6 (BST)
- Website: arabpurup9.jessore.gov.bd

Arabpur Union (Bengali: আরবপুর ইউনিয়ন) is a union parishad in Jessore Sadar Upazila of Jessore District, in Khulna Division, Bangladesh.
