= Chalishia Union =

Chalishia Union চলিশিয়া ইউনিয়ন
- Union
- Chalishia Union
- Location within Bangladesh
- Coordinates: 22.9984°N 89.3914°E
- Country: Bangladesh
- Division: Khulna
- District: Jessore
- Upazila: Abhaynagar
- Time zone: UTC+6 (BST)
- Website: chalishiaup.jessore.gov.bd

Chalishia Union (Bengali: চলিশিয়া ইউনিয়ন) is a union parishad of Abhaynagar Upazila, in Jessore District, Khulna Division of Bangladesh.
