= Dihi Union =

Union in Khulna, Bangladesh

Dihi Union ডিহি ইউনিয়ন
- Union
- Dihi Union
- Country: Bangladesh
- Division: Khulna
- District: Jessore
- Upazila: Sharsha

Area
  - Total: 89.51 km^{2} (34.56 sq mi)

Population (2011)
  - Total: 19,396
  - Density: 216.7/km^{2} (561.2/sq mi)
- Time zone: UTC+6 (BST)
- Website: dihiup.jessore.gov.bd

Dihi Union (Bengali: ডিহি ইউনিয়ন) is a Union Parishad under Sharsha Upazila of Jessore District in the division of Khulna, Bangladesh. It has an area of 34.56 square kilometres and a population of 19,396.
