= Sharsha Union =

Union in Khulna, Bangladesh

Sharsha Union শার্শা ইউনিয়ন
- Union
- Sharsha Union
- Country: Bangladesh
- Division: Khulna
- District: Jessore
- Upazila: Sharsha
- Time zone: UTC+6 (BST)
- Website: sharshaup.jessore.gov.bd

Sharsha Union (Bengali: শার্শা ইউনিয়ন) is a Union Parishad under Sharsha Upazila of Jessore District in the division of Khulna, Bangladesh.
