= Goga Union =

Union in Khulna, Bangladesh

Goga Union গোগা ইউনিয়ন
- Union
- Goga Union
- Country: Bangladesh
- Division: Khulna
- District: Jessore
- Upazila: Sharsha

Area
  - Total: 92.23 km^{2} (35.61 sq mi)

Population (2011)
  - Total: 38,062
  - Density: 412.7/km^{2} (1,069/sq mi)
- Time zone: UTC+6 (BST)
- Website: gogaup.jessore.gov.bd

Goga Union (Bengali: গোগা ইউনিয়ন) is a Union Parishad under Sharsha Upazila of Jessore District in the division of Khulna, Bangladesh. It has an area of 35.61 square kilometres and a population of 38,062. The union consists of the villages of: Panchbhulat, Agrabhulat, Horishchandrapur, Goga West, Goga East, Amlai, Kaliani, Ichapur, Gopalpur, and Setai.
