= Nizampur Union, Sharsha =

Union in Khulna, Bangladesh

Nizampur Union নিজামপুর ইউনিয়ন
- Union
- Nizampur Union
- Country: Bangladesh
- Division: Khulna
- District: Jessore
- Upazila: Sharsha

Area
  - Total: 65.68 km^{2} (25.36 sq mi)

Population (2011)
  - Total: 23,108
  - Density: 351.8/km^{2} (911.2/sq mi)
- Time zone: UTC+6 (BST)
- Website: nizampurup.jessore.gov.bd

Nizampur Union (Bengali: নিজামপুর ইউনিয়ন) is a Union Parishad under Sharsha Upazila of Jessore District in the division of Khulna, Bangladesh. It has an area of 23.36 square kilometres and a population of 23,108.
