= Kayba Union =

Union in Khulna, Bangladesh

Kayba Union কায়বা ইউনিয়ন
- Union
- Kayba Union
- Country: Bangladesh
- Division: Khulna
- District: Jessore
- Upazila: Sharsha

Area
  - Total: 82.96 km^{2} (32.03 sq mi)

Population (2011)
  - Total: 38,965
  - Density: 469.7/km^{2} (1,216/sq mi)
- Time zone: UTC+6 (BST)
- Website: kaybaup.jessore.gov.bd

Kayba Union (Bengali: কায়বা ইউনিয়ন) is a union parishad under Sharsha Upazila of Jessore District in the division of Khulna, Bangladesh. It has an area of 32.03 square kilometres and a population of 38,965.
