= Ramnagar Union, Jessore Sadar =

Ramnagar Union রামনগর ইউনিয়ন
- Union
- Location in Bangladesh
- Coordinates: 23.1081°N 89.2446°E
- Country: Bangladesh
- Division: Khulna Division
- District: Jessore District
- Upazila: Jessore Sadar Upazila

Government
  - Type: Union council
- Time zone: UTC+6 (BST)
- Website: ramnagarup.jessore.gov.bd

Ramnagar Union (Bengali: রামনগর ইউনিয়ন) is a union parishad in Jessore Sadar Upazila of Jessore District, in Khulna Division, Bangladesh.
