= Nirbaskhola Union =

Nirbaskhola Union নির্বাসখোলা ইউনিয়ন
- Union
- Nirbaskhola Union
- Country: Bangladesh
- Division: Khulna
- District: Jessore
- Upazila: Jhikargacha

Area
  - Total: 53.92 km^{2} (20.82 sq mi)

Population (2011)
  - Total: 13,526
  - Density: 250.9/km^{2} (649.7/sq mi)
- Time zone: UTC+6 (BST)
- Website: nibaskholaup.jessore.gov.bd

Nirbaskhola Union (Bengali: নির্বাসখোলা ইউনিয়ন), is a union parishad of the Jessore District in the Division of Khulna, Bangladesh. It has an area of 20.82 square kilometres and a population of 13,526.
