= Bagachra Union =

Union in Khulna, Bangladesh

Baganchra Union বাগআঁচড়া ইউনিয়ন
- Union
- Bagachra Union
- Country: Bangladesh
- Division: Khulna
- District: Jessore
- Upazila: Sharsha

Area
  - Total: 80.50 km^{2} (31.08 sq mi)

Population (2011)
  - Total: 38,965
  - Density: 484.0/km^{2} (1,254/sq mi)
- Time zone: UTC+6 (BST)
- Website: bagachraup.jessore.gov.bd

Baganchra Union (Bengali: বাগআঁচড়া ইউনিয়ন) is a Union Parishad under Sharsha Upazila of Jessore District in the division of Khulna, Bangladesh. It has an area of 31.08 square kilometres and a population of 38,965.
