= Mongolkot Union =

Union in Khulna, Bangladesh

Mongolkot Union মঙ্গলকোট ইউনিয়ন
- Union
- Mongolkot Union
- Location within Bangladesh
- Coordinates: 22.8632°N 89.2593°E
- Country: Bangladesh
- Division: Khulna
- District: Jessore
- Upazila: Keshabpur

Area
  - Total: 14.70 km^{2} (5.68 sq mi)

Population (2011)
  - Total: 23,288
  - Density: 1,584/km^{2} (4,103/sq mi)
- Time zone: UTC+6 (BST)
- Website: mongolkotup.jessore.gov.bd

Mongolkot Union (Bengali: মঙ্গলকোট ইউনিয়ন), is a union parishad of the Jessore District in the Division of Khulna, Bangladesh. It has an area of 14.70 square kilometres and a population of 23288. It consists of people of many religions and diversities. It is notable for its vast majority of Hindu populous. Majority of the population of Mongolkot is Hindu. It also is home to many outstanding vigilante poets/writers known to hold great knowledge.
