= Shankarpur Union =

Shankarpur Union শংকরপুর ইউনিয়ন
- Union
- Shankarpur Union
- Location within Bangladesh
- Coordinates: 22.9533°N 88.9885°E
- Country: Bangladesh
- Division: Khulna
- District: Jessore
- Upazila: Jhikargacha

Government
  - Chairman: Gobind Chatterjee

Area
  - Total: 53.92 km^{2} (20.82 sq mi)

Population (2011)
  - Total: 28,526
  - Density: 529.0/km^{2} (1,370/sq mi)
- Time zone: UTC+6 (BST)
- Website: shankarpurup.jessore.gov.bd

Shankarpur Union (Bengali: শংকরপুর ইউনিয়ন), is a union parishad of the Jessore District in the Division of Khulna, Bangladesh. It has an area of 20.82 square kilometres and a population of 28,526.
