= Noapara, Jessore =

Noapara নওয়াপাড়া
- Town and Municipality
- Location in Bangladesh Noapara (Bangladesh)
- Coordinates: 23.029°N 89.396°E
- Country: Bangladesh
- Division: Khulna
- District: Jessore
- Upazila: Abhaynagar

Government
  - Type: Municipality
  - Body: Noapara Paurashava
  - Paura Mayor: Shushanto Kumar Das

Area
  - Total: 25.1 km^{2} (9.7 sq mi)

Population (2022)
  - Total: 96,058
  - Density: 3,830/km^{2} (9,910/sq mi)
- Time zone: UTC+6 (BST)

Noapara (Bengali: নওয়াপাড়া) is a major town and municipality in Jessore District in the division of Khulna, Bangladesh. It is one of the major urban centres of Abhaynagar Upazila. It is situated along the Bhairab River.

== Demographics ==
Religions in Noapara (2011)
Religion	Percent
Islam	90.25%
Hinduism	9.47%
Other or not stated	0.28%

According to the 2022 Bangladesh census, Noapara city had a population of 96,058 and a literacy rate of 82.19%.

According to the 2011 Bangladesh census, Noapara city had 21,267 households and a population of 85,856. 16,299 (18.98%) were under 10 years of age. Noapara had a literacy rate (age 7 and over) of 63.67%, compared to the national average of 51.8%, and a sex ratio of 978 females per 1000 males.
