= Keshabpur Govt. Pilot Higher Secondary School =

- কেশবপুর সরকারি পাইলট উচ্চ মাধ্যমিক বিদ্যালয়

Location
- Balia Danga; Keshabpur, Jessore; 7450; Bangladesh; 22.8180°N 89.2167°E

Information
- Type: high school
- Motto: Read in the name of your God
- Established: 2 January 1942; 84 years ago
- Principal: Assadurzzam
- Faculty: 56
- Grades: 6 to 12
- Enrollment: 900
- Language: Bengali
- Campus size: Large
- Campus type: urban
- Nickname: KGPSC
- Affiliation: Board of Intermediate and Secondary Education, Jashore
- Website: keshabpurhighersecondaryschool.jessoreboard.gov.bd

Keshabpur Govt. Pilot Higher Secondary School is an educational institution located in A S K Sadek Road, Balia Danga, Keshabpur, Jessore.

== History ==
The institution was established on 2 January 1942 as a non-government school. In 2018, the institution was nationalized by the government.

The school established a hostel in 2004 and named it 'Shaheed Zia Hostel' after Bangladesh National Party (BNP) founder Ziaur Rahman. The BNP were in government at the time. In 2012, after the Awami League (AL) came to power, the signboard with Zia's name was quietly removed. Twelve years later, after a mass uprising forced out the AL government, the sign was reinstalled.
