= Panisara Union =

Panisara Union পানিসারা ইউনিয়ন
- Union
- Panisara Union
- Country: Bangladesh
- Division: Khulna
- District: Jessore
- Upazila: Jhikorgachha

Area
  - Total: 63.48 km^{2} (24.51 sq mi)

Population (2011)
  - Total: 13,526
  - Density: 213.1/km^{2} (551.9/sq mi)
- Time zone: UTC+6 (BST)
- Website: panisaraup.jessore.gov.bd

Panisara Union (Bengali: পানিসারা ইউনিয়ন), is a union parishad of Jhikargacha Upazila in the Jessore District in the Division of Khulna, Bangladesh. It has an area of 24.51 square kilometres and a population of 13,526.
