= Payra Union =

Payra Union পায়রা ইউনিয়ন
- Union
- Payra Union
- Country: Bangladesh
- Division: Khulna
- District: Jessore
- Upazila: Abhaynagar
- Time zone: UTC+6 (BST)
- Website: payraup.jessore.gov.bd

Payra Union (Bengali: পায়রা ইউনিয়ন) is a union parishad situated at Abhaynagar Upazila, in Jessore District, Khulna Division of Bangladesh.
