= Majidpur Union, Keshabpur =

Union in Khulna, Bangladesh

Majidpur Union মজিদপুর ইউনিয়ন
- Union
- Majidpur Union
- Location within Bangladesh
- Coordinates: 22.8862°N 89.2093°E
- Country: Bangladesh
- Division: Khulna
- District: Jessore
- Upazila: Keshabpur
- Established: April 14, 1965

Area
  - Total: 24.72 km^{2} (9.54 sq mi)

Population (2011)
  - Total: 24,424
  - Density: 988.0/km^{2} (2,559/sq mi)
- Time zone: UTC+6 (BST)
- Website: majidpurup.jessore.gov.bd

Majidpur Union (Bengali: মজিদপুর ইউনিয়ন), is a union parishad of the Jessore District in the Division of Khulna, Bangladesh. It has an area of 24.72 square kilometres and a population of 24424.
