= Putkhali Union =

Putkhali Union পুটখালী ইউনিয়ন
- Union
- Putkhali Union
- Country: Bangladesh
- Division: Khulna
- District: Jessore
- Upazila: Sharsha

Area
  - Total: 131.65 km^{2} (50.83 sq mi)

Population (2011)
  - Total: 40,700
  - Density: 309/km^{2} (801/sq mi)
- Time zone: UTC+6 (BST)
- Website: putkhaliup.jessore.gov.bd

Putkhali Union (Bengali: পুটখালী ইউনিয়ন) is a Union Parishad under Sharsha Upazila of Jessore District in the division of Khulna, Bangladesh. It has an area of 50.83 square kilometres and a population of 40,700.
