= Benapole Union =

Benapole Union বেনাপোল ইউনিয়ন
- Union
- Benapole Union
- Country: Bangladesh
- Division: Khulna
- District: Jessore
- Upazila: Sharsha
- Time zone: UTC+6 (BST)
- Website: benapoleup.jessore.gov.bd

Benapole Union (Bengali: বেনাপোল ইউনিয়ন) is a Union Parishad under Sharsha Upazila of Jessore District in the division of Khulna, Bangladesh.
