= Gadkhali Union =

Gadkhali Union গদখালী ইউনিয়ন
- Union
- Gadkhali Union
- Location within Bangladesh
- Coordinates: 23.0955°N 89.0626°E
- Country: Bangladesh
- Division: Khulna
- District: Jessore
- Upazila: Jhikargacha

Area
  - Total: 63.84 km^{2} (24.65 sq mi)

Population (2011)
  - Total: 36,892
  - Density: 577.9/km^{2} (1,497/sq mi)
- Time zone: UTC+6 (BST)
- Website: gadkhaliup.jessore.gov.bd

Gadkhali Union (Bengali: গদখালী ইউনিয়ন) is a union parishad of the Jessore District in the Division of Khulna, Bangladesh. It has an area of 24.65 square kilometres and a population of 36,892.
