= Prambag Union =

Union in Khulna, Bangladesh

Prambag Union প্রেমবাগ ইউনিয়ন
- Union
- Prambag Union
- Location within Bangladesh
- Coordinates: 23.0948°N 89.3534°E
- Country: Bangladesh
- Division: Khulna
- District: Jessore
- Upazila: Abhaynagar

Area
  - Total: 35.86 km^{2} (13.85 sq mi)

Population (2001)
  - Total: 20,155
  - Density: 562.0/km^{2} (1,456/sq mi)
- Time zone: UTC+6 (BST)
- Website: prambagup.jessore.gov.bd

Prambag Union (Bengali: প্রেমবাগ ইউনিয়ন) is a union parishad of Abhaynagar Upazila, in Jessore District, Khulna Division of Bangladesh. The union has an area of 35.86 square kilometres (13.85 sq mi) and as of 2001 had a population of 20,155, of which 10,437 were male and 9718 were female.
