= Shubharara Union =

Shubharara Union শুভরাড়া ইউনিয়ন
- Union
- Shubharara Union
- Location within Bangladesh
- Coordinates: 23.0066°N 89.5009°E
- Country: Bangladesh
- Division: Khulna
- District: Jessore
- Upazila: Abhaynagar
- Time zone: UTC+6 (BST)
- Website: subhararaup.jessore.gov.bd

Shubharara Union (Bengali: প্রেমবাগ ইউনিয়ন) is a union parishad of Abhaynagar Upazila, in Jessore District, Khulna Division of Bangladesh.
