= Jhikargacha Union =

Union in Khulna, Bangladesh

Jhikargacha Union ঝিকরগাছা ইউনিয়ন
- Union
- Jhikargacha Union
- Country: Bangladesh
- Division: Khulna
- District: Jessore
- Upazila: Jhikargacha

Area
  - Total: 69.36 km^{2} (26.78 sq mi)

Population (2011)
  - Total: 27,623
  - Density: 398.3/km^{2} (1,031/sq mi)
- Time zone: UTC+6 (BST)
- Website: jhikargachhaup.jessore.gov.bd

Jhikargacha Union (Bengali: গঙ্গানন্দপুর ইউনিয়ন), is a union parishad of the Jessore District in the Division of Khulna, Bangladesh. It has an area of 26.78 square kilometres and a population of 27,623.
