= Lakshmanpur Union, Sharsha =

Union in Khulna, Bangladesh

Lakshmanpur Union লক্ষণপুর ইউনিয়ন
- Union
- Lakshmanpur Union
- Country: Bangladesh
- Division: Khulna
- District: Jessore
- Upazila: Sharsha

Area
  - Total: 70.30 km^{2} (27.14 sq mi)

Population (2011)
  - Total: 25,630
  - Density: 364.6/km^{2} (944.3/sq mi)
- Time zone: UTC+6 (BST)
- Website: lakshmanpurup.jessore.gov.bd

Lakshmanpur Union (Bengali: লক্ষণপুর ইউনিয়ন) is a Union Parishad under Sharsha Upazila of Jessore District in the division of Khulna, Bangladesh. It has an area of 27.14 square kilometres and a population of 25,630.
