= Panjia Union =

Union in Khulna, Bangladesh

Panjia Union পাঁজিয়া ইউনিয়ন
- Union
- Panjia Union
- Location within Bangladesh
- Coordinates: 22.9070°N 89.2881°E
- Country: Bangladesh
- Division: Khulna
- District: Jessore
- Upazila: Keshabpur

Area
  - Total: 28.72 km^{2} (11.09 sq mi)

Population (2011)
  - Total: 30,301
  - Density: 1,055/km^{2} (2,733/sq mi)
- Time zone: UTC+6 (BST)
- Website: panjiaup.jessore.gov.bd

Panjia Union (Bengali: পাজিয়া ইউনিয়ন), is a union parishad of the Jessore District in the Division of Khulna, Bangladesh. It has an area of 28.72 square kilometres and a population of 30301.
