= Keshabpur Union, Keshabpur =

Union in Khulna, Bangladesh

Keshabpur Union কেশবপুর ইউনিয়ন
- Union
- Keshabpur Union
- Country: Bangladesh
- Division: Khulna
- District: Jessore
- Upazila: Keshabpur

Area
  - Total: 15 km^{2} (5.8 sq mi)

Population (2011)
  - Total: 22,000
  - Density: 1,500/km^{2} (3,800/sq mi)
- Time zone: UTC+6 (BST)
- Website: keshabpurup.jessore.gov.bd

Keshabpur Union (Bengali: কেশবপুর ইউনিয়ন), is a union parishad of the Jessore District in the Division of Khulna, Bangladesh. It has an area of 15 square kilometres and a population of 22000.
