= Bidyanandakati Union =

Union in Khulna, Bangladesh

Bidyanandakati Union বিদ্যানন্দকাটি ইউনিয়ন
- Union
- Bidyanandakati Union
- Location within Bangladesh
- Coordinates: 22.8510°N 89.2138°E
- Country: Bangladesh
- Division: Khulna
- District: Jessore
- Upazila: Keshabpur

Area
  - Total: 20.90 km^{2} (8.07 sq mi)

Population (2011)
  - Total: 34,032
  - Density: 1,628/km^{2} (4,217/sq mi)
- Time zone: UTC+6 (BST)
- Website: bidyanandakatiup.jessore.gov.bd

Bidyanandakati Union (Bengali: বিদ্যানন্দকাটি ইউনিয়ন) is a union parishad of the Jessore District in the Division of Khulna, Bangladesh. It has an area of 20.90 square kilometres and a population of 34,032.
