= Hasanpur Union =

Union in Khulna, Bangladesh

Hasanpur Union হাসানপুর ইউনিয়ন
- Union
- Hasanpur Union
- Country: Bangladesh
- Division: Khulna
- District: Jessore
- Upazila: Keshabpur

Population (2011)
  - Total: 21,321
- Time zone: UTC+6 (BST)
- Website: hasanpurup.jessore.gov.bd

Hasanpur Union (Bengali: হাসানপুর ইউনিয়ন), is a union parishad of the Jessore District in the Division of Khulna, Bangladesh.
