= Abhaynagar Upazila =

Abhaynagar অভয়নগর
- Upazila
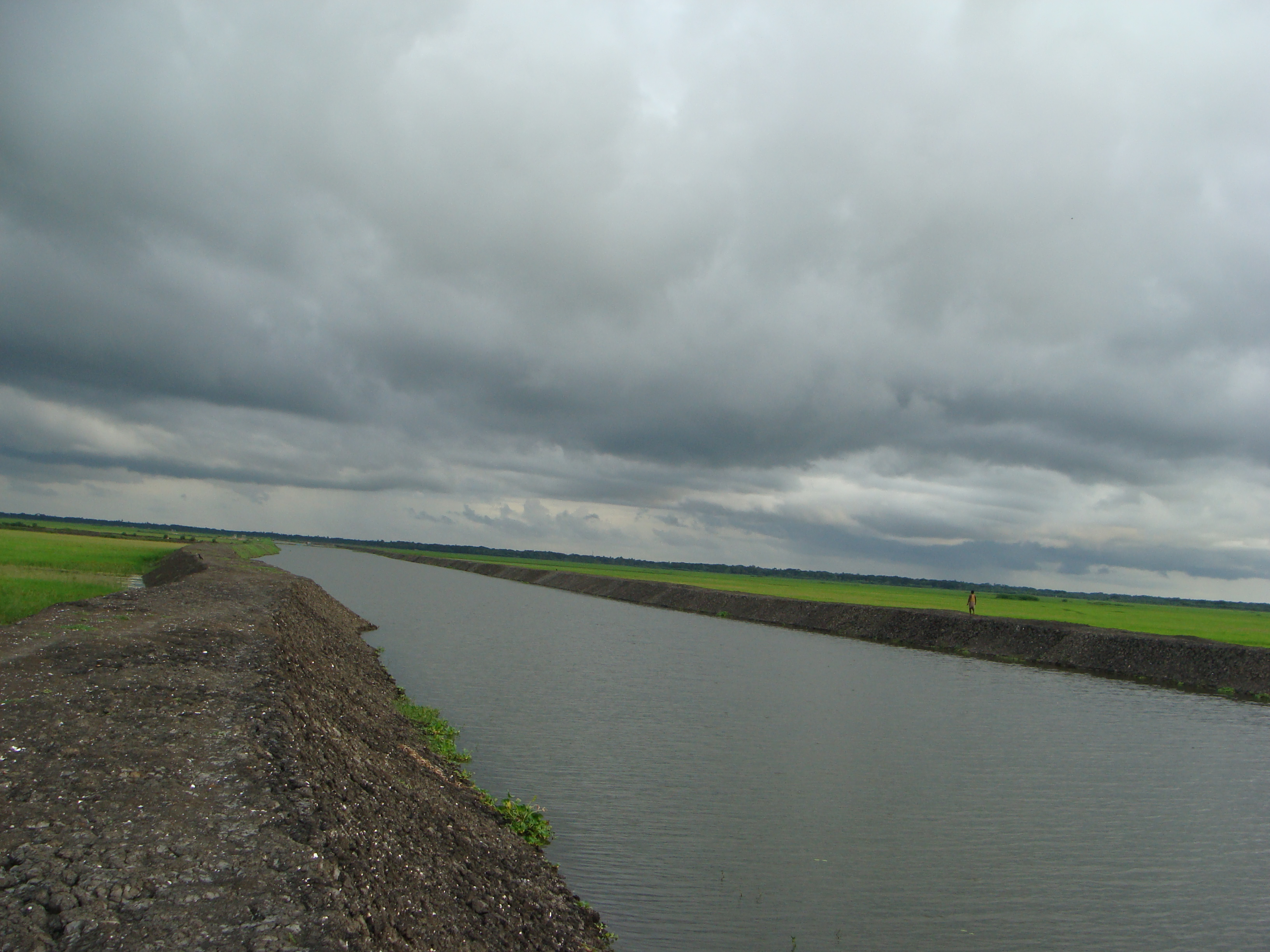
- Mukteshwari River, Abhaynagar

- Coordinates: 23°1′N 89°26′E
- Country: Bangladesh
- Division: Khulna
- District: Jessore
- Seat: Noapara

Area
  - Total: 247.21 km^{2} (95.45 sq mi)

Population (2022)
  - Total: 290,143
  - Density: 1,173.7/km^{2} (3,039.8/sq mi)
- Time zone: UTC+6 (BST)
- Postal code: 7460
- Area code: 04222
- Website: Official Map of Abhaynagar

Abhaynagar Upazila mauza geocode map

Abhaynagar (Bengali: অভয়নগর) is an upazila of Jessore District in the division of Khulna, Bangladesh.

== History ==
During the Bangladesh Liberation war, staff of the Noapara Railway Station were killed by members of Pakistan Army on 27 March 1971. The Pakistan Army killed 17 members of Mukti Bahini including Assistant Secretary of Bangladesh Awami League Nazibor Rahman.

On 4 December 2005 over 300,000 people of Abhaynagar took to the roads and blocked the Jessore-Khulna Highway in the Nowapaara industrial area to protest against a longstanding waterlogging problem. The protest followed a silt removal drive by 25,000 people in the Sri River at Vobodoho sluice gate on November 9. Over 100 people were injured in violent clashes during the protest.

== Demographics ==
Religions in Abhaynagar Upazila (2022)
Religion	Percent
Islam	83.19%
Hinduism	16.70%
Other or not stated	0.11%

Population by religion in Union/Paurashava
Union/Paurashava	Muslim	Hindu	Others
Noapara Paurashava	87,582	8,273	203
Baghutia Union	19,131	5,212	10
Chalishia Union	16,642	4,694	40
Payra Union	13,960	5,596	2
Prambag Union	23,117	2,173	2
Shubharara Union	23,426	3,240	1
Siddhipasha Union	23,783	5,309	0
Sreedharpur Union	31,976	4,011	4
Sundoli Union	1,740	9,952	57

🟩 Muslim majority 🟧 Hindu majority

According to the 2022 Bangladeshi census, Abhaynagar Upazila had 73,915 households and a population of 290,143. 8.36% of the population were under 5 years of age. Abhaynagar had a literacy rate (age 7 and over) of 77.76%: 80.53% for males and 75.02% for females, and a sex ratio of 99.17 males for every 100 females. 132,189 (45.56%) lived in urban areas.

As of the 2011 Census of Bangladesh, Abhaynagar upazila had 62,189 households and a population of 262,434. 51,171 (19.50%) were under 10 years of age. Abhaynagar had an average literacy rate of 59.80%, compared to the national average of 51.8%, and a sex ratio of 990 females per 1,000 males. 85,856 (32.72%) of the population lived in urban areas. Ethnic population was 4,232 (1.61%).

In the 1991 Bangladesh census, Abhaynagar's population was 204,654, with males constituting 52.06% of the population and females 47.94%. The population aged 18 or above was 110,761, with a literacy rate of 38.8% (7+ years) compared to a national average of 32.4%.

== Economy ==
The principal agricultural products are rice, wheat, jute, potatoes, garlic, onions, mustard, betel nuts, brinjal and vegetables. The principal industrial products are jute, textiles, leather, salt and cement:

== Points of interest ==
Among the archeological interests in Abhaynagar are Siddhipasha Rajbari with its adjacent tank and temple, 11 Duari Mandir, Madhayapur Neelkuthi and Sreedharpur Zamindar Bari. Three periodicals are published: the weekly Mukti and Uddipan, and the monthly Mukul.

== Administration ==
Abhaynagar Upazila is divided into Noapara Municipality and eight union parishads: Baghutia, Chalishia, Payra, Prambag, Siddhipasha, Sreedharpur, SubvoPara, and Sundoli. The union parishads are subdivided into 89 mauzas and 106 villages.

== See also ==
- Upazilas of Bangladesh
- Districts of Bangladesh
- Divisions of Bangladesh
