= Magura Union, Jhikargacha =

Magura Union মাগুরা ইউনিয়ন
- Union
- Magura Union
- Location within Bangladesh
- Coordinates: 23.1617°N 89.0526°E
- Country: Bangladesh
- Division: Khulna
- District: Jessore
- Upazila: Chaugachha

Area
  - Total: 66.25 km^{2} (25.58 sq mi)

Population (2011)
  - Total: 13,526
  - Density: 204.2/km^{2} (528.8/sq mi)
- Time zone: UTC+6 (BST)
- Website: maguraup.jessore.gov.bd

Magura Union (Bengali: মাগুরা ইউনিয়ন), is a union parishad of the Jessore District in the Division of Khulna, Bangladesh. It has an area of 25.58 square kilometres (9.88 sq mi) and a population of 13526.
