= Trimohini Union =

Trimohini Union ত্রিমোহিনী ইউনিয়ন
- Union
- Location within Bangladesh
- Coordinates: 22.9057°N 89.1388°E
- Country: Bangladesh
- Division: Khulna
- District: Jessore
- Upazila: Keshabpur
- Time zone: UTC+6 (BST)
- Website: trimohiniup.jessore.gov.bd

Trimohini Union (Bengali: ত্রিমোহিনী ইউনিয়ন), is a union parishad of Jessore District in the Division of Khulna, Bangladesh.
