= Keshabpur, Howrah =

Keshabpur
- Census Town
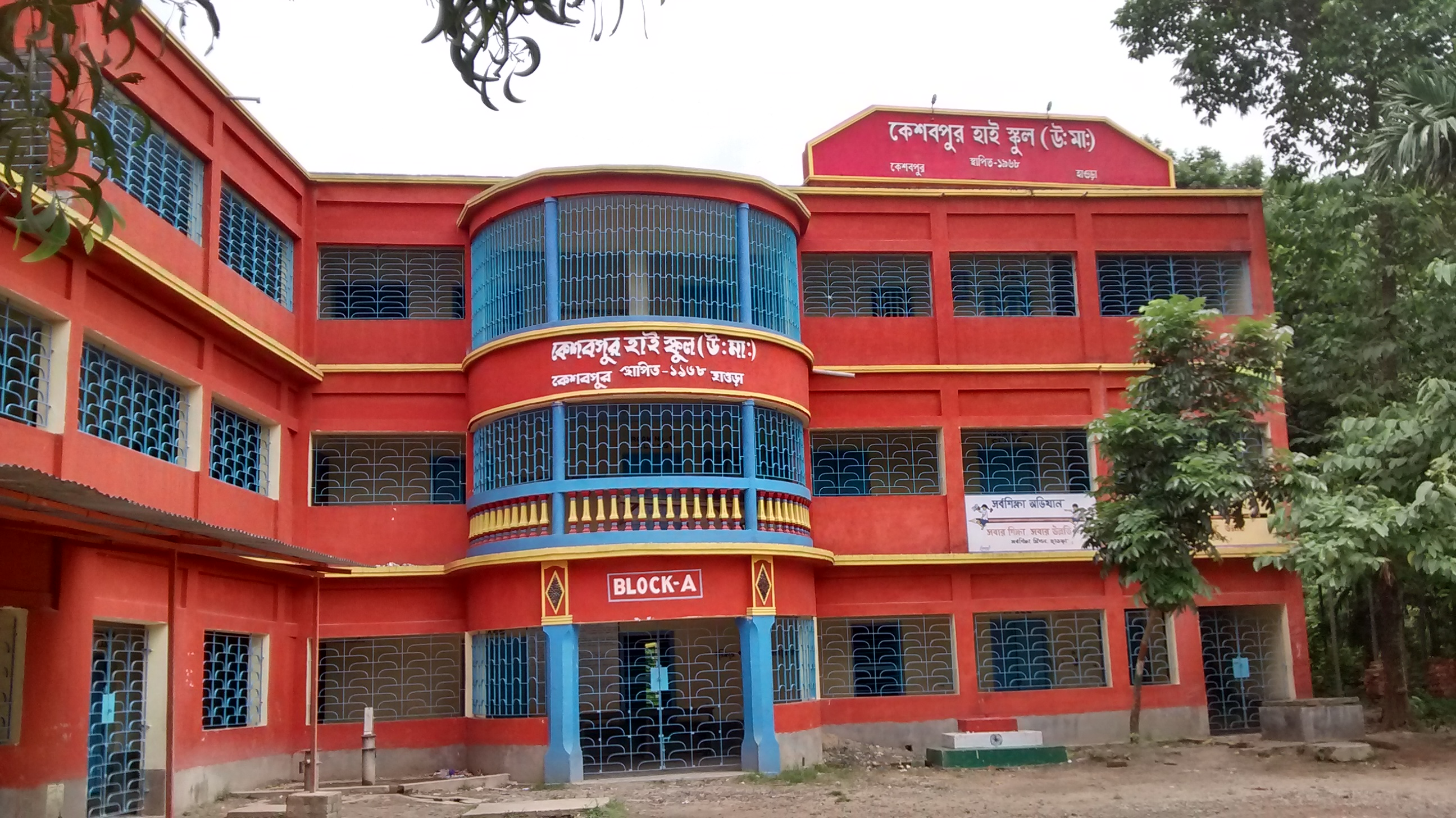
- Keshabpur High School

- Location in West Bengal, India
- Coordinates: 22.617417°N 88.191444°E
- Country: India
- State: West Bengal
- District: Howrah

Government
  - Type: Parliamentary republics

Area
  - Total: 3 km^{2} (1.2 sq mi)

Population (2001)
  - Total: 5,773
  - Density: 1,900/km^{2} (5,000/sq mi)

Languages
  - Official: Bengali, English
- Time zone: UTC+5:30 (IST)
- Postal code: 711411
- Lok Sabha constituency: Sreerampur
- Vidhan Sabha constituency: Rudrapur
- Website: howrah.gov.in

Keshabpur is a census town under Domjur police station in Sadar subdivision of Howrah district in the Indian state of West Bengal.

== Geography ==
Keshabpur is located at 22°37′02.7″N 88°11′29.2″E
