= Bagherpara Upazila =

Bagharpara বাঘারপাড়া
- Upazila
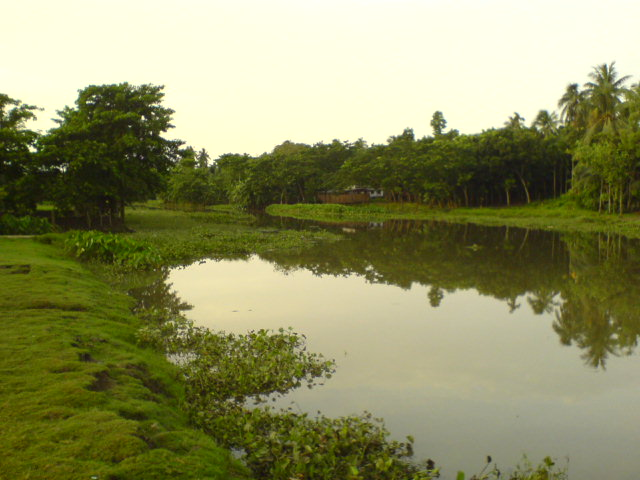
- Bhairab River at Bagherpara Upazila

- Coordinates: 23°13′N 89°21′E
- Country: Bangladesh
- Division: Khulna
- District: Jessore

Area
  - Total: 308.29 km^{2} (119.03 sq mi)

Population (2022)
  - Total: 238,106
  - Density: 772.34/km^{2} (2,000.4/sq mi)
- Time zone: UTC+6 (BST)
- Postal code: 7470
- Area code: 04223
- Website: Official Map of Bagherpara

Bagherpara Upazila mauza geocode map

Bagherpara (Bengali: বাঘারপাড়া) is an upazila of Jessore District in the Division of Khulna, Bangladesh.

== Geography ==
Bagherpara is located at 23.2167°N 89.3500°E. It has a total area of 308.29 km^{2}. It is bordered by Jhenaidah district to the north, Magura and Narail districts to the east, and Jessore Sadar upazila to the west.

== Demographics ==
Religions in Bagherpara Upazila (2022)
Religion	Percent
Islam	85.20%
Hinduism	14.77%
Other or not stated	0.03%

According to the 2022 Bangladeshi census, Bagherpara Upazila had 60,247 households and a population of 238,106. 9.10% of the population were under 5 years of age. Bagherpara had a literacy rate (age 7 and over) of 74.18%: 76.34% for males and 72.16% for females, and a sex ratio of 94.99 males for every 100 females. 24,055 (10.10%) lived in urban areas.

As of the 2011 Census of Bangladesh, Bagherpara upazila had 49,971 households and a population of 261,897. 43,882 (16.76%) inhabitants were under 10 years of age. Bagherpara's literacy rate was 52.79%, compared to the national average of 51.8%, and a sex ratio of 1016 females per 1000 males. 8,290 (3.17%) of the population lived in urban areas.

As of the 1991 Bangladesh census, Bagherpara has a population of 168,938. Males constituted 51.21% of the population, and females 48.79%; this Upazila's eighteen-up population was 84303. Bagherpara has an average literacy rate of 34.5% (7+ years), and the national average of 32.4% literate.

== Administration ==
Bagherpara Upazila is divided into Bagherpara Municipality and nine union parishads: Bandabilla, Basuari, Darajhat, Dhalgram, Dohakula, Jaharpur, Jamdia, Narikelbaria, and Roypur. The union parishads are subdivided into 155 mauzas and 191 villages.

Bagherpara Municipality is subdivided into 9 wards and 12 mahallas.

== Education ==
- Azampur Islamia Alim Madrasah
- Azampur Darus-Sunnah Hafezia and Nurani Madrasah
- Sekenderpur Secondary School
- Gaidghat High School
- Agra Secondary school
- Charavita Secondary School
- PHL Secondary High School
- Bagherpara Pilot High School
- Bagherpara Pilot Girls High School
- Bagherpara Degree College
- Bagherpara Mohilla College
- Raipur School & College
- Selumpur High school
- Karimpur High School
- Bagherpara siddikiya fazil madrashah
- Narikelbariya degree college
- Narikelbariya high school
- Inra high school
- Dayarampur Siddikya Senior Madrasha.
- Borvagh high school.
- Vitaballah High School.
- C.S.A.High School.
- Japan Bangladesh Friendship Agricultural College.
- Jamdia High School.
- Jamdia Hafijia Dakhil Madrasha
- Khalshe Girls School.
- Dargahpur Fazil Degree Madrasha
- Andul Baria High School
- Bir Protik Ishaqe College, Dhalgr
- Karimpur Hafejia Dakhil Madrasa
- Vangura Ideal College
- Bagdanga primary school
- Sommillio Biddapit Bagdanga Bohumukhi Maddomik Biddaloy

== See also ==
- Upazilas of Bangladesh
- Districts of Bangladesh
- Divisions of Bangladesh
