= Jessore Sadar Upazila =

Jashore Sadar যশোর সদর
- Upazila
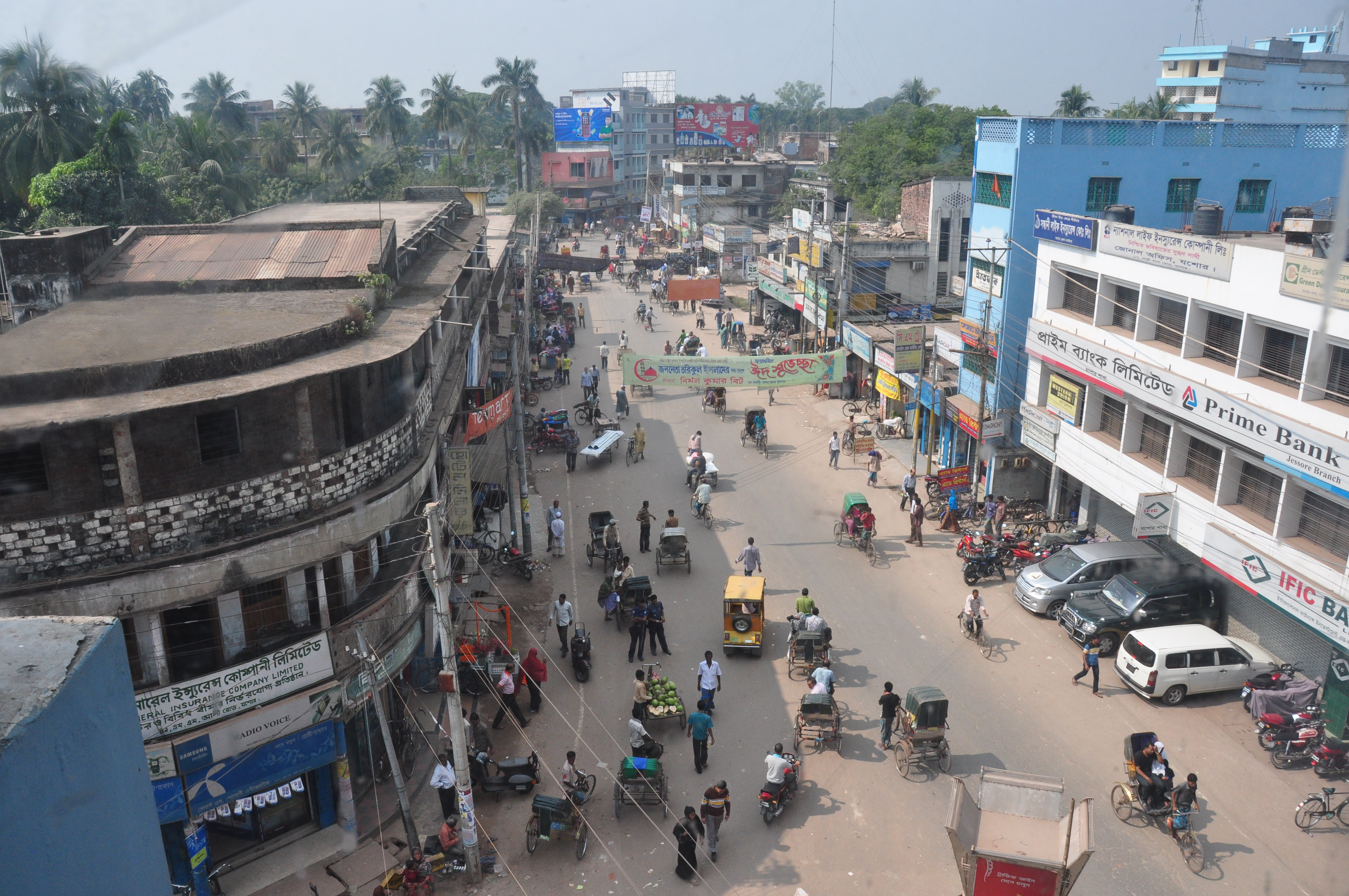
- Street in Jessore

- Coordinates: 23°10.1′N 89°12.3′E
- Country: Bangladesh
- Division: Khulna
- District: Jessore
- Headquarters: Jessore

Area
  - Total: 435.22 km^{2} (168.04 sq mi)

Population (2022)
  - Total: 844,374
  - Density: 1,940.1/km^{2} (5,024.9/sq mi)
- Time zone: UTC+6 (BST)
- Postal code: 7400
- Website: sadar.jessore.gov.bd

Jessore Sadar Upazila mauza geocode map

Jashore Sadar (Bengali: যশোর সদর) is an upazila of Jessore District in Khulna, Bangladesh. Its administrative centre is the city of Jessore, which is also the centre of the district.

== Geography ==
Jessore Sadar is located at 23.1681°N 89.2042°E. It has a total area of 435.40 km^{2}. The town of Jessore is on the banks of the Bhairab River. It is bordered by Jhenaidah District to the north, Bagherpara Upazila and Narail District to the east, Abhaynagar and Manirampur upazilas to the south, and Jhikargachha and Chaugachha upazilas to the west.

== Demographics ==
Religions in Jessore Sadar Upazila (2022)
| Religion | Percent |
| Islam | 91.63% |
| Hinduism | 8.15% |
| Other or not stated | 0.22% |

According to the 2022 Bangladeshi census, Jessore Sadar Upazila had 213,254 households and a population of 844,374. 8.46% of the population were under 5 years of age. Jessore Sadar had a literacy rate (age 7 and over) of 81.74%: 83.96% for males and 79.48% for females, and a sex ratio of 102.31 males for every 100 females. 280,404 (33.21%) lived in urban areas.

As of the 2011 Census of Bangladesh, Jessore Sadar upazila had 169,164 households and a population of 742,898. 140,370 (18.89%) were under 10 years of age. Jessore Sadar had a literacy rate of 63.80%, compared to the national average of 51.8%, and a sex ratio of 953 females per 1000 males. 253,019 (34.06%) of the population lived in urban areas.

As of the 1991 Bangladesh census, Jessore Sadar had a population of 530,582. Males constitute 52.85% of the population, and females 47.15%. This Upazila's eighteen-up population was 281,108. Jessore Sadar has an average literacy rate of 44.2% (7+ years), against the national average of 32.4% literate. According to the 2011 Bangladesh census, the upazila's population had grown to 742,898.

== Economy ==
As of 2011, the main source of income was agriculture, followed by commerce and services. Bukbhara Baor, a large oxbow lake in the western part of the upazila, is an important source of fish production.

== Administration ==
Jessore Sadar Upazila is divided into Jessore Municipality and 16 union parishads: Arabpur, Basundia, Chanchra, Churamankati, Diara, Fathehpur, Haibatpur, Ichhali, Kashimpur, Kachua, Lebutala, Narendrapur, Noapara, Ramnagar, Upashahar, and Jessore Cantonment. The union parishads are subdivided into 248 mauzas and 256 villages.

Jessore Municipality is subdivided into 9 wards and 75 mahallas.

It has one of the famous colleges of Bangladesh:

- Michael Modhushudon (MM) College

== Notable people ==
- Raushan Ali Bishwas (1921–1994), former Governor of Jessore, village Teghoria

== See also ==
- Upazilas of Bangladesh
- Districts of Bangladesh
- Divisions of Bangladesh
- Administrative geography of Bangladesh
