= Chaugachha Upazila =

Chaugachha চৌগাছা
- Upazila
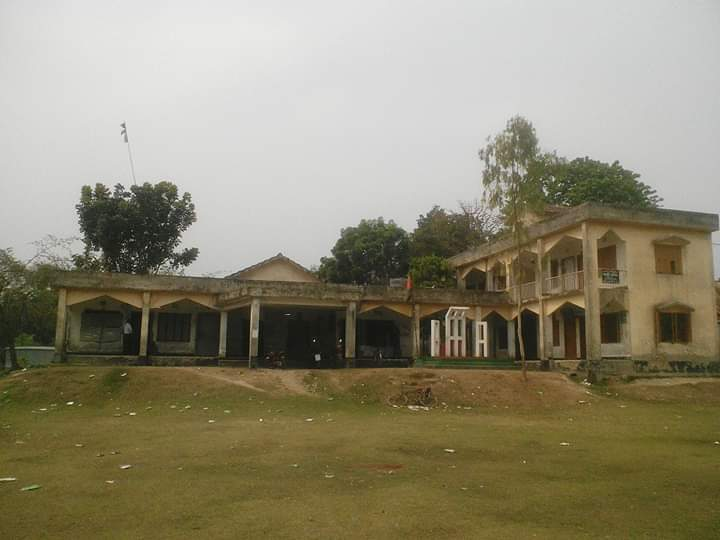
- Shimulia Union Parishad

- Coordinates: 23°16′N 89°1.5′E
- Country: Bangladesh
- Division: Khulna
- District: Jessore

Area
  - Total: 269.31 km^{2} (103.98 sq mi)

Population (2022)
  - Total: 249,280
  - Density: 925.62/km^{2} (2,397.4/sq mi)
- Time zone: UTC+6 (BST)
- Postal code: 7410
- Area code: 04224
- Website: Official Map of Chowgacha

Chaugachha Upazila mauza geocode map

Chowgacha (Bengali: চৌগাছা) is an upazila of Jessore District in the Division of Khulna, Bangladesh.

== History ==
There is a long history behind Chowgacha. It is named after four banyan trees besides the river. This is the first place in Bangladesh to get its freedom during the liberation war, on 6 December 1971.

== Geography ==
Chowgacha is located at 23.2667°N 89.0250°E. The main city is on the bank of the Kopothakho River. It has a total area of 269.31 km^{2}.

Chaugachha Upazila is bounded by Maheshpur, Kotchandpur and Kaliganj upazilas on the north, Jessore Sadar and Kaliganj upazilas on the east, Sharsha and Jhikargachha upazilas and Bagdah community development block in North 24 Parganas district in West Bengal, India on the south and Maheshpur Upazila on the west.

== Demographics ==
Religions in Chaugachha Upazila (2022)
Religion	Percent
Islam	93.23%
Hinduism	6.74%
Other or not stated	0.03%

According to the 2022 Bangladeshi census, Chaugachha Upazila had 67,242 households and a population of 249,280. 8.41% of the population were under 5 years of age. Chaugachha had a literacy rate (age 7 and over) of 73.44%: 75.58% for males and 71.38% for females, and a sex ratio of 96.99 males for every 100 females. 33,719 (13.53%) lived in urban areas.

As of the 2011 Census of Bangladesh, Chaugachha upazila had 56,440 households and a population of 231,370. 46,662 (20.17%) were under 10 years of age. Chaugachha's literacy rate was 53.70%, compared to the national average of 51.8%, and a sex ratio of 996 females per 1000 males. 21,422 (9.26%) of the population lived in urban areas.

As of the 1991 Bangladesh census, Chowgacha Upazila had a population of 189,829. Males constituted 51.6% of the population, and females 48.4%; 91,297 of the population were aged 18 or over. Chowgacha had an average literacy rate of 25.5% (7+ years), against the national average of 32.4% literate.

== Points of interest ==
Nilkuthi, Muktinagar, Bergobindopur Baor, Kharincha Baor, Jagdishpur Tula Firm, Kopotakkho Nod.

== Administration ==
Chaugachha Upazila is divided into Chaugachha Municipality and 11 union parishads: Chaugachha, Dhuliani, Hakimpur, Jagadishpur, Narayanpur, Pashapole, Patibila, Phulsara, Singhajhuli, Sukpukhuria, and Swarupdaha. The union parishads are subdivided into 150 mauzas and 154 villages.

Chaugachha Municipality is subdivided into 9 wards and 11 mahallas.

Principal, Mostanichur Rahman is the Upazila Chairman (2019 – present) of Chawgachha.

== Notable residents ==
- Shaheed Mashiur Rahman, lawyer, politician, and martyr in the War of Liberation, was born in Singhajhuli village in 1920.

== See also ==
- Upazilas of Bangladesh
- Districts of Bangladesh
- Divisions of Bangladesh
