= Monirul =

Monirul is a given name. Notable people with the name include:

- Monirul Haq Chowdhury, Bangladesh Nationalist Party politician and MP
- Quazi Munirul Huda, Bangladeshi politician, lawyer and MP
- Mohammad Monirul Islam (politician), Bangladesh Awami League politician and MP
- Monirul Islam (artist) (born 1943), Bangladeshi-Spanish artist
- Monirul Islam (Khulna cricketer), first-class and List A cricketer from Bangladesh
- Monirul Islam (police officer) (born 1970), Additional Inspector General of Police of Bangladesh Police
- Sheikh Md Monirul Islam, retired Major General of Bangladesh Army
- Kazi Monirul Islam Manu, Bangladesh Awami League politician and MP
- Monirul Haque Sakku, Bangladeshi politician and mayor
- Monirul Islam Tipu Politician of Narail District of Bangladesh and MP
