= Mostafa Faruk Mohammad =

Bangladeshi politician

Mostafa Faruque Mohammad
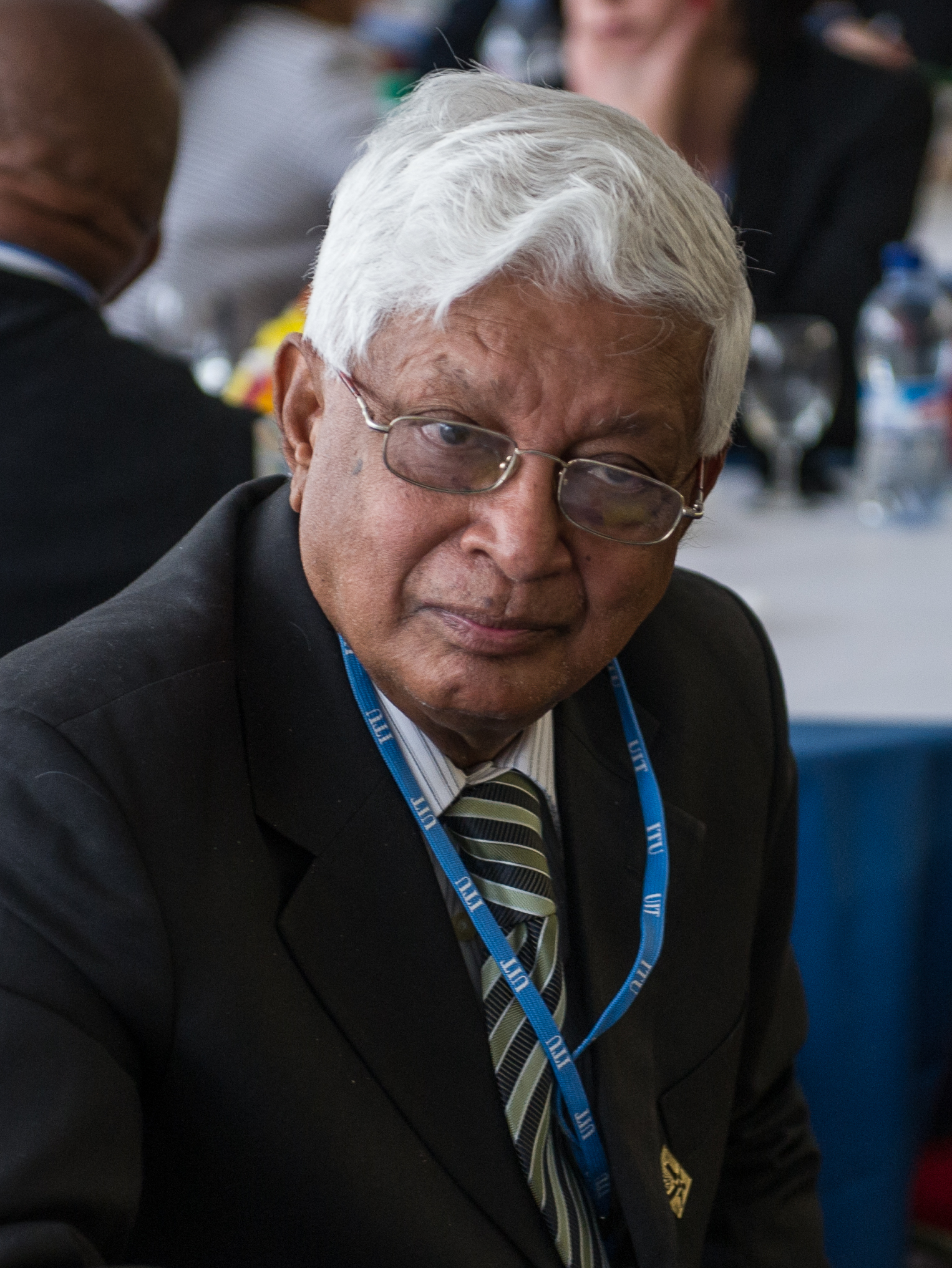
- Mohammad in Geneva (2013)

Minister of Information and Communication Technology (ICT)
- In office 13 September 2012 – 24 January 2014
- Preceded by: Syed Abul Hossain

Member of the Bangladesh Parliament for Jessore-2
- In office 29 December 2008 – 4 January 2014
- Preceded by: Abu Sayeed Md. Shahadat Hussain
- Succeeded by: Mohammad Monirul Islam

High Commissioner of Bangladesh to India
- In office 6 August 1999 – 31 December 2001
- Preceded by: C. M. Shafi Sami
- Succeeded by: Tufail Karim Haider

Ambassador of Bangladesh to Russia
- In office 3 February 1996 – 12 March 1999
- Preceded by: A. M. S. A. Amin
- Succeeded by: Ataur Rahman Khan Kaiser

Ambassador of Bangladesh to Myanmar
- In office 7 June 1990 – 6 November 1993
- Preceded by: A.Z.M. Enayetullah Khan
- Succeeded by: Md. Khalequzzaman

Personal details
- Born: 21 March 1942 Jessore, Bengal Province, British India
- Died: 4 January 2017 (aged 74) Dhaka, Bangladesh
- Party: Bangladesh Awami League

Mostafa Faruque Mohammad (21 March 1942 – 4 January 2017) was a Bangladesh Awami League politician and a member of Jatiya Sangsad representing the Jessore-2 constituency. He served as the Minister of Information and Communication Technology (ICT) during 2012–2014.

== Early life ==
Mohammad was born on 21 March 1942 in Krishnanagar, Jhikargachha Upazila, Jessore District, East Bengal, British Raj.

== Career ==
Mohammad was a diplomat in Egypt, India, Myanmar, Russia and Vietnam. In 1979, he worked as Bangladesh's alternative representative to the United Nation Security Council. He was elected to the parliament in 2008 from Jessore-2. He was a member of the Parliamentary Standing Committee on Foreign Affairs Ministry. He was made the minister of information and communication technology on 13 September 2012 replacing Syed Abul Hossain. He was a managing director of SAHCO, a company owned by Hossain.

== Death ==
Mohammad died on 4 January 2017.
