= Mohammad Moslehuddin Farid =

Bangladeshi politician

- মোহাম্মদ মোসলেহ উদ্দিন ফরিদ

Member of the Bangladesh Parliament for Jessore-2
- Incumbent
- Assumed office 17 February 2026
- Preceded by: Md Towhiduzzaman

Personal details
- Born: December 15, 1961 (age 64) Jhikargacha Upazila, Jessore District
- Party: Bangladesh Jamaat-e-Islami
- Parent: Mohammad Sharif Husain

Mohammad Moslehuddin Farid is a Bangladeshi politician of the Bangladesh Jamaat-e-Islami. He is currently serving as a member of parliament from Jessore-2.

== Early life ==
Farid was born on 15 November 1961 in Jhikargacha Upazila in Jessore District.
