= Sheikh Afil Uddin =

Bangladeshi politician

Member of the Bangladesh Parliament for Jessore-1
- In office 25 January 2009 – 6 August 2024
- Preceded by: Ali Kadar

Personal details
- Born: 6 May 1966 (age 60)
- Party: Bangladesh Awami League
- Relatives: Sheikh Bashir Uddin (brother)

Sheikh Afil Uddin (born 6 May 1966) is a Bangladesh Awami League politician and a former Jatiya Sangsad member representing the Jessore-1 constituency.

== Early life ==
Afil Uddin was born on 6 May 1966. His father, Sheikh Akij Uddin, is the founder of Akij Group. He is also related to fellow member of parliament Monirul Islam Monir.

== Career ==
Afil Uddin was elected to parliament in 2008. He was reelected to government in the 5 January 2014 elections unopposed. In the elections, a voice recording of his emerged in which he appeared to instruct fellow Awami League candidates on how to rig the elections.

Afil Uddin was re-elected in 2018 with 325,793 votes from Jessore-2 while his nearest rival, Abu Sayed Muhammad Shahadat Hussain of Bangladesh Nationalist Party, received 13,940 votes.
