= Mir Shahadatur Rahman =

Bangladeshi politician

- মীর শাহাদাতুর রহমান

Member of Parliament for Jessore-2
- In office 1988–1990
- Preceded by: Maqbool Hossain
- Succeeded by: Kazi Monirul Huda

Personal details
- Born: Jessore District
- Party: Jatiya Party

Mir Shahadatur Rahman is a politician of Jessore District of Bangladesh and former member of parliament for the Jessore-2 constituency in 1988.

== Birth and early life ==
Rahman was born in Jhikargachha in Jessore district.

== Career ==
Mir Shahadatur Rahman was associated with the politics of the Jatiya Party. He was elected to parliament from the Jessore-2 constituency in as an independent candidate in the 1988 Bangladeshi general election.
