= K. M. Nazrul Islam =

Bangladeshi politician

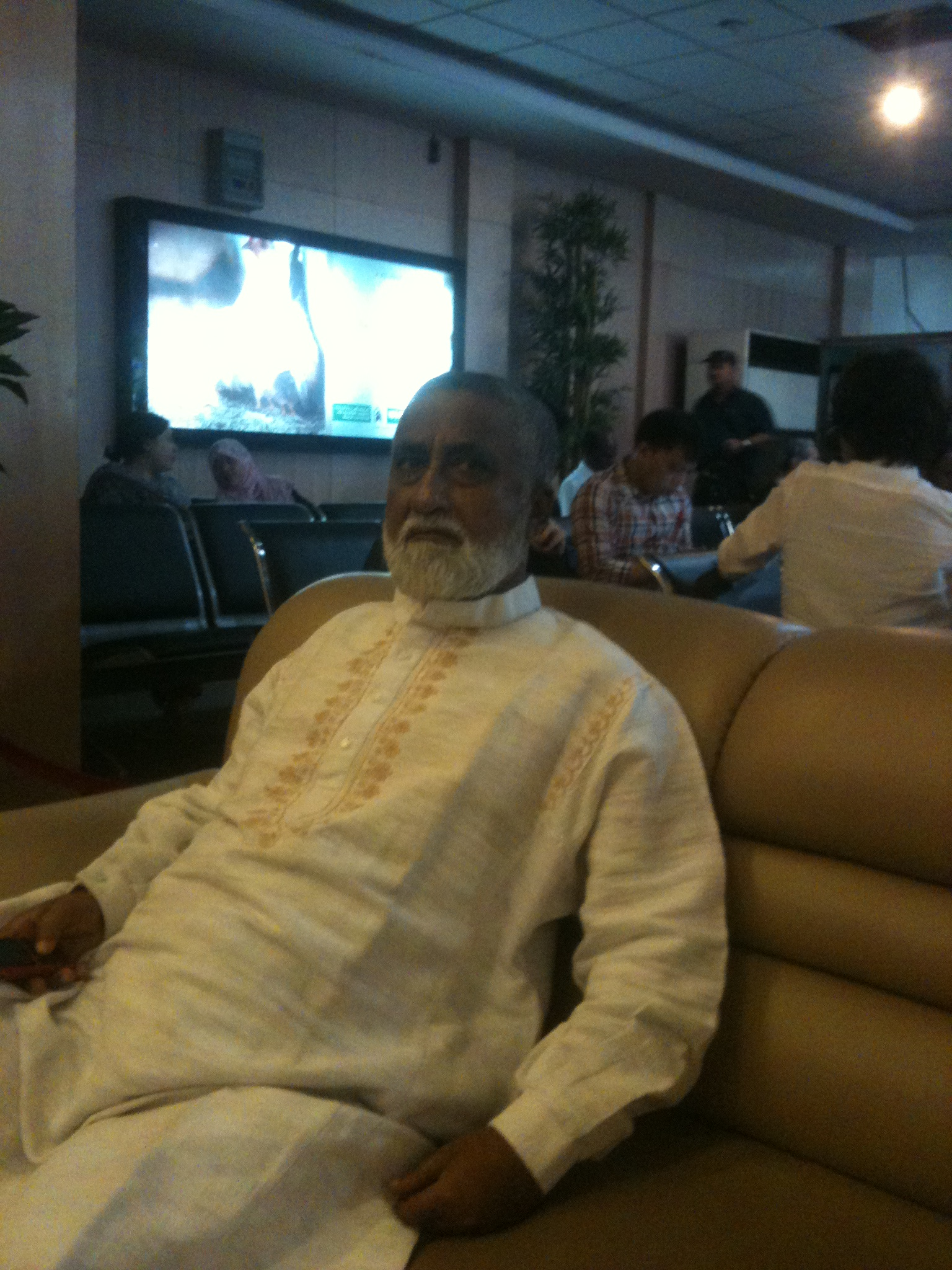

Member of Bangladesh Parliament
- In office 1988–1991
- Preceded by: Noor Hussain
- Succeeded by: Tabibar Rahman Sarder

Personal details
- Party: Jatiya Party (Ershad)

K. M. Nazrul Islam is a Jatiya Party (Ershad) politician in Bangladesh and a former member of parliament for Jessore-1.

== Career ==
Islam was elected to parliament from Jessore-1 as a Jatiya Party candidate in 1988. He contested the 2001 election as a candidate of Islami Jatiya Oikya Front but lost the election to the Bangladesh Nationalist Party candidate.
