= Sheikh Bashir Uddin =

Bangladeshi businessman

- শেখ বসির উদ্দিন
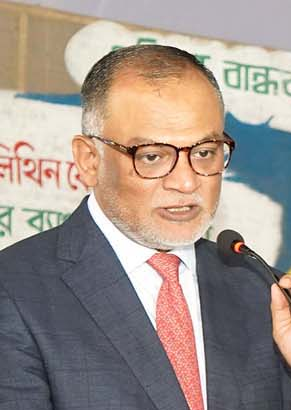
- Uddin in 2025

Adviser for Commerce
- In office 10 November 2024 – 17 February 2026
- President: Mohammed Shahabuddin
- Chief Adviser: Muhammad Yunus
- Preceded by: Salehuddin Ahmed
- Succeeded by: Khandaker Abdul Muktadir

Adviser for Textiles and Jute
- In office 10 November 2024 – 17 February 2026
- President: Mohammed Shahabuddin
- Chief Adviser: Muhammad Yunus
- Preceded by: M Sakhawat Hussain
- Succeeded by: Khandakar Abdul Muktadir

Adviser for Civil Aviation and Tourism
- In office 15 April 2025 – 17 February 2026
- President: Mohammed Shahabuddin
- Chief Adviser: Muhammad Yunus
- Preceded by: Muhammad Yunus
- Succeeded by: Afroza Khanam Rita

Chairman of Biman Bangladesh Airlines
- In office 26 August 2025 – 25 April 2026
- Chief adviser: Muhammad Yunus
- Preceded by: Abdul Muyeed Chowdhury
- Succeeded by: Rumee A Hossain

Personal details
- Born: 1974 (age 51–52) Jhikargacha Upazila, Jessore, Bangladesh
- Parent: Sheikh Akij Uddin (father)
- Relatives: Sheikh Afil Uddin (brother); Monirul Islam Moni
- Occupation: Businessmen, Adviser

Sheikh Bashir Uddin (Bengali: শেখ বসির উদ্দিন) is a Bangladeshi businessman and the managing director of Akij-Bashir Group, an industrial conglomerate in Bangladesh. He was an adviser to the Interim government of Bangladesh.

== Early life ==
He was born in 1974 in the village of Nabharan, Jhikargacha Upazila in Jessore District. He belonged to a Bengali Muslim family originally from the village of Madhyadanga in Phultala, Khulna District. His father, Sheikh Akij Uddin, was the founding chairman of Akij Group.

== Career ==
He took oath as an advisor on 10 November 2024. He is currently the adviser of Ministry of Commerce, Ministry of Textiles & Jute and Ministry of Civil Aviation and Tourism.
