= Quader =

Surname

Quader is a surname. Notable people with the surname include:

- Ali Quader, Bangladesh Nationalist Party politician, former Member of Parliament
- Frauke Quader, German-born Hyderabadi environmental activist
- GM Quader (born 1948), Bangladeshi politician, chairperson of Jatiya Party
- Manzur Quader, Bangladeshi politician, retired major of Bangladesh Army, former Member of Parliament
- Obaidul Quader (born 1950), Bangladeshi politician, General Secretary of Bangladesh Awami League
- Fazlul Quader Chowdhury (1919–1973), Bengali politician, speaker of the National Assembly of Pakistan from East Pakistan
- Giasuddin Quader Chowdhury, Bangladesh Nationalist Party politician,
- Salahuddin Quader Chowdhury (1949–2015), Bangladeshi politician, minister and six-term member of Jatiya Sangsad,
- Abdul Quader Molla (1948–2013), Bangladeshi Islamist leader, convicted of war crimes and sentenced to death
