= Rafiqul Islam (Jessore politician) =

Bangladeshi politician

- রফিকুল ইসলাম

Minister of State for Power, Energy and Mineral Resources
- In office 12 June 1996 – 1 October 2001

Member of Parliament for Jessore-2
- In office 27 February 1991 – 15 February 1996
- Preceded by: Mir Shahadatur Rahman
- Succeeded by: Quazi Munirul Huda
- In office 12 June 1996 – 1 October 2001
- Preceded by: Quazi Munirul Huda
- Succeeded by: Abu Syed Md. Shahadat Hussain

Personal details
- Born: Jessore District
- Party: Bangladesh Awami League

Rafiqul Islam is a politician of Jessore District of Bangladesh who was elected member of parliament for the Jessore-2 constituency in 1991 and June 1996. He was the minister of state for power, energy and mineral resources.

== Career ==
Rafiqul Islam was involved in the politics of the Chhatra League when he was a student. He fought in the war of liberation in 1971. Although he was nominated by the Awami League in the second parliamentary elections of 1979, he was defeated.

He was elected a member of parliament for the first time from Jessore-2 constituency on the nomination of Awami League in the 5th parliamentary election, in 1991. He was also elected a member of parliament from the same constituency on the nomination of Awami League in the 7th parliamentary election of June 1996. He served as the minister of state for power, energy and mineral resources in the first Sheikh Hasina cabinet.

He was defeated by the Bangladesh Jamaat-e-Islami candidate in the 8th national election, in 2001. In the 10th national parliamentary election, in 2014, he stood as an independent, but was defeated.
