= Mofiqul Hasan Tripti =

Bangladeshi politician (born 1960)

- মফিকুল হাসান তৃপ্তি
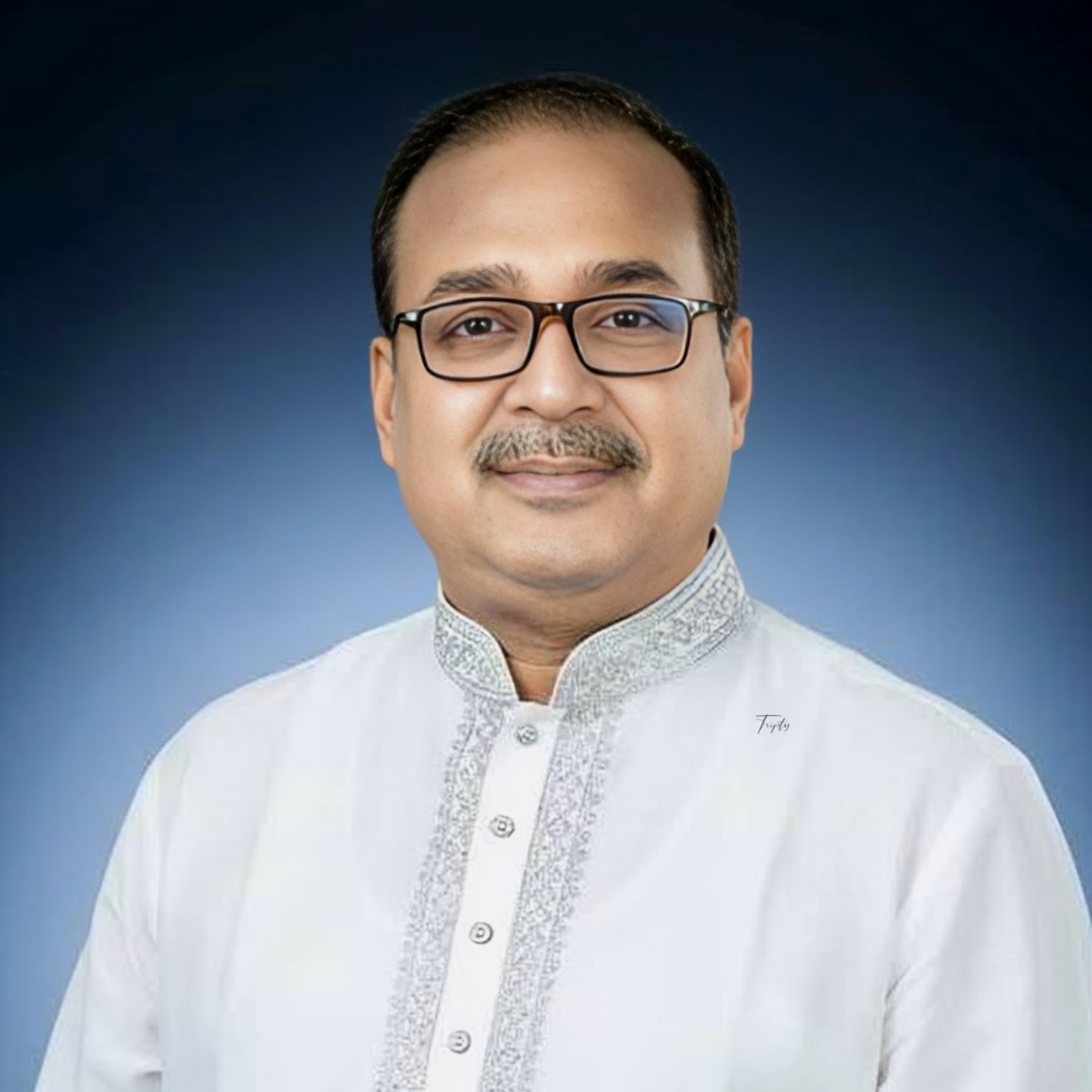

Member of Parliament
- In office February 1996 – June 1996
- Preceded by: Tabibar Rahman Sarder
- Succeeded by: Tabibar Rahman Sarder
- Constituency: Jessore-1

Personal details
- Born: 20 February 1960 (age 66) Sharsha upazila, Jessore, Bangladesh
- Party: Bangladesh Nationalist Party
- Spouse: Shukria Kamal
- Education: University of Dhaka

Mofiqul Hasan Tripti (born 20th february 1960) is a Bangladesh Nationalist Party politician and a former member of parliament from Jessore-1 constituency, former BNP Central Committee Office Secretary and a member of the BNP National Executive Committee.

== Early life ==
Mofiqul Hasan Tripti was born on 20 February 1960 in Baganchara, Sanatankathi village of Sharsha upazila of Jessore district. His father's name is Tofazzal Hossain and his mother's name is Rizia Khatun. Veteran politician and former late MP Ali Tareq is his uncle. Tripti completed his SSC from Baganchara United School in 1975, passed his HSC from Michael Madhusudan College in 1977. He obtained his Bachelors and Master's degree in soil science from University of Dhaka with honors.

== Career ==
Tripti started his political career with the Bangladesh Jatiotabadi Chatra Dal. As a student at the University of Dhaka he was actively involved in the student wing of the Bangladesh Nationalist Party. He lived in the historic Salimullah Muslim Hall of Dhaka University while as a student and also served as SM Hall's president and Dhaka University Chatra Dal committee's joint convener. He also served as Bangladesh Jatiotabadi Chatra Dal central committee's joint secretary and later joint vice-president. Afterwards, Tripti became a member of BNP's central national executive committee and served as its research and information secretary and later as its joint office secretary.

Tripti was the Office Secretary of Central Committee of the Bangladesh Nationalist Party during the second Khaleda cabinet. He was elected to parliament on 15 February 1996 from Jessore-1 as a candidate of Bangladesh Nationalist Party. He was nominated as a candidate for BNP from Jessore-1 in the 2018 national elections.

== Arrests ==
He was arrested in Jessore Airport on 23 May 2011 after carrying a licensed but loaded gun into the airport. Shafiullah, assistant police superintendent of Jessore, said the gun was licensed but Tripti broke the law by carrying a loaded gun in airport. The Bangladesh Members of Parliament Mohammad Khaledur Rahman Tito, Mostafa Faruk Mohammad, and Narayon Chandra Chanda were present in the airport.

On 9 August 2018, Tripti was arrested from his home in Banani, Dhaka over the 2006 murder of professor Aftab Ahmed, a vice-Chancellor of National University and a senior professor of political science at the University of Dhaka. On 23 September 2006, three unidentified youths shot Ahmed entering his Fuller Road residence in the university campus. CID’s Dhaka metropolitan (south) Special Superintendent of Police (SSP) Enamul Kabir confirmed to the Dhaka Tribune that Tripti was not an accused in the murder case yet and was taken into custody because his name had come up in the statement of one of the four suspects arrested in 2008. He received bail after serving two months in jail.

== Controversy ==
During the 2006-2008 Bangladesh political crisis, Tripti was one of many BNP mainstream and central National Executive Committee leaders who supported the then expelled secretary general Abdul Mannan Bhuiyan in party reforms. During Khaleda Zia's absence from the party due to her arrest, BNP's then new secretary general Khandaker Delwar Hossain expelled office secretary Tripti from the party. Delwar made Ruhul Kabir Rizvi acting office secretary who was the assistant office secretary before Tripti’s expulsion. Tripti later told the Daily Star, "According to the party constitution, only the chairperson can expel a member of the party's national executive committee." He also added that no one has the right to cancel his membership from the party except the chairperson.

Later, Tripti's expulsion order was withdrawn by incumbent secretary general Mirza Fakhrul Islam Alamgir on 19 November 2017.

== Family ==
Tripti is married to Shukria Kamal, a fellow alumni of the University of Dhaka. She currently works as a deputy controller in Sher-e-Bangla Agricultural University (SAU). The couple have two sons.
