= Hyderabad Literary Festival =

Annual literary festival in India

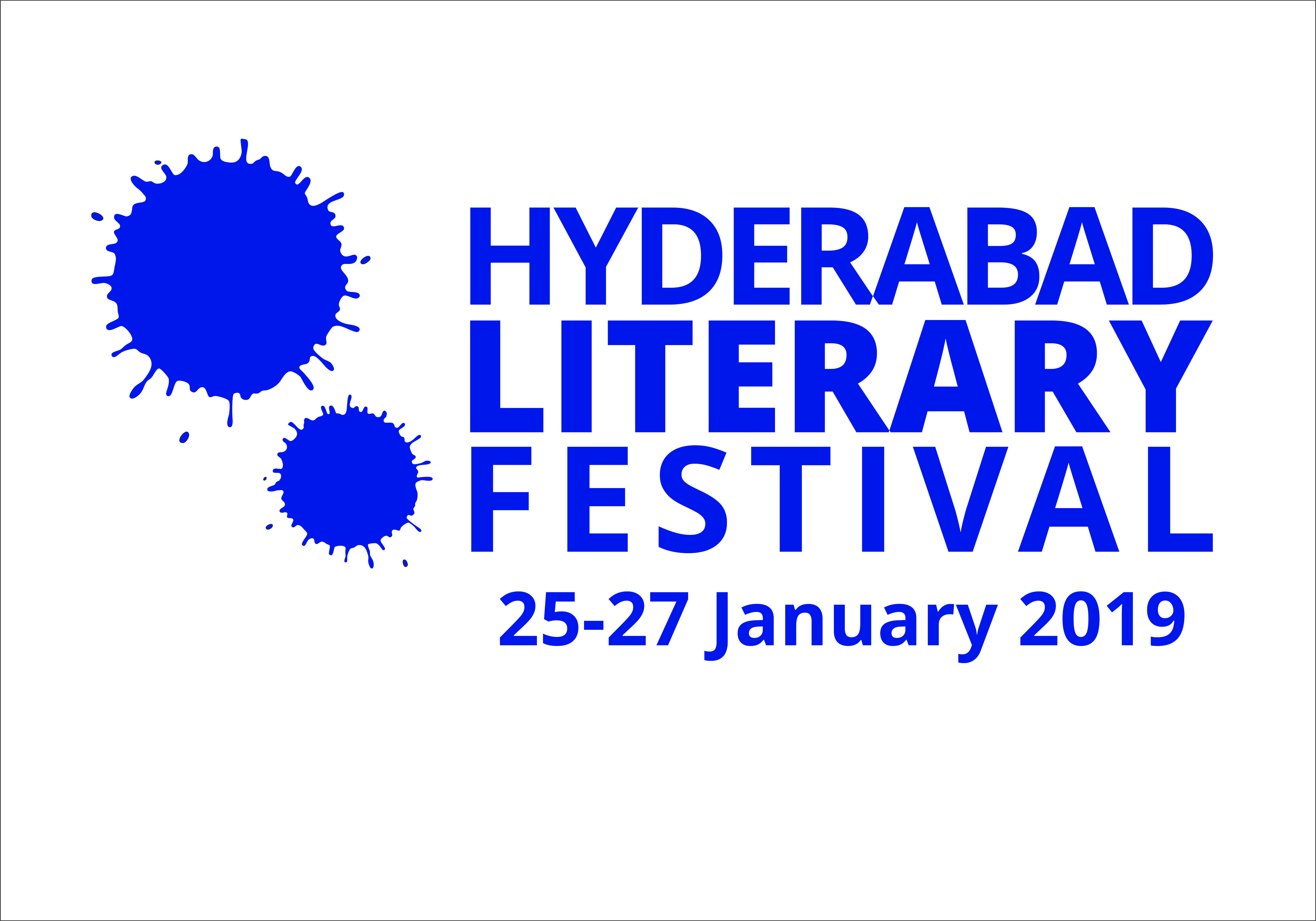
- Genre: Literary festival
- Dates: 24–26 January 2025
- Locations: Hyderabad, India
- Years active: 2010 - present
- Patrons: Karvy Group, Telangana Tourism | Hyderabad Literary Trust
- Website: www.hydlitfest.org

Hyderabad Literary Festival or HLF is a literary festival held in Hyderabad, Telangana, India. It is a 3-day annual event that celebrates creativity in all its forms. Every year has a guest nation, and an Indian language in focus.

The Festival has emerged as an important event in the cultural calendar of the country representing, as it does, the rich and cosmopolitan ethos of the twin cities of Hyderabad and Secunderabad, as well as the vibrant culture of the modern Cyberabad. HLF is a Festival for All. Its programme includes conversations with authors, readings, discussion panels, workshops, book launches, cultural programmes, and events for college students and school children.

Hyderabad Literary Festival is organized by Hyderabad Literary Trust in association with the Department of Tourism, Government of Telangana, and with the support of several academic, literary, cultural organizations and publishing houses.

== 2010 Festival ==
The festival started in 2010 and while the inaugural day's events were held at Hotel Green Park, the rest was held at Osmania University Centre for International Programmes (OUCIP). Muse India, the leading literary web-journal of the country, and OUCIP, the international face of Osmania University, jointly organized HLF 2010. Held from 10 to 12 December 2010, HLF played host to nearly 100 writers from across India, writing in various Indian languages and English. Never before had the Twin Cities seen an assemblage of such a large and diverse group of writers at a single event, reading from their work and sharing their insights into the creative process.

Participating poets included Padma Bhushan Prof Shiv K. Kumar, the Doyen among Indian English Poets, the eminent poet Mr Keki Daruwalla, Prof Udaya Narayana Singh, Pro-VC, Viswa-Bharati, Santiniketan, Prof K. Satchidanandan, Former Secretary, Sahitya Akademi and eminent Malayalam Poet, Ms Mamang Dai, former Civil Servant and noted Writer from North-East India, Dr Shanta Acharya, London-based poet and scholar, earlier with the London Business School, Mr Hemant Divate, the noted Marathi poet and Editor, Abhidhanantar, Dr Dileep Jhaveri, the Eminent Gujarati poet, K Siva Reddy, the leading Telugu poet, Prof Laksmisree Banerjee, Vice Chancellor, Kolhan University, Jharkhand, Prof Hoshang Merchant, the well-known Hyderabad-based poet, Mr T P Rajeevan, Malayalam poet, editor and publisher and Dr Sukrita Paul Kumar, noted Urdu and Hindi scholar and poet.

The Festival was inaugurated on 10 December 2010 at Green Park Hotel, Greenlands, Hyderabad. Mr Keki Daruwalla, the Distinguished poet, delivered the Keynote Address. The Literary sessions were held at OUCIP along with a special Cultural Evening at the famous heritage site, Taramati Baradari, Golkonda.

== 2012 Festival ==
The festival was held from 16 to 18 January 2012 at the impressive Taramati Baradari cultural complex located in the historic Golkonda area. It was organized by Muse India, the highly acclaimed Hyderabad-based literary eJournal, in partnership with the Department of Tourism, Government of AP and several cultural organizations of the city.

Special sessions were held in Telugu and Urdu-Hindi literatures. Some of the best writers in Telugu, Urdu and Hindi based in Hyderabad were featured in sessions dedicated to these languages. There was a performance of Ashthavadhanam, a genre of Telugu literature that demands exceptional scholarship, skills in composing poetry, memory power, and presence of mind. There was also an Urdu Mushaira session, a form popular among the people of Hyderabad.

Germany was the 'Featured Nation' at HLF-2012, with the participation of a few senior German writers and a Music band. Muse India also carried a special feature on Contemporary German Literature in its Jan-Feb 2012 Issue to coincide with the festival.

Muse India instituted 2 awards to be given at HLF - The Young Writer Award and The Translation Award. For the 2011 awards, Muse India received an overwhelming response with 150 entries. National level Juries nominated the following writers/books (alphabetical order) for the Awards that were announced at HLF 2012:

Nominations for the Translation Award 2011

1. Jai Ratan's translation of Kamleshwar's 'Not Flowers of Henna', Katha, 2007
2. Naresh Jain's translation of Omprakash Valmiki's 'Amma and Other Stories', Manohar, 2008
3. Ranjit Hoskote's translation of 'I, Lalla, The Poems of Lal Ded', Penguin. 2011.

Nominations for the Young Writer Award 2011 for Poetry

1. Amrita V Nair's 'Yours Affectionately', Writers Workshop, 2009
2. Anindita Sengupta's 'City of Water', Sahitya Akademi, 2010
3. Semeen Ali's 'Rose & Ashes', Writers Workshop, 2009.

Guests of Honour for HLF 2012 were C. Narayana Reddy, Gulzar, and Pavan K. Varma. Foreign Writers included Christopher Kloeble, Germany, Constance Borde, France, Sheila Malovany-Chevallier, France, and Urs Widmer, Switzerland.

== 2013 Festival ==
In 2013 the 3-day Hyderabad Literary Festival was very successfully held from 18 to 20 January 2013 on the campus of Maulana Azad National Urdu University (MANUU), Gachibowli, Hyderabad. It drew participation of around 125 writers and artistes from all over India and several other countries. It was inaugurated on 18 Jan 2013 by Mr E S L Narasimhan, Honorable Governor of State. The keynote was delivered by Dr Sitakant Mahapatra, the Jnanpith and Padma Vibhushan awardee.

HLF2013 was organized by Muse India: the literary ejournal in collaboration with the State Government Department of Tourism, and with the support of several academic, literary, cultural organizations and publishing houses. The Guest Nation of HLF 2013 was France. A new feature that was being introduced at HLF 2013, was a special focus on the literature and culture of one Indian language at each edition of the Festival. Telugu became the first language in focus at HLF 2013.

== 2014 Festival ==
HLF's fourth edition was held right in the heart of the city on Literary Street, Road no. 8, Banjara Hills. The festival was a grand success with an estimated approximately 6,500 footfall over the three days of the festival from 24 to 26 January 2014. This year's guest nation was Ireland and H.E. Feilim McLaughlin, Ambassador of Ireland to India, graced the occasion as Guest of Honour. The Indian language in focus was Hindi, and several Hindi authors including Sahitya Academi award-winner Mridula Garg were present.

The inauguration took place on the 24 January 2014 at Ashiana and the festival was presented by Smt. Chandana Khan, IAS Special Chief Secretary, Telangana Tourism, and Hon. Chairman of Hyderabad Literary Festival. Mahesh Dattani, well known playwright in English, actor and director from India, also the first playwright in English to be awarded the Sahitya Akademi award, was the Chief Guest. The inauguration ceremony culminated in a Literary Walk or LitWalk, that threw open the Literary Street and brought all the festival venues to life!

The festival took place in various venues off Literary Street : Ashiana, Kalpa School, Saptaprni, Kalakriti Art Gallery and Lamakaan. The programme left one spoilt for choice with a packed schedule including literary sessions, several workshops that catered to all ages, competitions for children and youth, as well as evening cultural events on all three days. The highlight of the cultural programme was the performance at the historical location of Taramati Baradari, by Irish groups "Mouth on Fire" and "Guthanna Binne Síoraí" that brought to life the work of Nobel Laureate Samuel Beckett and the poetry of Irish Nobel Laureates Seamus Heaney and W. B. Yeats.

The festival had more than a hundred writers, poets, artists, speakers and panelists present.

== 2015 Festival ==
The fifth edition of the Hyderabad Literary Festival 2015 was held from 23 to 26 January 2015. The chief guest for the HLF 2015 was a renowned poet and literary figure, Javed Akhtar. The inaugural function was organised at Park Hyatt Hotel, Banjara Hills.

== 2016 Festival ==
The sixth edition of the Hyderabad Literary Festival 2016 was held from 7–10 January 2016.

== 2017 Festival ==
In the series of literary festivals that began in 2010, the 2017 festival was held at the Hyderabad Public School.

== 2018 Festival ==
In 2018, the festival was held at Hyderabad Public School, Begumpet from 26th through 28 January. Rock walks were held alongside by the Society to Save Rocks led by Frauke Quader.

== 2019 Festival ==
The 2019 literary festival was again held in the premises of Hyderabad Public School, Begumpet from 25th through 27 January 2019. China was the guest nation and Gujarati language was the one in focus, with title sponsor as Karvy. A rockumentary by the Society to Save Rocks was also scheduled for screening on 27 January, during the festival.

== 2020 Festival ==
In 2020, the Hyderabad Literary Festival took place from the 24th to the 26th of January. The event was held at Vidyaranya High School in Saifabad.

== 2023 Festival ==
The 2023 literary festival was again held in the premises of Vidyaranya High School, from 27th through 29 January 2023. Germany was the guest nation and Konkani language was the one in focus. Speakers included Damodar Mauzo, Palagummi Sainath.

== 2024 Festival ==
14th edition was held between January 26–28 at Sattva Knowledge City in Hitech City, registering an attendance of over 60,000 individuals over the course of three days.

== 2025 Festival ==
15th edition was held between January 24–26 at Sattva Knowledge City, HITEC City. The guest nation for the HLF 2025 was Lithuania and the Indian language in focus was Sindhi.

== 2026 Festival ==
16th edition was held between January 24–26 at Sattva Knowledge City, HITEC City. Kashmir was the region in focus for the HLF 2026, with its art, music, cinema and literature taking the spotlight.
