= Tahmina Khan Dolly =

Bangladeshi politician

Tahmina Khan Dolly is a Bangladesh Nationalist Party politician and the first woman to be appointed high commissioner of Bangladesh to Sri Lanka. She is a former advisor to Bangladesh Nationalist Party chairperson and former Prime Minister Khaleda Zia.

== Biography ==
Dolly was married to Gias Ahmed Khan, an officer of the Bangladesh Army. They had two sons, Jawad Ahmed Khan (died 8 January 2001) and Fuad.

Dolly was appointed High Commissioner of Bangladesh to Sri Lanka by President Ziaur Rahman of the Bangladesh Nationalist Party. The first Bangladeshi woman to be appointed ambassador. Mahmuda Huq Chowdhury and Shelley Zaman were the second and third women to be appointed ambassadors by the government of Bangladesh. She served from 1980 to 1981.

In 2009, Dolly was a member of the advisory Council for Bangladesh Nationalist Party Chairperson Khaleda Zia. She wasn't active in politics and was suffering from health issues.
