= Shelley Zaman =

Bangladeshi diplomat

- শেলি জামান

Ambassador of Bangladesh to Spain
- In office 15 July 1999 – 30 November 2001
- Preceded by: M. Mizanur Rahman
- Succeeded by: Shahed Akhter

Shelley Zaman is the former ambassador of Bangladesh to Spain, the third woman to be appointed an ambassador of Bangladesh. She is cousin of former Prime Minister Sheikh Hasina.

== Biography ==
After the assassination of Sheikh Mujibur Rahman, Sheikh Hasina created the Netherlands Awami League unit with Zaman as president and Shamim Haque as the general secretary.

Zaman served as the president of the Awami League in the Netherlands for 18 years. She attended the conference of all-European BAKSAL on 10 May 1979 in Stockholm, Sweden. In January 1999, she was appointed ambassador of Bangladesh to Spain by the Awami League government. She was the third Bangladeshi woman to serve as ambassador after Tahmina Khan Dolly and Mahmuda Huq Chowdhury. She served till 30 November 2002 and was replaced by Shahed Akther.

In June 2008, Zaman met former Prime Minister Sheikh Hasina with her mother Khodeja Khanom, who is an aunt of Sheikh Hasina, in the special cell holding Hasina after she received permission to leave Bangladesh for medical treatment.
