= Maulana Nurunnabi Samdani =

Bangladeshi politician

Member of Bangladesh Parliament
- In office 1979–1986
- Preceded by: Nur-e-Alam Siddiqui
- Succeeded by: Maqbool Hossain

Personal details
- Party: Islamic Democratic League

Maulana Nurunnabi Samdani is an Islamic Democratic League politician and a former member of parliament for Jessore-2.

== Career ==
Samdani was elected to parliament from Jessore-2 as an Islamic Democratic League candidate in 1979.
