= Md. Golam Mustafa =

Bangladeshi politician

Member of Bangladesh Parliament
- In office 1979–1982
- Preceded by: Kazi Khademul Islam
- Succeeded by: Noor Hussain

Personal details
- Party: Jatiya Samajtantrik Dal

Md. Golam Mustafa is a Jatiya Samajtantrik Dal politician and a former member of parliament for Jessore-1.

== Career ==
Mustafa was elected to parliament from Jessore-1 as a Jatiya Samajtantrik Dal candidate in 1979. In 1991, he contested the election from Jhenaidah-1.
