= Abdul Momin Chowdhury =

Bangladeshi historian and academic (1940–2024)

- আবদুল মমিন চৌধুরী

Vice Chancellor

National University of Bangladesh
- In office 2001–2003
- Preceded by: Durgadas Bhattacharjee
- Succeeded by: Aftab Ahmad

Vice Chancellor

Primeasia University, Bangladesh
- In office 2003–2005

President

Asiatic Society of Bangladesh
- In office 2000–2003
- Preceded by: M Harunur Rashid
- Succeeded by: Emajuddin Ahamed

Personal details
- Born: 22 January 1940
- Died: 9 February 2024 (aged 84) Lalmatia, Dhaka, Bangladesh
- Education: Dhaka College; University of Dhaka; University of London
- Occupation: Historian, academic, university administrator

Abdul Momin Chowdhury (22 January 1940 – 9 February 2024) was a Bangladeshi historian and academic. He was the Vice-chancellor of the National University of Bangladesh and Primeasia University, Bangladesh. He also served as the President of the Bangladesh History Association and the Asiatic Society of Bangladesh.

== Background ==
Chowdhury was born to Abdul Wadud Chowdhury and Shirin Begum in 1940. He passed Matriculation from Armanitola Government High School, Dhaka in 1954 and I.A. from Dhaka College, Dhaka in 1956. He completed a B.A. (Honours) and an M.A. in history in 1959 and 1960 respectively from the University of Dhaka. He achieved a Ph.D. from the School of Oriental and African Studies (SOAS), University of London in 1965. He did post-doctoral research at SOAS from 1975 to 1976 as a Commonwealth Fellow. He spent an academic year (2013–2014) at Vanderbilt University, Nashville, Tennessee, U.S., as a visiting scholar with a Senior Fulbright Fellowship.

Chowdhury died on 9 February 2024, at the age of 84.

== Career ==
Chowdhury started his teaching career as a lecturer of history at the University of Dhaka in 1961. He became a professor in 1978 and served there until 2013. In a long professional career, he was the Chairman of the Department of History, Librarian (in addition to teaching), Dean of the Faculty of Arts, Member of the Syndicate and Senate at the University of Dhaka.

Chowdhury was associated with various learned professional organizations. He served as the General Secretary and President of the Bangladesh History Association. He was President of the Asiatic Society of Bangladesh (ASB), as well. He was a respected Fellow of that society.

Chowdhury served as the vice-chancellor of the National University of Bangladesh and Primeasia University, Bangladesh.

== Works ==
Chowdhury wrote a number of books and published more than 40 research articles in national and international journals. One of his widely acclaimed books is Dynastic History of Bengal (750-1200 A.D.), Asiatic Society of Pakistan, Dacca, 1967.
