= Doreen Group =

Diversified conglomerate based in Dhaka, Bangladesh

- Formation: 1979
- Headquarters: Dhaka, Bangladesh
- Region served: Bangladesh
- Official language: Bengali
- Website: doreen.com

Doreen Group (Bengali: ডোরিন গ্রুপ) is a Bangladeshi diversified conglomerate based in Dhaka. Nur-E-Alam Siddique is chairperson of the group. Parveen Alam Siddique is the senior vice chairperson. Tahzeeb Alam Siddique is the managing director and Tanzeer Alam Siddique is the vice-chairperson.

== History ==
Doreen Group was founded by Nur-E-Alam Siddique, member of the first parliament of Bangladesh from Jessore-2.

Doreen Group founded Doreen Capital Management in 1975.

Doreen Group founded M.N. Nabi Textiles Limited in 1985.

Doreen Group founded Eastern Cement in 1999.

On 20 August 2007, Doreen Group founded Doreen Power Generations and Systems Limited.

In May 2008, National Credit and Commerce Bank announced that it will fund three power plants of Doreen Power Generations and Systems Limited. On 28 December 2008, it opened a 22-megawatt power plant in Tangail District.

Doreen Tower was inaugurated in 2008. The Daily Star reported on 10 December 2011 that Doreen Tower of Doreen Group in Gulshan-2 was built in violation of rules and regulations. It violated its building permit by building it 150 feet higher than the permit allowed. Doreen Tower is 27 storeys high and has only one staircase and lift.

Doreen Group established VRL Studio in 2016. In April 2016, offloaded shares of Doreen Power Generations and Systems on the Dhaka Stock Exchange and raised 580 million taka. In September 2016, Bangladesh Power Development Board provided permission to Doreen power plant in Manikganj District.

Doreen Group founded Imperial Automobiles in 2017. In April 2017, the Government of Bangladesh provided permission to Doreen Power Generation & Systems and Doreen Power House & Tech to build a 115MW rental power plant in Chandpur District. City Bank limited financed the construction of 53.9-megawatt power plant in Munshiganj District with US$26 million on 26 December 2017.

On 16 August 2018, Bangladesh Securities and Exchange Commission fined seven Doreen Power staff members for insider trading on Dhaka Stock Exchange.

In May 2020, garments workers of factories in Savar owned by Doreen Group protested demanding full payment of their wages. They had been paid half wages due to the COVID-19 pandemic in Bangladesh according to management.

In January 2021, Doreen Power was one of few energy companies to see a rise in income amids the COVID-19 pandemic in Bangladesh.

== Businesses ==
- Eastern Cement Industries Limited
- Doreen Developments
- Doreen Hotels & Resorts
- The Flair restaurant
- Doreen Tower
- Doreen Power Generations and Systems Limited
- Doreen Power House & Tech
- Dhaka Northern Power Generations Limited
- Chandpur Power Generations Limited
- Doreen Engineering and Construction Limited
- Doreen Capital Management
- Doreen Management Services
- Imperial Automobiles
- M.N. Nabi Textiles Limited
- Doreen garment Limited (Doreen Apparels Limited, N Neher Textile Limited, and SOB Apparels Limited.)
- AVALON
- VRL Studio
