= Tufail Karim Haider =

Diplomat and former High Commissioner of Bangladesh to India

- তুফায়েল করিম হায়দার

High Commissioner of Bangladesh to India
- In office 31 January 2002 – 15 October 2003
- Preceded by: Mostafa Faruk Mohammad
- Succeeded by: Hemayet Uddin

Ambassador of Bangladesh to Iran
- In office 11 October 1998 – 23 January 2002
- Succeeded by: Abdullah Al Hasan

Ambassador of Bangladesh to France
- In office 18 December 1996 – 3 October 1998
- Preceded by: K.M. Shehabuddin
- Succeeded by: Syed Muazzem Ali

Ambassador of Bangladesh to Egypt
- In office 29 April 1993 – 11 December 1996
- Preceded by: Nurun Nabi Chowdhury
- Succeeded by: M. Ruhul Amin

Personal details
- Education: University of Dhaka

Tufail Karim Haider, also known as Tufail K. Haider, is a diplomat and former High Commissioner of Bangladesh to India and an ambassador to France.

== Early life ==
Haider completed his master's degree in political science from the University of Dhaka in 1966.

== Career ==
Haider joined the Pakistan Foreign Service in 1968.

Hossain was the third secretary of the Bangladesh Embassy in Germany and based in Bad Godesberg, Bonn.

From 18 December 1996 to 3 October 1998, Haider served as the Ambassador of Bangladesh to France. He replaced K.M. Shehabuddin in 1996 and was replaced by Syed Muazzem Ali in 1998. He was also the Permanent Delegation to UNESCO in Paris.

From 11 October 1998 to 23 January 2002, Haider served as the first Ambassador of Bangladesh to Iran. He was replaced by Abdullah Al Hasan.

In January 2002, Haider was appointed the High Commissioner of Bangladesh to India replacing Mostafa Faruque Mohammad. As High Commissioner, he rejected Indian allegations of Bangladesh harboring terrorists in November 2002. During his term in office there was a border dispute between India and Bangladesh in which 213 nomads were stuck in the no-man's-land in Bangladesh-India border. This increased tensions at the border between the two countries. Meera Shankar, official of the Ministry of External Affairs, requested Haider to take back the nomads. Bangladesh referred to those stranded as Bengali speaking Muslim Indians. He was part of a delegation led by Saifur Rahman, Finance Minister of Bangladesh, that met with Jaswant Singh, Finance Minister of India.

Haider is the director of GSP Investments Limited. He was an executive member of Gulshan Society from 2012 to 2014. He was a friend of noted artist Kalidas Karmakar. He is a member of the Association of Former Ambassadors. In 2017, he served as an independent director of LafargeHolcim Bangladesh Limited, a subsidiary of Holcim Group. He is a member of Dhaka University Alumni Association.

== Personal life ==
Haider is married to Raana Haider.
