= Wakil Ahmed =

Bangladeshi academic

- ওয়াকিল আহমদ

Vice-chancellor of Bangladesh National University
- In office 21 July 2005 – 26 December 2007
- Preceded by: Aftab Ahmed
- Succeeded by: Syed Rashedul Hasan (in-charge)

President of Bangla Academy
- In office 12 February 2002 – 11 February 2006
- Preceded by: Anisuzzaman
- Succeeded by: M. Harunur Rashid

Personal details
- Born: 5 April 1941 (age 85) Murshidabad, Bengal Province, British India
- Education: University of Dhaka; University of Calcutta
- Occupation: Academic
- Awards: Ekushey Padak

Wakil Ahmed (born 5 April 1941) is a Bangladeshi academic who served as the vice-chancellor of Bangladesh National University from July 2005 until December 2007. He is the former president of the Bangla Academy and the Asiatic Society of Bangladesh. He was awarded Ekushey Padak in 2004 by the Government of Bangladesh for his research contribution.

== Career ==
Ahmed was appointed the vice-chancellor of Bangladesh National University in July 2005. In December 2007, he was removed from the office.

As of 2010, Ahmed served as a supernumerary professor of the Department of Bangla at the University of Dhaka.
