= Aftab Ahmed (academic) =

Bangladeshi academic (1949–2006)

- আফতাব আহমাদ

Vice-Chancellor of National University of Bangladesh
- In office 5 July 2003 – 20 July 2005
- Preceded by: Abdul Momin Chowdhury
- Succeeded by: Wakil Ahmed

Personal details
- Born: 31 December 1949 Noakhali, East Bengal, Dominion of Pakistan
- Died: 26 September 2006 (aged 56) Dhaka, Bangladesh
- Education: University of Dhaka; University of London

Aftab Ahmed (31 December 1949 – 26 September 2006) was a Bangladeshi academic. He served as the 5th vice-chancellor of National University of Bangladesh. On 23 September 2006, Ahmed was assassinated at his Dhaka residence. Mofiqul Hasan Tripti, an influential politician of the Bangladesh Nationalist Party, was arrested for the crime in August 2018.

== Early life ==
Ahmed was born at Mirzanagar of Begumganj Upazila in Noakhali District. He passed the SSC and HSC exams in 1966 and 1968 respectively. He stood first class first in BA (honours) and master's in political science from the University of Dhaka in 1971 and 1972 respectively. He earned his PhD from the University of London in 1983.

== Career ==
Ahmed joined the political science department of the University of Chittagong in 1977 as a lecturer and was promoted to assistant professor in 1981 and associate professor in 1984. He joined the University of Dhaka as a professor of political science department in 1995. He served as the vice-chancellor of National University of Bangladesh from July 2003 until July 2005. He was relieved of the position before completing the full 4-year tenure. He then served as a senior professor of political science at the University of Dhaka.

== Death ==
On 23 September 2006, three gunmen stormed Ahmed's residence at the University of Dhaka campus and shot him with several bullets. He was admitted to the Samorita Hospital and then later to the Combined Military Hospital (CMH). Three days later, Ahmed died following a cardiac arrest resulting from blood clots. In 2008, one of the four suspected accused in the murder case gave his confessional statement before a court and disclosed the name of Bangladesh Nationalist Party Member of Parliament Mofiqul Hasan Tripti in connection with the involvement in the murder. A Dhaka court rejected his bail and ordered him sent to jail on the 10-day remand prayer submitted by the Criminal Investigation Department inspector.

== Personal life ==
Ahmed was married to Noorjahan Aftab.
