= Mojo (soft drink) =

Carbonated soft drink

- Type: Cola
- Manufacturer: Akij Group
- Distributor: Akij Food & Beverage Limited (AFBL)
- Origin: Bangladesh, Kawran Bazar, Dhaka
- Introduced: 2006; 20 years ago
- Color: Caramel E-150d
- Variants: Naga Mojo
- Related products: Pepsi; RC Cola; Afri-Cola; Postobón; Inca Kola; Kola Real; Cavan Cola; Est Cola
- Website: akijfood.com

Mojo is a cola flavored carbonated soft drink manufactured by the Akij Food and Beverage Limited (AFBL), a subsidiary of Akij Group which was launched on 14 April 2006. The brand was named after the Bengali word for "fun" (Moja). In late 2023 and 2024, the brand experienced an increase in sales during consumer boycotts of brands affiliated with Israel in support of Palestine in Gaza–Israel conflict. Mojo also saw growth as a result of campaign which stated for every one Bangladeshi taka one Bangladeshi taka from every purchase of the product would go to Palestine. At its peak after donation campaign in partnership with the Palestinian Embassy and the World Food Programme, the product faced product shortage because of high sales.

== History ==
The brand was launched in 14 April 2006 by Akij Group's sister project Akij Food & Beverage Limited (AFBL). The name of the product was inspired by the word “Moja” which mean fun in Bengali language and campaigned by using jingles like “Asmane Pakha Melo” an advertisement title “Antor is On”.

After the Gaza war, many Muslims in Bangladesh began boycotting the products of various companies, including Coca-Cola, due to its affiliations with Israel, in which Coca-Cola's sale was decreased by 60%. During the same period, Mojo run a donation campaign where every 1 Bangladeshi taka would go to the Palestine donation fund. This campaign led to the significant rise in sales recording the highest sale in the brand's history. The significant rise in demand leads to them facing product shortages.

On 2 January 2024, Sheikh Shamim Uddin, chairman of Akij Group, presented a cheque of $41,821 to the Palestinian ambassador. Through the World Food Programme (WFP), Akij Welfare Trust and Mojo have donated Tk 61,750,000 or US$516,493 to Gaza and Tk 15,000,000 to Palestine Embassy as of June 2024.

== Award ==
Mojo has been recognized by Bangladesh Brand Forum as the "number one beverage brand in Bangladesh" in the "Best Brand Award 2024".

== Other flavors ==
- Naga Mojo
