= Shahed Akhter =

Bangladeshi diplomat

- শাহেদ আখতার

Ambassador of Bangladesh to Thailand
- In office 25 December 2003 – 13 August 2007
- Preceded by: Hemayet Uddin
- Succeeded by: Mustafa Kamal

Ambassador of Bangladesh to Spain
- In office 5 February 2002 – 16 December 2003
- Preceded by: Shelley Zaman
- Succeeded by: Anwar Ul Alam Shaheed

Shahed Akhter is a former Bangladeshi diplomat. He served as an ambassador of Bangladesh to Thailand and Spain.

== Career ==
Akhter served as Ambassador to Spain, Thailand, and Cambodia, Permanent Representative to UN-ESCAP and WTO, Deputy High Commissioner in the UK and Malaysia, and held other positions in New York, Bangkok, London, Spain, and Kuala Lumpur.

Before retirement, Akhter served as a principal of the Bangladesh Foreign Service Academy during 2008-2009.

Akhter was part of the international observer group for Ghana’s 2013 elections.
