= Narendra Luther =

Indian writer (1932–2021)

IAS Narendra Luther

Former Chief Secretary of undivided Andhra Pradesh

Personal details
- Born: 23 March 1932 Hoshiarpur, Punjab, India
- Died: 19 January 2021 (aged 88) Hyderabad, Telangana
- Education: B. A. (Panjab), M. A. (Panjab)
- Alma mater: Government College, Hoshiarpur
- Occupation: IAS officer (1955 batch)
- Awards: Golden Astor
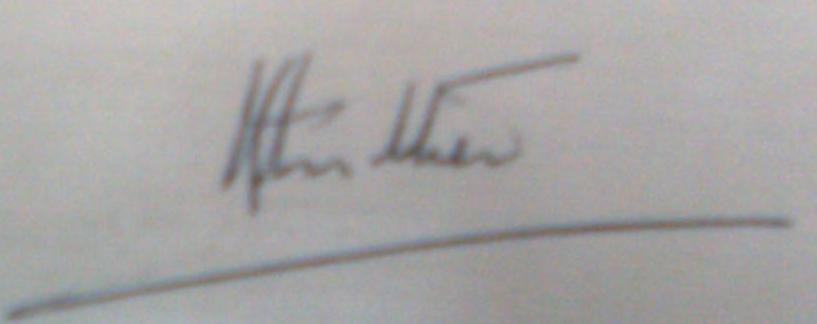
- Signature
- Website: narendraluther.in

Narendra Luther (23 March 1932 – 19 January 2021) was a poet, writer, historian, civil servant, and columnist. He died on the morning of Tuesday, 19 January 2021 in Hyderabad, Telangana State India. He worked on the history and culture of erstwhile Hyderabad state and its rulers. He was President of the Society to Save Rocks, Hyderabad, India.

Noted Academic, Sachidananda Mohanty writes,

(Adapted) Narendra Luther was an acknowledged expert on the history and culture of Hyderabad. He had written exclusively on this subject and authored many books. He had won several awards for his work in Urdu. Some of his books and articles had been translated into a number of Indian and foreign languages. He had also produced many acclaimed documentaries including India's first full-length animation film on the love story of the founder of Hyderabad. His documentary won two Golden Astor awards.

The then Chief Minister of Telangana, Sri K. Chandrashekar Rao recalled the contribution of Narendra Luther on his death and expressed his condolences,

(Adapted) Narendra Luther was a person who worked on the history and culture of erstwhile Hyderabad State and its rulers and also as the President of the Society to Save Rocks, Hyderabad. He served as a civil servant working in various capacities in the erstwhile Andhra Pradesh government.

Honorary titles
| Preceded by Laxma Goud | President, Society to Save Rocks; 1997-2021 | Succeeded by Prof. Fatima Ali Khan |

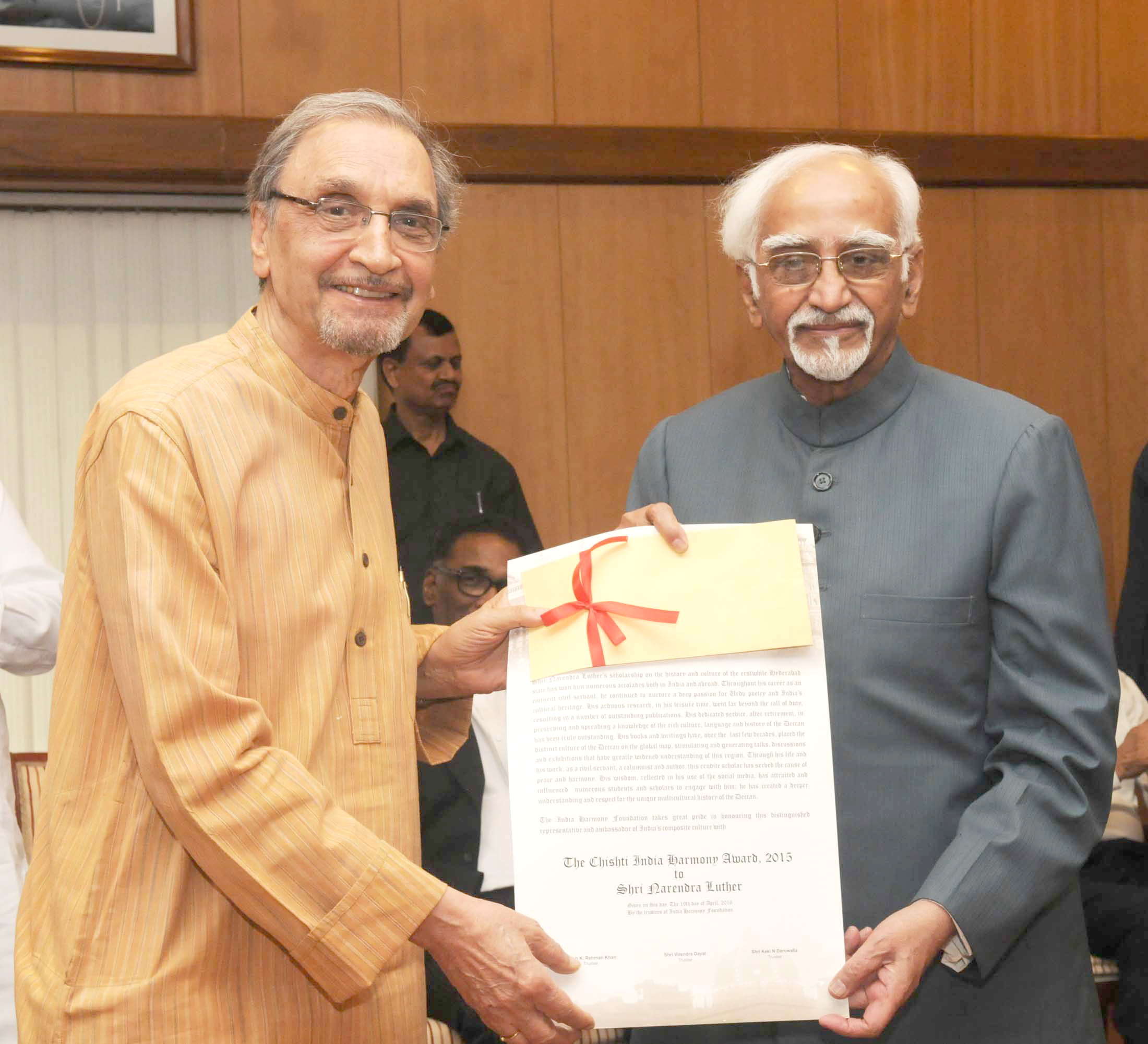
The Vice President, Shri M. Hamid Ansari giving away the Chisti India Harmony Award 2015 to Shri Narendra Luther, Historian and former Bureaucrat, in New Delhi on April 19, 2016

== Books ==
Some of the books authored by Narendra Luther include the following:

- Hyderabad: A Biography
- The Rockitecture of Andhra Pradesh
- Raja Deen Dayal: Prince of Photographers
- Prince;Poet;Lover;Builder: Mohd. Quli Qutb Shah - The founder of Hyderabad
- Lashkar The Story of Secunderabad
- A Bonsai Tree An Autobiography
- Hyderabad Memoirs of a City
- The Family Saga A Novel Set in the Time of Partition
- Legend[o]tes of Hyderabad
