= Jessore-2 =

Constituency of Bangladesh's Jatiya Sangsad

Coordinates: 23.1058°N 89.1038°E

- Constituency for the Jatiya Sangsad
- District: Jessore District
- Division: Khulna Division
- Electorate: 405,871 (2018)

Current constituency
- Created: 1973
- Party: Bangladesh Jamaat-e-Islami
- Member of Parliament: Dr. Mosleh Uddin Farid
- ← 85 Jessore-1 87 Jessore-3 →

Jessore-2 is a constituency represented in the Jatiya Sangsad (National Parliament) of Bangladesh.

== Boundaries ==
The constituency encompasses Chaugachha and Jhikargachha upazilas.

== History ==
The constituency was created for the first general elections in newly independent Bangladesh, held in 1973.

== Members of Parliament ==
Election	Member	Party
1973	Nur-e-Alam Siddiqui	Awami League
1979	Maulana Nurunnabi Samdani	Islamic Democratic League
Major Boundary Changes
1986	Maqbool Hossain	Jamaat-e-Islami
1988	Mir Shahadatur Rahman	Jatiya Party
1991	Rafiqul Islam	Awami League
Feb 1996	Quazi Munirul Huda	BNP
Jun 1996	Rafiqul Islam	Awami League
2001	Abu Syed Md. Shahadat Hussain	Jamaat-e-Islami
2008	Mostafa Faruk Mohammad	Awami League
2014	Mohammad Monirul Islam	Awami League
2018	Nasir Uddin	Awami League
2024	Md Towhiduzzaman	Awami League
2026	Mohammad Moslehuddin Farid	Bangladesh Jamaat-e-Islami

== Elections ==
=== Elections in the 2010s ===
General Election 2014: Jessore-2
Party	Candidate	Votes	%	±%
AL	Mohammad Monirul Islam	91,912	64.7	+11.6
Independent	Rafiqul Islam	49,339	34.7	N/A
Jatiya Party (M)	BM Selim Reza	883	0.6	N/A
Majority		42,573	30.0	+22.6
Turnout		142,134	39.5	−54.2
AL hold				

=== Elections in the 2000s ===
General Election 2008: Jessore-2
Party	Candidate	Votes	%	±%
AL	Mostafa Faruk Mohammad	154,875	53.1	+7.2
Jamaat	Abu Sayeed Md. Shahadat Hussain	133,244	45.7	N/A
IAB	Md. Asaduzzaman	2,519	0.9	N/A
NAP	A. T. M. Enamul Haque	763	0.3	N/A
BDB	BM Selim Reza	292	0.1	N/A
Majority		21,631	7.4	+1.0
Turnout		291,693	93.7	+4.0
AL gain from Jamaat				

General Election 2001: Jessore-2
Party	Candidate	Votes	%	±%
Jamaat	Abu Syed Md. Shahadat Hussain	137,717	52.3	+28.5
AL	Rafiqul Islam	120,899	45.9	+3.2
Independent	Atiur Rahman	2,102	0.8	N/A
IJOF	BM Selim Reza	2,095	0.8	N/A
CPB	Abul Hossain	469	0.2	N/A
Independent	Rezaul Islam	229	0.1	N/A
Independent	Md. Jahidul Islam	48	0.0	N/A
Majority		16,818	6.4	−7.6
Turnout		263,559	89.7	+1.7
Jamaat gain from AL				

=== Elections in the 1990s ===
General Election June 1996: Jessore-2
Party	Candidate	Votes	%	±%
AL	Rafiqul Islam	86,752	42.7	+4.9
BNP	Md. Ishaq	58,405	28.7	+4.0
Jamaat	Abu Saeed Md. Shahadat Hossain	48,393	23.8	−4.6
JP(E)	BM Selim Reza	4,774	2.3	+1.3
IOJ	Saiful Islam	3,352	1.6	N/A
Zaker Party	Abul Hossain	844	0.4	N/A
Bangladesh Samajtantrik Dal (Khalekuzzaman)	Hasinur Rahman	333	0.2	N/A
Gono Oikkya Front (Gull)	Md. Shamsul Haque	186	0.1	N/A
Jatiya Janata Party (Asad)	Aysha Akhtar	120	0.1	N/A
Majority		28,347	14.0	+4.6
Turnout		203,159	88.0	+15.8
AL hold				

General Election 1991: Jessore-2
Party	Candidate	Votes	%	±%
AL	Rafiqul Islam	62,373	37.8	
Jamaat	Md. Mokbul Hossain	46,854	28.4	
BNP	Md. Ishaq	40,854	24.7	
Independent	Md. Shamsul Haq	7,867	4.8	
NAP (Muzaffar)	Enamul Haq	2,712	1.6	
IOJ	Shamsul Haq	1,661	1.0	
JP(E)	Abu Taleb Mohammad Musa	1,641	1.0	
Zaker Party	Mizanur Rahman Mizan	1,106	0.7	
Majority		15,519	9.4	
Turnout		165,068	72.2	
AL gain from				
