= Kazi Khademul Islam =

Bangladeshi politician

Member of Bangladesh Parliament
- In office 1973–1979
- Succeeded by: Md. Golam Mustafa

Personal details
- Born: 31 January 1925
- Died: 28 March 1990 (aged 65)
- Party: Bangladesh Awami League

Kazi Khademul Islam (Bengali: কাজী খাদেমুল ইসলাম; 31 January 1925 – 28 March 1990) was a Bangladesh Awami League politician and a member of parliament for Jessore-1.

== Career ==
Islam was elected to parliament from Jessore-1 as a Bangladesh Awami League candidate in 1973.
