= Mohammad Shamsul Haque =

Mohammad Shamsul Haque was a Bengali police officer who was killed in the Bangladesh Liberation War in Chittagong by the Pakistan military. He was the superintendent of Police of Chittagong District in 1971. He was posthumously awarded the Independence Award, the highest civilian award in Bangladesh, in 2013.

Haque was married to Mahmuda Haque Choudhury.
