= Sheikh Akijuddin =

Bangladeshi entrepreneur (Akij Group) ABL

Sheikh Akij Uddin
- Born: 22 August 1929; Phultala, Bengal, British India
- Died: 10 October 2006 (aged 77); Singapore General Hospital, Singapore
- Occupation: Business
- Known for: founder of Akij Group
- Children: Sheikh Bashir Uddin; Sheikh Afil Uddin

Sheikh Akij Uddin (1929 – 10 October 2006) was a leading Bangladeshi entrepreneur and the founding chairman of Bangladeshi conglomerate Akij Group.

== Early life ==
Akij Uddin was born on 1929 in Madhyadanga, Phultala, Khulna, East Bengal, British Raj. He was an only child. He worked while in school and had to discontinue his studies to help his family income. He left home amidst the Bengal Famine for Calcutta .

== Career ==
He slept rough in Sealdah railway station in Kolkata while looking for work. He once saw retailers auctioning off fruits to vendors. He opened his store in Kolkaka called Nilamwala Chhay Ana (Auctioneer six ana) where everything cost six ana. He was arrested and fined after which he sold of his assets in Kolkata. He moved to Peshawar and stayed there for two years. He returned to Kolkata with some capital from Peshawar.

He started a small business in Kolkata, which he sold and returned to his home town in Phultala with 10 rupee. He met a friend of his father, Bidhu Bhushan, who used to manufacture Beedi (hand-rolled cigarettes). Akij Uddin started to manufacture beedi with Bhushans help in 1952. He opened up a grocery store alongside his beedi factory. From 1954 he sold them under Akij Beedi label. The companies were reorganized into Akij group in 1972.

== Family ==
Akij got married three times. Among his 15 children, there are 10 sons and five daughters. A son from his first marriage, Sheikh Afil Uddin was a member of the parliament from the Jessore 1 constituency. Another son from his third marriage, Sheikh Bashir Uddin is an adviser to the interim government of Bangladesh led by Muhammad Yunus.

== Death and legacy ==
Akij Uddin died on 10 October 2006 in Singapore.
