= Society to Save Rocks =

Not-for-profit entity in Hyderabad, India

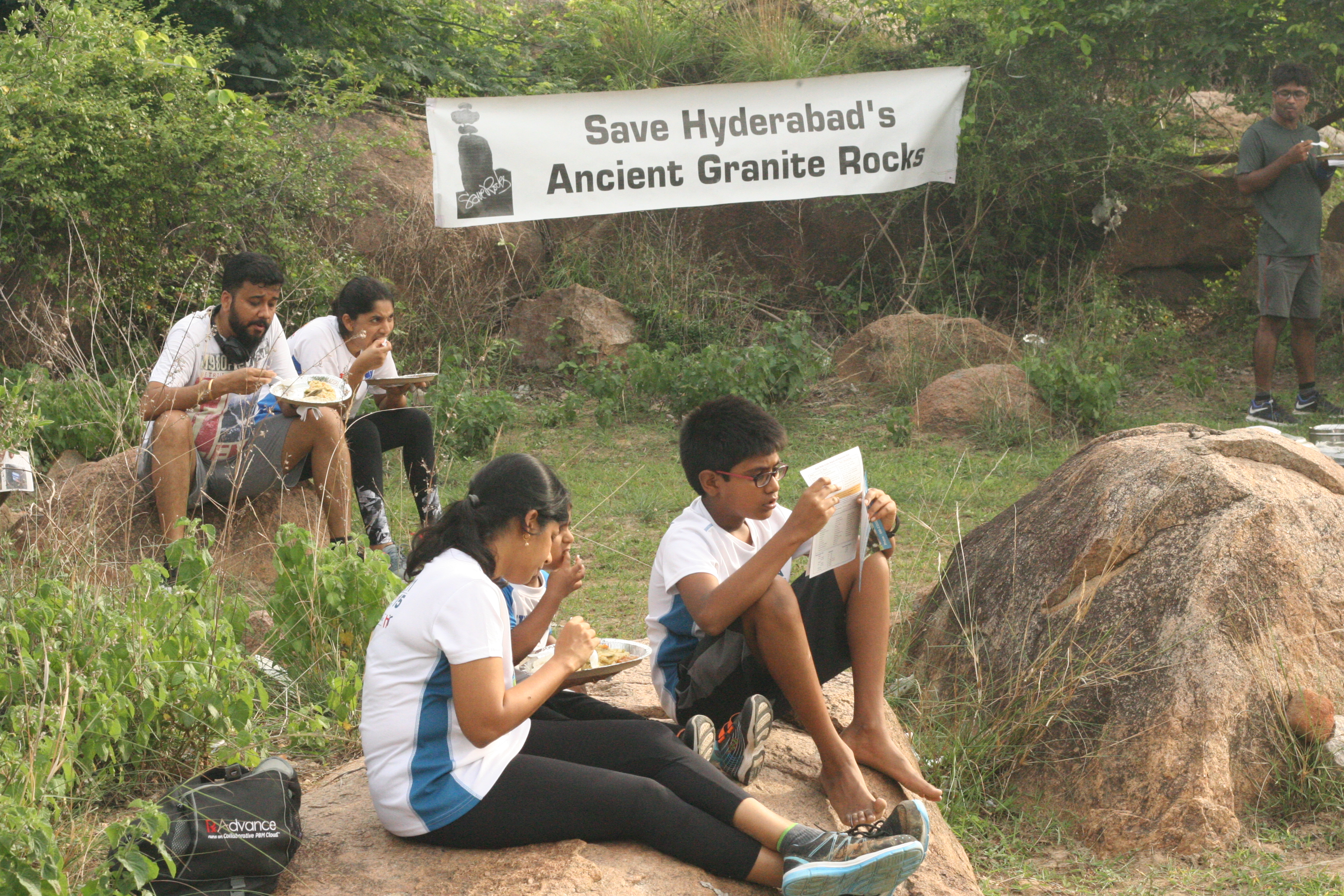
- A tell-tale message among the rocks
- Abbreviation: STSR
- Formation: 1996
- Founders: Frauke Quader, Laxma Goud, M. Hassan and others
- Founded at: Hyderabad
- Type: NGO
- Legal status: Not for profit society
- Purpose: Protecting rock formations
- Headquarters: Hyderabad, India
- Region served: Hyderabad and Secunderabad
- Official language: English
- Secretary General: Vacant
- President: Vacant
- Vice-President: Ms. Sangeeta Varma
- Joint Secretary: Ms. Padmini-B. Patell
- Treasurer: Mr. G. R. B. Pradeep
- Board of directors: Dr. Sudheer Bhan, Mr. Bharat Kumar P., Mr. Vanesh Eada, Mr. Diyanat Ali
- Key people: Ms. Frauke Quader (Advisor)
- Publication: Society to Save Rocks Quarterly Newsletter
- Website: www.saverocks.org/TheSociety.html

Society to Save Rocks is a not-for-profit entity established in 1996 in Hyderabad, India, by rocks enthusiasts with preservation motif, especially those rock formations abutting the twin cities of Hyderabad and Secunderabad amidst the Deccan Plateau. Frauke Quader, Laxma Goud, M. Hassan and others have been credited with the formation of the Society way back in the 1990s.

As a Hyderabadi interested in preservation of the rocks, Frauke Quader has much to share about the importance of the rocks,

- ...Rocks sustain a very special ecosystem with unique flora and fauna, and once destroyed they can never grow back

Notable civil servant Narendra Luther (1932–2021) had been associated with the society as a member and also held the position of elected president for more than a decade.

== Activities ==
Rock walks and Hyderabad Rockathon are two focal activities of the society that add visibility to its initiative to create interest. Since the past couple of years, the society has been associating itself with the Hyderabad Literary Festival as a partner and exhibiting rock photos and also conducting rock walks on the sidelines of the festival on the precincts of the Hyderabad Public School, Begumpet.

=== Rock walks ===
In order to create a public awareness, rock walks are held on every third Sunday of the month to various rock formations around the twin cities of Hyderabad and Secunderabad as well as to the adjoining districts in Telangana. A schedule of the rock walks is announced in advance each quarter and available on the web site of the Society.

=== Hyderabad rockathon ===
The society in association with Greater Hyderabad Adventure Club (GHAC) has been conducting Rockathons with the first one being held in the premises of the Hyderabad Central University way back in 2012.

Snippets of rock formations and rock walks
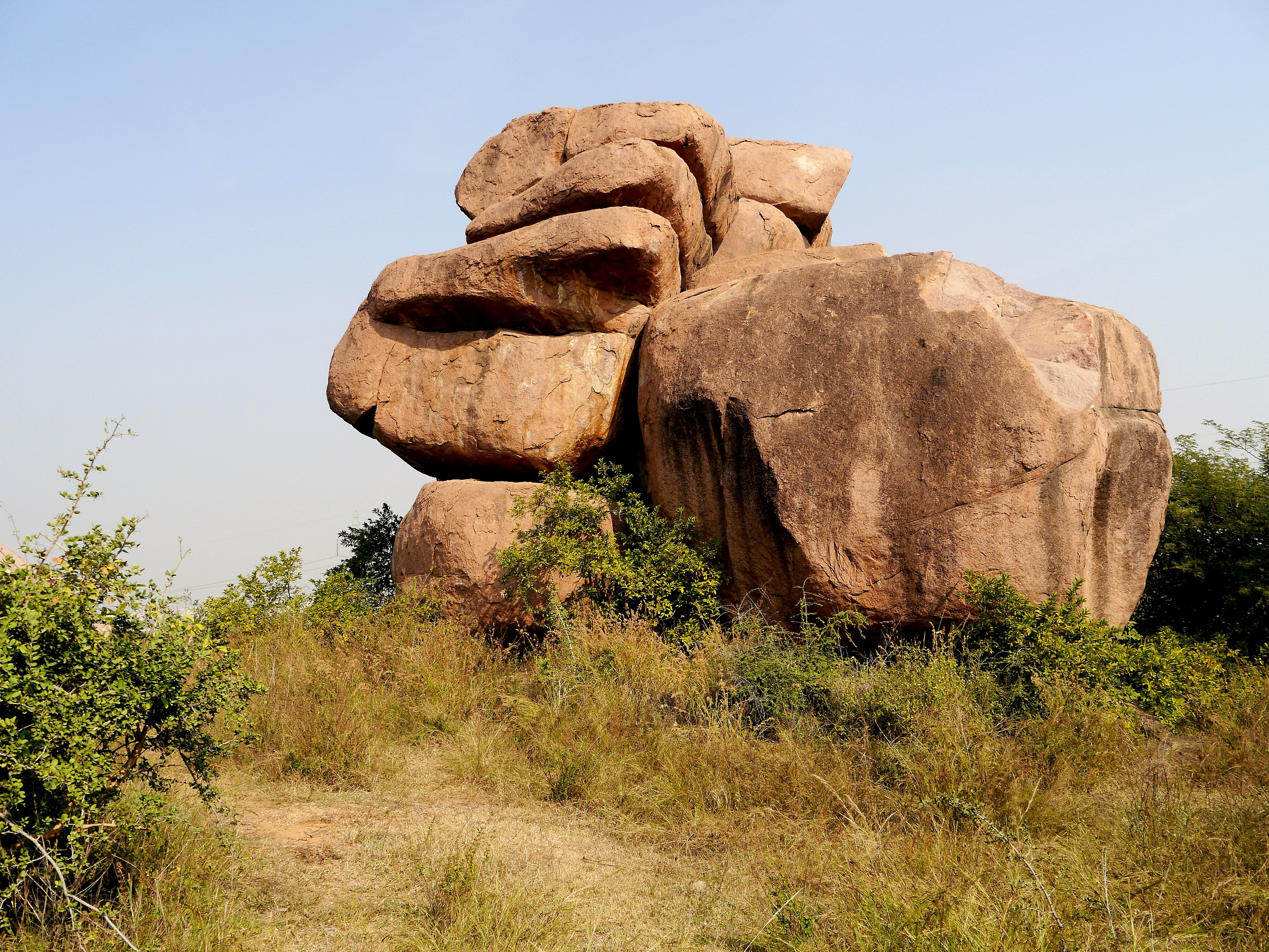
Elephant Ears situated in Ghar-e-Mubarak at Hyderabad

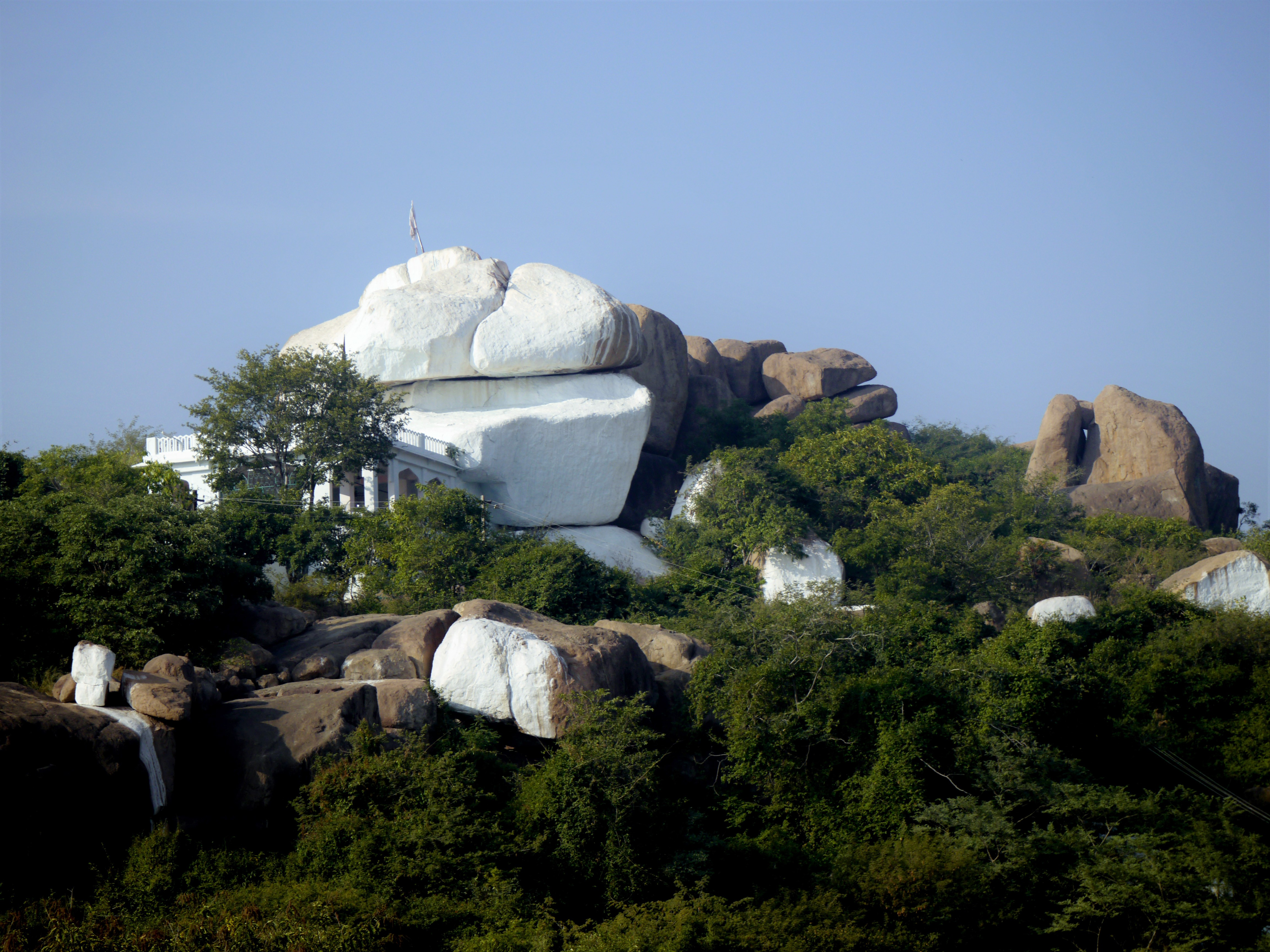
Kohe Imam situated at Ghar-e-Mubarak in Hyderabad.

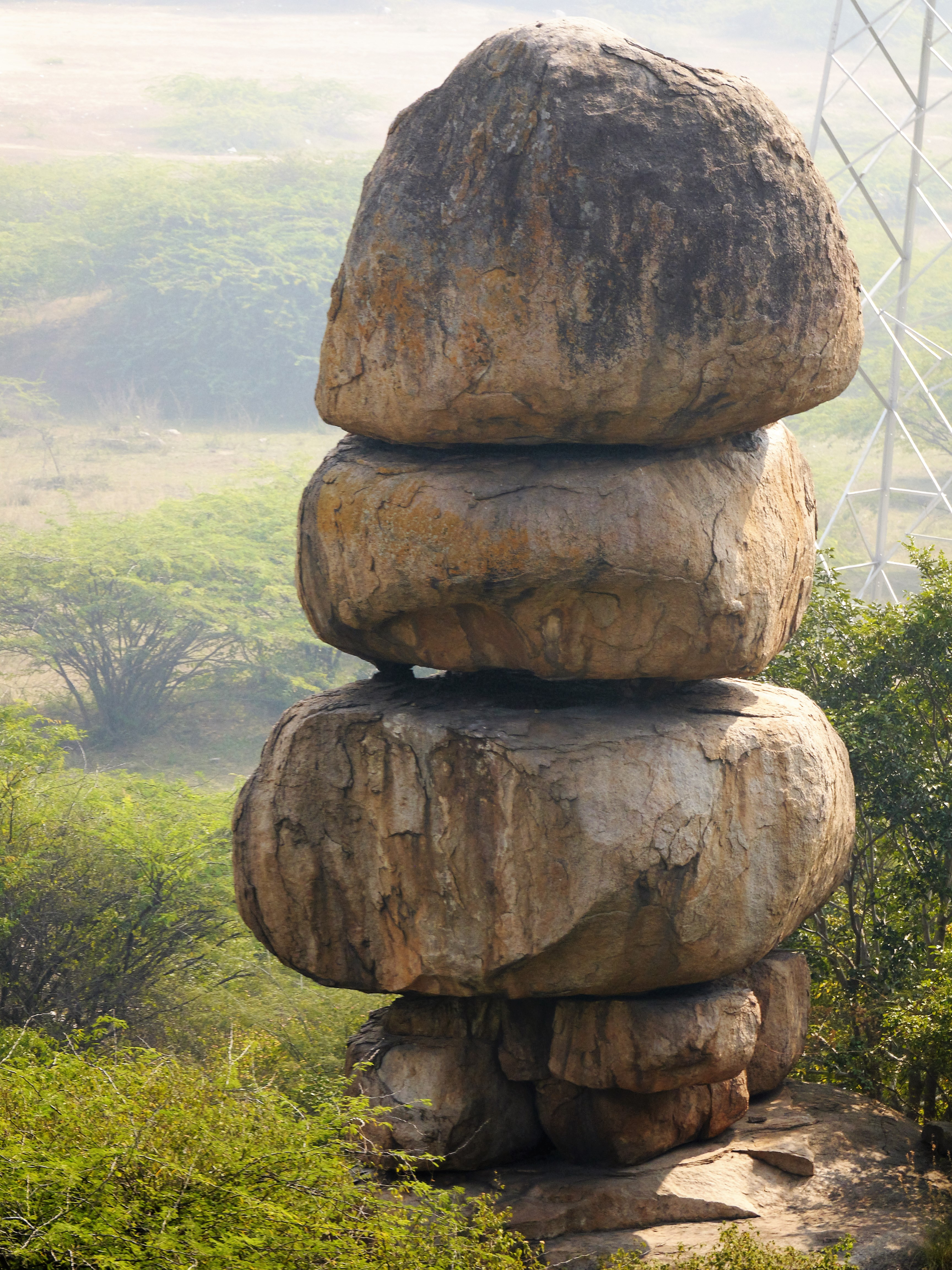
The five tiled rocks stand perfectly balanced at Ghar-e-Mubarak in Hyderabad

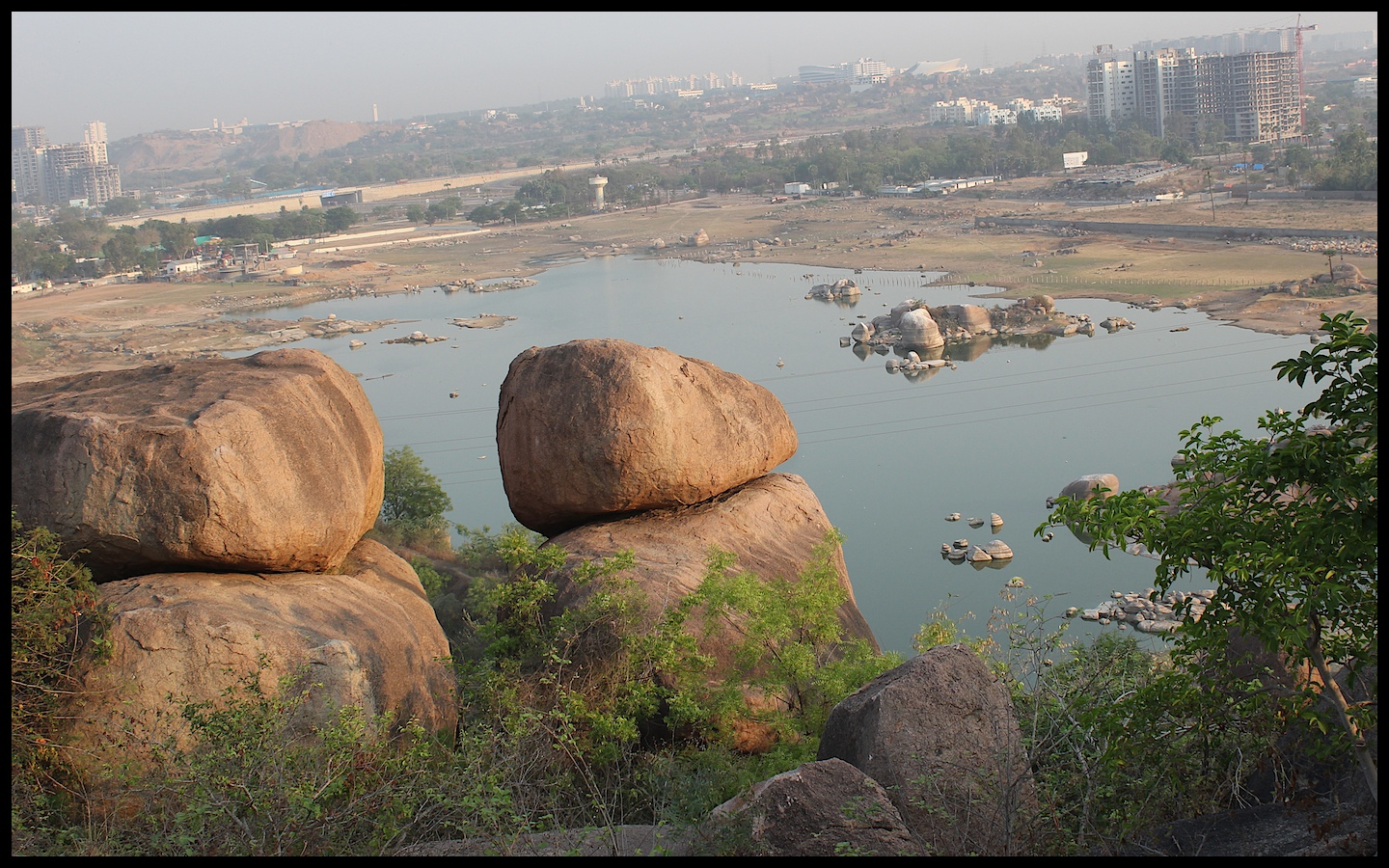
Khajaguda Hills (Fakhruddin Gutta)

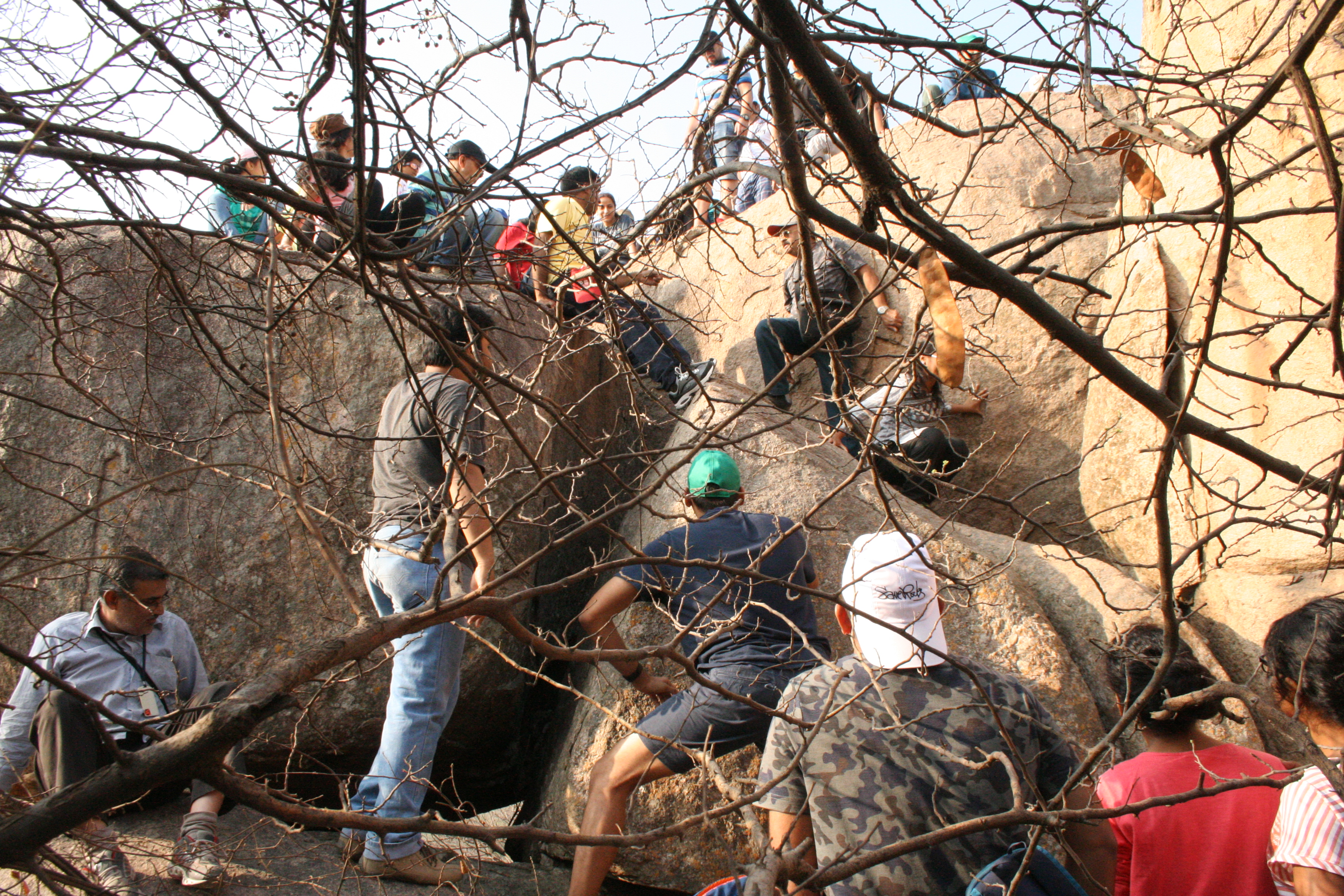
Enthusiasts crowd a rock formation

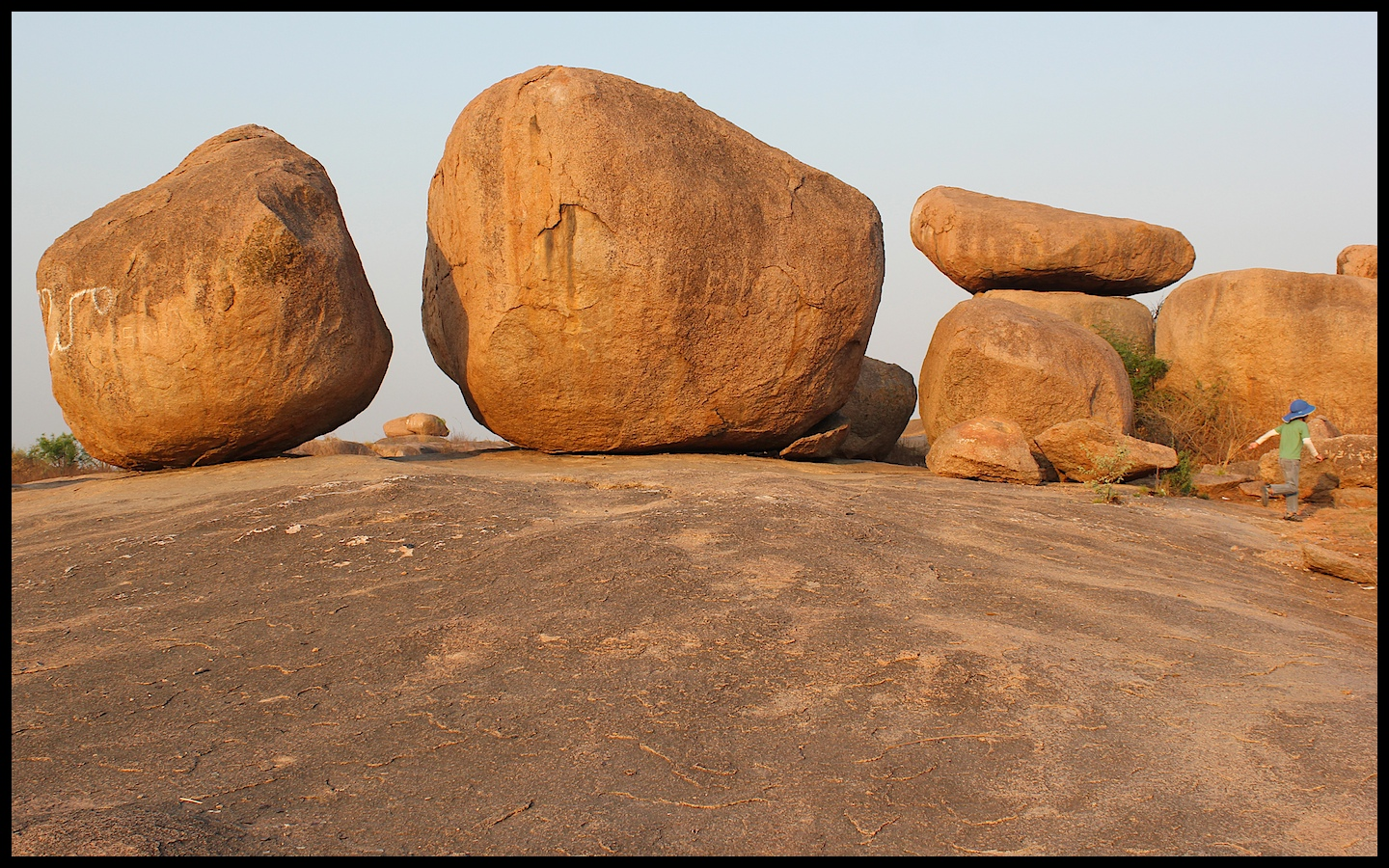
Rocks Fakhruddin Gutta Hyderabad

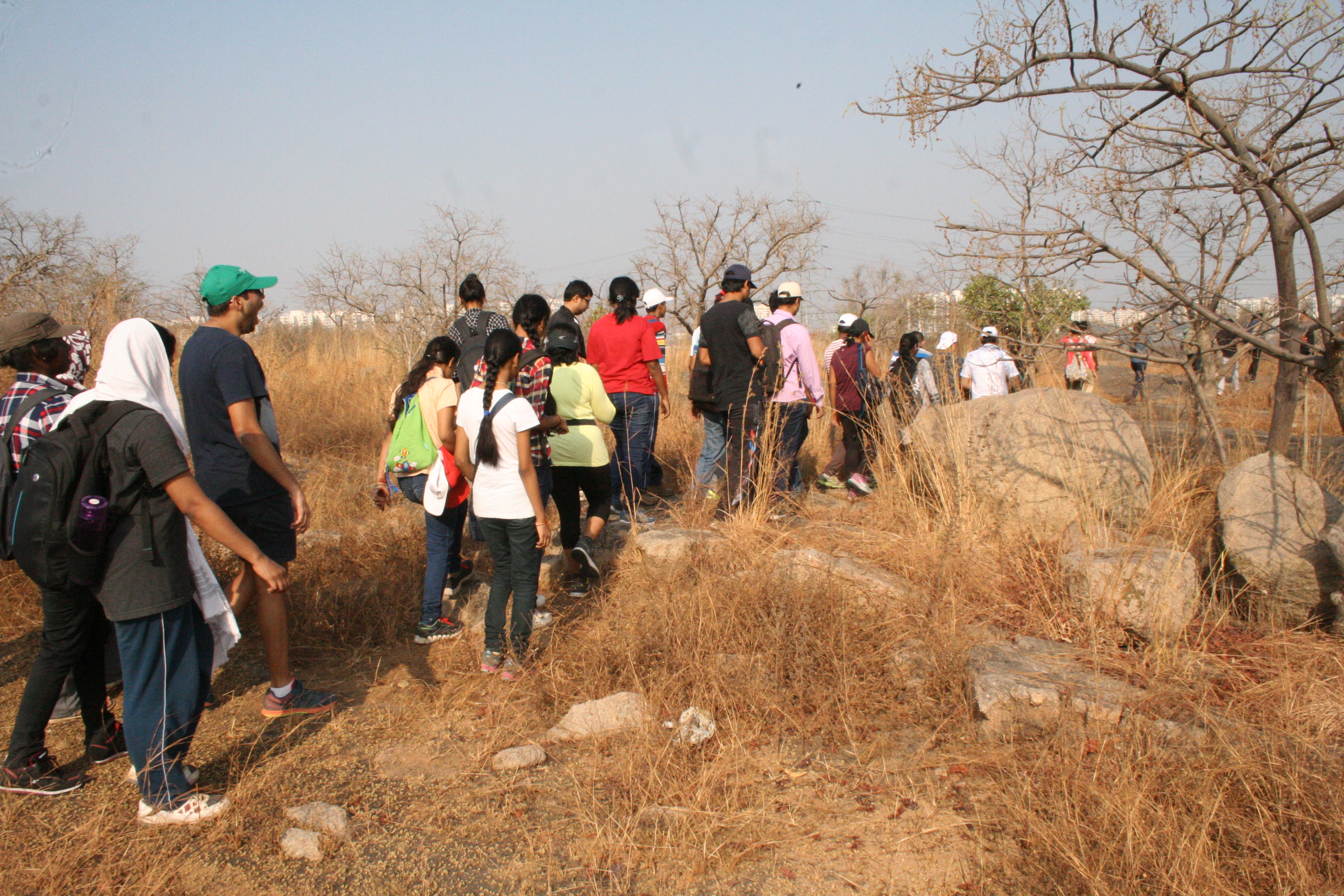
A rock walk underway

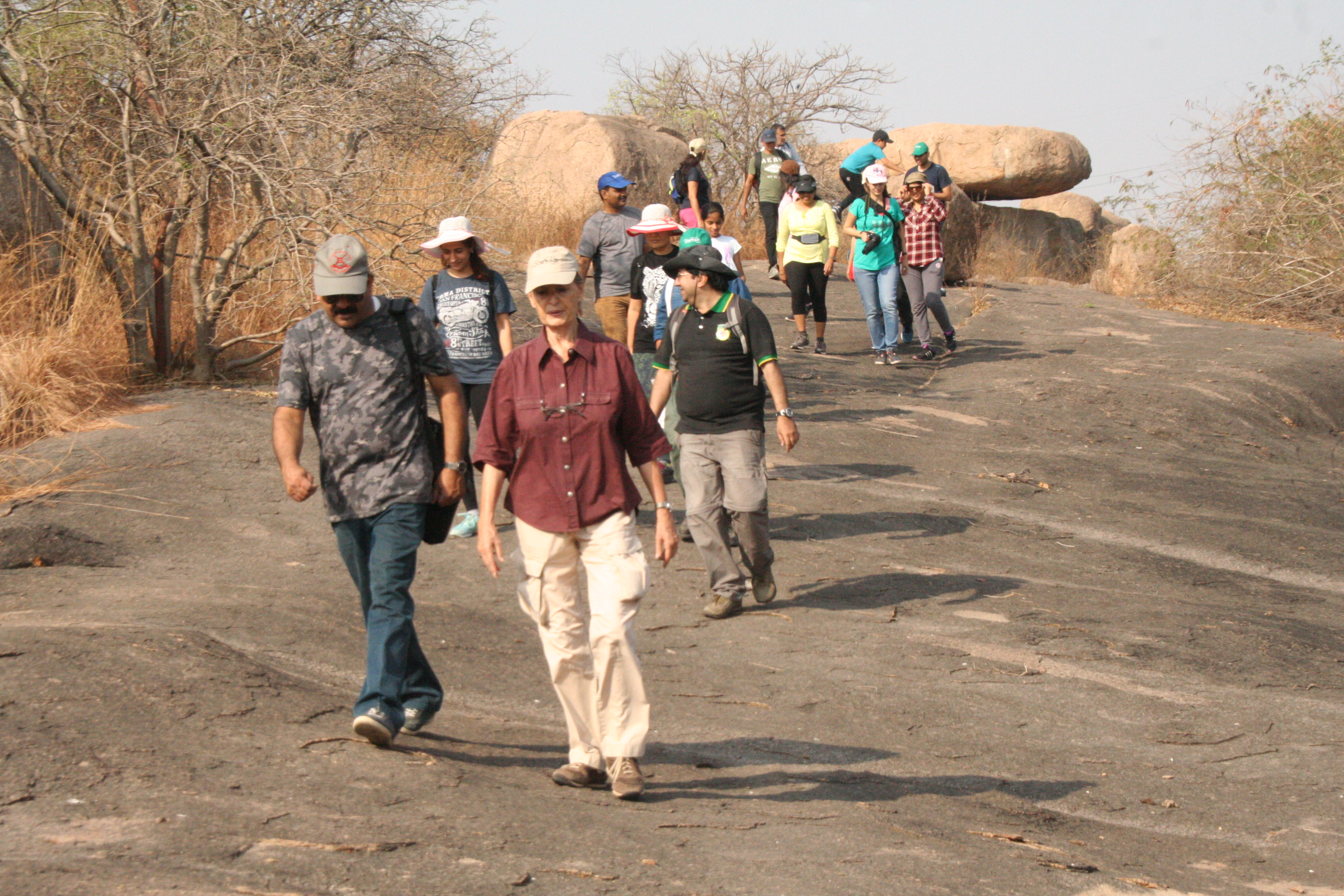
Frauke Quader in the forefront of a rock walk.
Rock walks at the Hyderabad Central University in MMXVIII
