= Nur-e-Alam Siddique =

Bangladeshi politician (1940–2023)

Noor-e-Alam Siddique
- নূরে আলম সিদ্দিকী
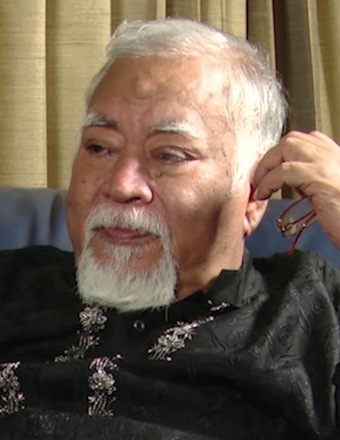

Member of Bangladesh Parliament
- In office 1973–1976
- Succeeded by: Maulana Nurunnabi Samdani

Personal details
- Born: 26 May 1944 Murshidabad district, Bengal Presidency, British India
- Died: 29 March 2023 (aged 82) United Hospital, Dhaka, Bangladesh
- Party: Bangladesh Awami League
- Other political affiliations: Awami League (Mizan)
- Children: Tahzeeb Alam Siddique

Noor-e-Alam Siddique (Bengali: নূরে আলম সিদ্দিকী; 26 May 1944 – 29 March 2023) was a Bangladeshi politician and businessman. He was particularly known for his involvement in the Bangladesh Liberation War and pre-independence era politics as a student leader. He served as a Member of Parliament for Jessore-2 in the first parliament, from 1973 to 1975.

== Early life and education ==
Siddique was born on 26 May 1944 to a Bengali Muslim political family in Murshidabad. His father, Nurunnabi Siddiqui, was a politician and follower of Huseyn Shaheed Suhrawardy.

Siddique began his education at the Kobindapur Primary School in Murshidabad. After the Partition of Bengal in 1947, he migrated with his family to Jheinadah in the Dominion of Pakistan. He completed his matriculation from Jhenaidah Model High School and Intermediate of Arts from KC College in 1962. He completed his Bachelor of Arts from Jagannath College, Dacca in 1964. He then proceeded to attaining master's degrees in Bengali language, political science and history from the University of Dacca, where he also graduated with a Bachelor of Laws in 1970.

== Career ==
Siddiqui was elected to parliament from Jessore-2 as a Bangladesh Awami League candidate in 1973. He was a leader of Sarbadaliya Chhatra Sangram Parishad. He was the Chairman of Doreen Group. He was the convener of Former Chatra League Members Foundation. He was previously the president of the foundation.

== Death ==
Siddiqui died on 29 March 2023, at 82 due to Sepsis. His body was buried on 29 March 2023, near his mosque he built in Savar, Dhaka.
