= A. M. S. A. Amin =

Bangladeshi politician and retired Major General

- আবুল মোহাম্মদ সামাউল আবদুল্লাহ আমিন

Ambassador of Bangladesh to Russia
- In office 17 January 1994 – 14 January 1996
- Preceded by: Mustafizur Rahman
- Succeeded by: Mostafa Faruk Mohammad

Personal details
- Born: Abul Mohammad Samaul Abdullah Amin; 28 July 1947 (age 78) Kurigram, Bengal, British India
- Party: Noitik Somaj

Military service
- Allegiance: Bangladesh
- Branch/service: Bangladesh Army
- Years of service: 1968–2001
- Rank: Major General
- Commands: GOC of 66th Infantry Division; Commander of 44th Infantry Brigade
- Battles/wars: Bangladesh Liberation War

Abul Mohammad Samaul Abdullah Amin is a retired Major General of the Bangladesh Army, a politician from Kurigram district and former ambassador.

== Career ==
Amin was a prosecutor in the court martial case over the assassination of Ziaur Rahman in 1981 when he was a colonel in Bangladesh Army.

Amin is the chairman of the Center for Security and Development Studies, a non-governmental organization.

Amin retired from the army and joined the Awami League in 2001. In 2003, he was elected president of the Kurigram district committee of the Awami League. He was defeated in the 8th parliamentary elections of 2001 which he contested from Kurigram-2 constituency with the nomination of Awami League. After that he joined Gono forum in 2018. He also lost the Kurigram-2 constituency in the eleventh parliamentary election.

Amin was the administrator of Kurigram district council.
