= Jessore-1 =

Constituency of Bangladesh's Jatiya Sangsad

Coordinates: 23.05°N 88.95°E

- Constituency for the Jatiya Sangsad
- District: Jessore District
- Division: Khulna Division
- Electorate: 263,500 (2018)

Current constituency
- Created: 1973
- Party: Bangladesh Jamaat-e-Islami
- Member of Parliament: Maulana Azizur Rahman
- ← 84 Jhenaidah-4 86 Jessore-2 →

Jessore-1 is a constituency represented in the Jatiya Sangsad (National Parliament) of Bangladesh.

== Boundaries ==
The constituency encompasses Sharsha Upazila.

== History ==
The constituency was created for the first general elections in newly independent Bangladesh, held in 1973.

== Members of Parliament ==
Election	Member	Party
1973	Kazi Khademul Islam	Awami League
1979	Md. Golam Mustafa	JaSaD
Major Boundary Changes
1986	Noor Hussain	Jamaat-e-Islami
1988	K. M. Nazrul Islam	Jatiya Party
1991	Tabibar Rahman Sarder	Awami League
Feb 1996	Mofiqul Hasan Tripti	BNP
Jun 1996	Tabibar Rahman Sarder	Awami League
2001	Ali Kadar	BNP
2008	Sheikh Afil Uddin	Awami League
2026	Muhammad Azizur Rahman	Bangladesh Jamaat-e-Islami

== Elections ==
=== Elections in the 2010s ===
Sheikh Afil Uddin was re-elected unopposed in the 2014 general election after opposition parties withdrew their candidacies in a boycott of the election.

=== Elections in the 2000s ===
General Election 2008: Jessore-1
Party	Candidate	Votes	%	±%
AL	Sheikh Afil Uddin	94,556	51.5	+5.6
Jamaat	Azizur Rahman	88,700	48.4	N/A
Independent	Noor Hussain	178	0.1	N/A
Majority		5,856	3.2	−4.4
Turnout		183,434	92.9	+4.1
AL gain from BNP				

General Election 2001: Jessore-1
Party	Candidate	Votes	%	±%
BNP	Ali Kadar	86,583	53.5	+20.5
AL	Sheikh Afil Uddin	74,254	45.9	+8.5
IJOF	K. M. Nazrul Islam	684	0.4	N/A
Independent	Mafiqul Hasan Tripti	225	0.1	N/A
Independent	Md. Taherjul Islam	64	0.0	N/A
Majority		12,329	7.6	+3.1
Turnout		161,810	88.8	+3.1
BNP gain from AL				

=== Elections in the 1990s ===
General Election June 1996: Jessore-1
Party	Candidate	Votes	%	±%
AL	Tabibar Rahman Sarder	46,114	37.4	−0.1
BNP	Ali Kadar	40,633	33.0	+12.0
Jamaat	Noor Hussain	32,294	26.2	−7.4
JP(E)	Md. A. Kadar	2,609	2.1	−5.4
IOJ	Abdus Samad	1,122	0.9	N/A
Jatiya Samajtantrik Dal-JSD	Md. Imamur Rahman	395	0.3	N/A
Majority		5,481	4.5	+0.7
Turnout		123,167	85.7	+11.4
AL hold				

General Election 1991: Jessore-1
Party	Candidate	Votes	%	±%
AL	Tabibar Rahman Sarder	36,747	37.5	
Jamaat	Noor Hussain	33,018	33.6	
BNP	Ali Kadar	20,618	21.0	
JP(E)	Abdul Mannan	7,361	7.5	
Zaker Party	Md. Mofazzel Hossain Babul	390	0.4	
Majority		3,729	3.8	
Turnout		98,134	74.3	
AL gain from				
