= Nasir Uddin (Jessore politician) =

Bangladeshi politician

Mohammad Nasir Uddin

Member of Bangladesh Parliament
- In office 7 January 2019 – 7 January 2024
- Succeeded by: Md Towhiduzzaman

Personal details
- Born: 1 January 1955 (age 71) Comilla
- Party: Bangladesh Awami League

Major General (Retd.) Mohammad Nasir Uddin (Bengali: মোহাম্মদ নাছির) is a Bangladesh Awami League politician and former member of parliament from Jessore-2. He served as major general in the Bangladesh Army at AMC Corps.

== Career ==
Uddin was elected to parliament from Jessore-2 as a Bangladesh Awami League candidate on 30 December 2018.
