= Hemayet Uddin (secretary) =

Bangladeshi diplomat (born 1948)

- হেমায়েত উদ্দিন

High Commissioner of Bangladesh to India
- In office 23 November 2003 – 8 March 2005
- Preceded by: Tufail Karim Haider
- Succeeded by: Liquat Ali Chowdhury

Ambassador of Bangladesh to Thailand
- In office 4 May 2001 – 15 November 2003
- Preceded by: Suhrab Hossain
- Succeeded by: Shahed Akhter

Personal details
- Born: 21 June 1948 (age 78) Dhaka, East Bengal, Dominion of Pakistan
- Education: University of Dhaka
- Occupation: Diplomat, civil servant

Hemayet Uddin (born 21 June 1948) is a retired Bangladeshi diplomat and former Foreign Secretary of the Ministry of Foreign Affairs. He has served in numerous diplomatic missions across Asia, North America, and Europe, and represented Bangladesh in senior roles at the Organization of Islamic Cooperation (OIC).

== Early life and education ==
Uddin was born in Dhaka, Bangladesh. He completed his Secondary School Certificate from St. Gregory's High School and College in 1964 and his Higher Secondary Certificate from Notre Dame College, Dhaka in 1966. He earned both his bachelor's and master's degrees in sociology from the University of Dhaka in 1969 and 1970, respectively.

== Diplomatic career ==
Uddin joined the Bangladesh Foreign Service in 1975. Throughout his career, he held various positions at the Ministry of Foreign Affairs and served in several Bangladesh embassies abroad. His overseas assignments included postings in India (twice), Belgium, the Netherlands, Luxembourg, the European Community (now European Union), the United States, and China.

He served as the Ambassador of Bangladesh to the Kingdom of Thailand, the Kingdom of Cambodia, and as the Permanent Representative to UNESCAP in Bangkok (2001–2003). From 2003 to 2005, Uddin was the High Commissioner of Bangladesh to India. He had replaced Tufail K. Haider in India. In 2005, Liaquat Ali Choudhury replaced Uddin as the High Commissioner of Bangladesh to India.

In 2005, he was appointed the Foreign Secretary of Bangladesh on a two-year contract. He served as secretary until the end of 2006. He accompanied Prime Minister Khaleda Zia on her official three-day visit to Pakistan.

Following his retirement from government service, Uddin joined the Organization of Islamic Cooperation (OIC) in Jeddah, Saudi Arabia, where he served as Ambassador and Director General from 2007 to 2014. At the OIC, he oversaw the Departments of Culture, Social & Family Affairs, and the interim Secretariat of the OIC Independent Permanent Human Rights Commission. He also chaired the Task Force responsible for establishing the commission. He was instrumental in improving OIC–West relations, working under the umbrella of the UN Alliance of Civilizations initiative.

== Bibliography ==
- A Neighbourly Affair: Assignment India
- Diplomacy in Obscurity: A Memoir
