= Bangladesh Itihas Samiti =

Learned society in Bangladesh

- Formation: 1966
- Headquarters: Dhaka, Bangladesh
- Region served: Bangladesh
- Official language: Bengali
- Secretary General: Professor Dr Asha Islam Nayeem
- President: Professor Sharif Ullah Bhuiyan
- Website: historyassociation.org

Bangladesh Itihas Samiti (also known as Bangladesh History Association) is a non-profit historical association in Bangladesh that publishes and supports research of the history of Bangladesh.

== History ==
Bangladesh Itihas Samiti was founded in 1966. The purpose of the association is to encourage the study of the history of Bangladesh and encourage collaboration between historians. The association is based in the History Department of the Arts Faculty of the University of Dhaka. The association has published a number of books on the history of Bangladesh. It is financed by membership fees, donations and government grants.

== See also ==
- Itihas Academy
