= Ali Kadar =

Bangladeshi politician

Member of Bangladesh Parliament

Personal details
- Died: 30 June 2017 New York City
- Party: Bangladesh Nationalist Party

Ali Kadar was a Bangladesh Nationalist Party politician and a member of parliament for Jessore-1.

== Career ==
Kadar was elected to parliament from Jessore-1 as a Bangladesh Nationalist Party candidate in 2001. In March 2005, his son attacked on duty traffic officers in Manik Mia Avenue, Dhaka and injuring one officer, who required stitches. He served as the president of Benapole Customs Clearing and Forwarding Agents Association. He had previously served as the Benapole Union Parishad Chairman.

== Death ==
Kader died on 30 June 2017 in New York City, United States.
