= Md Towhiduzzaman =

Bangladeshi politician

Towhiduzzaman Tuhin

Member of the Bangladesh Parliament for Jessore-2
- In office 10 January 2024 – 6 August 2024
- Preceded by: Nasir Uddin

Personal details
- Born: 20 January 1969 (age 57)
- Party: Awami League
- Occupation: Politician

Md. Towhiduzzaman Tuhin (born 20 January 1969) is a Bangladeshi physician and politician. He is a former Jatiya Sangsad member representing the Jessore-2 constituency.
