= Quazi Munirul Huda =

Bangladeshi politician

- কাজী মুনিরুল হুদা

Assembly Member for Jessore-2
- In office 15 February 1996 – 12 June 1996
- Preceded by: Rafiqul Islam
- Succeeded by: Rafiqul Islam

Personal details
- Born: Jessore District
- Party: Bangladesh Nationalist Party
- Children: 3

Quazi Munirul Huda is a politician of Jessore District of Bangladesh, a lawyer, and a former member of parliament for the Jessore-2 constituency.

== Early life ==
Quazi Munirul Huda was born in Jhikargacha Upazila in Jessore District.

== Career ==
Quazi Munirul Huda is a lawyer, BNP central committee member, and former general secretary of Jessore district. He was elected to parliament from Jessore-2 as a Bangladesh Nationalist Party candidate in the 15 February 1996 Bangladeshi general election.
