= Maqbool Hossain =

Bangladeshi politician

- মকবুল হোসেন

Member of Parliament from Jessore-2
- In office 1986–1988
- Preceded by: Nurunnabi Thamdani
- Succeeded by: Mir Shahadatur Rahman

Personal details
- Party: Islamic Democratic League, Bangladesh Jamaat-e-Islami

Maqbool Hossain is a politician of the Bangladesh Jamaat-e-Islami and a former member of parliament for Jessore-2.

== Birth and early life ==
Maqbool Hossain was born in Jhikargacha Upazila in Jessore District.

== Career ==
Maqbool Hossain was elected to parliament from Jessore-2 as a candidate of the Bangladesh Jamaat-e-Islami in 1986. He was defeated in the fifth parliamentary election.

== See also ==
- Jatiya Sangsad
