= Mahmuda Huq Chowdhury =

Mahmuda Haque Chowdhury
- মাহমুদা হক চৌধুরী

Ambassador of Bangladesh to Bhutan
- In office 13 January 1997 – 03 September 1998
- Preceded by: M. Mizanur Rahman
- Succeeded by: Saradindu Sekhar Chakma

Mahmuda Huq Chowdhury is a former diplomat and the ambassador of Bangladesh to Bhutan, the first woman ambassador of Bangladesh.

== Early life ==
When Chowdhury was born, her mother was only 14. Her mother ensured she was educated before marriage. She completed her master's in political science. She was married to Mohammad Shamsul Haque. Her husband was the superintendent of police of Chittagong District who supported Sheikh Mujibur Rahman during the Bangladesh Liberation War. He was killed by Pakistan Army on 17 April 1971 and his body was never recovered.

== Career ==
After the war, Chowdhury went with Budrunnessa Ahmad to meet President Sheikh Mujibur Rahman to ask for jobs for war widows on 18 January 1972. Rafiqullah Chowdhury appointed her as an Assistant Secretary to the Prime Minister's Office. Mujib asked Chowdhury what she wanted to become, and she replied to him that she wanted to be an ambassador. After asking about her qualification, he noted that while Pakistan did not allow women to join the foreign service Bangladesh would be a different nation. He ordered the creation of a quota of 10 percent in the Bangladesh Civil Service. She joined the foreign service in April 1972.

After Chowdhury joined the Ministry of Foreign Affairs she faced challenges as the first woman diplomat. There was no toilet for women in the building, so she had to go to a friend's house nearby. She worked as the protocol officer during a visit by the chief minister of West Bengal, Siddhartha Shankar Ray. She received foreign service training in Australia following a recommendation by the Australian high commissioner to Bangladesh. She recommended exporting guest workers from Bangladesh. She completed a second masters at the Fletcher School at Tufts University with support of senior ministry official Faruk Sobhan.

After the Assassination of Sheikh Mujibur Rahman, there was an attempt to remove Chowdhury from the foreign service. She called President Ziaur Rahman, who knew her husband during the war in Chittagong, and who supported her. She served as the first secretary at the High Commission of Bangladesh in Sri Lanka, and United Arab Emirates. She was the chargé d'affaires at the Bangladesh Embassy in the Philippines.

From 1996, to 1998, Chowdhury was the ambassador of Bangladesh to Bhutan, the first woman ambassador from the foreign service. Then she was appointed the Deputy High Commissioner of Bangladesh to the United Kingdom. She retired in 2000.

Chowdhury was the vice-president of the Bikalpa Dhara Bangladesh party led by former president A. Q. M. Badruddoza Chowdhury.

== Legacy ==
In 2021, a movie based on Chowdhury's husband and Chowdhury, Dampara, started production in 2021. Ferdous Ahmed would play her husband and Habib Bhabna will play her. The movie was being produced by the Chittagong Metropolitan Police.
