= Frauke Quader =

German-born Hyderabadi environmental activist

Ms. Frauke Quader
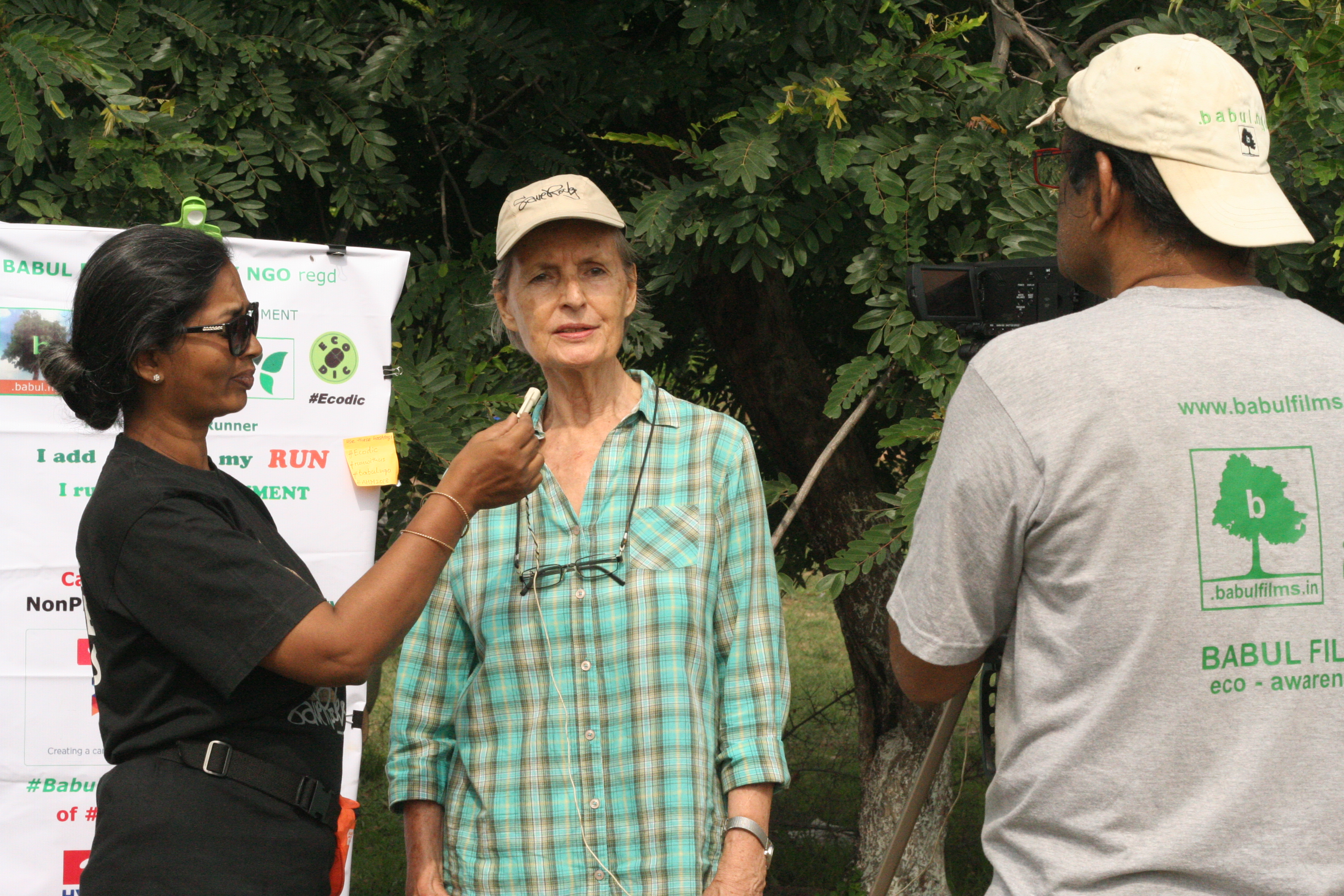
- Born: Wuppertal,Germany
- Citizenship: Indian
- Employer(s): German Foreign Office in Bonn (Germany), Brussels (Belgium) and New Delhi (India)
- Organization: Society to Save Rocks
- Known for: Espousing the cause of saving rocks

Frauke Quader is a German-born Hyderabadi environmental activist better known for her contribution espousing the cause of saving rock formations in the twin cities of Hyderabad and Secunderabad on the Deccan Plateau, especially in promoting the rocks as a heritage.

Frauke's interest in saving the rockscapes of Hyderabad along with fellow enthusiasts resulted in the formation of Society to Save Rocks, a registered Society which serves as a platform for many like-minded enthusiasts to gather and find ways and means to protect the rock heritage.
