= Mohammad Monirul Islam (politician) =

Bangladeshi politician

Md. Monirul Islam

MP

Personal details
- Born: Narail
- Party: Bangladesh Awami League

Mohammad Monirul Islam is a Bangladesh Awami League politician who served as member of parliament for Jessore-2 from 2014 to 2018.

== Early life ==
Mohammad Monirul Islam was born in Jhikargacha Upazila in Jessore District

== Career ==
Islam was elected to parliament from Jessore-2 on 5 January 2014 as a candidate of the Bangladesh Awami League. The party did not renominate him for the 2018 Bangladeshi general election.
