= Tabibar Rahman Sarder =

Bangladeshi politician

- তবিবর রহমান সরদার

Member of Parliament from Jessore-5
- In office 1973–1975

Member of Parliament from Jessore-1
- Incumbent
- Assumed office 1991-15 February 1996; June 1996-2001

Personal details
- Born: 1 May 1932 Jessore District
- Died: 3 April 2010 (aged 77) Jessore District
- Party: Bangladesh Awami League
- Relations: Islam

Tabibar Rahman Sarder (1 May 1932 – 3 April 2010) was a Bangladesh Awami League politician. He was elected a member of parliament in 1973 from Jessore-5. He was elected to parliament from Jessore-1 in 1991 and June 1996.

== Birth and early life ==
Tabibar Rahman Sarder was born 1 May 1932 in Jessore District.

== Career ==
Tabibar Rahman Sarder was elected a member of parliament in 1973 from Jessore-5. He was elected to member of parliament from Jessore-1 in 1991 and June 1996.

== Death ==
Tabibar Rahman Sarder died on 3 April 2010.

== See also ==
- Jatiya Sangsad
