= Noor Hussain =

Bangladeshi politician (c. 1930–2020)

Member of Parliament for Jessore-1
- In office 1986–1988
- Preceded by: Mohammad Golam Mostafa
- Succeeded by: K. M. Nazrul Islam

Personal details
- Born: c. 1930
- Died: 15 February 2020 (aged 90)
- Party: Bangladesh Jamaat-e-Islami

Noor Hussaim (c. 1930 – 15 February 2020) was a Bangladeshi lawyer and politician from Jessore belonging to Bangladesh Jamaat-e-Islami. He was a member of the Jatiya Sangsad.

== Biography ==
Hussain had been working as a lawyer since 1975. He was elected as a member of the Jatiya Sangsad from Jessore-1 in 1986.

Hussain died on 15 February 2020 at the age of 90.
