= Abu Sayeed Md. Shahadat Hussain =

Bangladeshi politician (1955–2020)

Muhaddis Abu Sayeed Md. Shahadat Hussain أبو سعيد محمد شهدات حسين

Member of Bangladesh Parliament
- In office 2001–2006

Personal details
- Born: 8 December 1955 Jhikargacha, Jessore, East Bengal, Pakistan
- Died: 30 May 2020 (aged 64) Jessore, Bangladesh
- Party: Bangladesh Jamaat-e-Islami
- Children: 5
- Profession: Teacher, Muhaddith

Abu Sayeed Md. Shahadat Hussain (8 December 1955 – 30 May 2020), commonly known as Muhaddis Abu Sayeed was a Bangladesh Jamaat-e-Islami politician and a member of parliament for Jessore-2. He was a Muhaddis, an Islamic speaker and scholar. He had a deep knowledge of Quran, Hadith, Fiqh, Usul al-Fiqh.

== Career ==
Muhaddis Abu Sayeed was elected to parliament from Jessore-2 as a Bangladesh Jamaat-e-Islami candidate in 2001.

== Death ==
Muhaddis Abu Sayeed died of a heart attack on 30 May 2020.
