= Akij Group =

Bangladeshi multinational conglomerate

- Type: Public
- Industry: Cement; Ceramics; Jute; Pharmaceuticals; Textiles
- Founded: January 1, 1940; 86 years ago Phultala, Khulna, Bangladesh
- Founder: Sheikh Akijuddin
- Headquarters: Simpletree Lighthouse, Plot 53, Road 21, Block B, Kemal Ataturk Avenue, Banani, Dhaka 1213, Bangladesh
- Revenue: ▲US$1.5 billion (2017)
- Number of employees: 70,000
- Website: akij.net

Akij Group is a Bangladeshi industrial conglomerate founded in the late 1940s by Sheikh Akijuddin. The first business including jute trade and beedi production which expanded to operate 20 companies by 2026, including textiles, food and beverages, cement, ceramics, and packaging. The conglomerate employs around 60,000 people and generates an annual turnover of more than $1.20 billion. In 2018, Akij Group sold its tobacco subsidiary to Japan Tobacco International for $1.47 billion, which became the largest single foreign direct investment in Bangladesh at that time.

== History ==
Akij Group is a conglomerate which started its business by doing trading jute at the late 1940s. Then, in the 1950s, it started producing beedi. Founded by Sheikh Akijuddin, it expanded in 2011 to packaging, textiles, hand board, pharmaceuticals, leather processing and real-estate business which employ more than 32,000 people.

In 1998, the Akij Group founded its sister company called ATML (Akij Textile Mills Ltd) which is located at Golora, Charkhanda in Manikganj. The company contributes $120 million to annual turnover of Akij group while operating in the 50 acres of land spanning13.31 lakh square feet. In 2025, ATML was awarded the Green Factory Award by the Government of Bangladesh.

In 2006, the conglomerate founded Akij Food & Beverage by investing 5,000,000,000 Bangladeshi Taka to build a factory with machinery imported from Germany. AFBLlaunched its product by branding Mojo toward young people. Mojo was launched for the first time in 14 April 2006.

In 2018, Akij sold their tobacco division to Japan Tobacco International for $1.47 billion. It was the largest single foreign direct investment in Bangladesh.I

In 2026, the conglomerate operates 20 companies, including jute yarn, particle board, cement, food & beverages, grain milling, ceramics, printing & packaging, shipping lines, and textiles. The company employs around 60,000 people with an annual turnover of more than $1.20 billion.

== Subsidiaries ==
=== Core & flagship industries ===
- Akij Biri Factory Ltd.
- Akij Cement Company Ltd.
- Akij Ceramics Company Ltd.
- Akij Food & Beverage Ltd.
- Akij Jute Mills Ltd.
- Akij Particle Board Mills Ltd.
- Akij Plastics Limited
- Akij Polymer Industries Limited
- Akij Steel Mills Limited
- Akij Textile Mills Ltd.
- Akij Tobacco Company Limited

=== FMCG, consumer & lifestyle ===
- Akij Bakers Limited
- Akij Bakery Limited
- Akij Bathware Limited
- Akij Electronics and Electricals
- Akij Electronics Limited
- Akij FMCG Limited
- Akij Footwear Ltd.
- Akij Health and Hygiene Ltd.
- Akij Leather Goods Limited
- Akij Shoes Limited
- Akij Tableware Ltd.
- Golden Akij Shoes Limited

=== Education & healthcare ===
- Ad-din Foundation
- Ad-din Mothercare Limited
- Ad-din Pharmaceuticals Limited
- Akij College of Home Economics
- Ad-Din Women's Medical College Hospital
- Akij Engineering Institute
- Akij Foundation School and College - flagship educational initiative of Akij Foundation, with campuses in Uttara, Manikganj, and Mohammadpur
- Akij Healthcare Limited
- Akij Institute of Technology

=== Finance, real estate & services ===
- Akij Capital Management
- Akij City Center Ltd
- Akij Consulting Limited
- Akij Real Estate Ltd.
- Akij Securities Ltd.
- Akij Takaful Life Insurance

=== Automotive, transport & energy ===
- Akij Air
- Akij Automotive Industry
- Akij Aviation Ltd.
- Akij BGBL product
- Akij Fuel Agency
- Akij Gas Company Ltd.
- Akij Gas Station Ltd.
- Akij Motors
- Akij Shipping Line Limited
- Akij Transport Agency Limited

=== Agro & natural resources ===
- Akij Agro feed Limited
- Akij Agro Limited
- Akij Bricks Limited
- Akij Paper Mills Limited
- Akij Agro Processing Limited
- Akij Rice Mill Industry
- Akij Flour Mill Industry
- Akij Wildlife Farm Limited
- Bahadurpur Tea Estates

=== Packaging & materials ===
- Akij BIAX Films Limited
- Akij Board
- Akij Buildtech Limited
- Akij Cartons Limited
- Akij Pipes & Fittings Limited
- Akij Printing & Packaging Ltd

=== Hospitality & leisure ===
- Akij Ecopark Ltd
- Akij Expedition Limited
- Akij Hotel and Resorts
- Akij Island Limited

=== IT & digital ===
- Akij Computer Ltd.
- Akij Online Ltd.
- Blue Pill Limited
- iBOS Limited

=== Historic / less active ===
- Akij Bicycle
- Akij Match Factory Ltd.
- Akij Zarda Factory Ltd.
- S.A.F Industries Ltd.
