= Jhikargacha Upazila =

Jhikargacha ঝিকরগাছা
- Upazila
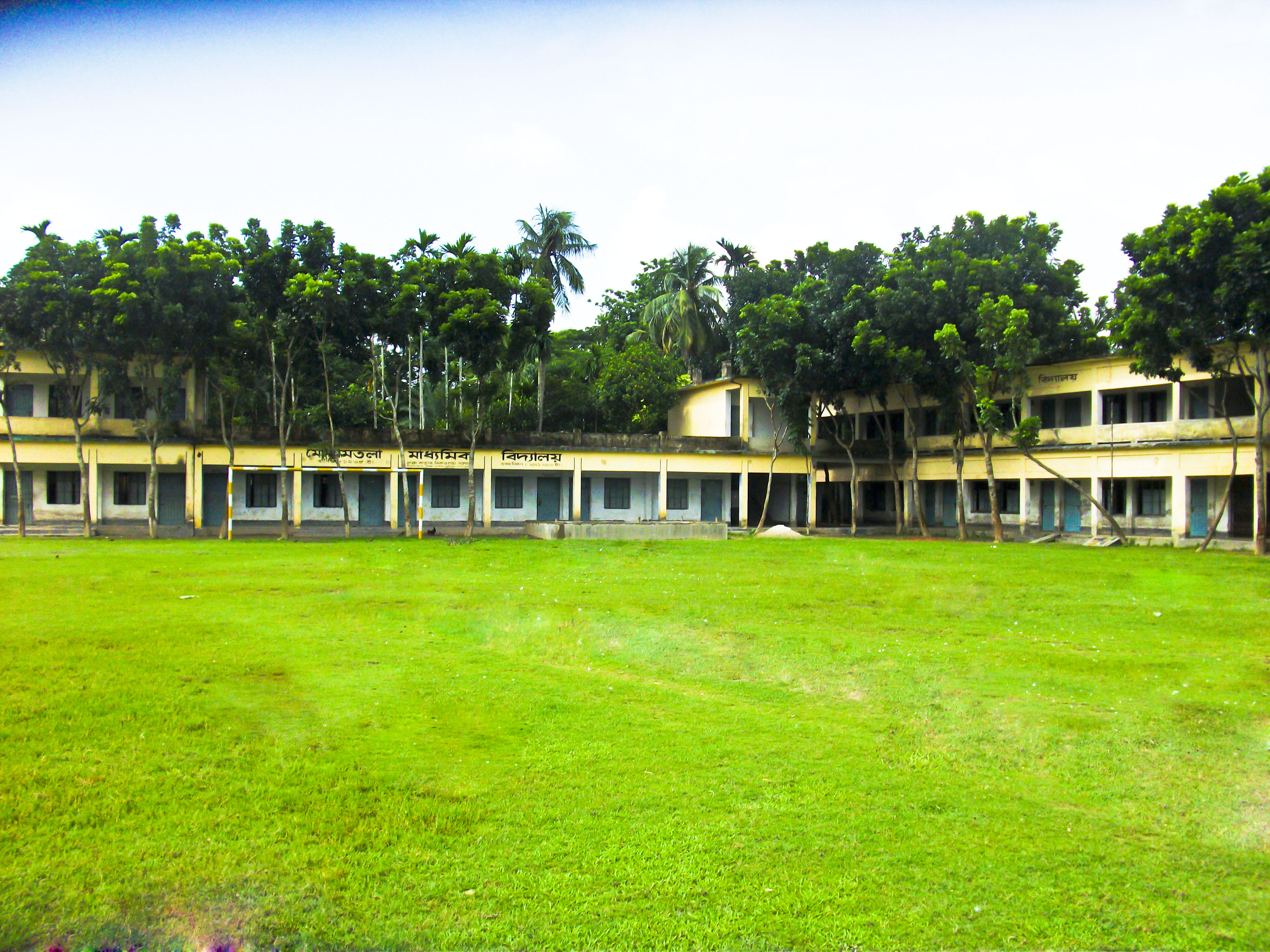
- Mokamtala School is in Jhikargacha Upazila

- Coordinates: 23°6′N 89°8′E
- Country: Bangladesh
- Division: Khulna
- District: Jessore

Area
  - Total: 307.96 km^{2} (118.90 sq mi)

Population (2022)
  - Total: 331,137
  - Density: 1,075.3/km^{2} (2,784.9/sq mi)
- Time zone: UTC+6 (BST)
- Postal code: 7420
- Area code: 04225
- Website: Official Map of Jhikargachha

Jhikargachha (Bengali: ঝিকরগাছা, Bengali pronunciation: [dʒʱikɔrɡatʃʰa]) is an upazila of Jessore District in the Division of Khulna, Bangladesh.

Jhikargachha Upazila mauza geocode map

== Demographics ==
Religions in Jhikargachha Upazila (2022)
Religion	Percent
Islam	94.64%
Hinduism	4.59%
Christianity	0.77%
Other or not stated	0.00%

According to the 2022 Bangladeshi census, Jhikargachha Upazila had 88,091 households and a population of 331,137. 8.60% of the population were under 5 years of age. Jhikargachha had a literacy rate (age 7 and over) of 76.35%: 79.04% for males and 73.87% for females, and a sex ratio of 93.06 males for every 100 females. 48,576 (14.67%) lived in urban areas.

As of the 2011 Census of Bangladesh, Jhikargachha upazila had 72,266 households and a population of 298,908. 59,174 (19.80%) were under 10 years of age. Jhikargachha had an average literacy rate of 53.02%, compared to the national average of 51.8%, and a sex ratio of 1032 females per 1000 males. 41,439 (13.86%) of the population lived in urban areas.

At the 1991 Bangladesh census, Jhikargachha had a population of 235,882. Males constituted 51.24% of the population and females 48.76%. The population aged 18 or older was 119,652. Jhikargachha had an average literacy rate of 27.9% (7+ years), compared to the national average of 32.4%.

== Administration ==
Jhikargacha thana was turned into an upazila in 1983.

Jhikargacha Upazila is divided into Jhikargacha Municipality and 11 union parishads: Bankra, Ganganandapur, Godkhali, Hajirbagh, Jhikargachha, Magura, Navaron, Nirbashkhola, Panishara, Shankarpur, and Shimulia. The union parishads are subdivided into 164 mauzas and 174 villages.

Jhikargacha Municipality is subdivided into 9 wards and 15 mahallas.

== Education ==
According to Banglapedia, Jhikargacha B. M. High School, founded in 1936, Ganganandapur High School (1940), Jhikargachha Pilot Girls High School (1953), Jhikargacha M. L. High School (1888), and Raghunath Nagar Secondary School (1922) are notable secondary schools.

== See also ==
- Upazilas of Bangladesh
- Districts of Bangladesh
- Divisions of Bangladesh
