= List of sugar products =

List of sugars

The following is a non-exhaustive list of common food products composed mainly of simple sugars.

== Commercial products ==
- Barley sugar – similar to hard caramel
- Beet sugar – made from sugar beets, contains a high concentration of sucrose
- Brown sugar – Consists of a minimum 88% sucrose and invert sugar. Commercial brown sugar contains from 4.5% molasses (light brown sugar) to 6.5% molasses (dark brown sugar) based on total volume. Based on total weight, regular commercial brown sugar contains up to 10% molasses.
- Cane sugar (cane juice, cane juice crystals), contains a high concentration of sucrose.
- Caramel – made of a variety of sugars
- Caster sugar
- Coconut sugar – 70-79% sucrose and 3-9% glucose and fructose
- Confectioner's sugar (also known as "icing sugar")
- Corn sugar – dextrose produced from corn starch
- Date sugar
- Dehydrated cane juice
- Demerara sugar
- Evaporated cane juice
- Grape sugar, grape juice
- Honey
- Jaggery – made from date, cane juice, or palm sap, contains 50% sucrose, up to 20% invert sugars, and a maximum of 20% moisture
- Maple sugar – around 90% sucrose
- Molasses (sugar beets)
- Molasses (sugar cane)
- Muscovado – a minimally processed sugar
- Non-centrifugal cane sugar – made by the simple evaporation of sugar cane juice.
- Palm sugar – made from sap tapped from the inflorescence of assorted varieties of palm
- Panela
- Penuche
- Powdered sugar
- Raw sugar
- Sweet sorghum
- Turbinado - a brown sugar with a larger crystals than Demerara sugar
- White sugar

== See also ==
- List of sugars
- List of syrups
