= Jashore Zilla School =

- যশোর জিলা স্কুল

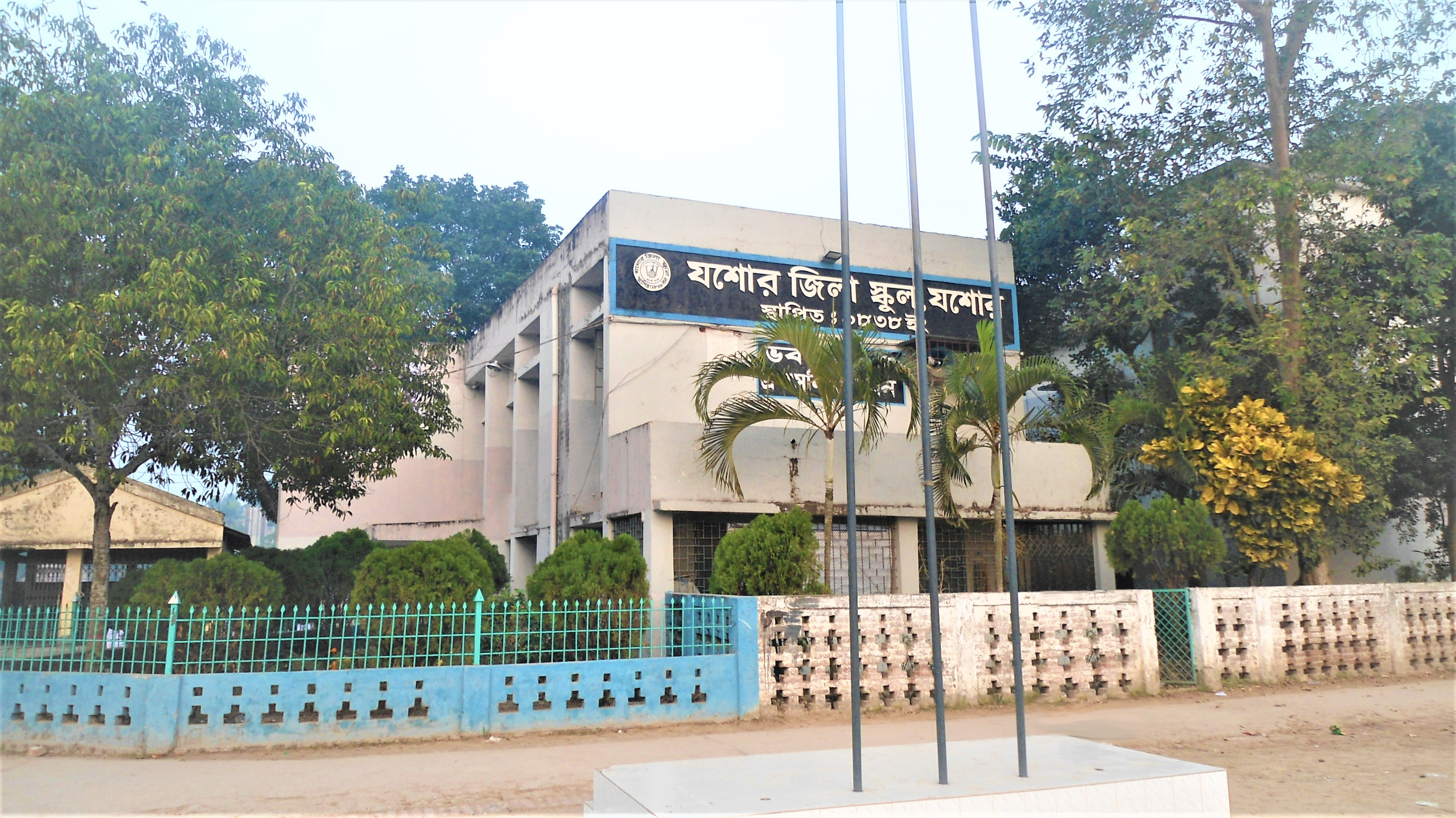

Location
- Jashore, 7400; Bangladesh; 23.1628°N 89.2062°E

Information
- Former names: Jessore Model School (1838-1872); Jessore Zilla School (1872-2018)
- School type: Primary and Secondary school Public
- Motto: পড় তোমার প্রভুর নামে (Read in the name of your Lord)
- Established: 1838; 188 years ago
- Founder: Government of British India
- School board: Board of Intermediate and Secondary Education, Jessore
- Head of school: Mohammad Joynul Abedin
- Teaching staff: 52
- Enrolment: 1852
- Classes: 3 to 10
- Language: Bangla
- Schedule: 7:15 AM to 4:30 PM
- Classrooms: 28
- Area: 11.59 acres (4.69 ha)
- Campus type: Urban
- Website: www.jzsj.edu.bd

Jashore Zilla School is a government school in the city of Jashore in Jashore District, Bangladesh. Established on 3 February 1838, it is one of the oldest schools in Bangladesh and the entire Bengal region. It is also recognized among the earliest institutional schools established during the British Raj in South Asia. About 1,852 students study in morning and day branches in this school. Among the famous teachers of Jashore Zilla School are Dr. Muhammad Shahidullah and Krishna Chandra Majumder.

== History ==
In 1835, the Governor of the then British India, Lord William Bentinck, introduced Western (English) education policy in India and took the initiative to establish an educational institution in several districts of the country. At that time, some educationists came forward, including Rani Katyayani, the wife of the landlord of Nandi Paragana, Raja Baradakant, Raja Kalikant Poddar, Ram Ratan, Md. Abdul Karim, Maulvi Md. Abdullah, Nilkamal Pal Chowdhury, Prince Dwarkanath Tagore, Kunjalal Tagore, Prannath Chowdhury, Shukdas Roy, Radhamohan Ghosh Chowdhury. With their sincere efforts and financial support, this school was established on 3 February 1838. The school started with 132 students. Initially started in the bungalow house of a local duchess, later the school got a grant of 7.8 acres of land at Khadki in Jessore and the school started there permanently. Formerly known as Jessore Model School, it was renamed Jessore Zila School in 1872. In 1971, the school was burnt by Rajakars, the school furniture and valuable documents due to Pakistani forces.

In 1874, education was introduced in Persian, followed by Urdu in 1947, for non-Bengali students. The then government of Pakistan included this school in the pilot project in mid-1963. And, it was in this year that the science branch was launched. Commerce wing was opened in 1965 and the humanities wing in 1970.

The first headmaster of the district school was Mr. J. Smith. Besides, several famous personalities of the subcontinent have taught in this school. For example, Dr. Muhammad Shahidullah, Krishna Chandra Majumder, Anees Siddiqui, Zillur Rahman Siddiqui, Sirajuddin Hossain, Prof. Mohammad Moniruzzaman, and Comrade Abdul Haque.

== Activities ==
Jashore Zilla School has two shifts open, morning and day shift. One of the largest auditoriums in Jashore city is in the school, besides the school has 4 administrative buildings, two ponds, a large playground, two garages, a mosque, and more than 1,850 students and more than fifty teachers teach here. Jashore Zilla School library has more than 5,000 books, several valuable and historical documents.

== Notable alumni ==
- M. Shamsher Ali, physicist
- Mohammad Sharif Husain, academic and philanthropist
- Mashiur Rahman, politician
- Mosharraf Hossain, politician
- Muhammad Shahidullah, linguist
- Md.Kowsar Ali, football and hockey player and coach
- Hafiz Ahmed Mazumder, businessman and politician

== See also ==
- List of Zilla Schools of Bangladesh
- Mymensingh Zilla School
