= Keria gula melaka =

Donuts made of sweet potato

Keria Gula Melaka
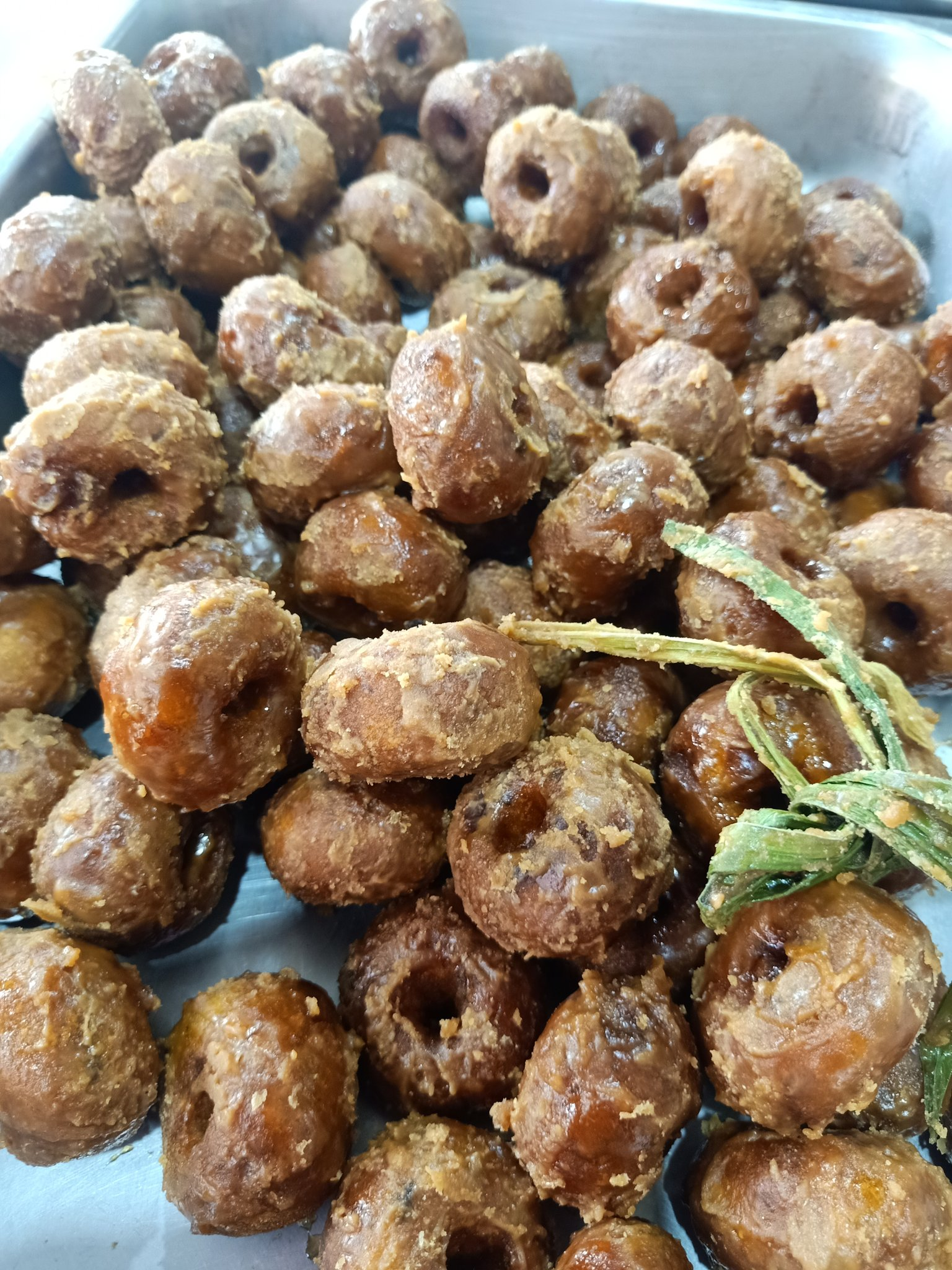
- Alternative names: Kuih Keria Melaka
- Type: Dessert
- Place of origin: Malaysia
- Region or state: Malacca
- Created by: Malay
- Main ingredients: Sweet potato, flour, baking powder, salt, cooking oil and palm sugar

Keria Gula Melaka is a type of doughnut that is made of sweet potato and topped with smoky gula Melaka, which is a type of Malaysian coconut palm sugar.

It is usually served during breakfast or teatime.

== See also ==
- Cuisine of Malaysia
