= Jessore District =

District in Khulna Division, Bangladesh

Jessore District যশোর জেলা
- District of Bangladesh
- Jashore District
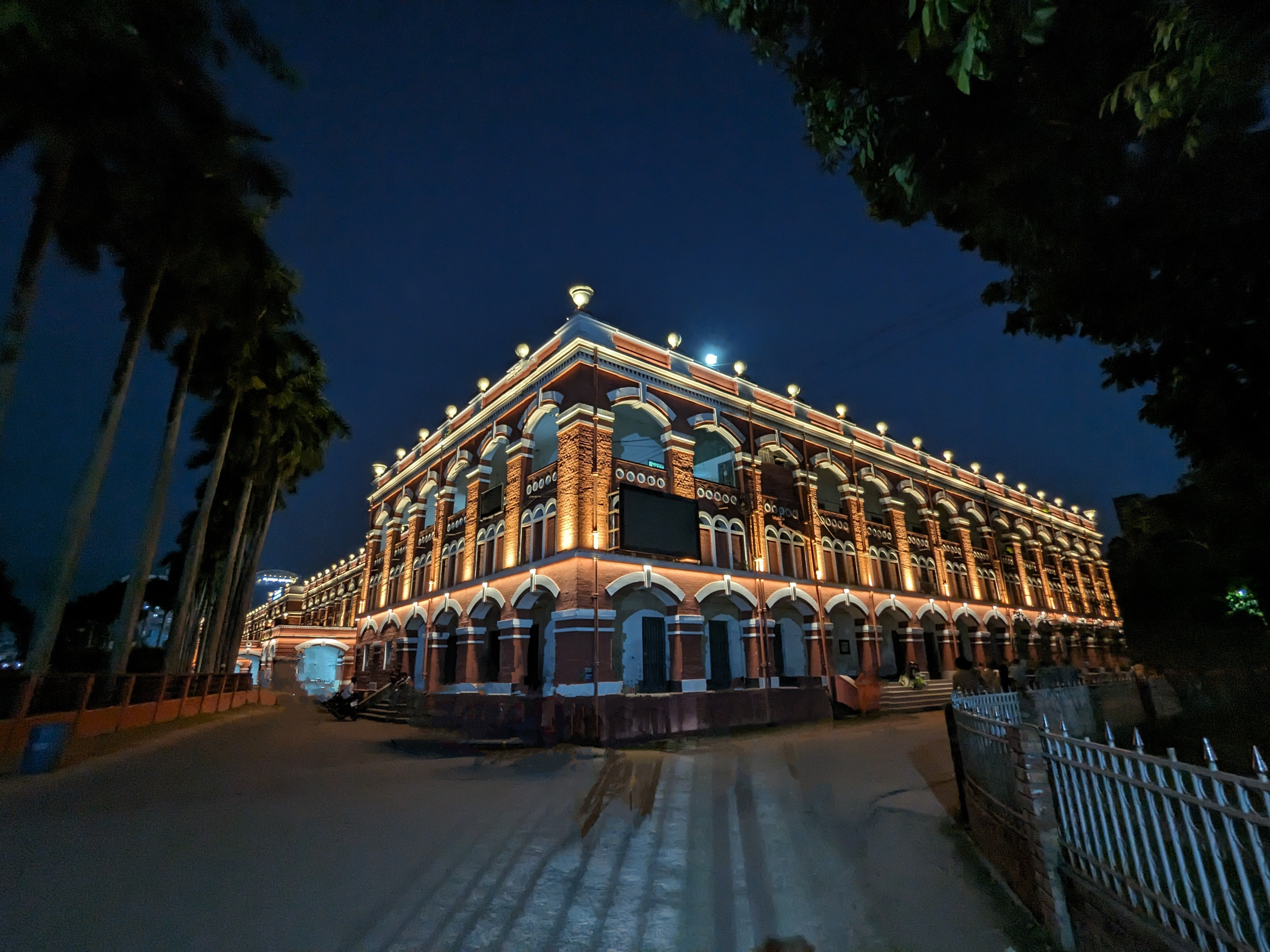
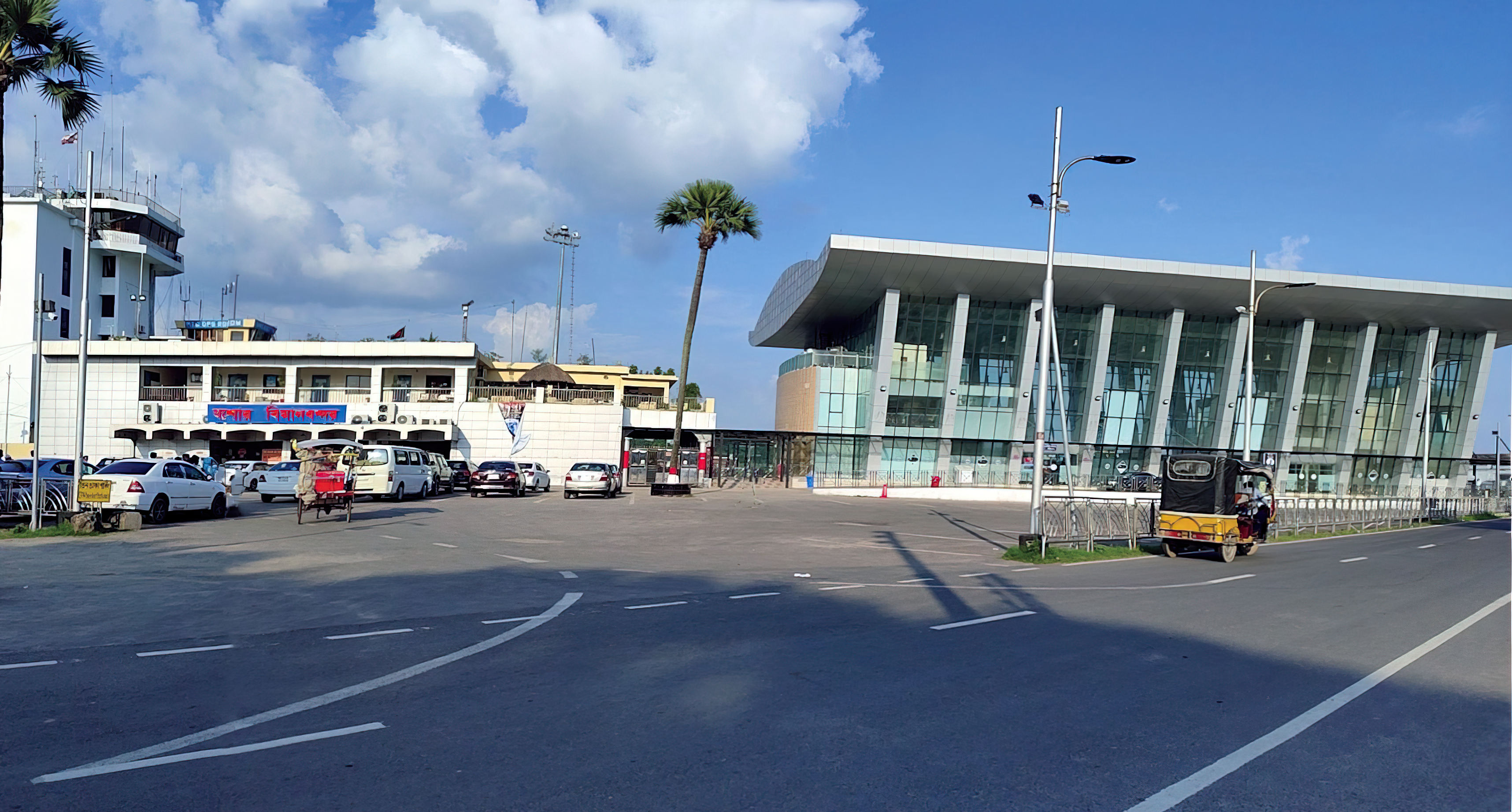
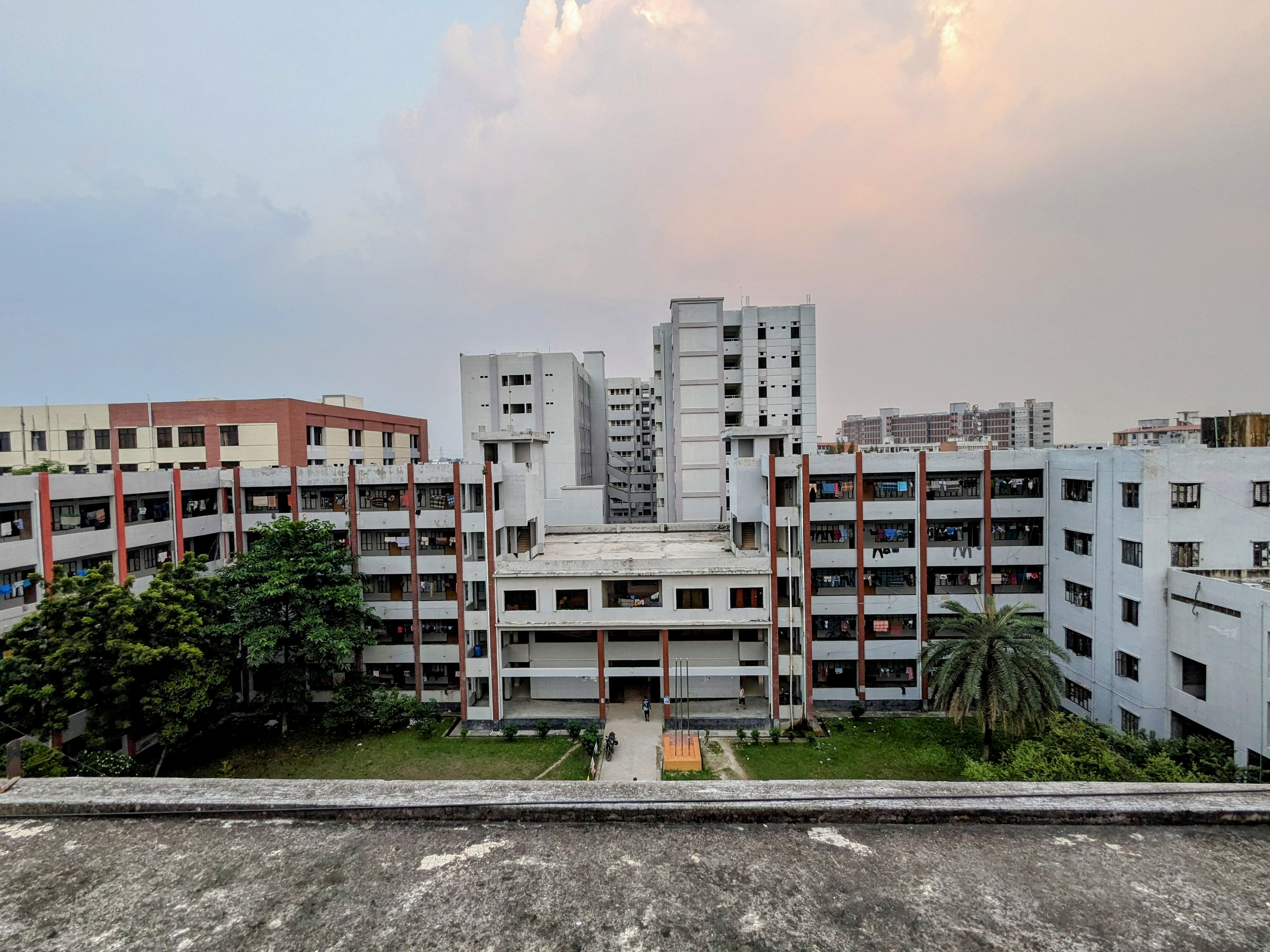
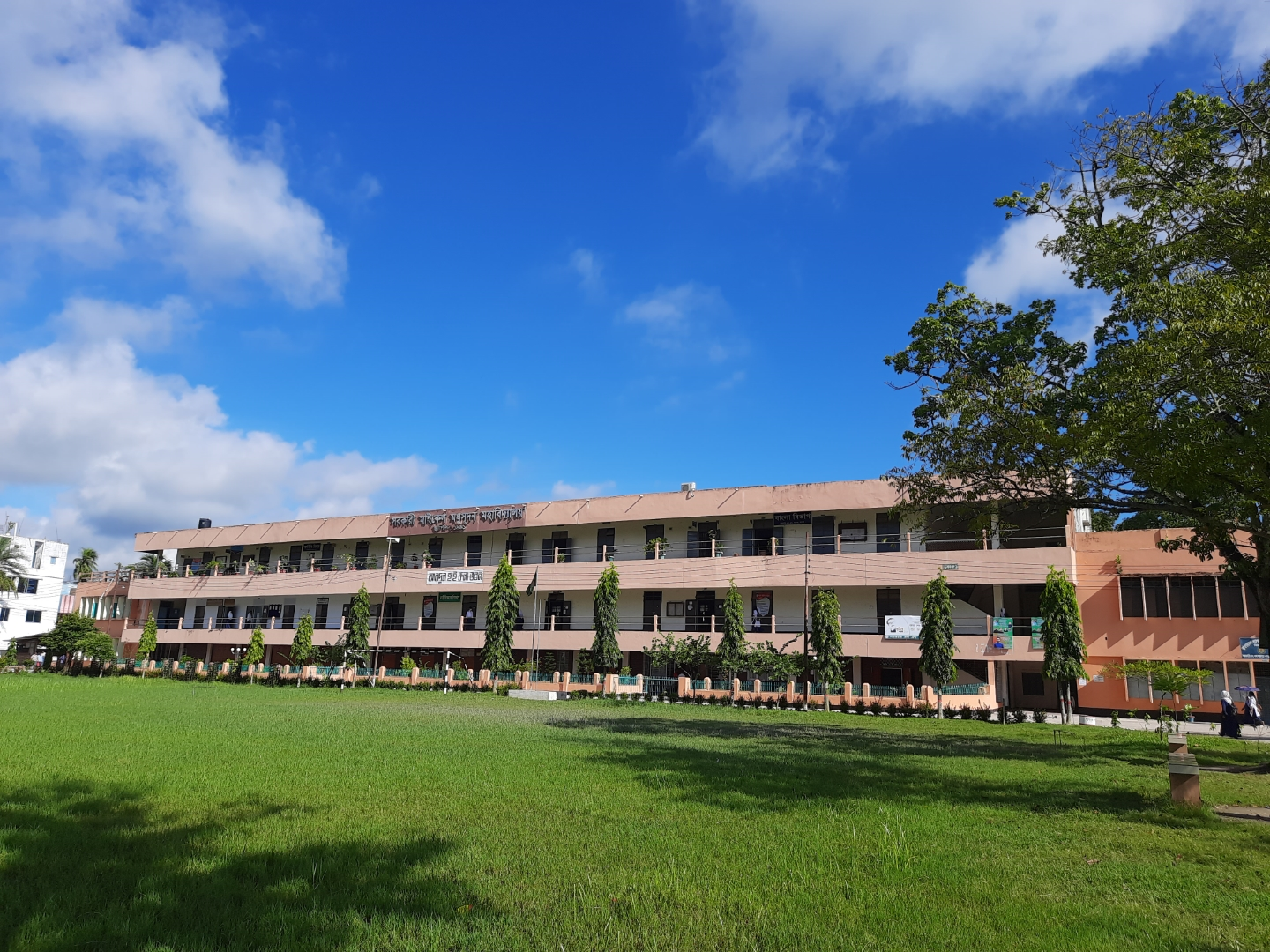
- Clockwise from top-left: Jessore Collectorate Building, Jessore Airport, Michael Madhusudan College, Jashore University of Science and Technology

- Location of Jessore District in Bangladesh
- Interactive map of Jessore District
- Location within Bangladesh
- Country: Bangladesh
- Division: Khulna
- District Established: 1781 (245 years ago)
- Headquarters: Jessore

Government
  - Deputy Commissioner: Md. Ashek Hasan Sagar (16083)
  - Chief Executive Officer: Md. Asaduzzaman

Area
  - Total: 2,606.94 km^{2} (1,006.55 sq mi)
- Elevation: 7 m (23 ft)

Population (2022)
  - Total: 3,076,144
  - Density: 1,179.98/km^{2} (3,056.14/sq mi)
- Postal code: 7400
- Area code: 0421
- ISO 3166 code: BD-22
- HDI (2023): ▲0.717 high · 2nd of 20
- Website: jessore.gov.bd

Jessore District upazila geocode map

Jessore District, officially Jashore District (Bengali: যশোর জেলা; Bengali pronunciation: [Jaw-shor Jela]), is a district in southwestern Bangladesh. It is bordered by India to the west, Khulna and Satkhira districts to the south, Khulna and Narail to the east, and Jhenaidah and Magura districts to the north. Jessore is the capital of the district. Jessore is the home to the ancestors of Rabindranath Tagore. Jashore was the first independent district of Bangladesh in 1971.

Jessore district was established in 1781. It consists of 8 municipalities, 8 upazilas, 92 unions, 1,329 mouzas, 1,477 villages and 120 mahallas. The upazilas are: Abhaynagar Upazila, Bagherpara Upazila, Chaugachha Upazila, Jessore Sadar Upazila, Jhikargachha Upazila, Keshabpur Upazila, Manirampur Upazila, and Sharsha Upazila.

The district produces a variety of crops. Date sugar, called patali, is made from the sap of locally grown date trees. It is cooked, thickened and crystallised using a traditional method. Patali is mainly produced in Khajura, but many date trees are cultivated in the Keshabpur Upazila and Manirampur Upazila areas.

== History ==
Jessore district once belonged to the ancient Janapada of Vanga (বঙ্গ) Janapada. In the 15th century, Jessore was a part of the kingdom of Pratapaditya. It was then conquered by the Mughals.

British administration was fully established in Jessore district in 1781 when the governor-general ordered the opening of a court at Murali near Jessore. In 1947, Jessore was divided between India and Pakistan. Except for the Bangaon and Gaighata thanas, the district became part of East Pakistan.

The Bengali soldiers stationed at Jessore Cantonment and mutinied against the Pakistan Army on 29 March 1971. They were led by Captain Hafiz Uddin and Lieutenant Anwar in an uprising where 300 soldiers were killed. The rebels killed 50 Pakistani soldiers at Chanchara.

== Geography ==
Jessore District encompasses 2606.94 km^{2}. It is bounded by Jhenaidah and Magura districts at the north, Satkhira and Khulna districts at the south, Narail and Khulna districts at the east, and North 24 Parganas and Nadia districts of West Bengal of India at the west. Major rivers that flow through this region are the Bhairab, Teka, Hari, Sree, Aparbhadra, Harihar, Buribhadra, Chitra, Betna, Kopotakkho, and the Mukteshwari.

=== Climate ===
Annual average temperature range from 15.4 to 34.6 °C (59.7 to 94.3 °F). The annual rainfall is 1,537 millimetres (60.5 in).

Climate data for Jessore
Month	Jan	Feb	Mar	Apr	May	Jun	Jul	Aug	Sep	Oct	Nov	Dec	Year
Mean daily maximum °C (°F)	22.9 (73.2)	27.0 (80.6)	33.4 (92.1)	41.0 (105.8)	38.1 (100.6)	32.6 (90.7)	31.4 (88.5)	31.6 (88.9)	32.1 (89.8)	31.5 (88.7)	29.2 (84.6)	24.9 (76.8)	31.3 (88.4)
Daily mean °C (°F)	15.4 (59.7)	19.3 (66.7)	26.1 (79.0)	34.6 (94.3)	33.0 (91.4)	29.2 (84.6)	28.4 (83.1)	28.6 (83.5)	28.7 (83.7)	27.2 (81.0)	23.1 (73.6)	17.8 (64.0)	26.0 (78.7)
Mean daily minimum °C (°F)	9.0 (48.2)	11.7 (53.1)	18.9 (66.0)	28.3 (82.9)	27.9 (82.2)	25.8 (78.4)	25.5 (77.9)	25.6 (78.1)	25.4 (77.7)	23.0 (73.4)	17.0 (62.6)	10.6 (51.1)	20.7 (69.3)
Average precipitation mm (inches)	11 (0.4)	19 (0.7)	40 (1.6)	77 (3.0)	168 (6.6)	314 (12.4)	304 (12.0)	293 (11.5)	245 (9.6)	144 (5.7)	28 (1.1)	8 (0.3)	1,651 (64.9)
Average relative humidity (%)	46	35	36	44	60	76	75	76	74	70	51	44	57
Source: National news papers

== Demographics ==
Historical population
Year	Pop.	±% p.a.
1974	1,335,342	—
1981	1,710,608	+3.60%
1991	2,106,996	+2.11%
2001	2,471,554	+1.61%
2011	2,764,547	+1.13%
2022	3,076,144	+0.98%

According to the 2022 Census of Bangladesh, Jessore District had 798,032 households and a population of 3,076,144 with an average 3.79 people per household. Among the population, 510,121 (16.58%) inhabitants were under 10 years of age. The population density was 1,180 people per km^{2}. Jessore District had a literacy rate (age 7 and over) of 56.5%, compared to the national average of 74.80%, and a sex ratio of 1,018 females per 1,000 males. Approximately, 23.39% of the population lived in urban areas. The ethnic population was 5,386.

Religions in Jessore District (2022)
Religion	Percent
Islam	89.62%
Hinduism	10.19%
Other or not stated	0.19%

Religion in present-day Jessore District
Religion	1941 (Note: 1941 figures are for Sadar subdivision and Sarsa thana of Bongaon subdivision of erstwhile Jessore district, which roughly corresponds to the present district.)		1981		1991		2001		2011		2022	
Religion	Pop.	%	Pop.	%	Pop.	%	Pop.	%	Pop.	%	Pop.	%
Islam	349,554	62.44%	1,427,885	83.47%	1,822,747	86.51%	2,170,973	87.84%	2,446,162	88.48%	2,756,729	89.62%
Hinduism	208,647	37.27%	277,764	16.24%	278,315	13.21%	293,841	11.89%	310,184	11.22%	313,592	10.19%
Others (Note: Including Jainism, Christianity, Buddhism, Zoroastrianism, Judaism, Ad-Dharmis, or not stated)	1,644	0.29%	4,959	0.29%	5,934	0.28%	6,740	0.27%	8,201	0.30%	5,823	0.19%
Total Population	559,845	100%	1,710,608	100%	2,106,996	100%	2471,554	100%	2,764,547	100%	3,076,144	100%

The Muslim population is the majority religion, while Hindus, the largest minority, have been growing much more slowly. There is a community of around 5,300 Christians in the district, mainly in Jhikargachha and Jessore Sadar upazilas.

The main occupations are agriculture 39.84%, agricultural labour 24.13%, other wage labour 2.68%, commerce 11.99%, service 8.66%, industry 1.41%, transport 3.11% and others 8.18%.

Jessore District's administrative framework was established in 1781. It consists of the following eight upazilas

Upazila	Area in km^{2}	2011 Census population
Abhaynagar	247.21	262,434
Bagherpara	308.29	216,897
Chaugachha	269.31	231,370
Jhikargachha	307.96	298,908
Keshabpur	258.44	253,291
Jessore Sadar	435.22	742,898
Manirampur	444.20	417,421
Sharsha	336.28	341,328

The upazilas are further divided into nine municipalities, 36 wards, 92 unions, 1,329 mouzas, 1,434 villages and 120 mahallas.

== Economy ==
The economy of Jessore District is traditionally agrarian, but in recent decades it has diversified into industry, trade, services, and communications. Due to its geographical position, Jessore is considered a commercial gateway to the south-western region of Bangladesh. The district is home to the country's largest land port Benapole Land Port, the domestic Jessore Airport, railway and road networks, and the Noapara River Port.

=== Agriculture ===
Agriculture remains the backbone of Jessore’s economy. Major crops include rice, wheat, jute, maize, potatoes, vegetables, and a variety of fruits. Jessore is especially known for its flower cultivation; flowers grown in Godkhali, Jhikargacha and Sharsha are supplied across the country. The district was once famous for its date juice and molasses, which are still produced during winter. Aquaculture is another significant sector; numerous ponds and hatcheries in the district produce fish and fry (spawn) that are supplied nationwide.

=== Industry ===
Jessore has a growing light engineering and mechanical workshop industry. Small factories and workshops produce and repair vehicles, motorcycles, agricultural machinery, and other equipment. Traditional industries include wooden furniture, bamboo and cane products, and handmade combs. The government has also approved the establishment of an Export Processing Zone (EPZ) and an economic zone in Jessore, which are expected to attract both local and foreign investment.

=== Trade and communication ===
Benapole Land Port is the largest land port in Bangladesh and serves as the principal gateway for trade with India. Many local residents are engaged directly or indirectly in port-related businesses. The Noapara River Port facilitates trade in goods such as coal, fertilizers, and industrial raw materials. Jessore has road and rail links with Dhaka and other districts, supporting the transport of agricultural and industrial products. Jessore Airport, the only operational domestic airport in the south-western region, plays a vital role in business and tourism.

=== Infrastructure and services ===
Almost every union in the district now has access to electricity, which has boosted irrigation, cottage industries, and service activities. Rural roads, bridges, and culverts have improved the marketing of agricultural products. Jessore is also emerging in the field of information technology. A Hi-Tech Park is under construction in the district headquarters, which is expected to become a future hub for the IT industry.

=== Challenges and prospects ===
Despite progress, many agricultural and industrial sectors in Jessore lag behind in modern technology and quality control. Climate change and natural disasters pose challenges to agricultural activities. However, sectors such as flower cultivation, fruits and vegetables, aquaculture, date-based products, light engineering, and information technology hold great potential to make Jessore one of the most promising economic regions of Bangladesh.

== Arts and culture ==
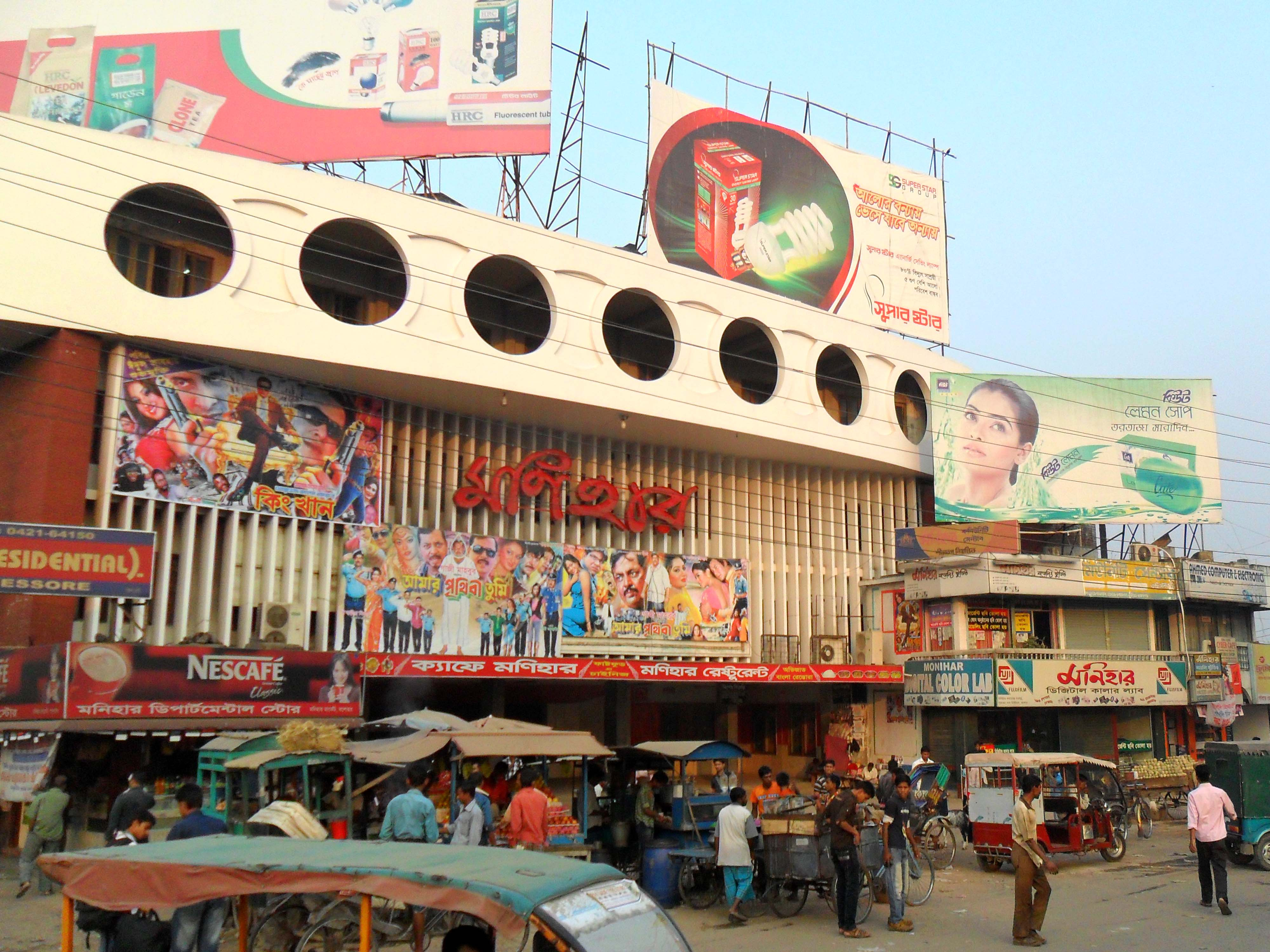
Monihar is the last remaining cinema hall in the city of Jessore.

There were 21 cinema halls in the district in 2000. As of 2021, only six survive: four in smaller towns, and two in the city of Jessore. One of the latter, Tosbir Mohol, once the country's second oldest theater with a revolving stage, is being restored for stage productions. The other, Monihar, the largest cinema hall in Bangladesh when it was built in 1983, with 1400 seats, reported record revenues in 2022.

Jessore-based theater troupe Bibartan has staged more than 4,000 performances (stage plays, street theater, and works for children) since their founding in 1989.

Jessore Institute Public Library, established in 1854, is one of the oldest public libraries in the Indian subcontinent.

== Sports ==
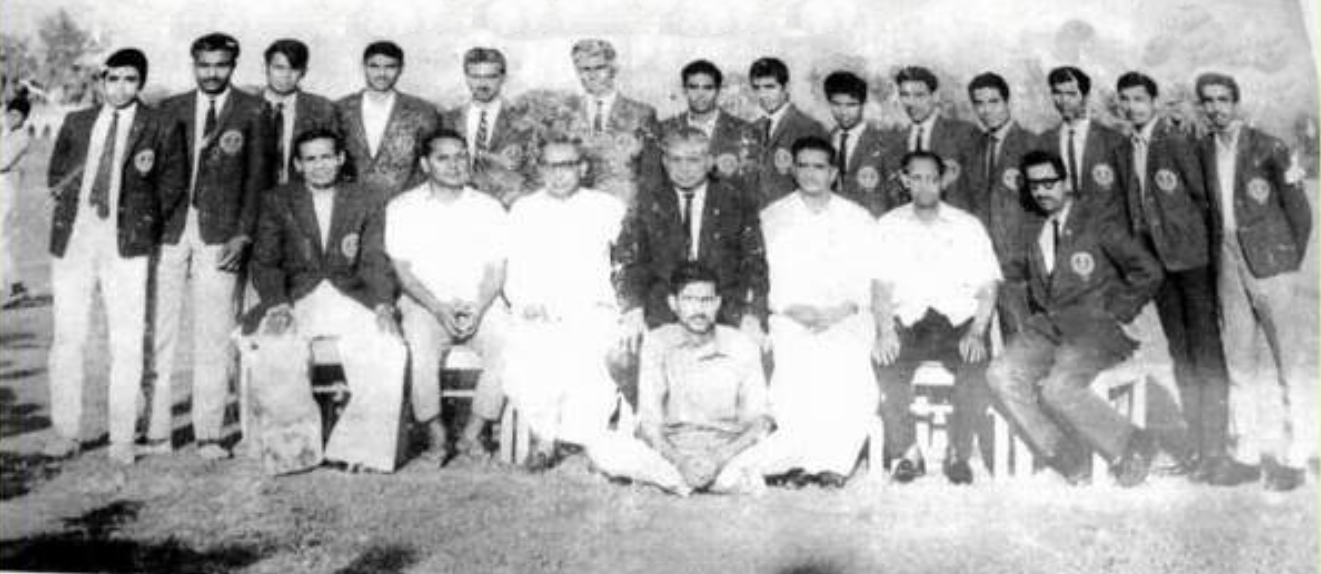
1968 East Pakistan National Football Championship runners-up Jessore District football team.

Football and cricket are the two most popular sports in Jessore. Cricketers from the district represent the South Zone in the Bangladesh Cricket League. In football, Jessore most notably won the National Football Championship in 1976. Notable footballers from the district includes Mannaf Rabby, Kowsar Ali, and Rabby Hossen Rahul. Lutfor Rahman, a member of the Shadhin Bangla football team, also hailed from the district. In 1973, the Jessore Zonal football team hosted a historic game against Dinamo Minsk from the Soviet Union, which ended in a 0–9 defeat. The Shamsul Huda Stadium, formerly known as the Jessore Stadium, serves as the district's main venue for football and cricket. The stadium notably hosted the Pakistan National Football Championship in 1968. The Shams-Ul-Huda Football Academy, operated by the Jessore District Sports Association (JDSA), is one of the most notable football academies in the country.

== Points of interest ==
- Sagardari is the birthplace of the poet Michael Madhusudan Dutta. His large villa consists of a huge garden, a small museum and houses. The front gate has a solid sculpture work. The Kobodak River is at a stone's throw away
- Bharat Bhaina (locally called Bharter Dewl) is the relics of ancient Buddhist Temple of the 6th century at Keshabpur
- Mirzanagar Hammamkhana is a structure of Mughal's at Keshabpur
- Dhalijhara Buddha Bihar is one of the outstretched and unique Buddhist Temples of the 8th century among South Asia at Keshabpur
- Sheikhpura 3 Domed Mosque
- Khan Jahan Ali's Dighi at Keshabpur
- Marshina Baor, a proposed ecopark at Keshabpur
- Jhikargachha Upazila
- Abhaynagar Upazila

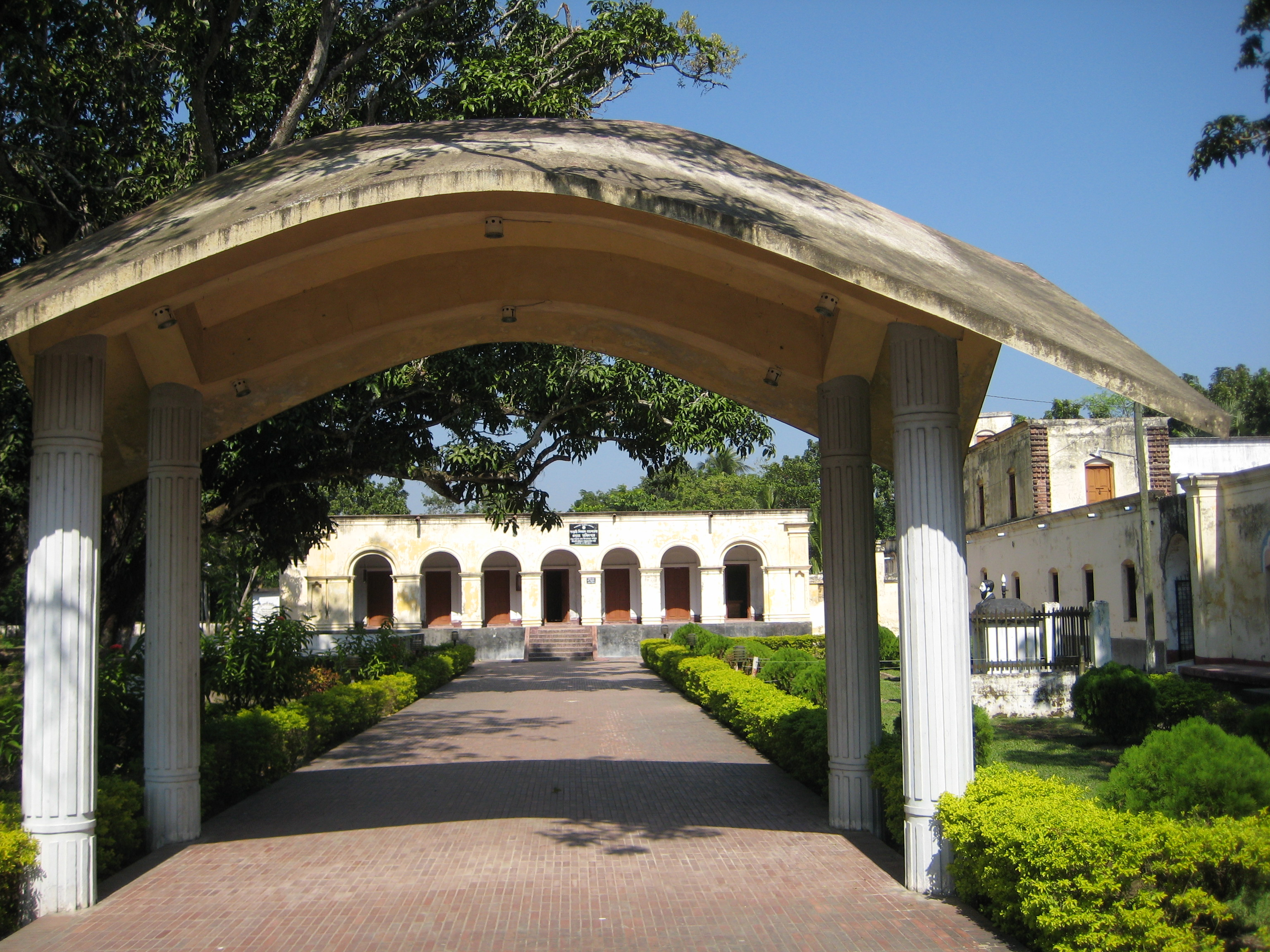
The main gate of the house of Michael Madhusudan Dutta at Sagardari village in Jessore. This house is currently being used as a museum.

- In Vaatnogor at Abhaynagar Upazila, ruins of eleven temple complex, dedicated to Shiva
- A terracotta plaque bearing the image of Mallinath, a female tirthankar (saint) of the Jain religion, was found at the Mound of Dam Dam Peer in Manirampur Upazila.
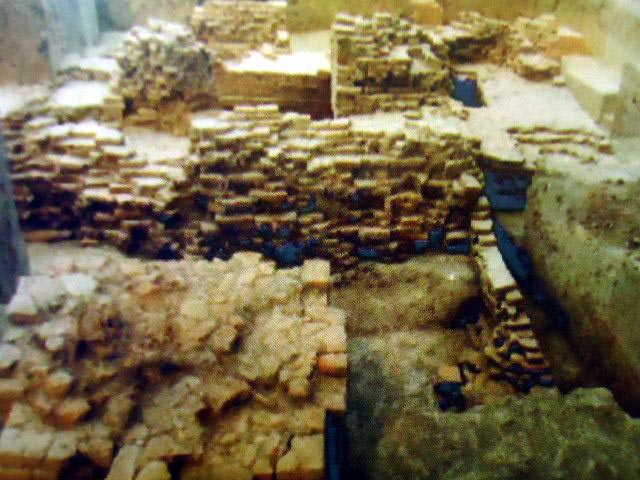
  Mound of Dam Dam Peer in Manirampur Upazila.
  It is believed to be the most ancient relic discovered from this part of the world. The Department at Khulna said that the plaque is at least 1800 years old. It is currently kept at the Khulna Museum.
- Gazir Dorgah
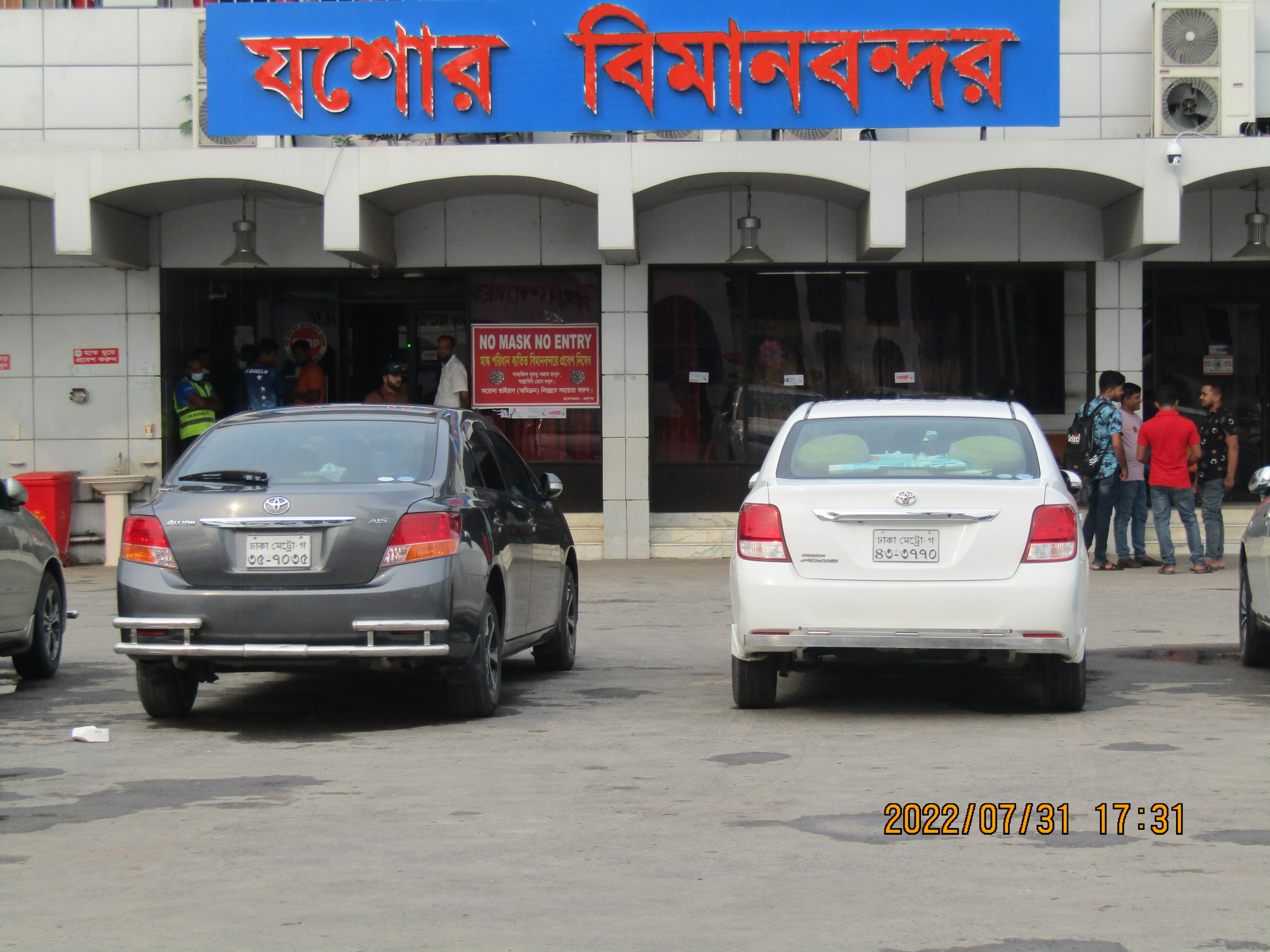
- The Front View of Jashore Airport
  Jessore Airport, Jessore Cantonment and Air Force Base Matiur Rahman
- Avaynogor's Khanjahan Ali Jame Mosque
- Jamidar Bari at Shridhorpur
- Konnadah Archajjo Baor at Sarsha
- Benapole Port
- Sonanodia Baor
- Fakhir Tika at Godkhali
- Shimulia Mission (Saheb Bari)
- Grave of Birshrestho Lance Nayek Noor Muhammad Sheikh
- Khatura Baor
- Moktarpur Lalu Babu Jamidar Bari
- Solo Khada Jamidar Bari

== Transport ==
Jessore has well connected road, rail and air transport links to other major cities and water transport links to Khulna and Mongla of Bangladesh. It boasts one of the first rail networks established in the Indian subcontinent.

=== Road ===
Jessore is located 183 km south west from Dhaka, the capital of Bangladesh by road and 60 km north from Khulna. It is also connected with the Indian city of Kolkata which is 120 km west through Benapole land port via AH1. The road from Jessore to Kolkata is a part of the historic Jessore Road.

=== Railway ===
Jessore Junction railway station is a major junction on the broad gauge-based network of the Western Railway. The network has links extended into Indian territory. Service linking the capital Dhaka and Kolkata April 2008. As well as in 2019, Both India And Bangladesh government agreed to 4 minute stop in Jessore Junction railway station through Bandhan Express which connect Khulna to Kolkata.

=== Air ===
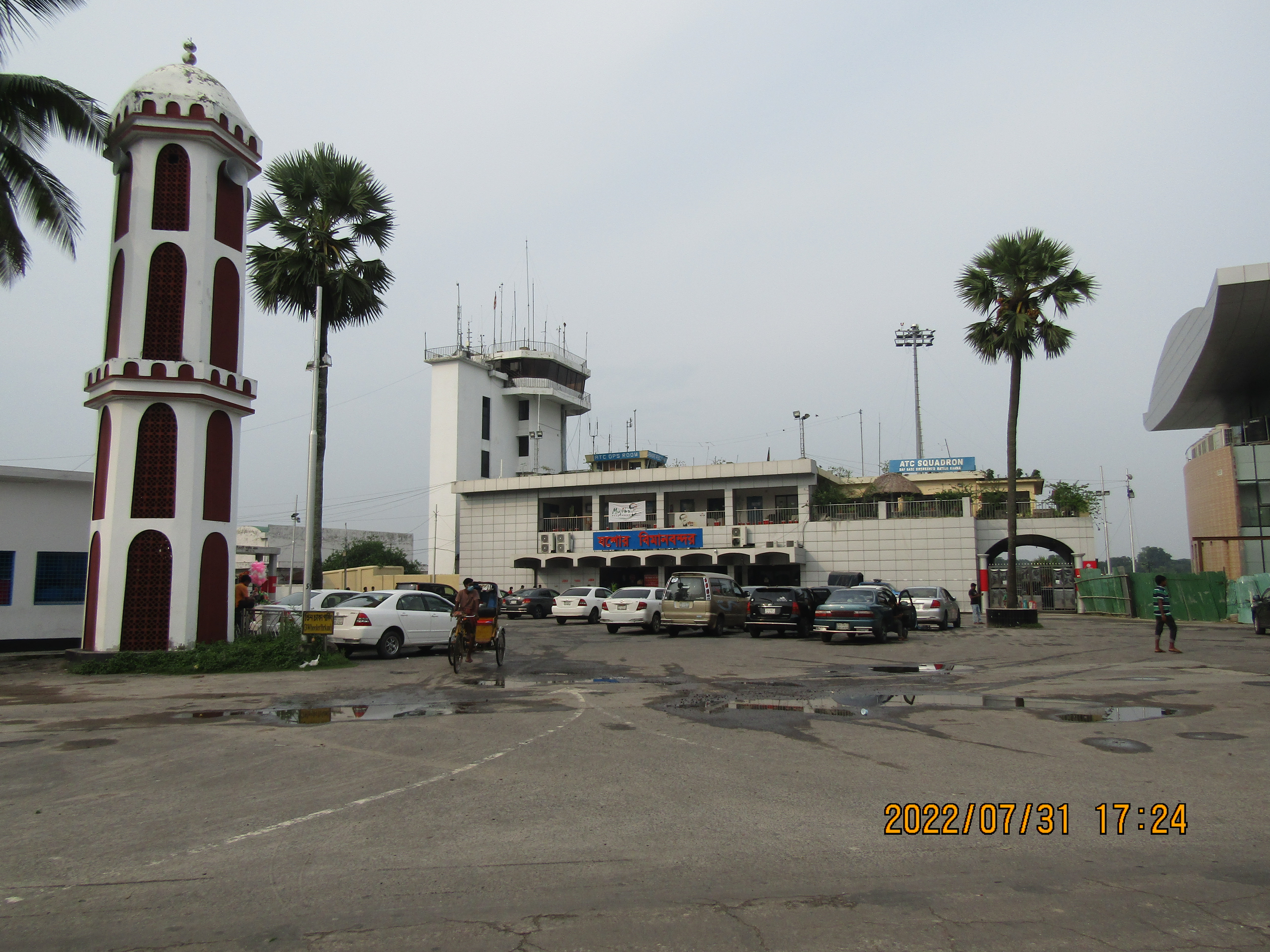
Jashore Airport

The Jessore Airport, near the city, is an airfield for the Bangladesh Air Force. One of the oldest airfield in Bangladesh and the subcontinent. Alongside military service, its runway caters to seven commercial flights daily which includes US Bangla, Novo and Biman Bangladesh Airlines, for domestic flights.

== Education ==
=== Universities ===
- Jashore University of Science and Technology

=== Medical colleges ===
- Jashore Medical College
- Army Medical College, Jashore

=== Colleges ===
There are 56 master's level, degree (honors), and degree (pass) colleges in the district:

- Michael Madhusudan College, Jashore
- A.B.C.D College
- Amdabad College Jessore
- Bagharpara Degree College
- Bagharpara Mohila College
- Bankra Degree College
- Benapol Degree College, Sharsha
- Bhabadaha Mahavidyalaya
- Bhoyrab Adarsha Mahabyddalya
- Cantonment College, Jessore
- Chowgacha Government College, Chowgacha, Jessore
- Chowgacha Mridhapara Mohila College, Chowgacha, Jessore
- Dr. Abdur Razzak Municipal College, Jessore
- Dr: Afil Uddin College
- Fazila Tunnesa Mohila Degree College
- Gabkhali Magura United College
- Ganganandapur Degree College, Jhikargacha
- Govt. Keshabpur College, Keshabpur
- Government Bir Shrestha Noor Mohammad College
- Hamidpur Al Hera College
- Hazi Abdul Motaleb Mahila College
- Hizaldanga Shahid Flight. Lt. Masud Memorial College
- Jessore College
- Jessore Government City College Jessore
- Jessore Government Mohila College, Jessore
- Jhikargacha Mohila Degree College, Jhikargacha
- Kapatackha Shammilani Degree College
- Kazi Nazrul Islam Degree College, Jessore
- Mashiahati Degree College, Jessore
- Mirjapur Adarsha Mohila Degree College Khajura
- Monirampur Government Degree College
- Monirampur Mahila Degree College
- Mukterswari Degree College
- Muktijoddha College, Rudrapur
- Naopara Model College
- Narikel Baria College
- Natun Hat Public College
- Navaran College
- Noapara Mohila College
- Noapara College, Abhaynagar
- Pakshia Ideal College, Sharsha
- Panjia Mahabiddalaya
- Rajganj Mohabiddalaya
- Rupdia Shaheed Smarity College
- S.M. Habibur Rahman Pouro College, Chowgacha
- Sammilani Degree College
- Shaheed Moshiur Rahman Degree College, Jhikargacha
- Shahid Sirajuddin Hossain Government College
- Shammalini Girls Degree College, Jhikargacha
- Shimulia Collage, Jhikargacha
- Singia Adarsha Degree College, Basundia
- Solua Adarsha Degree College
- Talbaria Degre College
- Upashahar Degree College, Jessore
- Upashahar Mohila Degree College, Jessore
- Vangura Adarsha Degree College
- Raghunath Nagar Mohabiddalaya

== Media ==
=== newspapers and magazines ===
List of daily newspapers

- Daily Runner
- Daily Noapara
- Daily Kalyan
- Daily Purobi
- Daily Deshitaishy (দৈনিক দেশহিতৈষী)
- Daily Sfulingo (দৈনিক স্ফুলিঙ্গ)
- Daily Jessore
- Daily Loksamaj
- Daily Gramer kagoj
- Daily Pravat Feri
- Daily Samajer Kagoj
- Daily Spandan
- Daily Gramer Kantha
- Daily Joruri Shangbad

List of weekly magazines

- Weekly Sonali Din
- Weekly Nawapara
- Weekly Banglalok
- Weekly Manabadhikar Sangbad
- Weekly Bojro kolom
- Weekly Sharsha Barta
- Weekly Prattohiki
- Weekly Ganomanos

List of Fortnightly

- Mot-Motantar

List of monthly magazines

- Monthly Ghumonter Dak
- Monthly Gramer Sangbad
- Monthly Photo Report

List of literary magazines

- Bangla Literature
- Ranoveree by Ahmad Ferdous

== Notable people ==
- Raushan Ali Bishwas (1921–1994), former Governor of Jessore
- Sanatana Goswami, sage, writer
- Rupa Goswami, Bengali poet, philosopher and writer
- Maharaja Pratapaditya, warrior, adhipati or ruler of Kingdom of Jessore
- Michael Madhusudan Datta, Bengali poet and playwright
- Manomohan Bose, Bengali poet, playwright and journalist
- Jnanadanandini Devi, Bengali writer, social reformer, pioneer in women's movement in India
- Prafulla Chandra Ray, Bengali chemist, philanthropist and otherwise known as father of modern chemical science in India
- Sisir Kumar Ghosh, founder of Amrita Bazar Patrika, fighter in Independence Struggle of India
- Kali Nath Roy, nationalist journalist and the chief editor of the newspaper, The Tribune
- Saroj Dutta, Indian political activist, poet, editor of Amrit Bazar Patrika
- Jadunath Majumdar, Rai Bahadur, journalist, writer, member of Bengal Legislative Assembly
- Nani Gopal Majumdar, Indian archaeologist
- P. C. Bose, fighter, labour activist and politician
- Kanak Mukherjee, political activist, women's movement pioneer in India
- Farida Akhtar, popularly known as Babita, Bangladeshi Film actress
- Dinesh Chandra Chattopadhyay, writer and editor
- Haridasa Thakur, Vaishnab saint, acarya of the Holy Name
- Jatin Bala, poet and Dalit author
- Ahmed Ali Enayetpuri, Islamic scholar, member of the Bengal Legislative Assembly
- Mashiur Rahman, politician of the Awami League
- Munshi Mohammad Meherullah, poet, Islamic scholar and social reformer
- Md Rabby Hossen Rahul, Bangladeshi footballer, Bangladesh football team
- Kowsar Ali, Bangladeshi footballer and field hockey player, Bangladesh football team and Bangladesh hockey team
- Syed Rasel, Bangladeshi cricketer, Bangladesh cricket team
- Iqbal Quadir, founder of Grameenphone
- M. Shamsher Ali, Bangladeshi astrophysicist
- Jiban Ratan Dhar, politician, army officer
- ASHK Sadek, former dducation minister of Bangladesh
- Mohammad Moniruzzaman, writer, poet, professor, fighter and lyricist
- Mohammad Rafiquzzaman, lyricist
- Paran Bandopadhyay, Indian film and television actor
- Mustafa Monwar, painter, sculptor, artist
- S. M. Imdadul Hoque, Bangladesh Army officer
- Champa, actress, model
- Kishori Mohan Bandyopadhyay, Bengali scientist, social worker and fighter
- Latifur Rahman, 10th Chief Justice of Bangladesh and the 2nd Chief Adviser of Bangladesh
- Harendranath Munshi, Indian independence activist
- Dilara Zaman, Bangladeshi Actress

== See also ==
- Khulna Division
- Divisions of Bangladesh
- Districts of Bangladesh
- Upazilas of Bangladesh
- Administrative geography of Bangladesh
