= Mohammad Sharif Husain =

Bangladeshi politician

Mohammad Sharif Husain was a Bangladeshi educationist, philanthropist, and a recipient of the Ekushey Padak.

== Early life ==
Husain was born on 1 January 1934 in Khorki, Jessore Town, Jessore District, East Bengal, British Raj. In 1949, he graduated from Jessore Zilla School. In 1953 he completed his B.A. from Michael Madhusudan College. In 1956, he completed his M.A. in the Department of Islamic History and Culture at the University of Dhaka.

== Career ==
Husain was part of the Bengali language movement from 1948 to 1952. From 1956 to 1967 he served as the Secretary of Awami League. He started a book fair in 1967 in Jessore. From 1962 to 1975, he was a lecturer at Michael Madhusudan College. In 1971, during the Bangladesh Liberation war he was arrested and sentenced to death by the Pakistan military.

He was released after the Independence of Bangladesh. From 1975 to 1983, he was a professor at Brajalal College. From 1963 to 1983, he was the secretary of the Jessore Institute Public Library. He collected books which he donated to the library. From 1989 to 1990, he was the Principal of Michael Madhusudan College, retiring in 1991.

=== Philanthropy ===
Husain founded a number of schools, Anjuman-e-khalequia orphanage, and Lillah Trust in Jessore. Anjuman-e-khalequia orphanage was built on his donated land. In 1994, he founded the nonprofit Sandipan. He founded a day care centre for domestic workers in Dhaka.

He also set up Ad-Din foundation in 1980 in Jessore District with Sheikh Akijuddin. The charity runs a hospital, women's medical college, orphanages, and social programs like HIV awareness.

He was awarded the Ekushey Padak by the government of Bangladesh for his philanthropic work.

== Death ==
He died on 4 February 2007.
