= Neera =

Palm nectar used as a drink

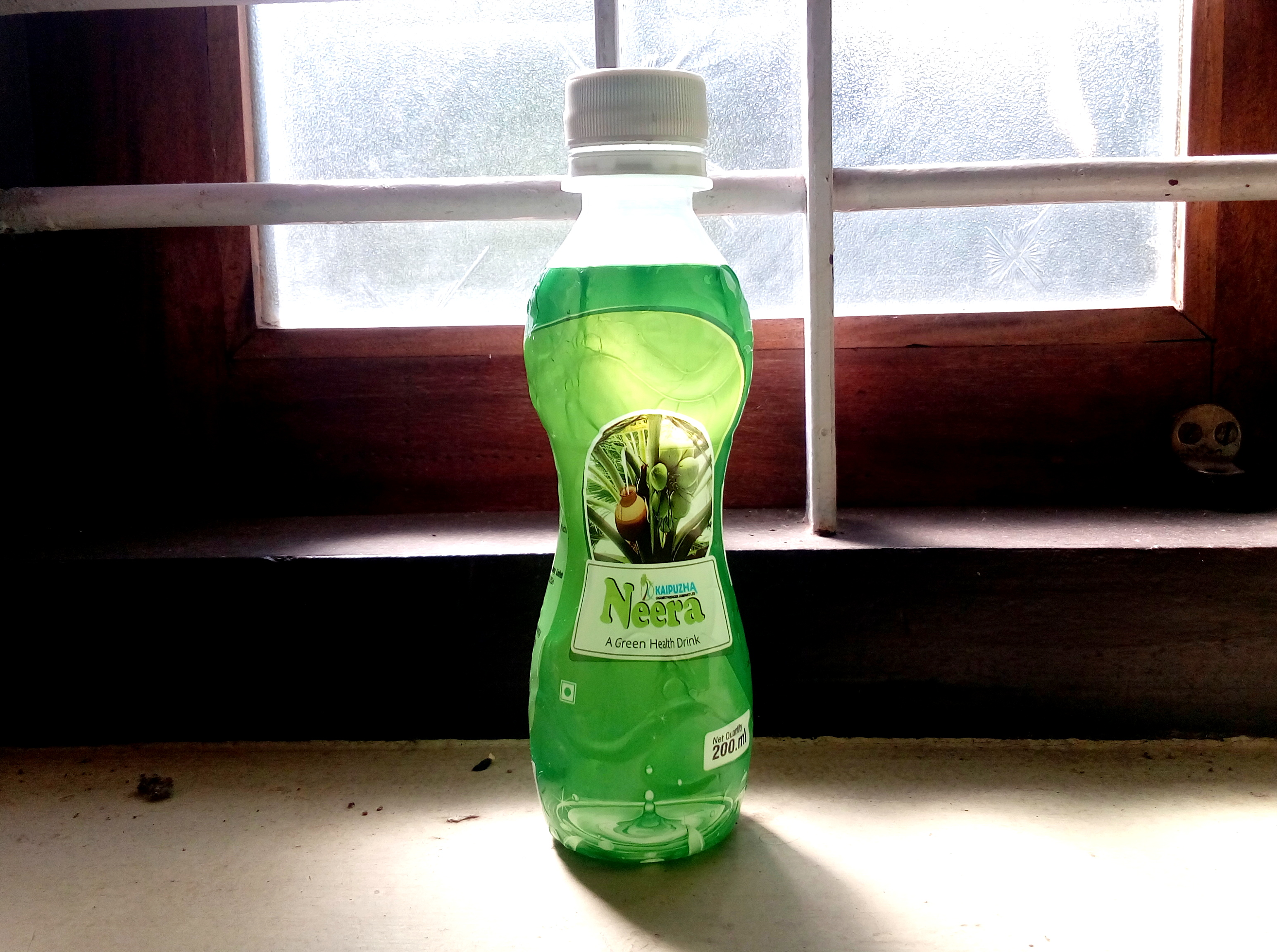
- Neera manufactured by the Kollam Kaipuzha Plant in 2016
- Ingredients: toddy palm

Neera, also called palm nectar, is a sap extracted from the inflorescence of various species of toddy palms and used as a drink. Neera extraction is generally performed before sunrise. It is sweet, translucent in colour. It is susceptible to natural fermentation at ambient temperature within a few hours of extraction, and is also known as palm wine. Once fermented, Neera becomes toddy. Neera is widely consumed in India, Sri Lanka, Africa, Malaysia, Indonesia, Thailand, and Myanmar. Neera is not the juice made from palm fruit.

Neera requires neither mechanical crushing, as in the case of sugarcane, nor leaching, like beet-root; it is obtained by slicing the spathes of the coconut, sago, and Palmyra (Borassus flabellifer L.) palm, and scraping the tendermost part, just below the crown.

In Goa though, the word surr is used for toddy of the coconut palm, and nirau for the sweet juice extracted last from the cashew apple. The words are not interchangeable.

== Composition ==
Neera is rich in carbohydrates, mildly alcoholic, mostly sucrose, and has a nearly neutral pH. It has a specific gravity ranging from 1.058 to 1.077. The chemical percentage composition of neera varies, depending on such factors as place, type of palm, mode and season of collection. Typical values are:

Substance	Concentration (g/100 mL)
Sucrose	12.3 – 17.4
Total ash	0.11 – 0.41
Protein	0.23 – 0.32
Ascorbic acid	0.016 – 0.030
Total solids	15.2 – 19.7

== Fermentation ==
Neera is highly susceptible to natural fermentation at ambient temperature within a few hours of extraction from the palm source. Once fermented, it transforms into toddy with 4% alcohol.

Using several technologies developed by various research institutes, neera is processed and preserved in its natural form to retain the vitamins, sugar, and other nutrients beneficial for health. To extend the shelf life of neera, heat preservation techniques such as pasteurization are used.

A team of experts from SCMS Institute of BioSciences and Biotechnology, Cochin, India have successfully developed filtration and preservation techniques for neera and collaborated with Coconut Development Board to commercialize the drink among the public.

A special filtration technique to enhance the shelf life of neera was developed by the National Chemical Laboratory in Pune, India. Technologies for the preservation and processing of neera were also developed by the Central Food Technological Research Institute in Mysore, India.

== By-products ==
Palmgur (jaggery), palm sugar, coconut nectar and neera syrup are produced by heating fresh neera and concentrating it. Caramelization turns the heated neera from milky white to transparent brown.

West Bengal and Orissa are the Indian states where most of the neera is converted into palmgur. Palmgur is also produced from neera in the states of Gujarat and Maharashtra.

== In India ==
- In Gujarat, Neera-producing societies have formed the Federation of Gujarat Neera And Tadpadarth Gramodyog Sangh. This organisation has set up a filtration plant that processes Neera to increase its shelf life. The Gujarat Neera and Tadpadarth Gramodyog Sangh, established in 1991, aims to improve living conditions of the workers engaged in the production of Neera. It is also trying to increase the production of neera in the state by planting more palm trees, and investing in the training of tapper-workers.
- In Andhra Pradesh, unlike other states, there is no state government sponsorship/support to promote neera or its by-products at retail outlets. Only the Khadi and Village Industries Commission (KVIC) promotes neera as a health drink.
- In Gujarat and Maharashtra, neera is made available through various outlets known as "Neera Vikri Kendra" (Neera sale centre). The Neera Palm Product Cooperative Society had set up small green kiosks that sold neera in major railway stations, but they are now only to be found alongside highways and expressways outside the Mumbai city area. In the above two states the neera is extracted from date palm and pulmyrah trees. In the state of Karnataka, where there are abundant coconut trees, neera is tapped from coconut trees .
- In Karnataka, neera is extracted and sold by the Ediga and Billava castes. The state government constituted the Neera Board, comprising farmers, provincial government officials, and neera training institutes, to inspect and control the quality of neera and its products, give approvals to labels, and develop various schemes for selling in the international market. The Central Food Technological Research Institute developed a technology to preserve neera for two months, and the government plans to promote neera as an energy drink with medicinal value, packaged in sachets and bottles.
- In Kerala, the state government, as part of Kerala Vision 2010, set up three units to manufacture neera.
- In Odisha, the state government established a cooperative organisation known as the Odisha State Palmgur Cooperative Federation to provide technological support in the processing and production of neera and its associated by-products such as jaggery and candy.
- In Tamil Nadu, Neera is also called "Padaneer" in Tamil. KVIC and Tamil Nadu Palm Products Development Board sell refrigerated Padaneer at their outlets.
- Neera syrup is used as a drink in Ayurveda.
- In recent years preserved and packaged versions of Neera have been commercialised and made available in cafes and retail outlets in several Indian cities.

== See also ==
- Palm wine
- Coconut sugar
