= Coconut flower nectar =

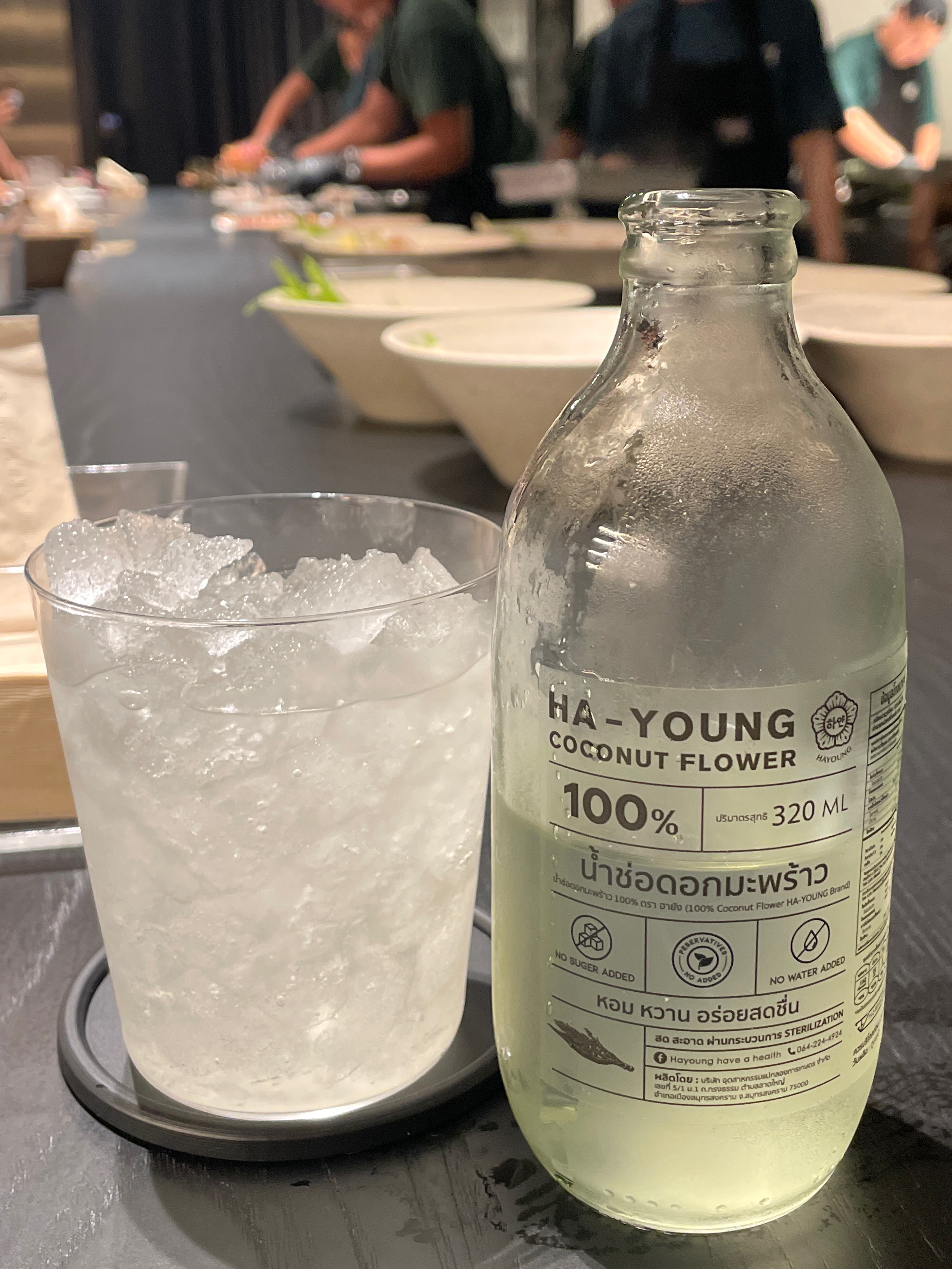
Organic coconut flower juice from Samut Songkhram province, Thailand

Coconut flower nectar or coconut flower juice is the clear liquid extracted from the sap of coconut flower stems. It can be drunk raw or processed into a spirit.

== History ==
The harvesting of coconut flower nectar ( Thai: น้ำหวานดอกมะพร้าว) a longstanding agricultural practice in some countries in Southeast Asia such as Vietnam and Thailand. In Vietnam, the process had largely followed out of practice with agricultural advancements. Members of the community in Tra Vinh are reviving the practice, as saltwater intrusion into the Mekong Delta has forced farmers to turn away from harvesting the coconuts themselves.

== Thailand ==
In Thailand, coconut flower nectar (Thai: น้ำหวานดอกมะพร้าว, RTGS: nam wan dok maphrao) is primarily harvested from palm sugar trees in the country's central plains region, including Samut Songkhram province. The nectar can be drank raw and fermented and distilled into an alcohol known as "drunken sugar" (Thai: น้ำตาลเมา, RTGS: nam tan mao).

Onson (Thai: ออนชอน), founded by Tammawit "Tiger" Limlertcharoenwanich, is a distillery based in Sakon Nakhon province in Isaan, which produces a spirit from the nectar. In 2022, then Move Forward Party leader Pita Limjaroenrat listed Onson as one of his favorite Thai spirits.
