= Mukteshwari River =

River in Bangladesh

Coordinates: 23.0754°N 89.2708°E

Mukteshwari River is a river located in Bangladesh. Originating in Jessore District, it is one of the seven main rivers of the district.

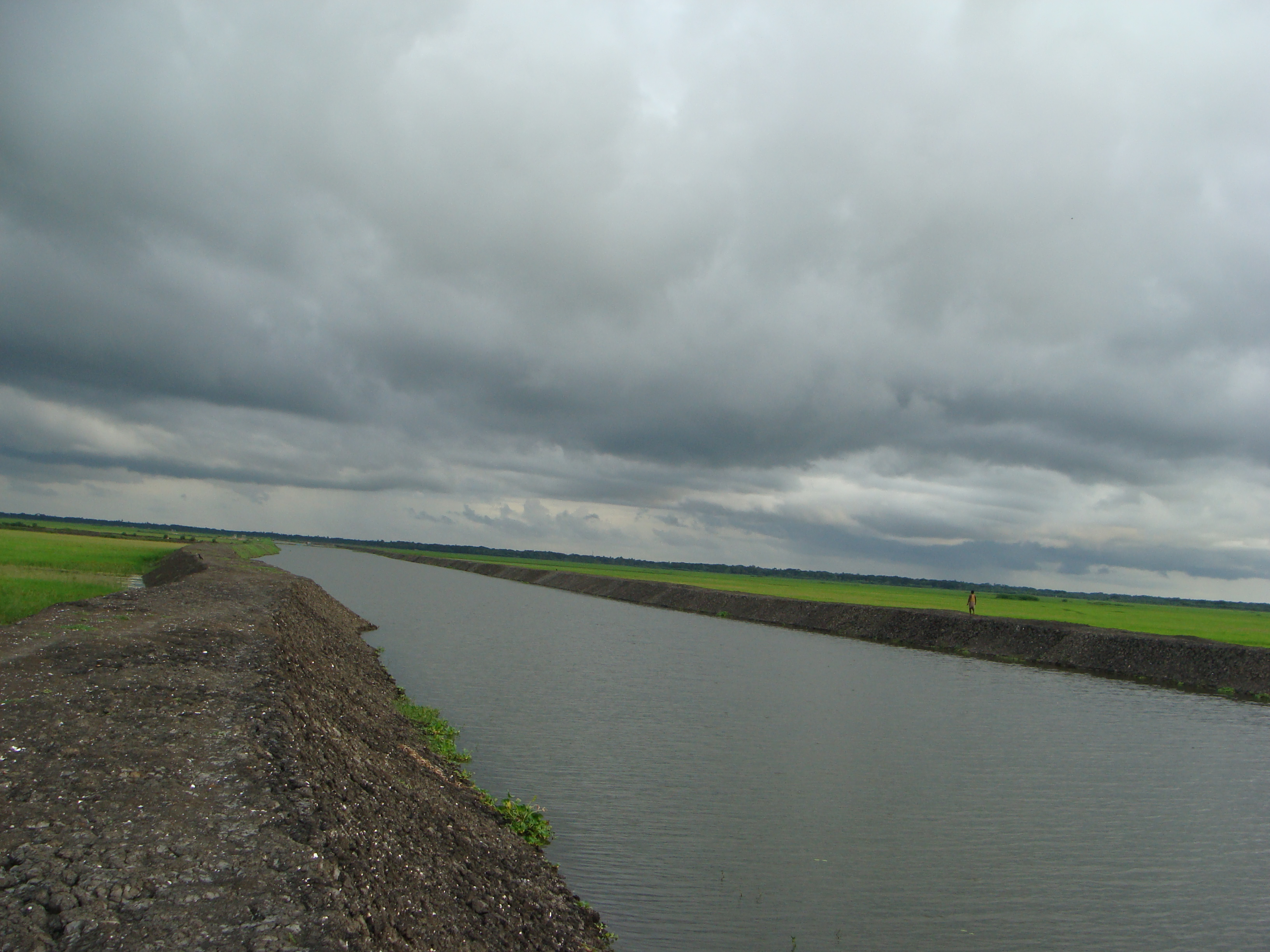
Mukteshwari River, Avaynagar, jessore, Bangladesh - panoramio
