= Coconut sugar =

Sugar produced from the coconut palm

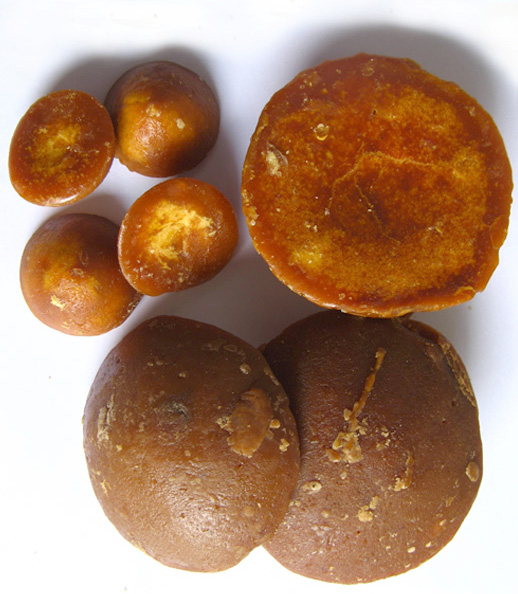
Brown coconut sugar

Coconut sugar (also known as coco sugar, coconut palm sugar, coco sap sugar or coconut blossom sugar) is a palm sugar produced from the sap of the flower bud stem of the coconut palm.

Other types of palm sugar are made from the kithul palm (Caryota urens), Palmyra palm, the date palm, the sugar date palm, the sago palm or the sugar palm.

Used as a sweetener in many countries, coconut sugar has no significant nutritional or health benefits over other sweeteners.

== Manufacture ==
Coconut sugar comes in crystal or granule form, block or liquid.

Producing coconut sugar is a two-step process. It starts with harvesting or "tapping" nectar from the flower bud stem of a coconut tree. Farmers make a cut on the spadix and the sap starts to flow from the cut into bamboo containers. The sap collected is then transferred into large woks and placed over moderate heat to evaporate the moisture content of the sap. The sap is translucent and is about 80% water. At this point, it is known as coconut neera or nira (Indonesia), tinamís (Philippines), coconut toddy (Sri Lanka), namwan maphrao (Thailand), or lagbi (North Africa). As the water evaporates, it starts to transform into a thick sap syrup. From this form, it may or may not be further reduced to crystal, block or soft paste form.

The brown colour which develops as the sap is reduced is mostly due to caramelization.

== Culinary use ==
Coconut sugar is widely used in Sri Lanka as an unrefined syrup or as jaggery, referred to as pol hakuru (පොල් හකුරු), though the jaggery made from the Kithul palm is preferred.

In Indonesian cuisine coconut sugar is called gula jawa (Javanese sugar) or gula merah (red sugar), while gula aren refers to palm sugar specifically made from aren palm. Some Indonesian foodstuffs are made with coconut sugar, including kecap manis (a sweet soya sauce) and dendeng (a meat preparation).

Gula melaka is a Southeast Asian name for palm sugar or "malacca sugar", probably named for its origin in the state of Malacca, Malaysia. It is usually derived from coconut palms, but sometimes from other palms. It is used in savory dishes, but mainly in local desserts and cakes of the Southeast Asian region.

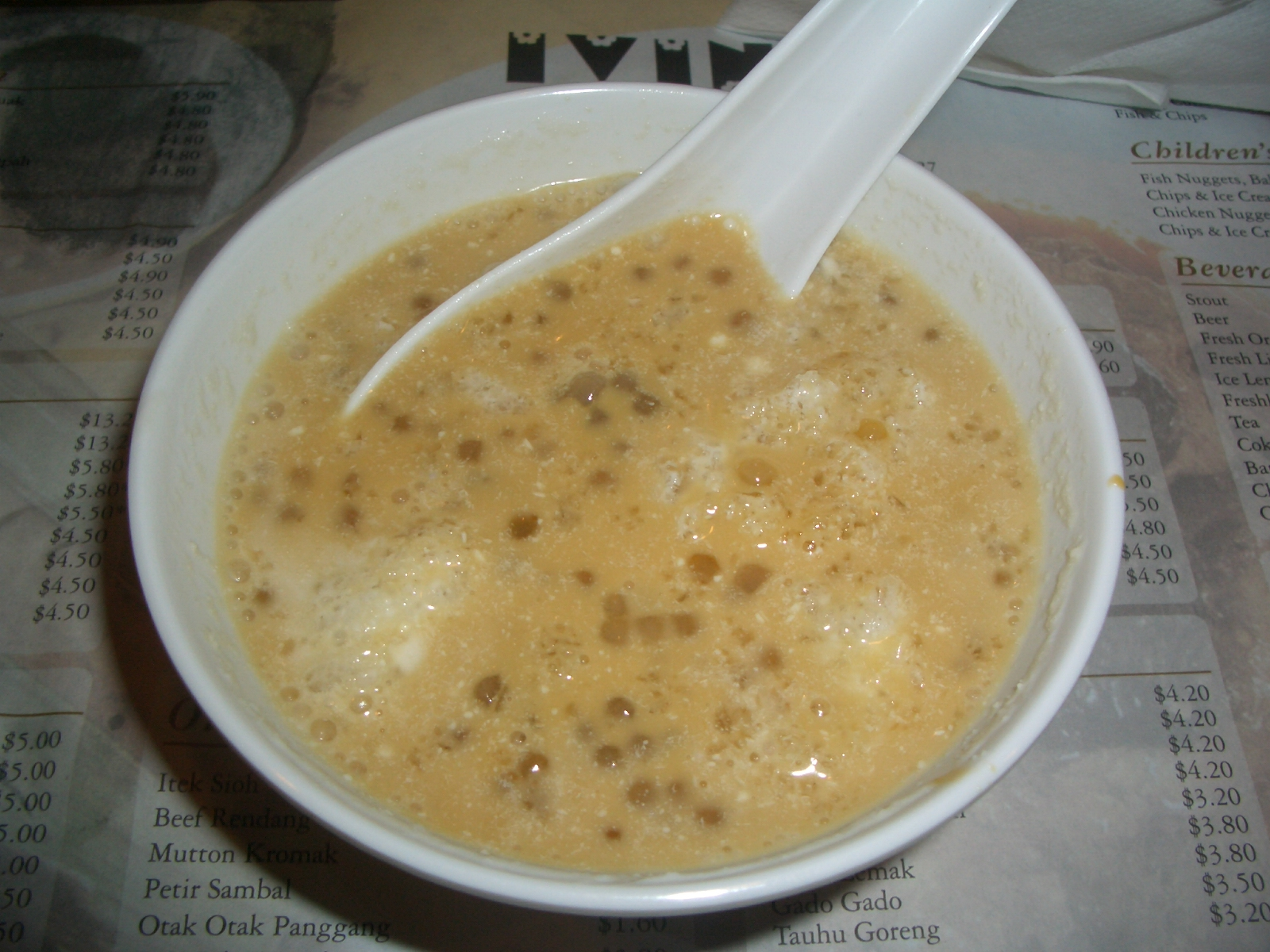
A bowl of gula melaka sago

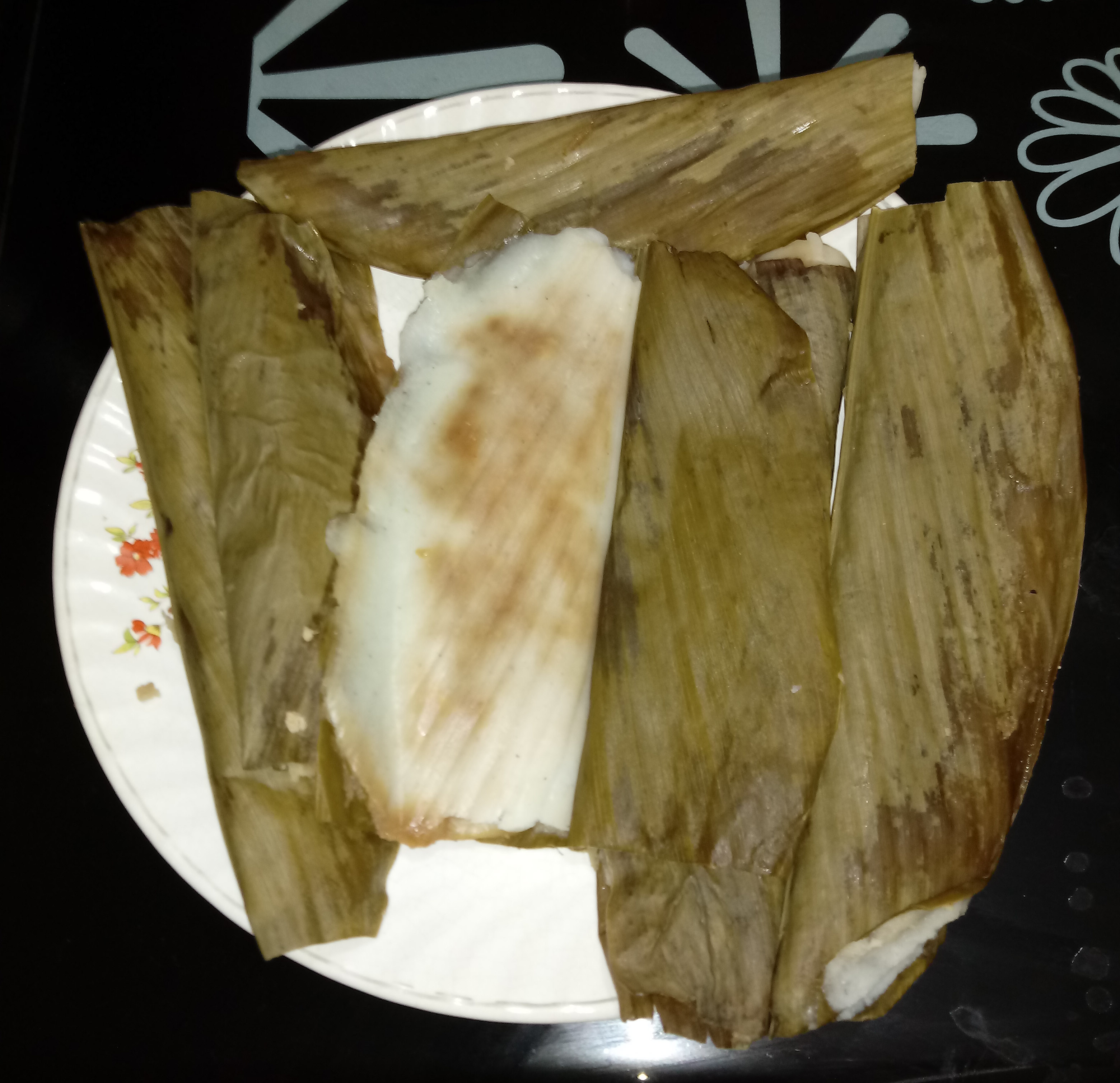
Patoleo, a Goan Catholic sweet dish prepared with coconut sugar

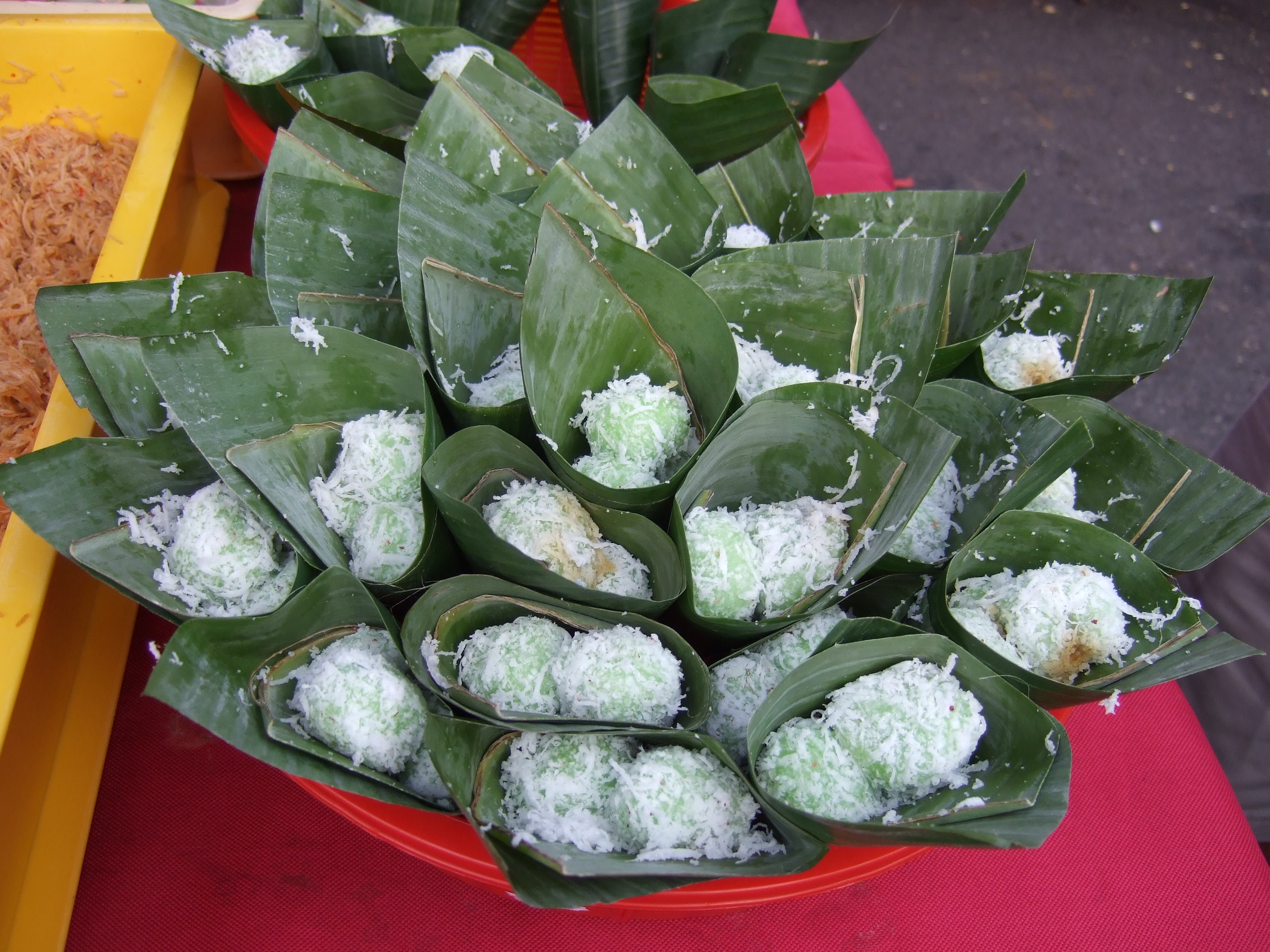
Klepon; the green flecks within the rice derive from glutinous rice flour mixed with sweet potato and flavored with pandan.

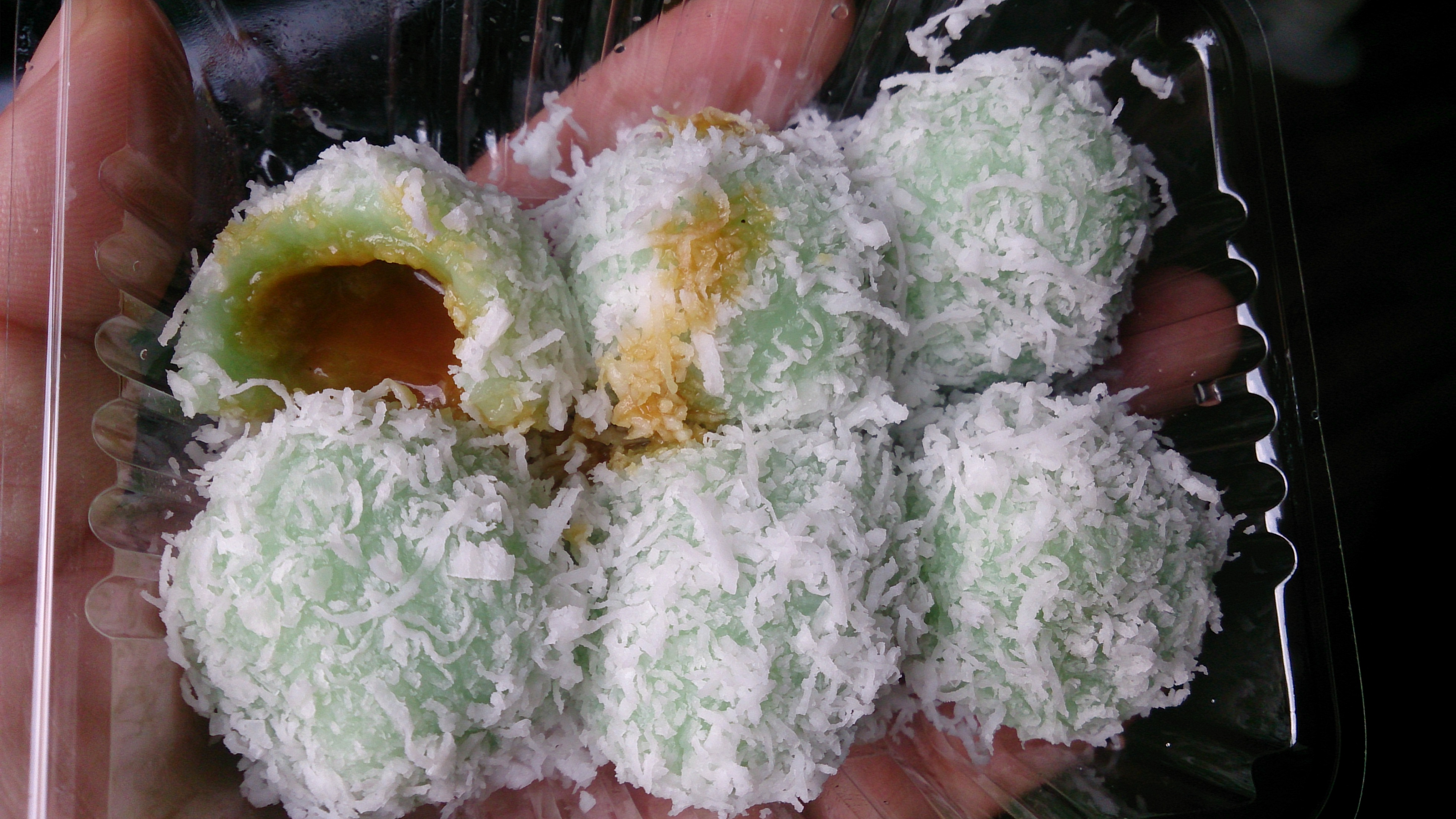
Klepon, with palm sugar filling

== Taste and flavor ==
Coconut sugar is subtly sweet almost like brown sugar but with a slight hint of caramel. The flavor and sweetness is usually similar to table sugar or brown sugar. However, since coconut sugar is not highly processed, the color, sweetness and flavor can vary depending on the coconut species used, season when it was harvested, where it was harvested and/or the way the "sap" or "toddy" was reduced.

== Nutrition and health claims ==
Although its use as a sweetener has become more common in developed countries, there is no scientific evidence that coconut sugar is more nutritious or healthier than any other sweetener. The nutritive value is similar to the empty calories found in table sugar or brown sugar. The principal carbohydrates of coconut sugar are sucrose (70–79%), glucose, and fructose (3–9% each). Coconut sugar also contains mannose, inositol and amino acids. Presumably due to the heat during cooking, it further contains pyroglutamate in comparatively high concentrations.

A glycemic index (GI) of 35 for coconut sugar was reported by the Philippine Coconut Authority, and by that measure it is classified as a low glycemic index food. However, the University of Sydney (Australia) Glycemic Index Research Service measured the GI of coconut sugar to be 54, and considers any GI over 55 to be high.

== See also ==
- Jaggery, a form of brown sugar, is sometimes made from coconut sugar
