= Kowsar Ali =

Bangladeshi former footballer and field hockey player

Mohammad Kowsar Ali
- Born: 20 November 1958 (age 67); Jessore, East Pakistan (present-day Bangladesh)
- Height: 1.75 m (5 ft 9 in)
Association football career
- Position: Midfielder
Senior career*
Years	Team	Apps	(Gls)
1975–1976	Wari		
1977	Mohammedan		
1978–1982	BJMC		
1983–1984	Wari		
International career
1977–1978	Bangladesh U19		
1978–1980	Bangladesh		
Managerial career
- 1986–1987: Wari Club
- * Club domestic league appearances and goals
- Field hockey career
- Sport: Field hockey
- Position: Forward
Senior career
Years	Team	Caps	Goals
1974–1980	Wari	-	-
1981	Sonali Bank	-	-
1982	Sadharan Bima	-	-
1983–1985	Wari	-	-
National team
Years	Team	Caps	Goals
1977	Bangladesh	3	(0)
Coaching career
- 1985: Wari
- 1986–2017: BKSP
- 1995: Bangladesh Navy
- 1996–1997: Dhaka Abahani
- 2003: Mohammedan
- 2004–2005: Azad
- 2005: Myanmar U21
- 2010: Dhaka Abahani
- 2014: Bangladesh U16

Kowsar Ali (Bengali: কাওসার আলী; born 20 November 1958) is a former Bangladeshi national football and hockey player and coach.

== Early life ==
Kowsar Ali is a graduate from Jashore Zilla School.

== Career ==
=== Football ===
Ali began his football career with the Jessore District team in 1974 and continued to represent the team for twelve consecutive years, helping them win the National Football Championship in 1976. He debuted in the Dhaka First Division League with Wari Club in 1975. He later joined Bangladesh's biggest club at the time, Mohammedan SC in 1977.

After representing Bangladesh U19 in the 1977 and 1978 editions of the AFC Youth Championship, he was included in the senior national squad for the 1978 Asian Games, in Bangkok. In the following year, he was part of the team which finished group runners-up in the 1980 AFC Asian Cup qualifiers on home soil to qualify for the 1980 AFC Asian Cup in Kuwait. In the main tournament he made his only appearance as a substitute against Iran during a 7–0 defeat.

Ali enjoyed his most successful year in 1979, as he helped Team BJMC lift the First Division title. During the season, his midfield partnership with Milon Karmakar Basu was heavily applauded as one of the main factors in the club's success. He eventually served as the football and hockey coach of Wari Club from 1985 to 1987 following his retirement.

=== Hockey ===
Ali represented Dhaka University in the National Hockey Championship under its sports quota from 1977 to 1979. He previously began his hockey career alongside football in 1974 with the Jessore District team. In 1977 he played for the Bangladesh national field hockey team during three test matches against visiting Sri Lanka. Ali was also a runner-up in the National Championship with Jessore in 1982. In the domestic league, he represented three runner-up Wari Club teams in the First Division Hockey League.

In 1986, he joined BKSP as a hockey coach, during which he also served as the coach of Dhaka District and Patuakhali District various times in the National Hockey Championship. He won the National Championship a total of eighteen times as a coach and later served as the head coach of the entire BKSP hockey division.

In domestic hockey, he found success with both Mohammedan and Abahani Limited, winning the 2010 Dhaka Premier Division Hockey League with the latter. In 2005, he served as the head coach of the Myanmar national under-21 hockey team for two months. Under his guidance, the Bangladesh youth national team qualified for the 2014 Summer Youth Olympics, and previously, his BKSP team lifted India's prestigious Nehru Hockey tournament title in 2005.

Ali was also a member of the Bangladesh Hockey Federation in 2013. He served as a member of the federation's development committee, a coaches course coordinator, and the president of the coaching committee. In addition to this, Ali has served as a member of the development and education committee and as part of the governance panel of the Asian Hockey Federation. On 19 November 2017, he concluded his 31-year-long career as the chief hockey coach of BKSP.

== Honours ==
=== Football player ===
Jessore District

- Sher-e-Bangla Cup: 1976

Team BJMC

- Dhaka First Division Football League: 1979

=== Hockey coach ===
Bangladesh Navy

- Inter-Service Hockey Tournament: 1995

Mohammedan SC

- Hockey Club Cup: 2003

Abahani Limited Dhaka

- Dhaka Premier Division Hockey League : 2010
