= Onson Distillery =

- Native name: โรงกลั่นออนซอน
- Company type: Private
- Founded: 2020
- Founder: Tammawit "Tiger" Limlertcharoenwanich
- Headquarters: Sakon Nakhon, Thailand

Onson Distillery (Thai: โรงกลั่นออนซอน) is a Thai distillery in Sakon Nakhon province founded in 2020 by Tammawit "Tiger" Limlertcharoenwanich (Thai: ธรรมวิทย์ "เสือ" ลิ้มเลิศเจริญวนิช). The distillery products lao khao from coconut flower nectar. Tammawit sources the coconut flower nectar from a floating market near Bangkok.

== History ==
Onson possesses a "community" distillery license, which restricts the company to six employees, and up to five horsepower of electricity. Following the introduction of medium-sized distillery recognition by the Thai government, which increased power limits to 50 horsepower and allowing up to 50 employees, Onson applied for the new license.

Tammawit has become an advocate for liberalizing Thailand's liquor laws, and supportive of the Community Liquor Act.

In 2022, then Move Forward Party leader Pita Limjaroenrat listed Onson as one of his favorite Thai spirits.
