= Chanchara =

Coordinates: 13°3′0″S 74°16′0″W

Chanchara is a town in Peru, it is located at 13°3'0S 74°16'0W and has an altitude of 2734 metres (8973 feet).
