= Mashiur Rahman (politician, born 1920) =

- In office 1956 – 1958
- Leader: Ataur Rahman Khan

Personal details
- Born: c. 1920 Jessore, Bengal Presidency, British India
- Died: 25 March 1971 (aged 50–51) Jessore, East Pakistan, Pakistan
- Party: Bangladesh Awami League
- Other political affiliations: United Front (East Bengal)
- Education: University of Calcutta

Mashiur Rahman (1920–1971) was a Bangladeshi lawyer and politician, a member of the East Bengal Legislative Assembly and cabinet minister in the East Pakistan government of Ataur Rahman Khan. He was instrumental in the founding of the Bangladesh Awami League and in the Bengali language movement, and supported Sheikh Mujibur Rahman.

== Early life ==
Mashiur Rahman was born in village of Singhajhuli in Chaugachha upazila, Jessore district in 1920. He graduated in 1938 from Jessore Zilla School and went on to Calcutta Islamia College. He finish his BL in 1944 in Calcutta University. In 1944 he joined Jessore district bar in 1944. He joined the Muslim League.

== Career ==
In 1948 he was elected chairman of Jessore Zila Board, he resigned the same year to protest the Muslims leagues state language policy. He joined the Awami Muslim League in 1948. In 1952 he was elected general secretary of the Jessore district unit of Awami Muslim League. From 1948 to 1952 he was involved in the Bengali Language Movement in Jessore. For which he was imprisoned. In 1954 he was elected to the East Bengal Legislative Assembly, from the United Front.

In 1956 he was a minister in the cabinet of Ataur Rahman Khan. He was the Minister of Publicity, Parliamentary Affairs, Revenue and Local Government. He was arrested again in 1958 when martial law was declared. He was on the legal team of Sheikh Mujibur Rahman in Agartala conspiracy case. However, in 1967, when Awami League got split into two groups, he became the vice-president of the Pro-PDM faction of Awami League, which was against the Six-point demand of Sheikh Mujibur Rahman.

Mashiur Rahman returned to the mainstream Awami League in 1968. He was elected to the Pakistan National Assembly in 1970 from Jessore-3 constituency. During March 1971 he was involved in the non cooperation movement.

== Death ==
He was kidnapped by the Pakistani army on the night of 25 March 1971 and murdered a month later. Sheikh Mujib inaugurated a monument to him in Jessore Municipal park on 26 December 1972.
