= Corn sugar =

Corn sugar may refer to:

- Glucose (dextrose monohydrate) produced from corn starch
- The name for high-fructose corn syrup proposed by the Corn Refiners Association, and ultimately rejected by the FDA.
