= Date sugar =

Sugar extracted from dates

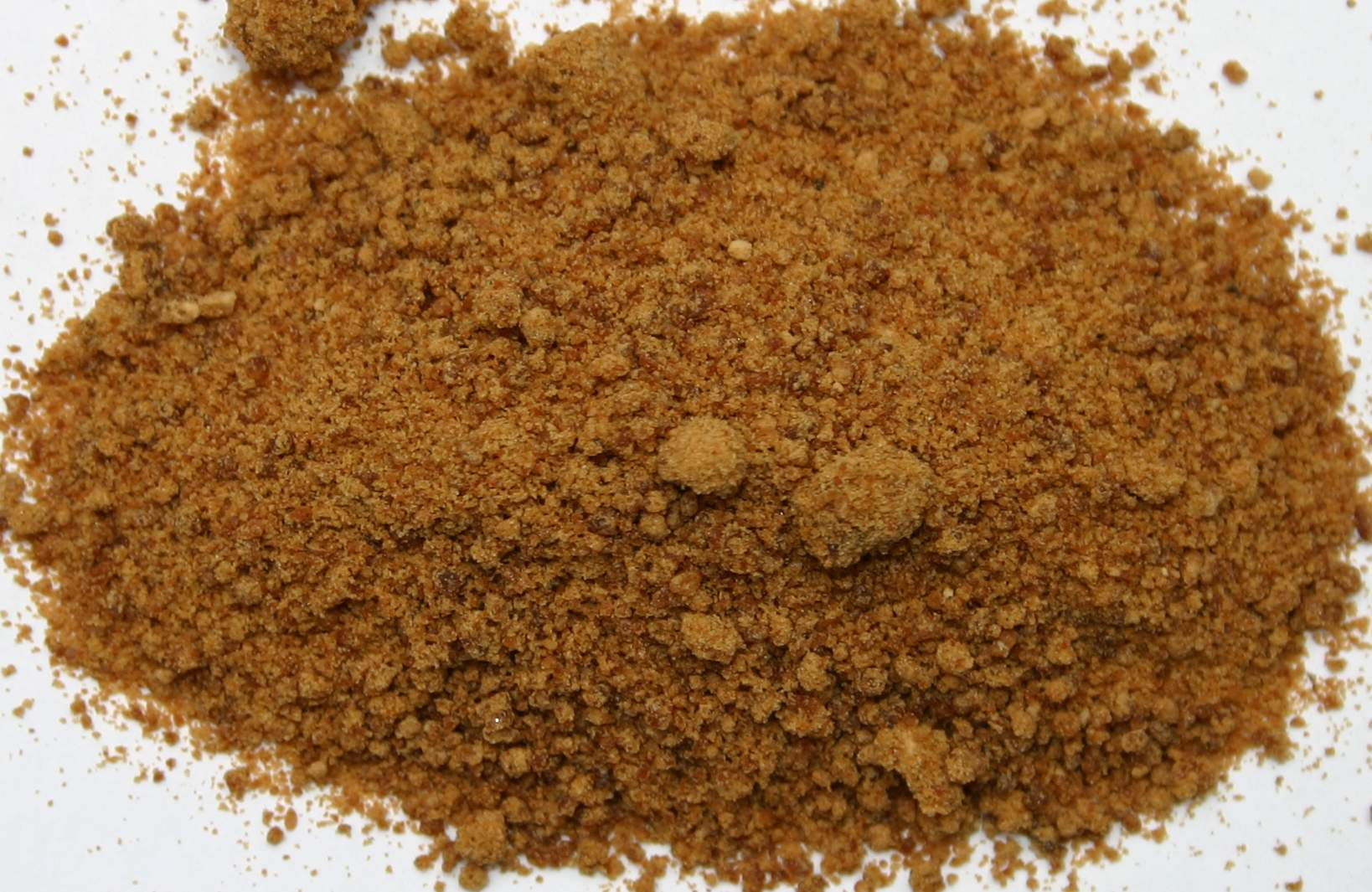
Whole date sugar

Date sugar is a type of sugar made from dried dates. It is found most commonly in natural food stores since it is less processed than more conventional sugars, and adds a rich sweetness to recipes, although it will not dissolve when added to drinks. It also does not melt like granulated sugar which can limit its use. It is sometimes promoted as a healthier alternative to brown sugar, although it can be quite expensive. Date sugar is derived from the whole date fruit; therefore can be called a whole food. The sugar content of a date consists of equal parts fructose and glucose (two common monosaccharides), with the remainder made up of sucrose.

Date sugar should not be confused with date palm sugar, also called palm sugar, as this is made from the sap of the sugar palm tree, including date trees. Date sugar can be substituted in many foods and beverages.

== Production ==
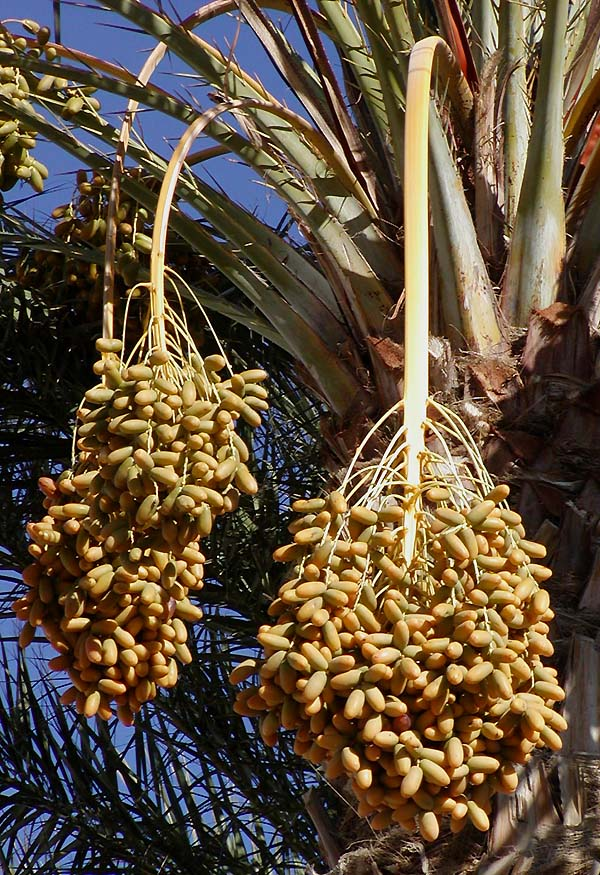
Dates on a date palm

Date powder is made by first making a paste from raw dates. Then, the paste is mixed with a substance called maltodextrin (a common food additive). This mixture is oven dried and ground into granules. The proportion of maltodextrin to date paste determines the properties of the sugar. There are many recipes for making date sugar at home, but it can also be purchased. There are many methods looking to automate the process of date sugar production.

Dates have a few stages of development: khalaal, rutab, and tamr. The best dates to make into date sugar are tamr dates, as they have a very low moisture content (about 30%) and are very sweet. Studies are currently in progress on how best to determine sugar content of a date. This could help identify the best dates to use for date sugar.
