= Palm sugar =

Sugar extracted from the sap of palm trees

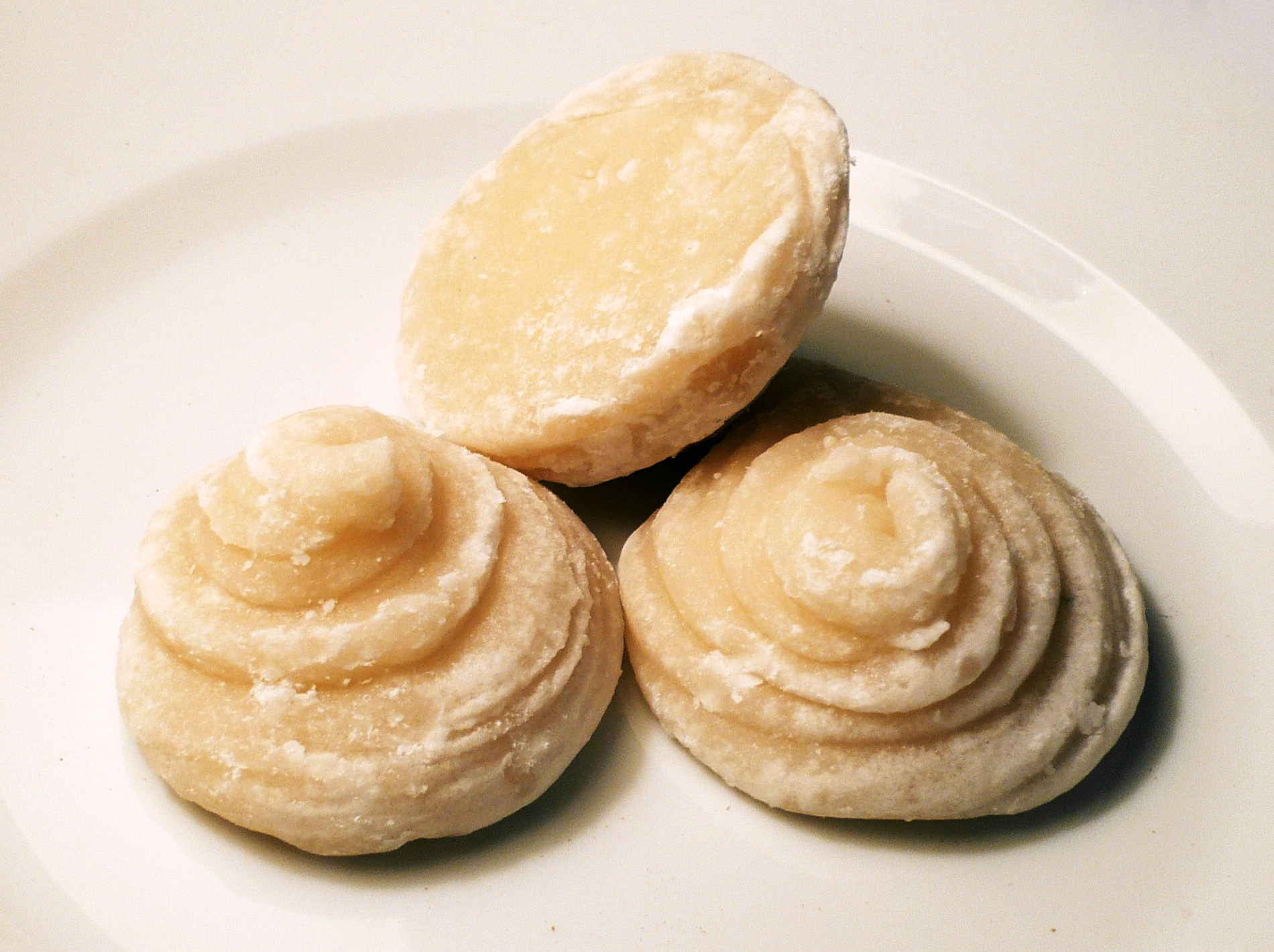
Three cakes of commercially produced palm sugar

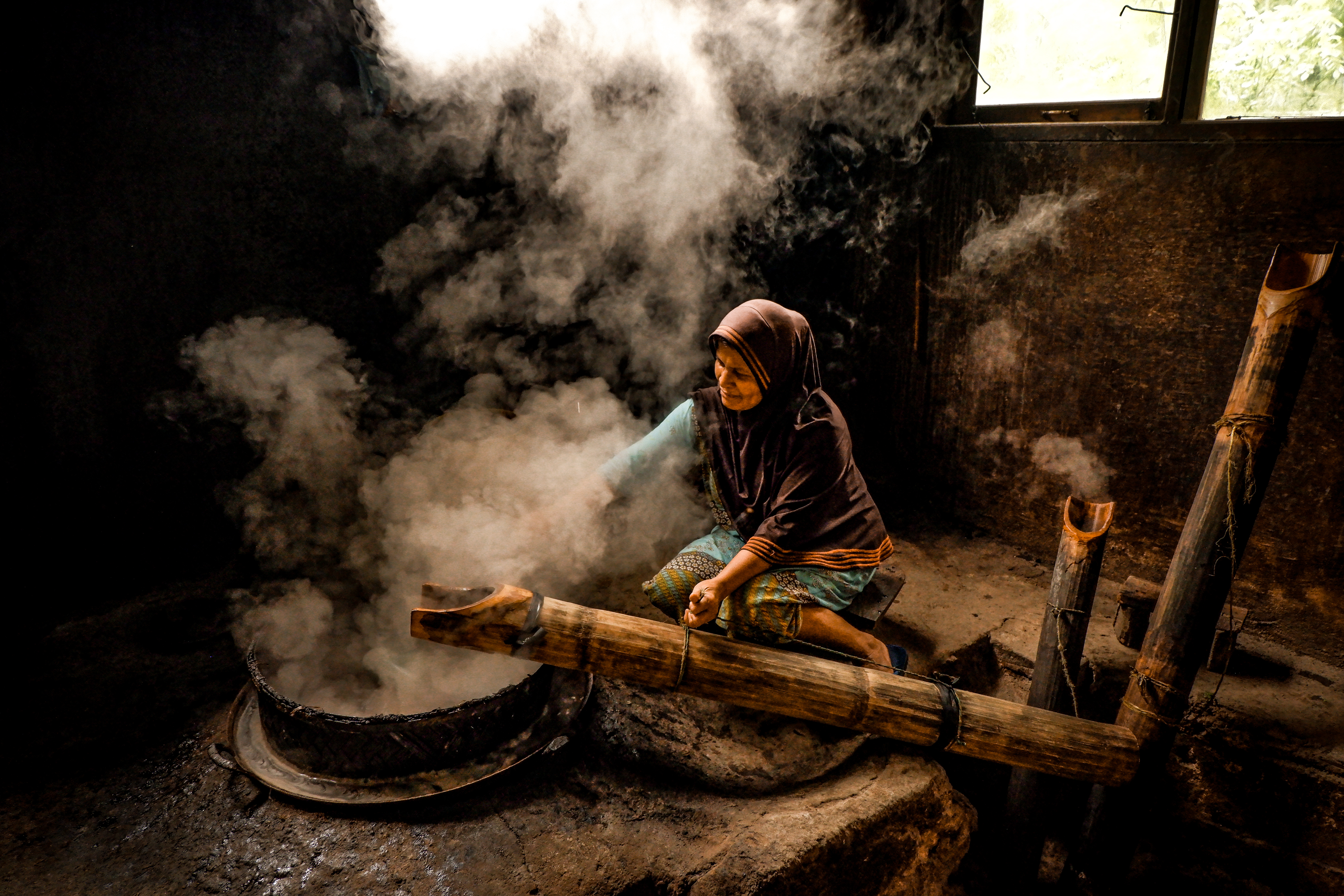
Boiling palm sap to make traditional palm sugar in a village in West Sumatra, Indonesia

Palm sugar is a sweetener derived from any variety of palm tree. Palm sugar may be qualified by the type of palm, as in coconut palm sugar. While sugars from different palms may have slightly different compositions, all are processed similarly and can be used interchangeably.

== Types ==
The predominant sources of palm sugar are the Palmyra, date, nipa, aren, and coconut palms.

The Palmyra palm (Borassus spp.) is grown in Africa, Asia, and New Guinea. The tree has many uses, such as thatching, hatmaking, timber, and writing material, and in food products. Palm sugar is produced from sap (toddy) from the flowers.

There are two species of date palm that produce palm sugar: Phoenix dactylifera and P. sylvestris. P. dactylifera is common in the Mediterranean and Middle East, while P. sylvestris is native to Asia, mainly Pakistan and India. Date palms are cultivated mainly for dates and palm sugar is made from the tree's sap.

The nipa palm (Nypa fruticans) is native to the coastlines and tropical regions of the Indian and Pacific Oceans. It is the only palm tree that grows in a watery mangrove biome. Only its leaves and flowers are able to grow above water. Palm sugar is made from the sugar-rich sap.

The sugar palm (Arenga pinnata) is native to the coastal and tropical regions of Asia, mainly China, Malaysia, and Indonesia. The sap used to produce palm sugar is known in India as gur and in Indonesia as gula aren.

The coconut palm' (Cocos nucifera) yields coconut palm sugar from the sap of its flowers. It grows in coastal areas of the Indian and Pacific Oceans. Major suppliers are Thailand, Indonesia, and the Philippines.

== Production ==
Palm sugar is produced by boiling collected sap until it thickens. The boiled sap can be sold as palm syrup. It is sold in bottles or tins and tends to thicken and crystallise over time. The boiled sap can also be solidified and sold as bricks or cakes. It can range in colour from golden brown to dark brown or almost black, like Indonesian gula aren.

== Use ==
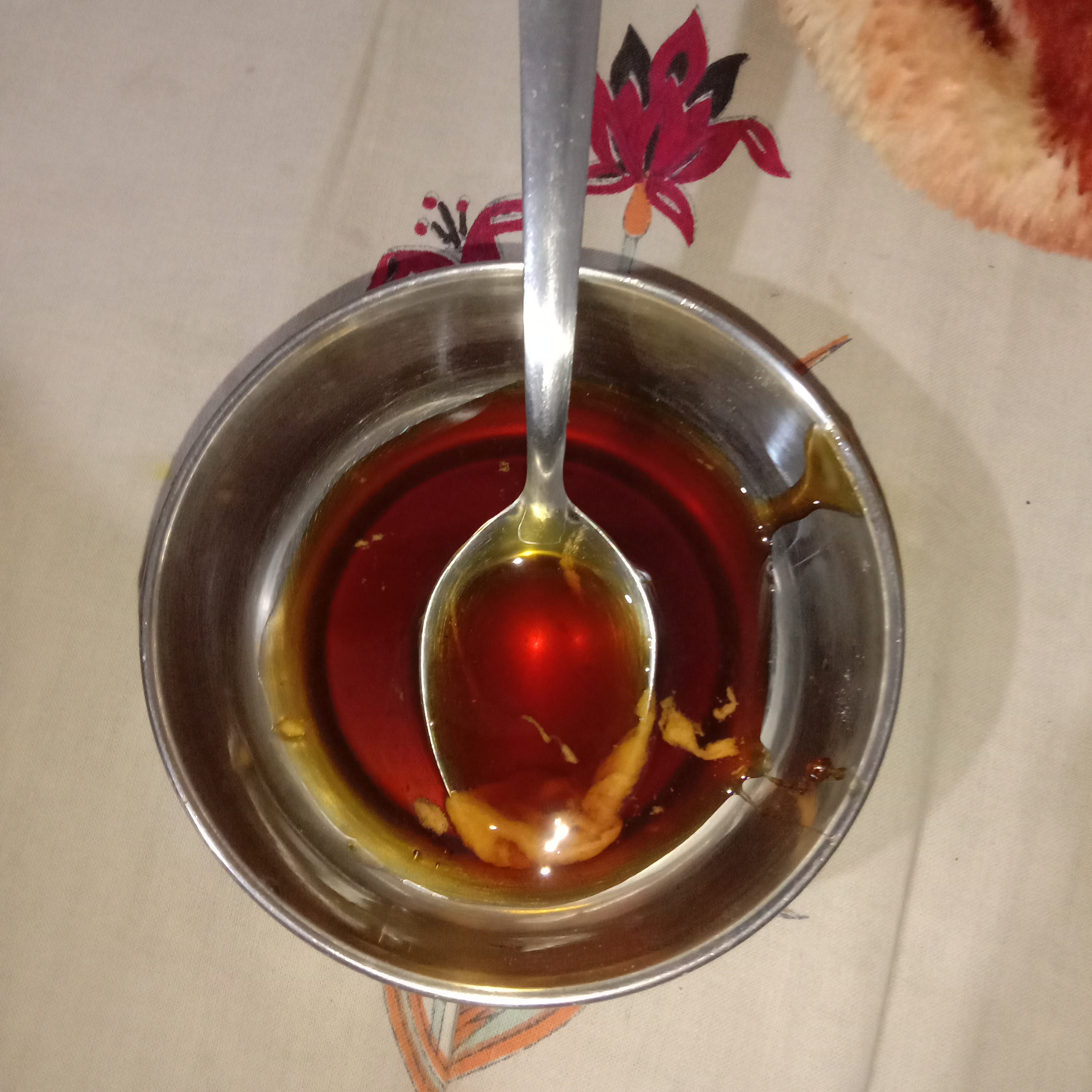
Nolen gur, the new palm sugar, from West Bengal, India.

Palm sugar is an ingredient in both sweet and savoury dishes used throughout Asia, the Middle East, and North Africa.

== Local variants ==
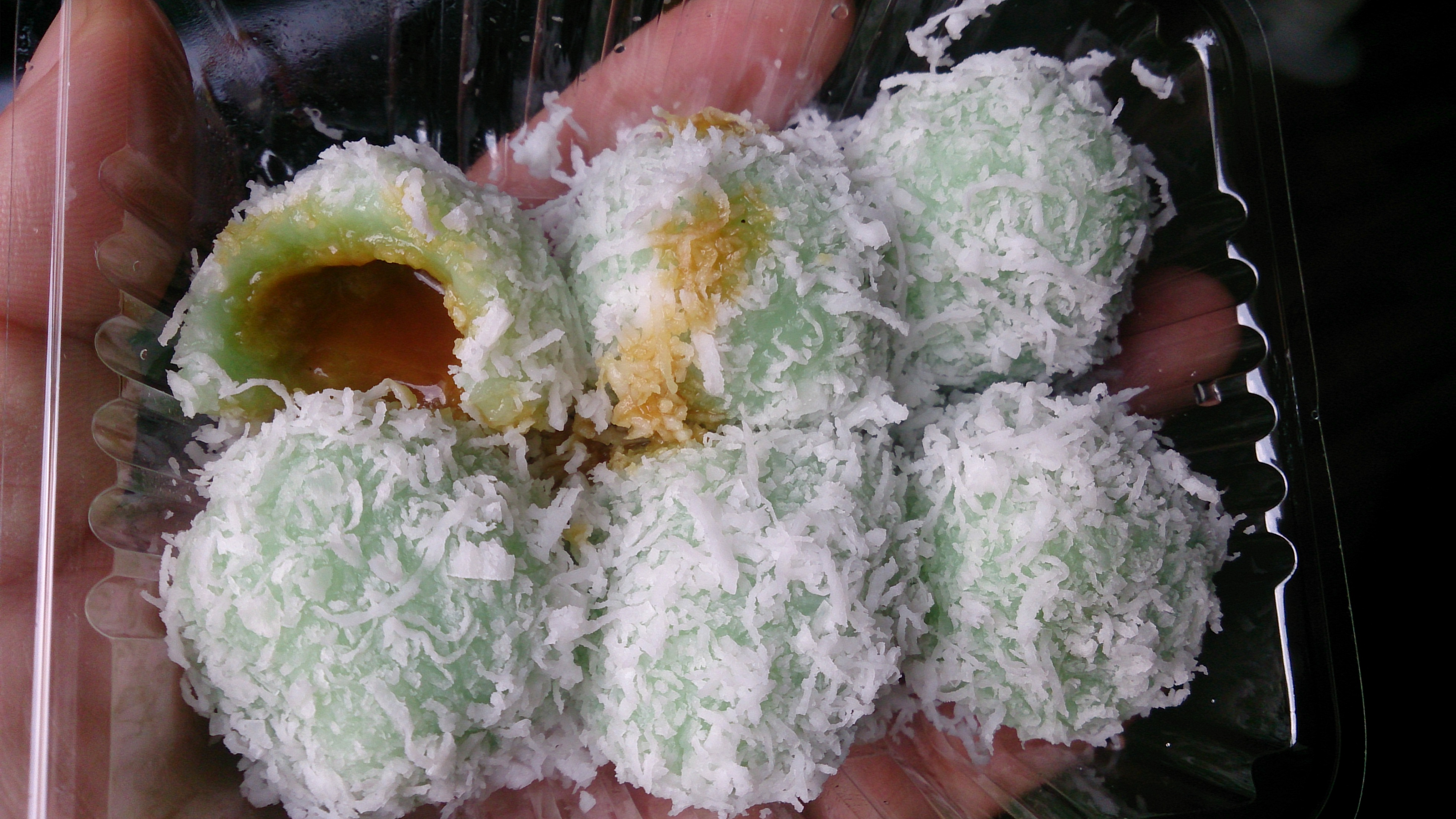
Klepon or onde-onde kue filled with palm sugar (gula jawa or gula melaka)

Palm sugar is known by many names and variants depending on its ingredient, production method, or region. It is known as gula jawa (Javanese sugar) in Indonesia, and gula melaka (Malaccan sugar) in Malaysia. A specific difference in palm sugar naming is seen in Indonesia; if it is made from coconut, it is called as gula jawa or gula merah (red sugar), on the other hand gula aren (aren sugar) refer to palm sugar that specifically made from the sap of aren palm flower buds. Gula jawa has an earthy aroma and deep sweetness with a darker colour closely resembling molasses, while gula aren has paler colour.

Gula melaka is a type of palm sugar made from the sap of flower buds from the coconut palm, or less commonly other palms. It can be dense and sticky. It is known in English as "Malacca sugar", probably because it originated in the state of Malacca, Malaysia (Malay: Melaka). Traditionally, gula melaka is made by extracting the sap from the flower bud of a coconut tree. Several slits are cut into the bud, and a pot is tied underneath to collect the sap. The sap is then boiled until it thickens. Next, the sap is poured into bamboo tubes 8–10 centimetres (3–5 in) long and left to solidify to form cylindrical cake blocks. Due to the labour involved in the production, it is often more expensive than the ubiquitous cane sugar. It is used in some savoury dishes, but mainly in the local desserts and cakes of the Southeast Asian region.

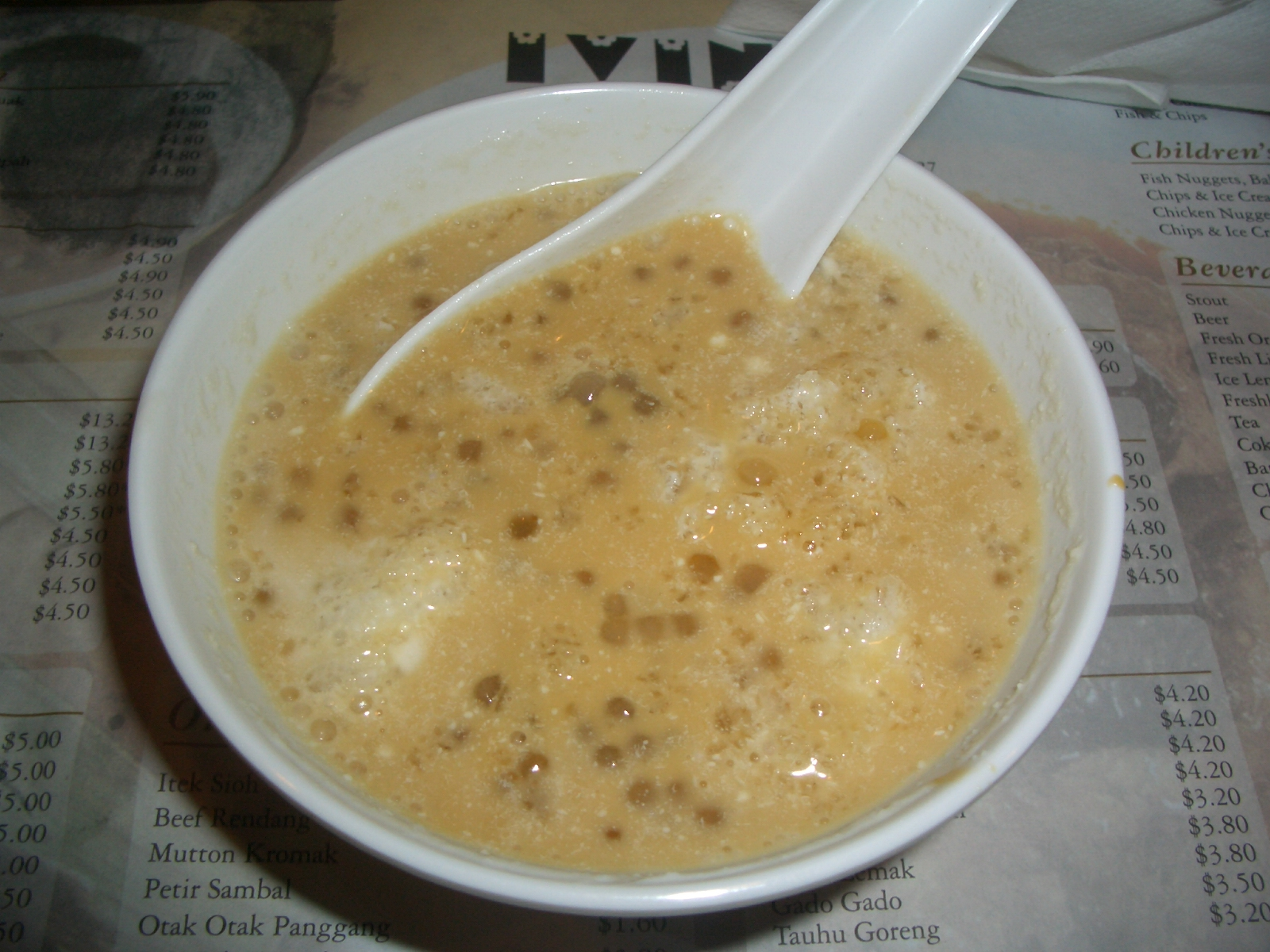
A bowl of gula melaka sago

Gula melaka sago pudding is a dessert made with gula melaka and a common hot or cold dish of Indo-Malay origin. Other examples include chendol and ondeh ondeh, a ball-shaped dessert made from glutinous rice flour, filled with gula melaka, and covered in shredded coconut.

== See also ==
- Coconut sugar – Sugar produced from the coconut palm
- Date sugar – Sugar extracted from dates
- Jaggery – Unrefined cane sugar
