= Gazi Enamul Haque =

Bangladeshi politician

- গাজী এনামুল হক

Member of the Bangladesh Parliament for Jessore-5
- Incumbent
- Assumed office 17 February 2026
- Preceded by: Mohammad Yakub Ali

Personal details
- Born: September 6, 1957 (age 69) Manirampur Upazila, Jessore District
- Party: Bangladesh Jamaat-e-Islami

Gazi Enamul Haque is a Bangladeshi politician of the Bangladesh Jamaat-e-Islami. He is currently serving as a member of parliament from Jessore-5.

== Early life ==
Haque was born on 6 September 1957 in Manirampur Upazila in Jessore District.
