= Bahadurpur, Bangladesh =

Bahadurpur বাহাদুরপুর
- Location in Bangladesh
- Coordinates: 23°1′N 89°2′E
- Country: Bangladesh
- Division: Khulna Division
- District: Jessore District
- Upazila Manirampur: Union Haridaskati
- Time zone: UTC+6 (Bangladesh Time)

Bahadurpur is a village and it is situated under Haridaskati Union of Manirampur Upazila of Jessore District in the division of Khulna, Bangladesh.
