= Chinatola Bazaar =

Bazaar and business hub in Manirampur Upazila, Bangladesh

Coordinates: 22.9551°N 89.2301°E

Chinatola Bazaar is a large bazaar and important business hub in Manirampur Upazila, Bangladesh. It is situated beside the main connecting road of Jessore and Sathkhira districts.
