= Jessore-5 =

Constituency of Bangladesh's Jatiya Sangsad

Coordinates: 23.02°N 89.23°E

- Constituency for the Jatiya Sangsad
- District: Jessore District
- Division: Khulna Division
- Electorate: 319,084 (2018)

Current constituency
- Created: 1973
- Party: Bangladesh Jamaat-e-Islami
- Member of Parliament: Gazi Enamul Haque
- ← 88 Jessore-4 90 Jessore-6 →

Jessore-5 is a constituency represented in the Jatiya Sangsad (National Parliament) of Bangladesh.

== Boundaries ==
The constituency encompasses Manirampur Upazila.

== History ==
The constituency was created for the first general elections in newly independent Bangladesh, held in 1973.

Ahead of the 2008 general election, the Election Commission redrew constituency boundaries to reflect population changes revealed by the 2001 Bangladesh census. The 2008 redistricting altered the boundaries of the constituency.

Ahead of the 2014 general election, the Election Commission expanded the boundaries of the constituency. Previously it excluded one union parishad of Manirampur Upazila: Mancharpur.

== Members of Parliament ==
Election	Member	Party
1973	Tabibar Rahman Sarder	Awami League
1979	Muhammad Ali Tariq	BNP
Major Boundary Changes
1986	Muhammad Wakkas	Jatiya Party
1988	Muhammad Wakkas	Independent
1991	Khan Tipu Sultan	Awami League
Feb 1996	Afsar Ahmad Siddiqui	BNP
Jun 1996	Khan Tipu Sultan	Awami League
2001	Muhammad Wakkas	BNP
2008	Khan Tipu Sultan	Awami League
2014	Swapan Bhattacharjee	Independent
2018	Swapan Bhattacharjee	Awami League
2024	Mohammad Yakub Ali	Independent
2024	Gazi Enamul Haque	Bangladesh Jamaat-e-Islami

== Elections ==
=== Elections in the 2010s ===
General Election 2014: Jessore-5
Party	Candidate	Votes	%	±%
Independent	Swapan Bhattacharjee	78,424	57.3	N/A
AL	Khan Tipu Sultan	58,418	42.7	−9.9
Majority		20,006	14.6	+7.5
Turnout		136,842	47.8	−45.5
Independent hold				

=== Elections in the 2000s ===
General Election 2008: Jessore-5
Party	Candidate	Votes	%	±%
AL	Khan Tipu Sultan	119,914	52.6	+10.1
BNP	Muhammad Wakkas	103,739	45.5	−6.9
IAB	Md. Ibadul Islam Khalashi	3,937	1.7	N/A
Jatiya Samajtantrik Dal-JSD	Massudrana Mohammad Hafiz	235	0.1	N/A
Majority		16,175	7.1	−2.9
Turnout		227,825	93.3	+5.3
AL gain from BNP				

General Election 2001: Jessore-5
Party	Candidate	Votes	%	±%
BNP	Muhammad Wakkas	110,835	52.4	+25.1
AL	Khan Tipu Sultan	89,781	42.5	+3.5
IJOF	Quamruzzaman	10,718	5.1	N/A
Majority		21,054	10.0	−1.7
Turnout		211,334	88.0	+2.9
BNP gain from AL				

=== Elections in the 1990s ===
General Election June 1996: Jessore-5
Party	Candidate	Votes	%	±%
AL	Khan Tipu Sultan	64,586	39.0	−0.4
BNP	Iqbal Hossain	45,237	27.3	−4.3
Jamaat	Habibur Rahman	30,882	18.7	−4.9
JP(E)	Muhammad Wakkas	23,930	14.5	+12.6
BKA	Matiar Rahman	400	0.2	N/A
Zaker Party	Md. Abdus Salam	205	0.1	−0.1
Bangladesh Hindu League	Shishir Kumar Biswas	170	0.1	−0.4
Majority		19,349	11.7	+.3.8
Turnout		165,410	85.1	+13.5
AL gain from BNP				

General Election 1991: Jessore-5
Party	Candidate	Votes	%	±%
AL	Khan Tipu Sultan	55,214	39.4	
BNP	Iqbal Hossain	44,202	31.6	
Jamaat	Habibur Rahman	33,002	23.6	
JP(E)	A. Latif	2,592	1.9	
IOJ	Muhammad Wakkas	2,488	1.8	
UCL	Abdul Hamid	1,485	1.1	
Bangladesh Hindu League	Bishnupada Saha	756	0.5	
Zaker Party	Sheikh Hafizur Rahman	236	0.2	
Majority		11,012	7.9	
Turnout		139,975	71.6	
AL gain from JP(E)				
