= Gabukhali =

- Village
- Location within Bangladesh
- Coordinates: 23°1′N 89°14′E
- Country: Bangladesh
- Division: Khulna
- District: Jessore
- Upazila: Manirampur

Population (2011)
  - Total: 2,203

Languages
  - Official: Bengali, English
- Time zone: UTC+6 (BST)
- Website: dhakuriaup.jessore.gov.bd

Gabukhali is a village located in Dhakuria Union in the Manirampur Upazila of the Jessore District in the country of Bangladesh.
