= Muhammad Ali Tariq =

Bangladeshi Politician

Member of Bangladesh Parliament
- In office 1979–1986
- Preceded by: Tabibar Rahman Sarder
- Succeeded by: Muhammad Wakkas

Personal details
- Party: Bangladesh Nationalist Party

Muhammad Ali Tariq is a Bangladesh Nationalist Party politician and a former member of parliament for Jessore-5.

== Career ==
Tariq was elected to parliament from Jessore-5 as a Bangladesh Nationalist Party candidate in 1979.
