= Jhanpa Union =

Jhanpa Union ঝাঁপা ইউনিয়ন
- Union
- Jhanpa Union
- Country: Bangladesh
- Division: Khulna
- District: Jessore
- Upazila: Manirampur

Area
  - Total: 76.63 km^{2} (29.59 sq mi)

Population (2011)
  - Total: 24,675
  - Density: 322.0/km^{2} (834.0/sq mi)
- Time zone: UTC+6 (BST)
- Website: jhanpaup.jessore.gov.bd

Jhanpa Union (Bengali: ঝাঁপা ইউনিয়ন) is a Union Parishad under Manirampur Upazila of Jessore District in the division of Khulna, Bangladesh. It has an area of 29.59 square kilometres (11.42 square miles) and a population of 24,675.
