= Khedapara Union =

Khedapara Union খেদাপাড়া ইউনিয়ন
- Union
- Khedapara Union
- Country: Bangladesh
- Division: Khulna
- District: Jessore
- Upazila: Manirampur

Area
  - Total: 82.96 km^{2} (32.03 sq mi)

Population (2011)
  - Total: 26,965
  - Density: 325.0/km^{2} (841.8/sq mi)
- Time zone: UTC+6 (BST)
- Website: khedaparaup.jessore.gov.bd

Khedapara Union (Bengali: খেদাপাড়া ইউনিয়ন) is a Union Parishad under Manirampur Upazila of Jessore District in the division of Khulna, Bangladesh. It has an area of 32.03 square kilometres and a population of 26,965.
