= Hariharnagar Union =

Union in Khulna, Bangladesh

Hariharnagar Union হরিহরনগর ইউনিয়ন
- Union
- Hariharnagar Union
- Country: Bangladesh
- Division: Khulna
- District: Jessore
- Upazila: Manirampur
- Time zone: UTC+6 (BST)
- Website: hariharnagarup.jessore.gov.bd

Hariharnagar Union (Bengali: হরিহরনগর ইউনিয়ন) is a union parishad under Manirampur Upazila of Jessore District in the division of Khulna, Bangladesh.
