= Bhojgati Union =

Union in Khulna, Bangladesh

Bhojgati Union ভোজগাতি ইউনিয়ন
- Union
- Bhojgati Union
- Country: Bangladesh
- Division: Khulna
- District: Jessore
- Upazila: Manirampur
- Time zone: UTC+6 (BST)
- Website: bhojgatiup.jessore.gov.bd

Bhojgati Union (Bengali: ভোজগাতি ইউনিয়ন) is a Union Parishad under Manirampur Upazila of Jessore District in the division of Khulna, Bangladesh.
