= Mound of Dam Dam Peer =

Mound of Dam Dam Peer দমদম পীরের ঢিবি
- Archaeological Heritage
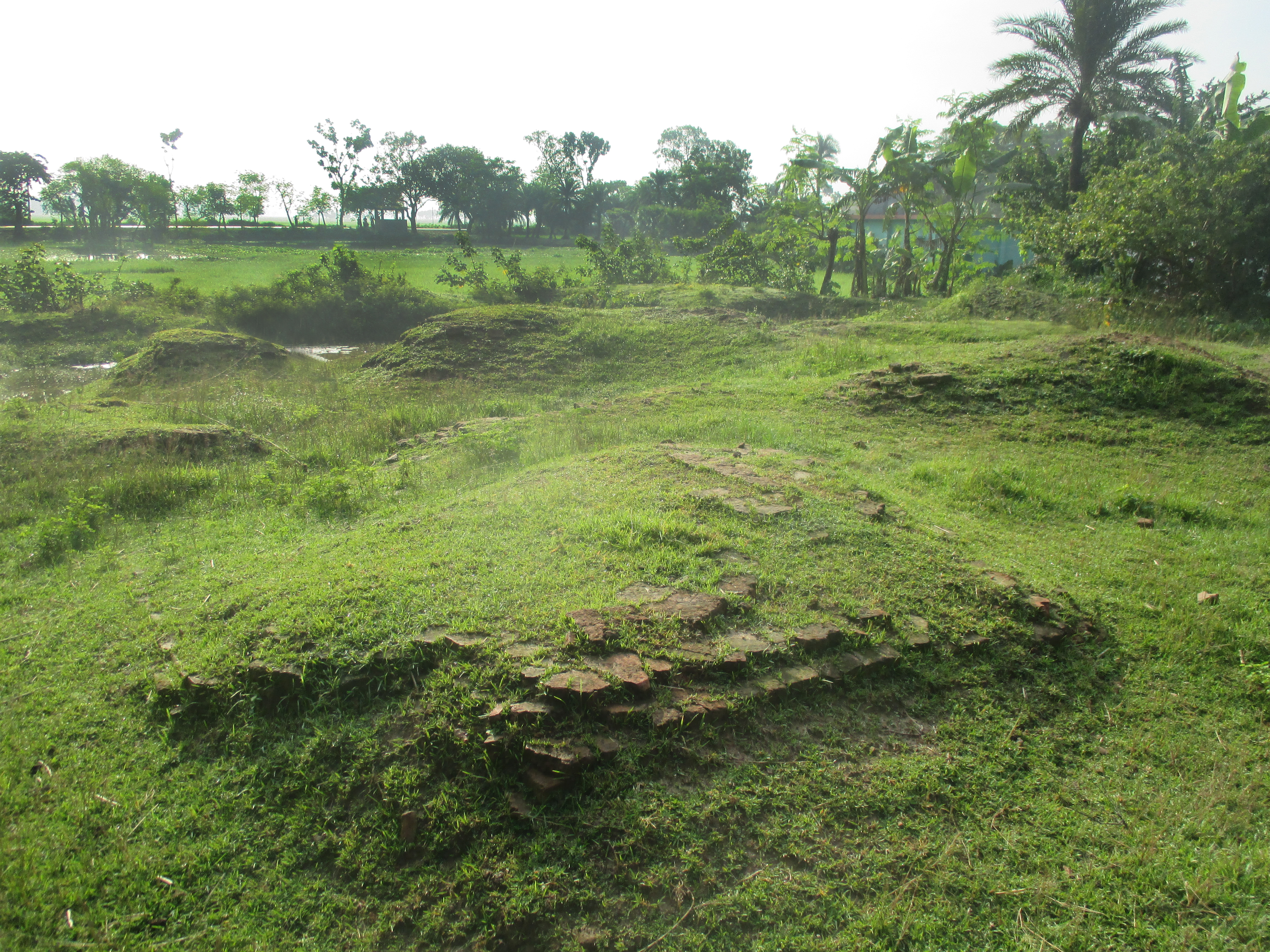
- Mound of Dam Dam Peer
- Country: Bangladesh
- Division: Khulna
- District: Jessore
- Upazila: Manirampur
- Time zone: UTC+6 (BST)
- Postal Code: 7440

Mound of Dam Dam Peer (Bengali: দমদম পীরের ঢিবি) is an ancient archaeological heritage at Manirampur Upazila of Jessore District in the Division of Khulna, Bangladesh. It is thought to be the most ancient relic of Bangladesh which is about 1800 years old. It is located at the village Sonargram of Bhojgati Union in Manirampur Upazila of Jessore District. It is located a few kilometres away from Jessore town.

== Antiquity of the mound ==
Once the mound was thought to be the evidence of the period of the Sena dynasty or Sultans. But the concept was changed after digging it more. Now, nobody thinks the Mound to be only three or four hundred years older. The local people and experts think it to be the contemporary of the ancient civilisation of the Buddhist Bihar at Lalmai Pahar even it may be more ancient than that.

Lalmai is the civilisation of 6th–7th century. According to Lalmai, the Mound of Dam Dam Peer is thirteen to fourteen hundred years older. The archaeologists and the local people think that the Mound of Dam Dam Peer is an evidence of an ancient civilisation which is eighteen hundred years older.

== Archeology ==
Small Buddhist statue made of stone, eighteen rooms, terracotta plaques and lotus, snake-headed terracotta pots, metal rings, bangles, pots, pans etc. have been found here. The walls of the rooms are designed with geometrical crafts. The crafts of the stairs are almost same.

== History ==
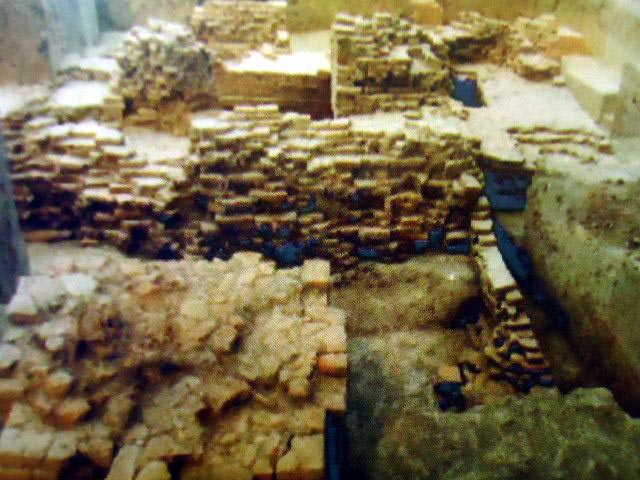
Relics of the Mound of Dam Dam Peer

The experts think that at first the Buddhists lived here. After that, the Hindus lived here and the Muslims came here at last. Most probably they made a dormitory of Saints for preaching. The signs and existence of three civilisation have been detected here.

"Dam Dam" was named after the sounds created while walking on the Mound. It used to be heard like "Dam Dam". So, such a name was chosen. But the local people could not say anything about why such kind of sounds were created. And what is said seems to be fictions.

It is heard from the older people of the village that a dormitory of a Saint named Mongol Shah, was a little distance away from the Mound of Dam Dam Peer. Once the local people used to come here to pray for curing from different kinds of diseases and wished to offer money, hens, goats etc. for curing. After curing from diseases they used to slaughter the offered animals and perform religious conducts here. But now the activities are less than the past. Nobody knows actually from when the conducts are being performed.

In 1986, the local people established a Madrasa attached to the Mound. While constructing the Madrasa a brick-wall was uncovered from the Mound. The incident triggered much. Thousands of people from far and near came here to see the rooms which were hidden under the ground for thousands of years. Thus, the name of the Mound of Dam Dam Peer were spreading everywhere.

In 2004–05, the Government started digging the Mound. At first, eight roofless rooms were found. From that time to 2006–07, totally eighteen rooms were found. At that time, it was thought to be a temple of Jain community to see the Lotus-crafted bricks at the temple which was established in 100 B.C.

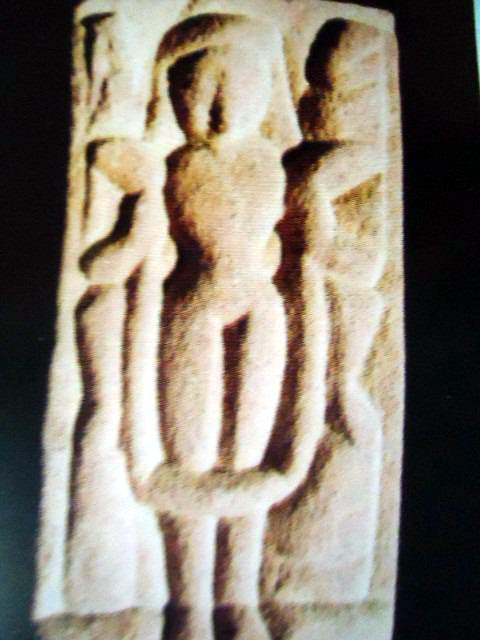
Snake-headed Terracotta pots

Seeing the snake-headed terracotta pots, it is thought that the worship of Panchanag or Saptanag were performed here which is related to the Jain religion. Besides, the terracotta plaques bearing the image of Mallinath, the 13th Teerthankar (Saint) of Jain religion says that it was the temple of Jain religion.

There is a large tank beside the Mound that has several old stories connected to it. Pots used to come here floating along the water, and people used to call from here at night speaking about the slaughtering of human beings. These are some of the many incidents. There are more strange stories about it, such as, how there were some trees inside the water of the tank which were usable for curing from all kinds of diseases. The name of the trees was "Acheen Brikkho" (Meaning: Unknown Trees). Three of those trees are still alive now, but the trees do not have this ability anymore.

There is a well near the tank. There are several stories about the well. Such as, when any ceremony was held at any home of that area and he any virgin girl came to the well and told the well about the ceremony of her home, them within a few moments golden plates, spoons, bowls etc. would be found beside the well. After using they had to return those things and those things would be vanished after keeping the beside the well. So, the tank was named as "Kumari Dighi" (Tank of Virgin).

There were seven unknown flower trees near the well beside the tank. There is a hearsay that the trees were planted eighteen hundred years ago. Three of those trees died with the passage of time. The rest four trees are still alive now.

The tank's main attraction is the presence of flowering trees that exhibit a distinctive seasonal cycle. For approximately six months of the year, the trees appear dormant, while during the remaining six months, they produce tender leaves and flowers. Their blossoms are renowned for their beauty and sweet fragrance, which are said to be unmatched elsewhere in the country. Despite their appeal, the trees are not collected for cultivation elsewhere, as they cannot survive outside their natural habitat.

== Gallery ==
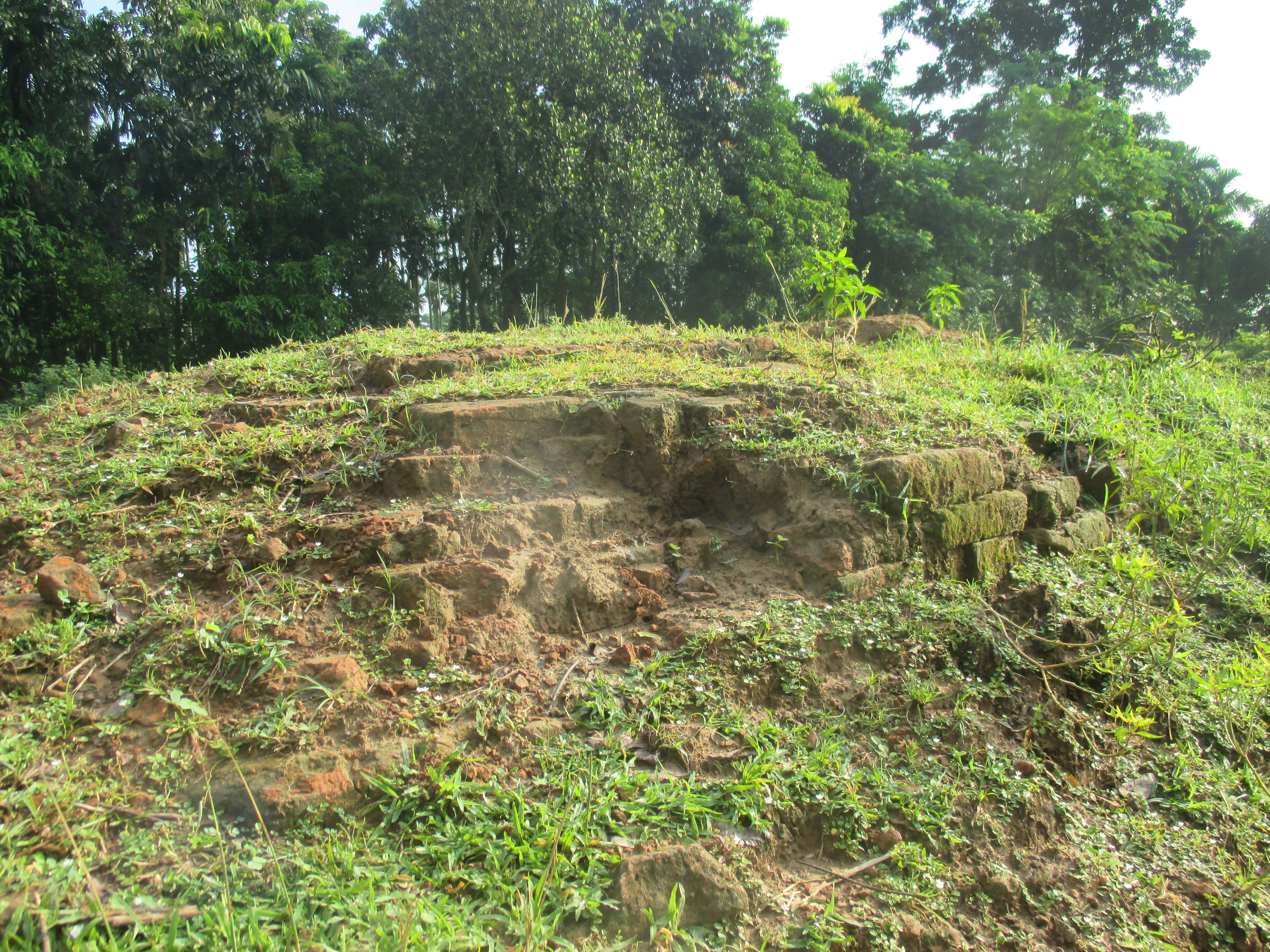
Dam Dam Peer Mound

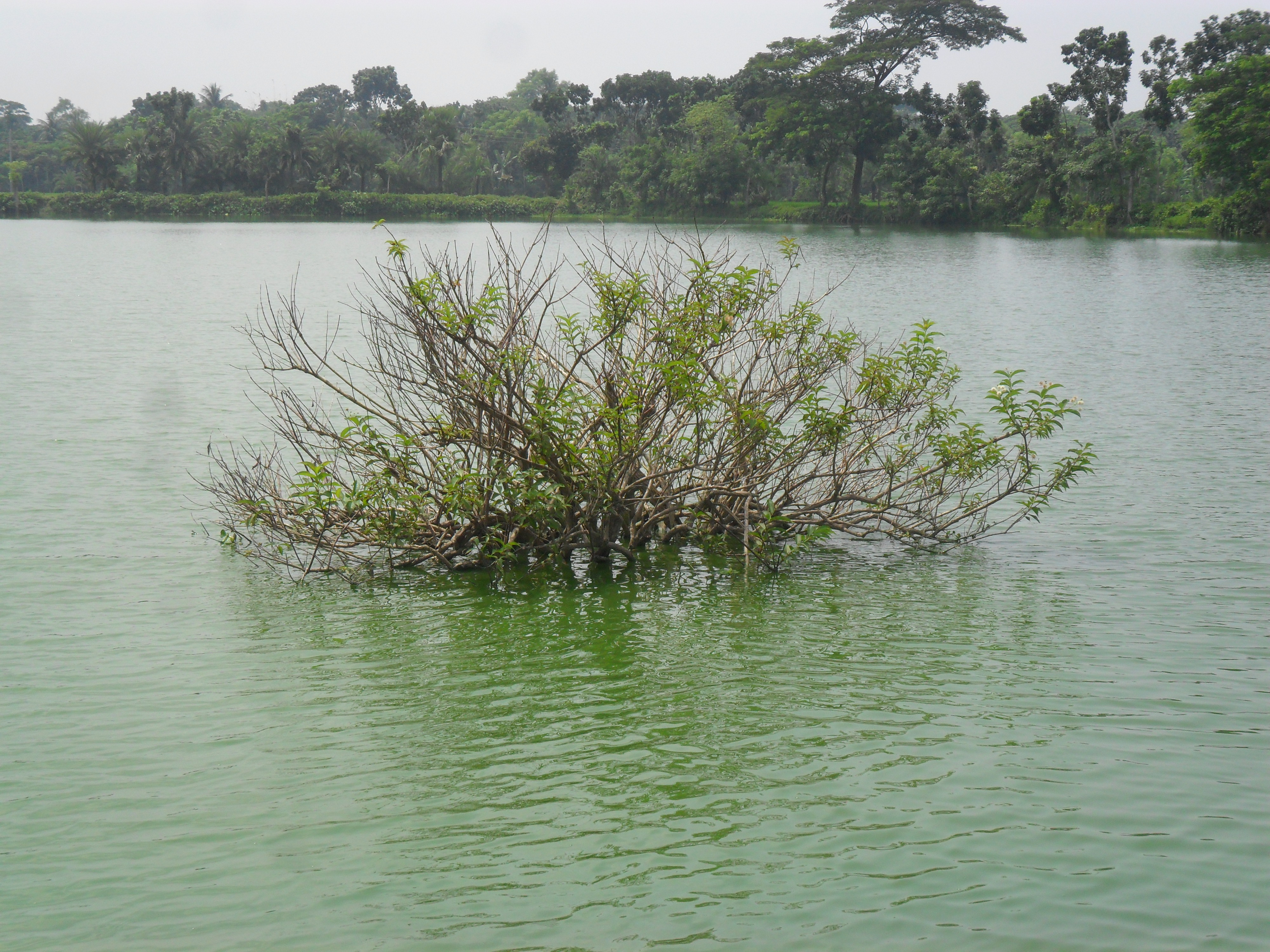
"Acheen Brikkho" (Unknown Trees) in Tank Water

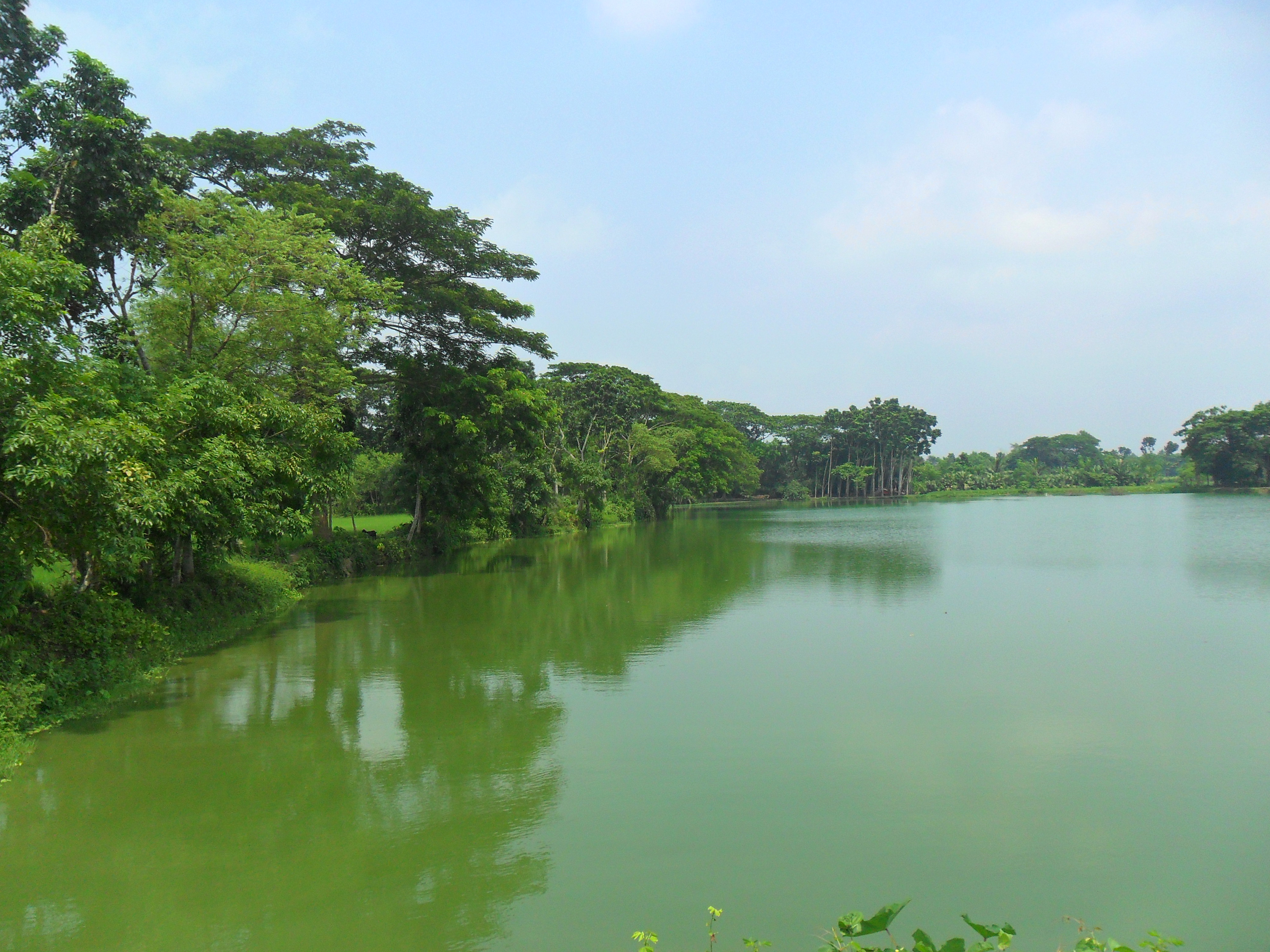
Tank of Dam Dam Peer - "Kumari Dighi" (Tank of Virgin)

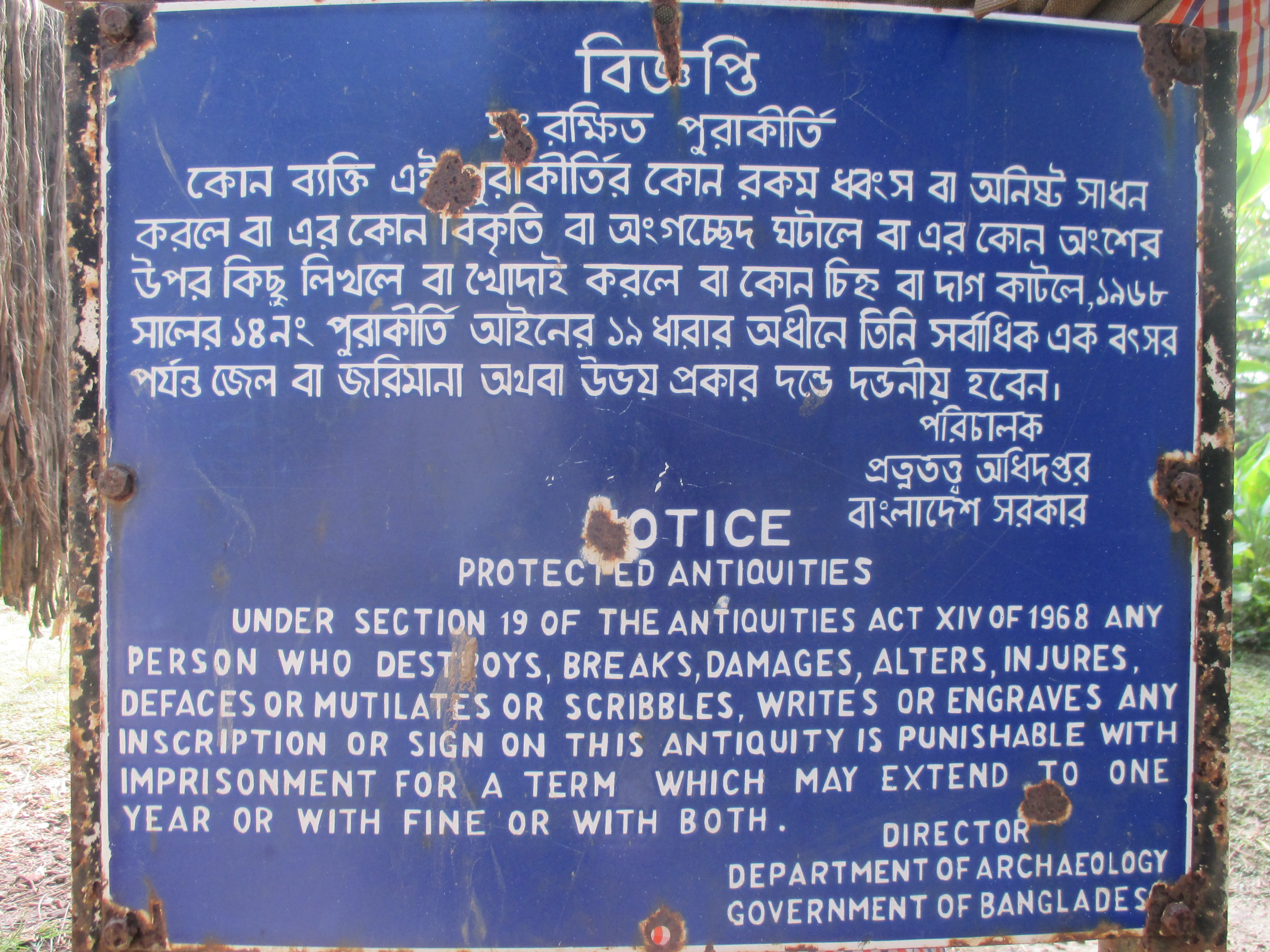
Department of Archaeology notice in Dam Dam Peer Mound

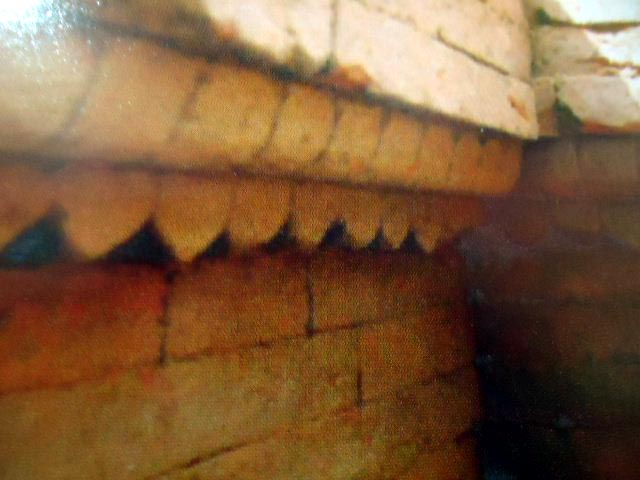
Crafted wall of the Mound of Dam Dam Peer

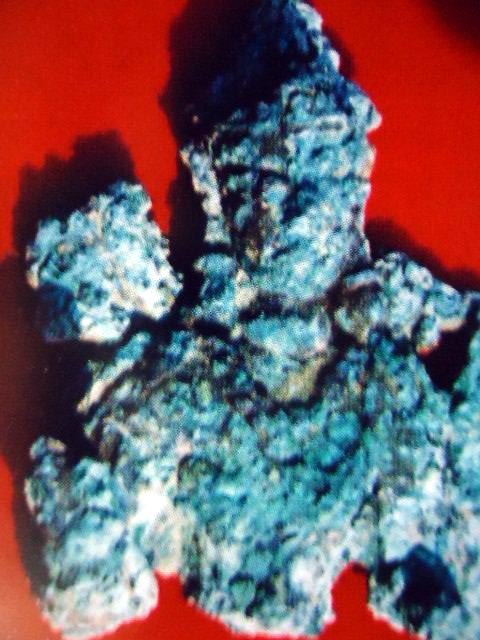
Stone made Buddhist statute
