= Pijush Kanti Bhattacharjee =

Bangladeshi politician (1940–2025)

- পীযুষ কানতি ভট্টাচার্য্য

Member of Parliament for Jessore-7
- In office 1973–1975
- Preceded by: Constituency Established
- Succeeded by: Gazi Ershad Ali

Personal details
- Born: 1 March 1940 Parala, Manirampur Upazila, Bengal Province, British India
- Died: 6 November 2025 (aged 85) Jashore, Bangladesh
- Party: Bangladesh Awami League
- Relatives: Swapan Bhattacharjee (brother)
- Education: University of Rajshahi

Pijush Kanti Bhattacharjee (1 March 1940 – 6 November 2025) was a Bangladeshi academic and politician from Jessore belonging to Bangladesh Awami League. He was a member of the Jatiya Sangsad. Bhattacharjee was a presidium member of the central committee of Bangladesh Awami League. His brother Swapan Bhattacharjee is the former state minister of the Ministry of Local Government, Rural Development and Co-operatives.

== Life and career ==
Bhattacharjee was born on 1 March 1940 at Parala in Manirampur Upazila of Jessore District, Bengal Province, to Sudhir Bhattacharjee and Usha Rani Bhattacharjee. He completed matriculation from Khajura M. N. Mitra Multilateral High School and completed higher secondary studies from Michael Modhushudon College. He graduated from University of Rajshahi in 1961 and completed postgraduate studies there in 1968. He was an organizer of the Liberation War of Bangladesh.

He was a teacher at Mashihati High School and Gopalpur High School. He was a teacher at Keshabpur Degree College too. He was also the vice principal of Manirampur Degree College.

Bhattacharjee was elected as a member of the Jatiya Sangsad from Jessore-7 in 1973.

Bhattacharjee died on 6 November 2025, at the age of 85.
