= Kultia Union =

Union in Khulna, Bangladesh

Kultia Union কুলটিয়া ইউনিয়ন
- Union
- Kultia Union
- Country: Bangladesh
- Division: Khulna
- District: Jessore
- Upazila: Manirampur
- Time zone: UTC+6 (BST)
- Website: kultiaup.jessore.gov.bd

Kultia Union (Bengali: কুলটিয়া ইউনিয়ন) is a Union Parishad under Manirampur Upazila of Jessore District in the division of Khulna, Bangladesh.

== Demography ==
Religions in Kultia Union (2022)
Religion	Percent
Hinduism	53.32%
Islam	46.63%
Other or not stated	0.04%
