= Manirampur Government High School =

- মণিরামপুর সরকারি উচ্চ বিদ্যালয়

Location
- Manirampur; Jessore; Bangladesh

Information
- Type: Public boys' school
- Motto: পড় তোমার প্রভুর নামে (Read in the name of your creator)
- Established: 1932
- Grades: 6 - 10
- Gender: Male
- Language: Bengali
- Campus size: 3.98 Acres
- Campus type: Urban
- Colors: White and navy blue
- Sports: Football; Cricket; Volleyball; Badminton
- Accreditation: Board of Intermediate and Secondary Education, Jessore
- Yearbook: Provati
- Website: www.manirampurschool.edu.bd

Manirampur Government High School (Bengali: মণিরামপুর সরকারি উচ্চ বিদ্যালয়; MGHS) is a public boys' school located in Manirampur Upazila under Jessore District, Bangladesh. It is a state school located at the intersections of Jessore-Satkhira Highway and Manirampur-Jhikargacha Road.

== History ==
Metallic Logo of Manirampur Government High School

The school was established in 1932 during the reign of British Government in Indian subcontinent. The school was approved in 1958 during the reign of Pakistan Government, in then East Pakistan. Because of the restless efforts and cooperation of Alhajj Mufti Mawlana Mohammad Wakkas, the state minister of religion of the Government of People's Republic of Bangladesh, the then President Alhajj Hussain Muhammad Ershad announced and then implemented the school as a Government school on February 2, 1987. The school follows the SSC curriculum in Bengali medium under the Board of Intermediate and Secondary Education, Jessore. The EIIN is 116119. The school code is 6224.

=== Name history ===
- Manirampur M. E. School (1932-'40)
- Manirampur Junior High School (1940-'57)
- Manirampur English High School (1957-'58)
- Manirampur Thana Model High School (1959-'62)
- Manirampur Multipurpose (Bohumukhee) High School (1962-'87)
- Manirampur Government Pilot High School (1987-....)
- Manirampur Government High School (....-Present)

== Campus ==
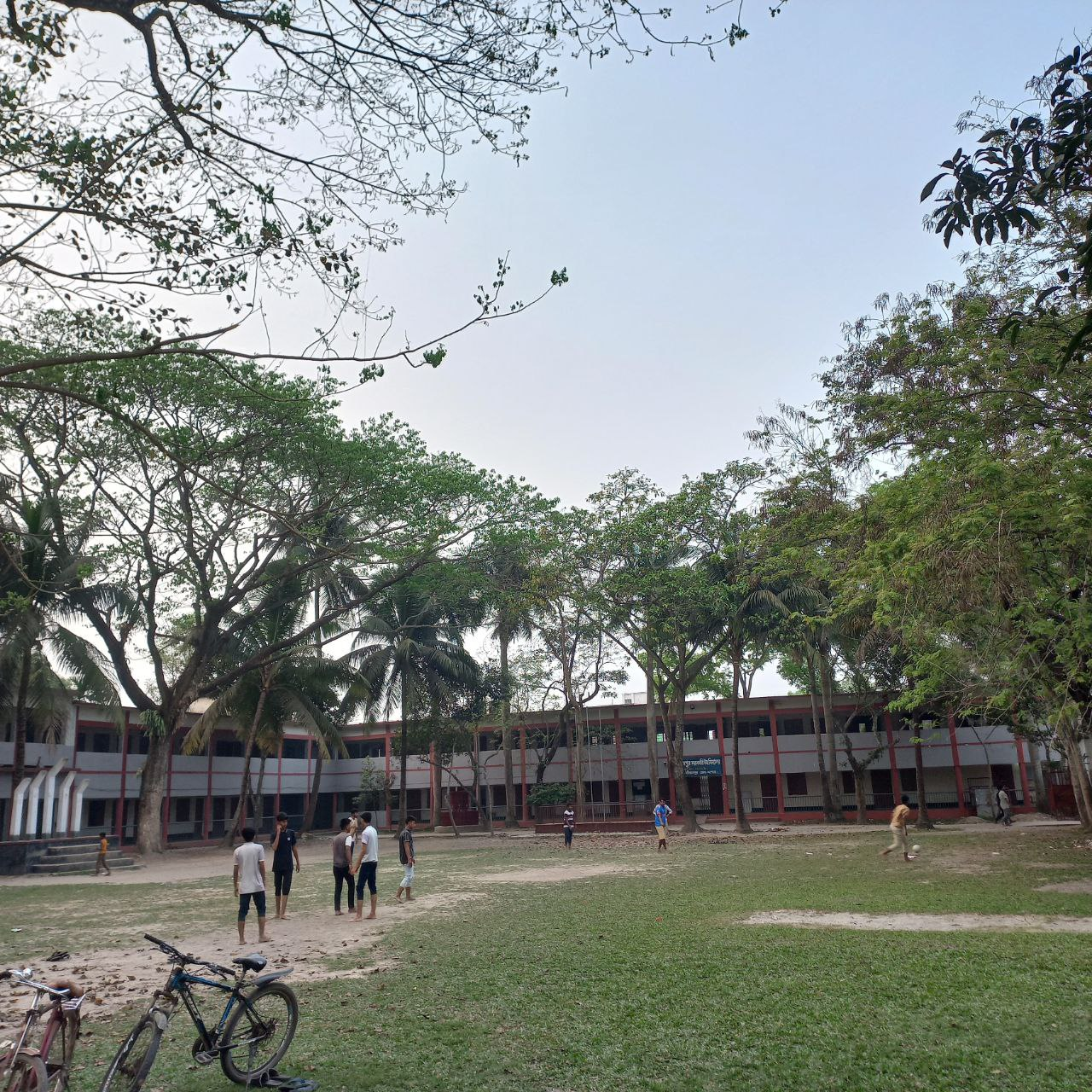
Manirampur Gov Secondary School

The school campus is located at the manorial of Hakoba in Manirampur sadar which is bounded by Jessore-Satkhira highway and cove of river Harihar at the east, village Hakoba at the west, Manirampur-Jhikargacha road at the north and river Harihar at the south.

The campus has an area of 3.98 acres. The school has three buildings attached together. The old buildings are two storeyed and the new building is three storeyed.

There is a mosque in the campus which was built by the money of Masjid Fund raised by the students' fees.

There is a Shaheed Minar (Monument of Martyrs) at the campus which was used as the Central Shaheed Minar of Manirampur upazila till 2015 before construction of Manirampur's new Central Shaheed Minar at Upazila complex.

The campus has two playgrounds. One is used for daily assembly and other is used for sports. The playground is also used as a venue of annual Book Fair & other fairs and as a public stadium for holding different sports of the Upazila.

Manirampur Government Primary School is situated at the south-east corner within the campus.

== Headmasters' directory ==
| Sl no | Name | Qualification | Working period |
|---|---|---|---|
| 01 | Kalipada Mondal | B.A. B.T | 1932-35 |
| 02 | Babu Satish Chandra Dey (in charge) | Entrance | 1935-38 |
| 03 | Md Asadullah | B.A. B.Ed. | 1938-42 |
| 04 | Arshad Ali Gazi | I.A. Plucked | 1942-44 |
| 05 | Montaz Uddin | B.A. Plucked | 1944-45 |
| 06 | Golam Rasul | B.A. Plucked | 1945-54 |
| 07 | Fazlul Karim | B.A. (Cal) Distinction | 1955-59 |
| 08 | Abdul Baki | B.Sc. B.T | 1959-61 |
| 09 | Fazlul Karim | B.A. (Cal) Distinction | 1961-62 |
| 10 | Md Khorshed Alam | M.A. M.Ed. | 1962-63 |
| 11 | Abdul Zabber | B.A. B.Ed. | 1963-65 |
| 12 | Md Nurul Islam (in charge) | B.Sc. | 1965-66 |
| 13 | Md Mahabubul Haque Khan | B.Sc. M.A. B.T | 1966-67 |
| 14 | Md Abdul Jalil | B.A. | 1967-67 |
| 15 | Md Harez Uddin (in charge) | M.A. | 1967-68 |
| 16 | Rezaul Karim | M.A. M.Ed. | 1968-69 |
| 17 | Md Abdul Aziz | M.A. B.Ed. | 1969-96 |
| 18 | S. M. Abdul Zabber (in charge) | B.A. B.Ed. | 1996-97 |
| 19 | Md Abdul Aziz | M.A. B.Ed. | 1997-99 |
| 20 | K. M. Shamsur Rahman (in charge) | B.Sc. B.Ed. | 1999-99 |
| 21 | Md Sirajul Islam (in charge) | B.A. M.Ed. | 1999-00 |
| 22 | Md Kamrul Hasan (in charge) | B.A. B.P.Ed | 2000-03 |
| 23 | K. M. Shamsur Rahman (in charge) | B.Sc. B.Ed. | 2003-03 |
| 24 | Md Abdul Halim (in charge) | B.Sc. B.Ed. | 2003-03 |
| 25 | K. M. Shamsur Rahman (in charge) | B.Sc. B.Ed. | 2003-05 |
| 26 | Md Abdus Satter (in charge) | | 2005-.. |
| | (2005-2015 will be added soon) | | |

== Structure ==
The school enrolls students from class (grade) 6 to 10. The school operates in one shift. Each class has average 60 students. Class 9 and 10 are subdivided into three sections: science, arts, and commerce group.

== Admission ==
Students don't need to participate in any admission test for getting chance into this school. Presently the admission test is abolished and students are admitted through Lottery system maintained by the Ministry of Education.

== Daily assembly ==
To promote discipline and obedience, the school holds a daily assembly before classes. The assembly includes recitations from the Quran and the Gita, an oath, and the singing of the national anthem of Bangladesh.

== Uniform ==
The school uniform is white shirt with navy blue full pant, white shoes and navy blue sweater (for winter only). The school's monogram is printed on the shirt's pocket and shoulder cuff is provided from school.

== Exam system and result ==
There are two terms in a year. First one is 'Half-yearly' term (January - June) another one is 'Annual' term (July - December). Students get every of their results in their personal score-card.

== Teachers-guardians conference ==
Conferences are called to aid the students and to discuss their problems. This likely leads to the school's good results in SSC and JSC.

== Library ==
The library has a good collection of books. Most of them were bought by coeval sanctioned money during the establishment of the school. Others were bought by annually approved money.

== School magazine ==
The name of the school magazine is Provati. Although the magazine is not published on a regular annual basis, it serves as an important historical record of the school’s development and growth. It preserves the traditions, achievements, and experiences of the school, providing future generations of students with an understanding of its heritage.

The magazine also serves as an important platform for students to express their creativity and showcase their talents. Alongside their academic pursuits, students are encouraged to participate in sports and athletics, arts and crafts, science clubs, dramatics, and other extracurricular activities. These opportunities enrich their educational experience, foster personal development, and make their years at school more engaging, meaningful, and memorable.

However, intellectual activities such as debates, elocution, and essay-writing competitions appear to be less frequently organized. Since the school magazine serves as a reflection of the school’s activities and achievements, greater involvement from teachers could encourage students to develop their ideas, writing abilities, and creative expression. Such initiatives would not only enrich the content of Provati but also contribute to improving its overall quality and standard.

== Extracurricular sports ==
The students of MGHS are active in sports. The annual sports competition is organized by the school authority in February each year. Sprints (100 to 400 meters), long jump, and high jump are few to mention among different kinds of sports in which students participate.

Inter school sports competitions are arranged every year that includes cricket, football, handball and other athletics events.

== Clubs ==
- Scouting Club

== See also ==
- List of schools in Bangladesh
- Education in Bangladesh
- State school
- Jessore District

== Citations ==
- স্মরণিকা - প্রাক্তন ছাত্র পুনর্মিলনী ১৯৩২-১৯৯৯ [Souvenir - The Former Students Reunion 1932-1999] (in Bengali). 2000.
