= Nehalpur Union, Manirampur =

Union in Khulna, Bangladesh

Nehalpur Union নেহালপুর ইউনিয়ন
- Union
- Nehalpur Union
- Country: Bangladesh
- Division: Khulna
- District: Jessore
- Upazila: Manirampur

Area
  - Total: 22.80 km^{2} (8.80 sq mi)

Population (2011)
  - Total: 22,161
  - Density: 972.0/km^{2} (2,517/sq mi)
- Time zone: UTC+6 (BST)
- Website: nehalpurup.jessore.gov.bd

Nehalpur Union (Bengali: নেহালপুর ইউনিয়ন) is a union parishad under Manirampur Upazila of Jessore District in the division of Khulna, Bangladesh. It has an area of 8.80 square kilometres and a population of 22,161.
