= Rohita Union =

Union in Khulna, Bangladesh

Rohita Union রোহিতা ইউনিয়ন
- Union
- Rohita Union
- Country: Bangladesh
- Division: Khulna
- District: Jessore
- Upazila: Manirampur

Area
  - Total: 77.70 km^{2} (30.00 sq mi)

Population (2011)
  - Total: 15,738
  - Density: 202.5/km^{2} (524.6/sq mi)
- Time zone: UTC+6 (BST)
- Website: rohitaup.jessore.gov.bd

Rohita Union (Bengali: রোহিতা ইউনিয়ন) is a Union Parishad under Manirampur Upazila of Jessore District in the division of Khulna, Bangladesh. It has an area of 30 square kilometres and a population of 15,738.
