= Durbadanga Union =

Durbadanga Union দুর্বাডাঙ্গা ইউনিয়ন
- Union
- Durbadanga Union
- Country: Bangladesh
- Division: Khulna
- District: Jessore
- Upazila: Manirampur

Area
  - Total: 26.16 km^{2} (10.10 sq mi)

Population (2011)
  - Total: 22,650
  - Density: 865.8/km^{2} (2,242/sq mi)
- Time zone: UTC+6 (BST)
- Website: durbadangaup.jessore.gov.bd

Durbadanga Union (Bengali: দুর্বাডাঙ্গা ইউনিয়ন) is a Union Parishad under Manirampur Upazila of Jessore District in the division of Khulna, Bangladesh. It has an area of 10.1 square kilometres and a population of 22,650.
