= Dhakuria Protapkati Secondary School =

Coordinates: 23.066°N 89.279°E

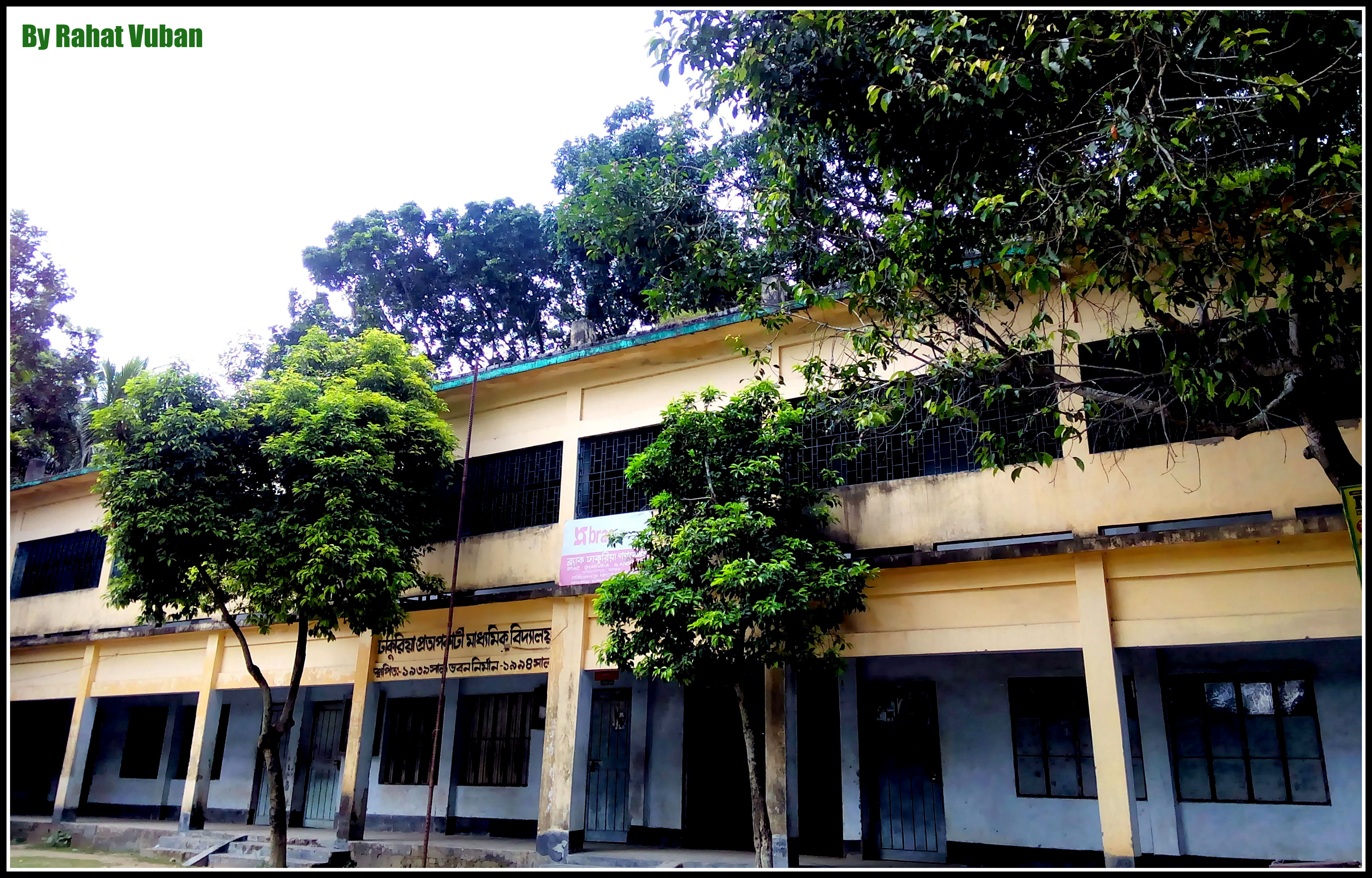

Information
- Established: 26 October 1939; 85 years ago

Dhakuria Protapkati Secondary School is a secondary school in Dhakuria, a village under Manirampur Upazila of Jessore District in Bangladesh.

== Motto ==
An Advanced Knowledge Island Since 26.10.1939

== Founder ==
Babu Probodh Kumar Mitra was born in Dhakuria on 1 February 1915/ After completing his primary and secondary education form Dhakuria he got admitted to Kolkata University.

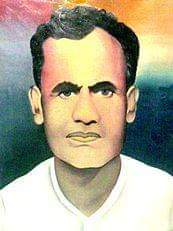
Babu Probodh Kumar Mitra

Mitra graduated from university obtaining First Class . He was awarded a gold medal from the university of Calcutta. He was offered lucrative jobs by the British Government but considering the people, he rejected all of them and came back to his village.

He felt the importance of forming an educational institution. He organized a meeting with some of the leaders and the general people of the village.

== History ==
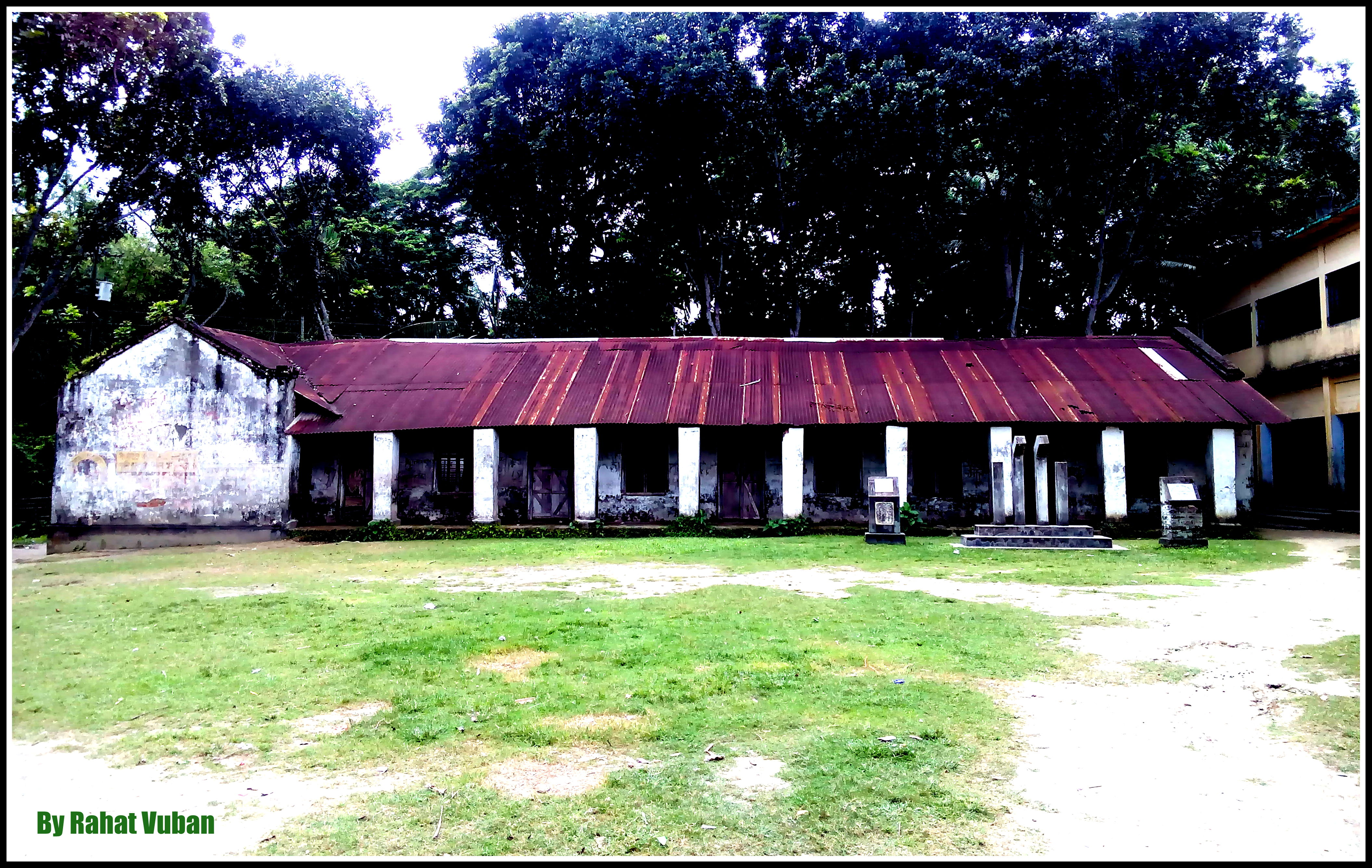
Old School Building

Contributing to the overall assurance of the meeting according to the local people a high school was established in the year of 1939 beside Dhakuria Marker. In the same year the school was well recognized by the University of Calcutta.

Babu Probodh Kumar Mitra was the Headmaster of this school and unfortunately he was killed by Pakistani Soldiers on 7 May 1971. The place was Monirampur Bazar.

Babu Gopal Chandra Mandal was the second Head Master of Dhakuria Protapkati ML High School.

== Headmasters ==
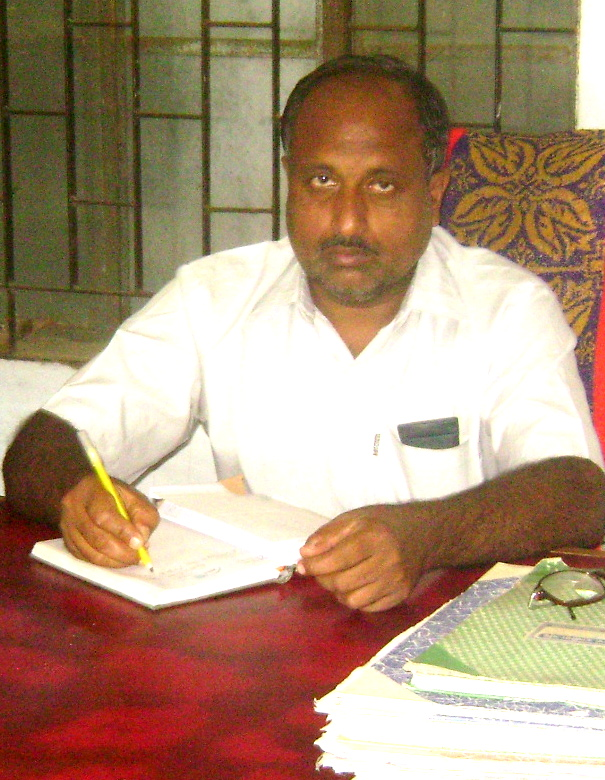
Abdul Jabbar

After the retirement of Babu Apurba Kumar Mitra, the son of Babu Probodh Kumar Mitra was the third headmaster in the year of 2000. After his sudden death in February 2003, by the decision of school administrators, assistant headmaster Abdul Jabbar was appointed as the fourth headmaster of the school on 1 June 2004.

The total number of student is 525 and Jabbar is now successful in maintaining his responsibilities with the help of 20 teachers and staff. The results of SSC and JSC are satisfactory.

There are Science, Arts and Commerce Department available for students. There are a library with 20,000+ books on different subjects and topics. The library is 100% free for all and well maintained by BRAC.
