= Chaluahati Union =

Chaluahati Union চালুয়াহাটি ইউনিয়ন
- Union
- Chaluahati Union
- Country: Bangladesh
- Division: Khulna
- District: Jessore
- Upazila: Manirampur

Area
  - Total: 71.25 km^{2} (27.51 sq mi)

Population (2011)
  - Total: 25,376
  - Density: 356.2/km^{2} (922.4/sq mi)
- Time zone: UTC+6 (BST)
- Website: chaluahatiup.jessore.gov.bd

Chaluahati Union (Bengali: চালুয়াহাটি ইউনিয়ন) is a Union Parishad under Manirampur Upazila of Jessore District in the division of Khulna, Bangladesh. It has an area of 27.51 square kilometres and a population of 25,529.
