= Kashimnagar Union =

Union in Khulna, Bangladesh

Kashimnagar Union কাশিমনগর ইউনিয়ন
- Union
- Kashimnagar Union
- Country: Bangladesh
- Division: Khulna
- District: Jessore
- Upazila: Manirampur
- Time zone: UTC+6 (BST)
- Website: kashimnagarup.jessore.gov.bd

Kashimnagar Union (Bengali: কাশিমনগর ইউনিয়ন) is a Union Parishad under Manirampur Upazila of Jessore District in the division of Khulna, Bangladesh.
