= Dhakuria Union =

Union in Khulna, Bangladesh

Dhakuria Union ঢাকুরিয়া ইউনিয়ন
- Union
- Dhakuria Union
- Country: Bangladesh
- Division: Khulna
- District: Jessore
- Upazila: Manirampur

Area
  - Total: 38.07 km^{2} (14.70 sq mi)

Population (2011)
  - Total: 23,906
  - Density: 627.9/km^{2} (1,626/sq mi)
- Time zone: UTC+6 (BST)
- Website: dhakuriaup.jessore.gov.bd

Dhakuria Union (Bengali: ঢাকুরিয়া ইউনিয়ন) is a Union Parishad under Manirampur Upazila of Jessore District in the division of Khulna, Bangladesh. It has an area of 14.70 square kilometres and a population of 23,906.

== See also ==
- Gabukhali
