= Khanpur Union, Manirampur =

Union in Khulna, Bangladesh

Khanpur Union খানপুর ইউনিয়ন
- Union
- Khanpur Union
- Country: Bangladesh
- Division: Khulna
- District: Jessore
- Upazila: Manirampur

Area
  - Total: 25.90 km^{2} (10.00 sq mi)

Population (2011)
  - Total: 25,529
  - Density: 985.7/km^{2} (2,553/sq mi)
- Time zone: UTC+6 (BST)
- Website: khanpurup.jessore.gov.bd

Khanpur Union (Bengali: খানপুর ইউনিয়ন) is a Union Parishad under Manirampur Upazila of Jessore District in the division of Khulna, Bangladesh. It has an area of 10 square kilometres and a population of 25,529.
