= Maswimnagar Union =

Union in Khulna, Bangladesh

Maswimnagar Union মশ্বিমনগর ইউনিয়ন
- Union
- Maswimnagar Union
- Country: Bangladesh
- Division: Khulna
- District: Jessore
- Upazila: Manirampur

Area
  - Total: 79.64 km^{2} (30.75 sq mi)

Population (2011)
  - Total: 30,114
  - Density: 378.1/km^{2} (979.3/sq mi)
- Time zone: UTC+6 (BST)
- Website: maswimnagarup.jessore.gov.bd

Maswimnagar Union (Bengali: মশ্বিমনগর ইউনিয়ন) is a Union Parishad under Manirampur Upazila of Jessore District in the division of Khulna, Bangladesh. It has an area of 30.75 square kilometres and a population of 30,114.
