= Manirampur Union =

Union in Khulna, Bangladesh

Manirampur Union মনিরামপুর ইউনিয়ন
- Union
- Manirampur Union
- Country: Bangladesh
- Division: Khulna
- District: Jessore
- Upazila: Manirampur

Area
  - Total: 30.67 km^{2} (11.84 sq mi)

Population (2011)
  - Total: 14,179
  - Density: 462.3/km^{2} (1,197/sq mi)
- Time zone: UTC+6 (BST)
- Website: manirampurup.jessore.gov.bd

Manirampur Union (Bengali: মনিরামপুর ইউনিয়ন) is a Union Parishad under Manirampur Upazila of Jessore District in the division of Khulna, Bangladesh. It has an area of 11.84 square kilometres and a population of 14,179.
