= Monoharpur Union, Manirampur =

Union in Khulna, Bangladesh

Monoharpur Union মনোহরপুর ইউনিয়ন
- Union
- Monoharpur Union
- Country: Bangladesh
- Division: Khulna
- District: Jessore
- Upazila: Manirampur
- Time zone: UTC+6 (BST)
- Website: manoharpurup.jessore.gov.bd

Monoharpur Union (Bengali: মনোহরপুর ইউনিয়ন) is a Union Parishad under Manirampur Upazila of Jessore District in the division of Khulna, Bangladesh.
