= Shyamkur Union =

Union in Khulna, Bangladesh

Shyamkur Union শ্যামকুড় ইউনিয়ন
- Union
- Shyamkur Union
- Country: Bangladesh
- Division: Khulna
- District: Jessore
- Upazila: Manirampur

Area
  - Total: 75.11 km^{2} (29.00 sq mi)

Population (2011)
  - Total: 32,475
  - Density: 432.4/km^{2} (1,120/sq mi)
- Time zone: UTC+6 (BST)
- Website: shyamkurup.jessore.gov.bd

Shyamkur Union (Bengali: শ্যামকুড় ইউনিয়ন) is a Union Parishad under Manirampur Upazila of Jessore District in the division of Khulna, Bangladesh. It has an area of 29 square kilometres and a population of 32,475.
