= Haridaskati Union =

Union in Khulna, Bangladesh

Haridaskati Union হরিদাসকাটি ইউনিয়ন
- Union
- Haridaskati Union
- Country: Bangladesh
- Division: Khulna
- District: Jessore
- Upazila: Manirampur

Area
  - Total: 76.53 km^{2} (29.55 sq mi)

Population (2011)
  - Total: 21,678
  - Density: 283.3/km^{2} (733.6/sq mi)
- Time zone: UTC+6 (BST)
- Website: haridaskatiup.jessore.gov.bd

Haridaskati Union (Bengali: হরিদাসকাটি ইউনিয়ন) is a Union Parishad under Manirampur Upazila of Jessore District in the division of Khulna, Bangladesh. It has an area of 29.55 square kilometres and a population of 21,678.

== Demography ==
Religions in Haridaskati Union (2022)
| Religion | Percent |
| Hinduism | 57.25% |
| Islam | 42.6% |
| Other or not stated | 0.14% |
