= Muhammad Wakkas =

Bangladeshi politician (1952–2021)

Mufti Muhammad Wakkas
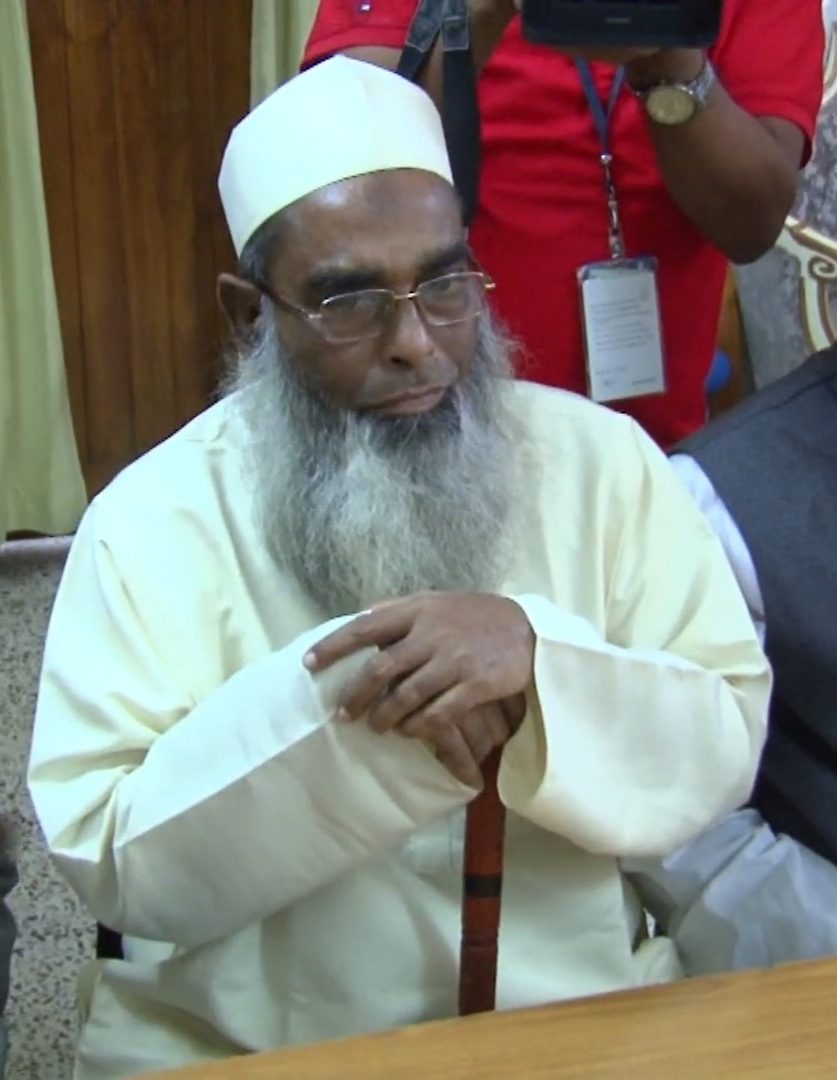

Member of 3rd/4th Jatiya Sangsad
- In office 1986–1991
- President: Hussain Muhammad Ershad
- Succeeded by: Khan Tipu Sultan

Minister of Religious Affairs
- In office 1 August 1986 – 28 August 1988
- President: Hussain Muhammad Ershad
- Preceded by: Abdul Mannan
- Succeeded by: Shamsul Islam

Secretary-General of Jamiat Ulema-e-Islam
- In office 1991–2016
- Preceded by: Shamsuddin Qasemi
- Succeeded by: Nur Hossain Kasemi

Member of 8th Jatiya Sangsad
- In office 2001–2006
- Prime Minister: Khaleda Zia
- Preceded by: Khan Tipu Sultan
- Succeeded by: Khan Tipu Sultan

Personal details
- Party: Jamiat Ulema-e-Islam Bangladesh; Jatiya Party (1986-1996); Islami Oikya Jote (1991); Bangladesh Nationalist Party (2001-2008)

Personal life
- Born: 15 January 1952 Bijayrampur, Jessore District, East Bengal, Pakistan
- Died: 31 March 2021 (aged 69) Dhaka, Bangladesh
- Education: Darul Uloom Deoband

Religious life
- Religion: Islam
- Denomination: Sunni
- Jurisprudence: Hanafi
- Movement: Deobandi

Muslim leader
- Teacher: Qazi Mu'tasim Billah

Muhammad Wakkas (15 January 1952 – 31 March 2021) was a Bangladeshi Islamic scholar, teacher, former Member of Parliament and State Minister. He was the founder of Jamia Imdadia Madaninagar Madrasa, the largest madrasa in South Bengal, accommodating roughly 2000 students.

== Early life and education ==
Muhammad Wakkas was born on 15 January 1952, to a Bengali Muslim family in the village of Bijayrampur in Manirampur, Jessore District, East Bengal. He was the youngest child of Muhammad Ismail and Nurjahan Begum.

His education began at his local primary school, where he achieved the top position in the final exams. This impressed his mother, who then enrolled him at the Lauri Ramnagar Kamil Madrasa, a noted institution of South Bengal. He memorised the entire Qur'an off by heart in three months and was the highest scorer for the Alim exam of his board in 1967. He studied for his Kamil degree at the Bahadurpur Shariatia Alia Madrasa in Madaripur and was the highest scorer for his exam board for that too, in 1971. In 1972, he completed his Higher Secondary School Certificate at the Manirampur College.

Tajammul Ali, his teacher and also the khalifa of Hussain Ahmad Madani, advised him to study at the Darul Uloom Deoband in North India. He remained in Deoband for four years, topped the exams for Mawquf Alayhi (1973), Takmil-e-Ulum-e-Diniyat (1975) and Ifta (1976), and gained the title of Mufti.

== Career ==
=== Political career ===
Wakkas was involved in politics during his time as a student, where his teacher often took him to Jamiat Ulema-e-Islam programmes. Whilst studying for his Kamil degree at Bahadurpur, Wakkas was elected as the vice-president of the Bahadurpur branch of Jamiat-e-Talaba-e-Arabia. After the independence of Bangladesh, he became the Nazim of Jamiat Ulema-e-Islam Bangladesh's Khulna branch. On Jamiat's decision, Wakkas briefly joined the Bangladesh Khilafat Andolan, founded by Hafezzi Huzur in 1981, but later left it to return to Jamiat.

Wakkas was advised by Shamsuddin Qasimi to participate in the 1986 Bangladeshi general election as a Jatiya Party candidate. In this election, he successfully gained a seat at the Jessore-5 constituency. He kept this seat after the 1988 Bangladeshi general election. During his first term as a Member of Parliament, Wakkas also served as the country's Minister of Religious Affairs. He also later served as the whip.

After the fall of Ershad's Jatiya Party, Wakkas stood for the 1991 Bangladeshi general elections as a candidate under the Islami Oikya Jote alliance. He was unsuccessful in gaining a seat in this election, losing to Khan Tipu Sultan of the Awami League. It was also in this year that the Jamiat Ulema-e-Islam Bangladesh had appointed him as secretary-general during their National Council at Arzabad Madrasa.

At the June 1996 Bangladeshi general election, he stood up once more as Jatiya Party candidate but failed to defeat Khan Tipu Sultan. He later joined the Bangladesh Nationalist Party, and was elected to parliament following the 2001 Bangladeshi general election, where he received 20,000 more votes than his rival Khan Tipu Sultan. However, Sultan managed to defeat Wakkas in the 2008 Bangladeshi general election.

=== Educational career ===
In 1982, Wakkas established the Jamia Imdadia Madaninagar Madrasa in Manirampur. 7 years later, he founded a female branch of the madrasa. The faculty of Hadith studies began in 1995, and for females in 2003. In 2009, the institution became the largest madrasa in South Bengal after the opening of its Ifta department. He was a member of Hefazat-e-Islam Bangladesh.

== Death and legacy ==
Wakkas died on 31 March 2021 at a hospital in Dhaka.

== See also ==
- Abul Hasan Jashori
- Qazi Mu'tasim Billah
