= Swapan Bhattacharjee =

Bangladeshi politician

- স্বপন ভট্টাচার্য্য
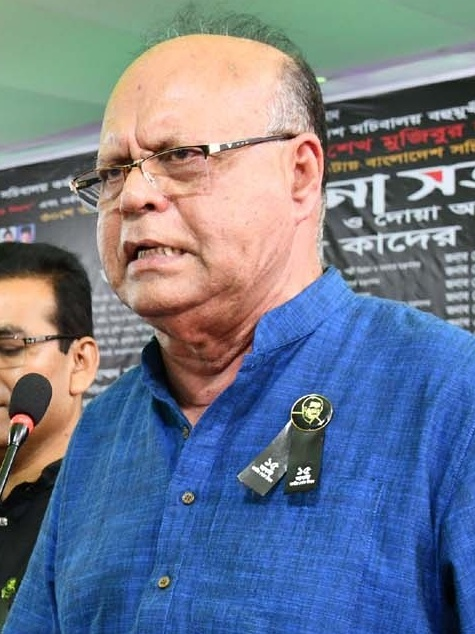
- Bhattacharjee in 2023

Minister of State for Local Government, Rural Development and Co-operatives
- In office 20 May 2019 – 10 January 2024
- Prime Minister: Sheikh Hasina
- Preceded by: Mashiur Rahaman Ranga
- Succeeded by: Mir Shahe Alam

Member of the Bangladesh Parliament for Jessore-5
- In office 25 January 2014 – 7 January 2024
- Preceded by: Khan Tipu Sultan
- Succeeded by: Mohammad Yakub Ali

Personal details
- Born: 2 February 1952 (age 74) Jessore, East Bengal, Dominion of Pakistan
- Party: Bangladesh Awami League
- Relatives: Pijush Kanti Bhattacharjee (brother)

Swapan Bhattacharjee (born 2 February 1952) is a Bangladesh Awami League politician and the former Jatiya Sangsad member from Jessore-5 constituency. His brother Pijush Kanti Bhattacharjee was a former member of parliament.

== Career ==
Bhattacharjee was elected to Jatiya Sangsad on 5 January 2014 from Jessore-5 as an independent candidate. He defeated the incumbent Bangladesh Awami League candidate Khan Tipu Sultan by more than 20 thousand votes.
