= Khan Tipu Sultan =

Bangladeshi politician

- খান টিপু সুলতান

Member of Parliament for Jessore-5
- In office 1991–2001
- Preceded by: Muhammad Wakkas
- In office 2009–2014
- Succeeded by: Swapan Bhattacharjee

Personal details
- Born: 13 December 1950 Khulna District, East Bengal, Dominion of Pakistan
- Died: 19 August 2017 (aged 66) Dhaka, Bangladesh
- Party: Bangladesh Awami League

Khan Tipu Sultan (13 December 1950 – 19 August 2017) was a Bangladesh Awami League politician and three time Jatiya Sangsad member for the Jessore-5 constituency.

== Early life ==
Sultan was born in Dhamalia, Dumuria Upazila, Khulna District in the then East Bengal, Pakistan. He studied at the Sanmilani Institution in Jessore. He served as the general secretary of the Jessore District unit of the Bangladesh Chhatra League.

== Career ==
Sultan was involved in the 1969 student protests. He also led protests against Nurul Amin visiting Jessore. He was sued by the military government of Pakistan and imprisoned. He was released after Sheikh Mujibur Rahman asked General Yahya Khan to release him following the 1970 general elections in Pakistan. He was elected to parliament from Jessore-5 in 1991, 1996, and in 2008 as a Bangladesh Awami League candidate.

== Personal life and death ==
Sultan was married to Jesmin Ara Begum and had two sons - Humayun Sultan (Shadab) and Jubaer Sultan (Pelob). In November 2014, Sultan and Jesmin went into hiding after a murder case was filed against them in connection with the death of their daughter-in-law, Shamarukh Mahjabin, in their house in Dhanmondi. According to her husband Humayun, Mahjabin committed suicide.

Sultan died on 19 August 2017 in Central Hospital in Dhaka. He was buried in Dhamalia.
