= Manirampur Upazila =

Manirampur মণিরামপুর
- Upazila
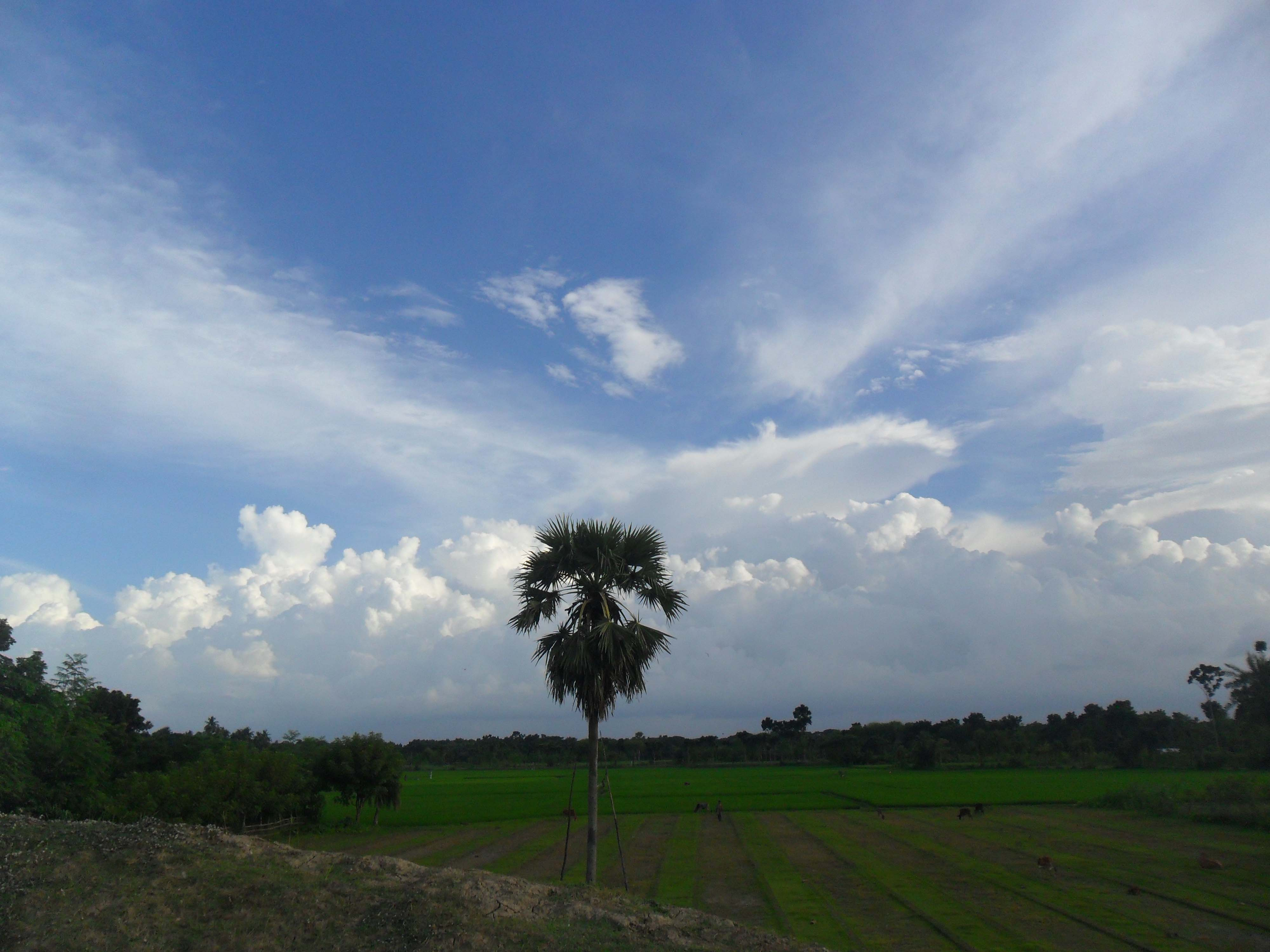
- Fields in Manirampur Upazila

- Coordinates: 23°1′N 89°14′E
- Country: Bangladesh
- Division: Khulna
- District: Jashore

Area
  - Total: 444.20 km^{2} (171.51 sq mi)

Population (2022)
  - Total: 454,541
  - Density: 1,023.3/km^{2} (2,650.3/sq mi)
- Time zone: UTC+6 (BST)
- Postal code: 7440
- Area code: 04227

Manirampur (Bengali: মণিরামপুর) is an upazila of Jashore District in Khulna Division, Bangladesh. It is bounded by Jashore Sadar Upazila on the north, Kalaroa and Jhikargachha upazilas on the west, Abhaynagar Upazila on the east, and Dumuria and Keshabpur upazilas on the south.

Manirampur Upazila mauza geocode map

== During 1971 ==
Shaheed Asaduzzaman Asad, younger brother of Poet and Professor of Dhaka University Muhammad Moniruzzaman from Chinatola village was killed 23 October during the 1971. He was buried in Chinatola, near Chinatola bridge on the bank of Harihar river. Not only Asad, but also Sirajul Islam Shanti, Mashikur Rahman Tojo, Ahsan Uddin Khan Manik, Fazlur Rahman Fazlu were killed at the same time, same Place and they all are buried in a grave together.

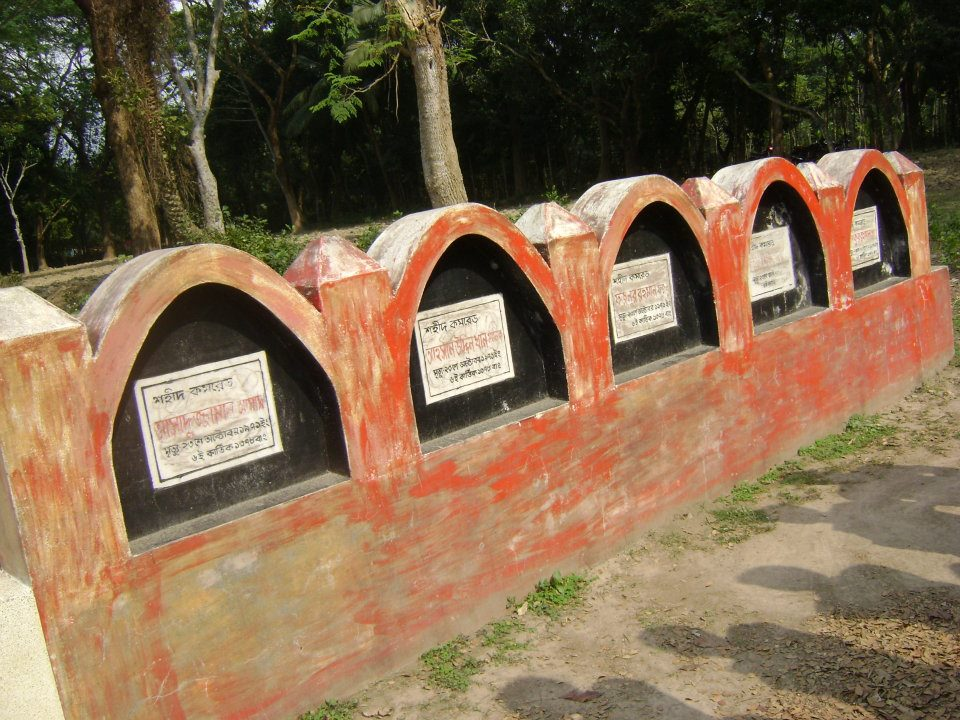
Grave of Asad, Manik, Fazlu, Shanti, Tojo in Manirampur Upazila

=== 1971 Liberation War ===
Manirampur thana was controlled by Sector 8 of the Bangladesh Armed Forces during the 1971 Bangladesh Liberation War.

== Geography ==
Manirampur is located at 23.0167°N 89.2333°E. Manirampur is the second largest upazila of Bangladesh with an area of 444.20 square kilometres (171.5 sq mi). Important low-lying areas include the Jhealdaha, Kedaria, Monaharpur and Moshihati beels. The main rivers in Manirampur are the Harihar and Vodra rivers. It is situated 12 miles (19 km) from the district town.

== Demographics ==
Religions in Manirampur Upazila (2022)
Religion	Percent
Islam	83.54%
Hinduism	16.40%
Other or not stated	0.06%

Population by religion in Union/Paurashava
Union/Paurashava	Muslim	Hindu	Others
Manirampur Paurashava	24,067	6,896	18
Bhojgati Union	14,091	1,142	3
Chaluahati Union	27,810	1,922	17
Dhakuria Union	21,620	6,189	5
Durbadanga Union	17,132	8,283	6
Haridaskati Union	10,508	14,121	35
Hariharnagar Union	26,469	984	0
Jhanpa Union	27,077	2,022	1
Kashimnagar Union	15,422	2,051	6
Khanpur Union	32,009	1,914	27
Khedapara Union	26,035	3,241	45
Kultia Union	8,436	9,646	8
Manirampur Union	12,680	871	13
Monoharpur Union	8,132	4,677	8
Maswimnagar Union	29,189	1,849	22
Nehalpur Union	12,248	3,172	3
Rohita Union	30,551	2,310	64
Shyamkur Union	36,219	3,245	5

🟩 Muslim majority 🟧 Hindu majority

According to the 2022 Bangladeshi census, Manirampur Upazila had 118,325 households and a population of 454,541. 7.99% of the population were under 5 years of age. Manirampur had a literacy rate (age 7 and over) of 74.19%: 77.19% for males and 71.33% for females, and a sex ratio of 96.43 males for every 100 females. 57,455 (12.64%) lived in urban areas.

As of the 2011 Census of Bangladesh, Manirampur upazila had 101,239 households and a population of 417,421. 81,932 (19.63%) were under 10 years of age. Manirampur had an average literacy rate of 53.66%, compared to the national average of 51.8%, and a sex ratio of 1018 females per 1000 males. 28,138 (6.74%) of the population lived in urban areas. Ethnic population was 5,117 (1.23%).

As the census of 1991, the total population of Manirampur was 326,093. Males constitute 51% of the population and females 49%. The density of population was 733/km^{2}. The total people of eighteen years or older (18 or 18+) was 168,903 and the total number of households was 59,615. Manirampur had an average literacy rate of 29.1% (for people seven years or older), compared with the national average of 32.4%.

Only Town Population:

Only the Manirampur town had a population of 18874 as the census of 1991 where males are 52.36% and females are 47.64% of the town people. The density of town population was 1644/km^{2} and the literacy rate of town people was 43.3%.

== Administration ==
Manirampur thana was turned into an upazila in 1983. Manirampur Municipality was formed on 10 November 1997.

Manirampur Upazila is divided into Manirampur Municipality and 17 union parishads: Bhojgati, Chaluahati, Dhakuria, Durbadanga, Haridaskati, Hariharnagar, Jhanpa, Kashimnagar, Khanpur, Khedapara, Kultia, Manirampur, Manoharpur, Maswimnagar, Nehalpur, Rohita, and Shyamkur. The union parishads are subdivided into 246 mauzas and 235 villages.

=== Political history ===
The upazila's members of parliament (MP) were:

- Pijush Kanti Bhattacharya (AL), beginning in 1973, who is the current Presidium Member of central Awami League.
- Afsar Siddiqui (BNP), beginning in 1979
- Mufti Wakkas (JP), beginning in 1986
- Khan Tipu Sultan (AL), beginning in 1991
  - Again in 1996 (AL)
- Mufti Wakkas (Jamat-e-Ulamai Islam), beginning in 2001
- Khan Tipu Sultan (AL), beginning in 2008
- Swapon Kumar Bhattyacharya (Ind) beginning in 2014
  - Again in 2019 (AL)
- Mohammad Yakub Ali (Ind) beginning in 2024

The upazila has produced one government minister, Sarat Chandra Majumdar (1955–58) on the ticket of the Pakistan National congress, and one state minister of religious affairs, Mufti Wakkas, who held office under Hussain Muhammad Ershad.

== Points of interest ==
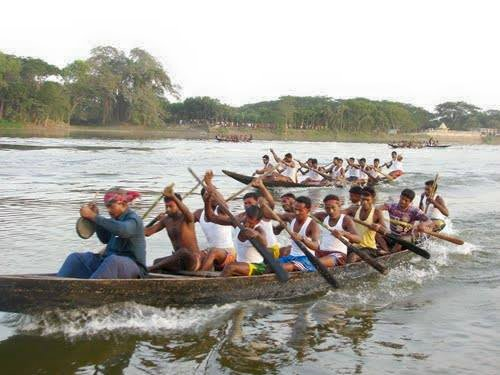
Boat race in Jhanpa Baor, Manirampur

The most notable place to see in Manirampur is Vabodah Sluis Gate and Jhapa (Rajgong) Baor. The Kapatakkha River also flows beside this area.

=== Archaeological sights ===
A terracotta plaque bearing the image of Mallinath, a female tirthankar (saint) of the Jain religion, was found at the Mound of Dam Dam Peer in Manirampur Upazila.

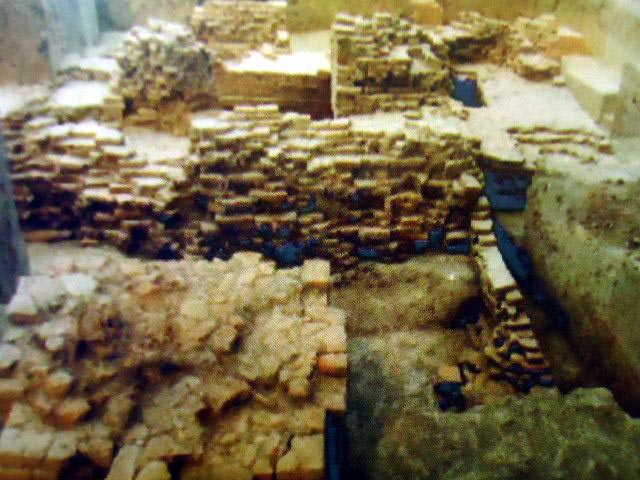
Mound of Dam Dam Peer in Manirampur Upazila

It is believed to be the most ancient relic discovered from this part of the world. The Department at Khulna said that the plaque is at least 1800 years old. It is currently kept at the Khulna Museum.

Besides, "Neelkuthi" at village Joypur & "Kachari Ghar" are important Archaeological sites in Manirampur.

== Education ==
Educational institutions include Manirampur Government High School and Dhakuria Protapkati Secondary School.

== Notable people ==
- Muhammad Wakkas, former Minister of Religious Affairs and Member of Parliament
- Swapan Bhattacharjee, State Minister of Rural Development and Cooperatives Division

== See also ==
- Upazilas of Bangladesh
- Jessore District
- Khulna Division
