= Afsar Ahmad Siddiqui =

Bangladesh politician

- আফসার আহমদ সিদ্দিকী

Member of Parliament from Extinct Jessore-8
- In office 1979–1982

Member of Parliament from Jessore-5
- In office 15 February 1996 – June 1996

Personal details
- Born: 15 March 1935 Jessore
- Died: 12 October 2001 (aged 66) Jessore
- Party: Bangladesh Nationalist Party
- Spouse: Faizunessa Siddiqui
- Relations: Islam
- Education: University of Dhaka

Afsar Ahmad Siddiqui (15 March 1935 – 12 October 2001) was a Bangladesh Nationalist Party politician and a former member of parliament of the now extinct Jessore-8 constituency, and also for the Jessore-5 constituency.

== Birth and early life ==
Afsar Ahmad Siddiqui was born in the house of late Kaiser Ahmed Siddiqui in Jessore District on 15 March 1935.

== Career ==
Siddiqui was elected to parliament from the extinct Jessore-8 as a Bangladesh Nationalist Party candidate in 1979 and Jessore-5 15 February 1996.

== Death ==
Afsar Ahmad Siddiqui died on 12 October 2001.

== See also ==
- Jatiya Sangsad
- 1979 Bangladeshi general election
