= Mohammad Yakub Ali =

Bangladeshi politician

Member of the Bangladesh Parliament for Jessore-5
- In office 10 January 2024 – 6 August 2024
- Preceded by: Swapan Bhattacharjee

Personal details
- Born: Jessore
- Party: Independent

Mohammad Yakub Ali (born 8 April 1969) is a Bangladeshi politician and a former Jatiya Sangsad member representing the Jessore-5 constituency. As an independent candidate he won with the "Eagle" symbol.
