= 2023 Barishal City Corporation election =

Mayoral election in Bangladesh

- 12 June 2023
- Registered: 276,298 (▲14.19 pp)
- Turnout: 51.46% (▼6.09 pp)
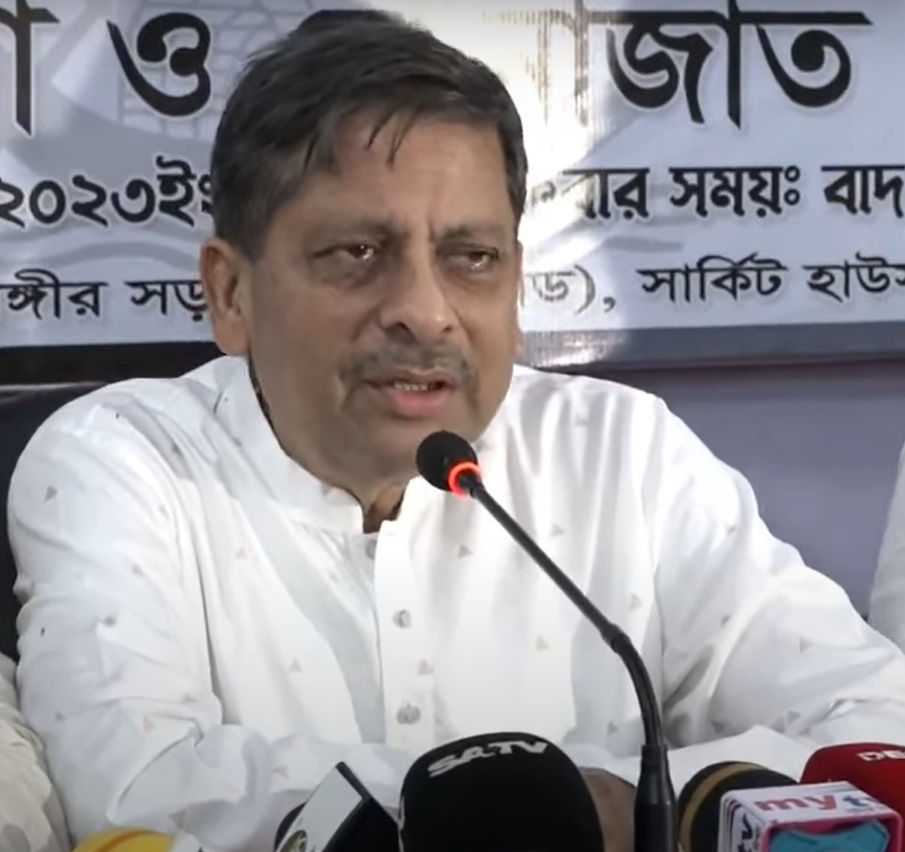

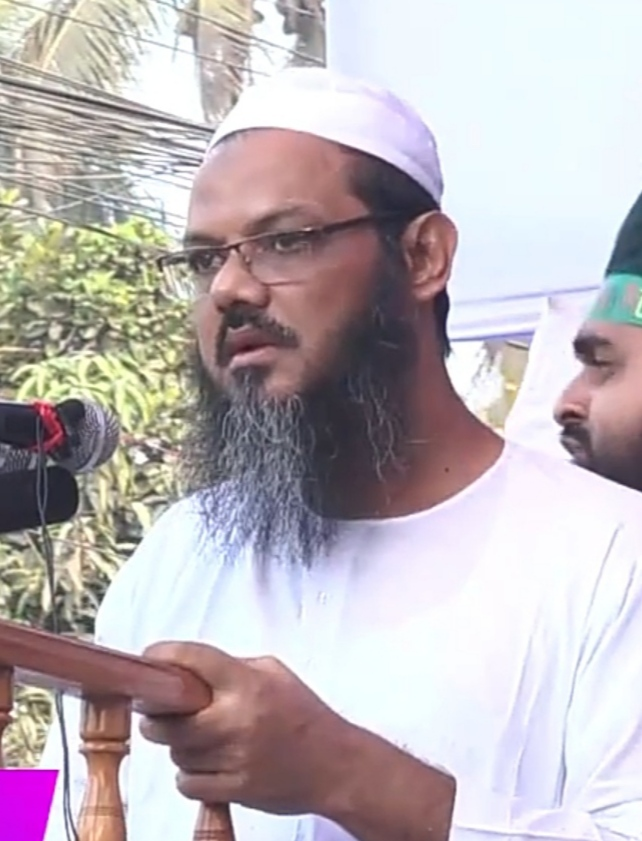
	First party	Second party
Candidate	Abul Khair Abdullah	Syed Faizul Karim
Party	AL	IAB
Popular vote	87,752	34,345
Percentage	62.99%	24.62%
Swing	▼15.92pp	New
Mayor before election
Serniabat Sadiq Abdullah
AL
Elected Mayor
Abul Khair Abdullah
AL
- Council election
- 12 June 2023; 40 seats in the Barisal City Corporation
Party	Leader	Seats	+/–
AL	Abul Khair Abdullah	29	+22
BNP	Didn't contest	9	+5
Jamaat	—	1	+1
JP(E)	—	0	−1
Independent	—	1	−7
This lists parties that won seats. See the complete results below.

The 2023 Barishal City Corporation election was a local government election in the city of Barisal, Bangladesh, held on 12 June 2023 to elect the Mayor of Barisal and the Barishal City Council. The election resulted in a victory for the Awami League candidate Abul Khair Abdullah. In the 40-member City Council, the Awami League won 29 seats, while the Bangladesh Nationalist Party won 9 seats, Bangladesh Jamaat-e-Islami won 1 seat, and independents won 1 seat. A total of 276,298 people cast their votes in 894 rooms of 126 polling stations in the election.

== Background ==
City corporations, or city councils, are the highest tier among the local councils of Bangladesh—usually composed of cities or metropolitan areas. Elections are held every five years to elect the mayors and ward councilors. Wards are moreover divided administrative parts of a city, and the number of wards in a city depends on the total administrative area. Ward councilors are elected for each ward by their ward residents. For every 3 wards, there is a reserved seat for women in the general council, they are also elected by the people. But the mayoral elections has been way more politically important and prioritized by both voters and political analysts.

The Barishal City Corporation (BCC) is one of the 12 City Corporations in Bangladesh. It comprises the metropolitan Barisal. It is further divided into 30 wards. The body was known as Barisal Municipality previously, until it obtained the city corporation status by a ministry of local government declaration on 25 July 2002.

=== Previous election ===
In the last election, Serniabat Sadiq Abdullah was elected as mayor of the Barisal City Corporation in 2018 city election. The election was boycotted by the candidates of Communist Party of Bangladesh and Islami Andolon Bangladesh who alleged vote rigging.

== Schedule ==
The schedule of the election was announced by the Election Commission of Bangladesh on 29 March 2023.

Event	Date	Day
Date of notification	3 April 2023	Monday
Deadline for submission of nomination paper	16 May 2023	Tuesday
Date for scrutiny of nominations	18 May 2023	Thursday
Appeal against the nomination paper scrutiny	19–21 May 2023	
Appeal resolve	22–24 May 2023	
Last date for withdrawal of candidatures	25 May 2023	Thursday
Symbols distribution	26 May 2023	Friday
Date of poll & counting	12 June 2023	Monday

== Candidates ==
=== Mayoral election ===
A total of 7 candidates were contested for the mayoral post.

Name	Election Symbol	Party	Ref.
Abul Khair Abdullah	Nouka (Boat)	Bangladesh Awami League	
Syed Faizul Karim	Hatpakha (Hand fan)	Islami Andolon Bangladesh	
Iqbal Hossain Taposh	Langol (Plough)	Jatiya Party (Ershad)	
Mizanur Rahman Bachchu	Golap ful (Rose)	Zaker Party	
Kamrul Ahsan	Ghori (Clock)	Independent	
Asaduzzaman	Hati (Elephant)	Independent	
Ali Hossain	Horin (Deer)	Independent	

=== Council election ===
Total of 116 and 42 were contested for 30 general and 10 reserved (women) seats in the city council, respectively. Symbols have been distributed to 115 out of 116 vying for the posts of councillors of 30 wards. As there is one candidate in ward-7, no symbol has been allotted.

== Incidents ==
=== Election boycott ===
In a press conference on 26 April 2023, BaSad leader Manisha Chakraborty boycotted the upcoming city election.

=== Violence ===
Islami Andolan Bangladesh brought out a march by its followers with sticks and rods, which was widely criticized on social media.

Islami Andolan candidate Syed Faizul Karim alleged that some 30–40 boat symbol supporters attacked them with sticks near Hatim Ali College after they left Sabera Khatun Girls' Secondary School polling centre.

In a press briefing at the Nirbachan Bhaban on election day afternoon, Election Commissioner Ahsan Habib Khan assured that orders have already been issued to apprehend those involved in the assault on Faizul.

== Mayoral election ==
Abul Khair Abdullah was elected as mayor of the Barishal City Corporation by defeating Islami Andolan candidate Syed Faizul Karim.

Candidate	Party	Votes	%
Abul Khair Abdullah	Bangladesh Awami League	87,752	62.99
Syed Faizul Karim	Islami Andolan Bangladesh	34,345	24.65
Kamrul Ahsan	Independent	7,999	5.74
Iqbal Hossain Taposh	Jatiya Party (Ershad)	6,665	4.78
Mizanur Rahman Bachchu	Zaker Party	2,546	1.83
Total		139,307	100.00
Valid votes		139,307	97.98
Invalid/blank votes		2,870	2.02
Total votes		142,177	100.00
Registered voters/turnout		276,298	51.46

== Council election ==
=== Party-wise ===
2023 BCC council election results (party-wise)
Party	Seats		
Party	Ward Councilors	Reserved Women Councilors	Total Councilors
Bangladesh Awami League	21	8	29
Bangladesh Nationalist Party	7	2	9
Bangladesh Jamaat-e-Islami	1	—	1
Independent	1	—	1
Total	30	10	40

== Aftermath ==
Islami Andolan Bangladesh rejected the results of Barishal and Khulna City Corporation elections over alleged irregularities and assault on a candidate. They also boycotted the upcoming city elections in Rajshahi and Sylhet.

BNP Secretary General Mirza Fakhrul Islam Alamgir criticizes attack on Islami Andolan candidate Syed Faizul Karim during elections and said it has been proved once again that credible elections are never possible under the current illegal government. Fakhrul strongly denounced the incident and blamed the ruling party cadres for it.

In a press briefing, Jatiya Party candidate Iqbal Hossain Taposh commented that BNP's decision to boycott election was right and also condemned the attack on the mayoral candidate of the Islami Andolan and demanded speedy justice.

== See also ==
- 2023 Bangladeshi urban local elections
- 2023 elections in Bangladesh
