= Seral =

Seral সেরাল
- Village
- Location in Bangladesh
- Coordinates: 22°56′N 90°12′E
- Country: Bangladesh
- Division: Barisal Division
- District: Barisal District
- Upazila: Agailjhara Upazila

Area
  - Total: 2.44 km^{2} (0.94 sq mi)

Population (2022)
  - Total: 2,847
  - Density: 1,170/km^{2} (3,020/sq mi)
- Time zone: UTC+6 (Bangladesh Time)

Seral is a village in Agailjhara Upazila of Barisal District in the Barisal Division of southern-central Bangladesh.

According to the 2022 Census of Bangladesh, Seral had 688 households and a population of 2,847. It has a total area of 2.44 km^{2} (0.94 sq mi).

== Notable people ==
- Abdur Rab Serniabat
- Abul Hasanat Abdullah
- Abul Khair Abdullah
- Serniabat Sadiq Abdullah
