= 2023 Bangladeshi local elections =

2023 Bangladeshi city corporation elections
← 2022	25 May (Gazipur), 12 June (Khulna & Barishal), 21 June (Rajshahi & Sylhet)

5 out of 12 City Corporation
	Majority party	Minority party
Party	AL	BNP
Seats before	10	1
Seats after	9	0
Seat change	▼1	▼1
Seats up	4	1
Seats won	4	0

City Corporation elections in 2023 will be held in Gazipur, Khulna, Barishal, Rajshahi and Sylhet as their terms expire this year.

== Gazipur ==
2023 Gazipur City Corporation election
← 2018	25 May 2023	2028 →
- Registered: 1,179,486
- Turnout: 48.75%
Candidate	Jayeda Khatun	Azmat Ullah Khan
Party	Independent	AL
Popular vote	238,934	222,736
Percentage	41.68%	38.85%
Mayor before election
Asadur Rahman Kiron
AL
Elected Mayor
Zayeda Khatun
Independent

== Khulna ==
2023 Khulna City Corporation election
← 2018	12 June 2023	2028 →
- Registered: 535,528
Candidate	Talukder Abdul Khaleque	Abdul Awal
Party	AL	IAB
Popular vote	1,54,825	60,064
Percentage	60.38%	23.42%
Mayor before election
Talukder Abdul Khaleque
AL
Elected Mayor
Talukder Abdul Khaleque
AL

== Barishal ==
2023 Barishal City Corporation election
← 2018	12 June 2023	2028 →
- Registered: 276,298
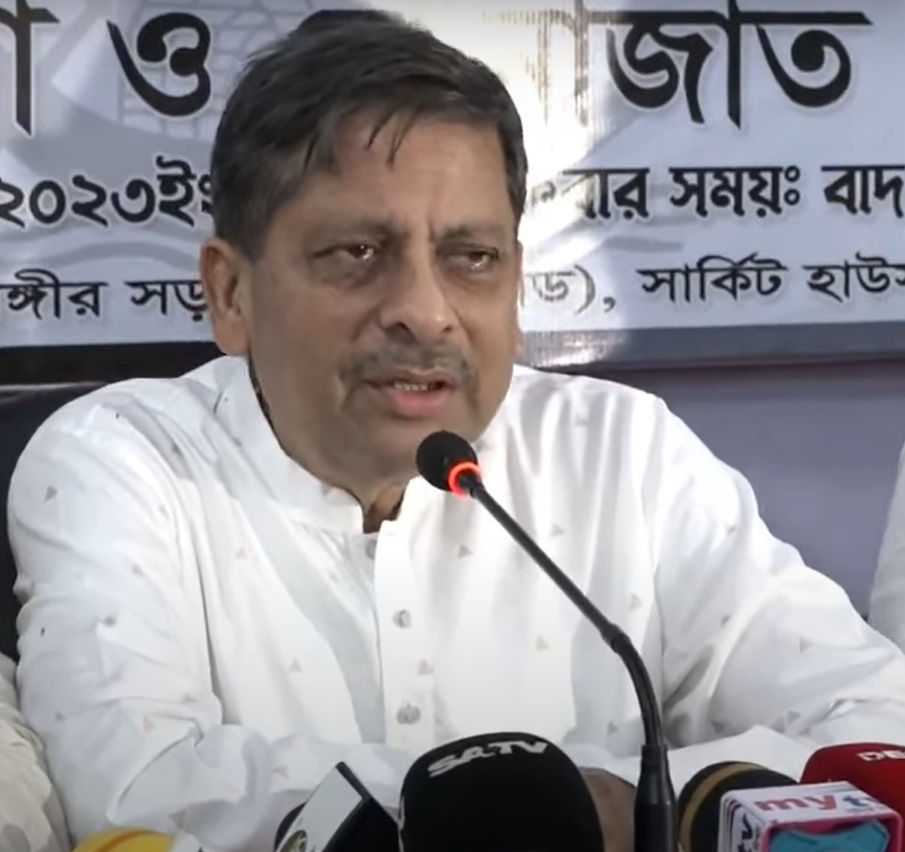

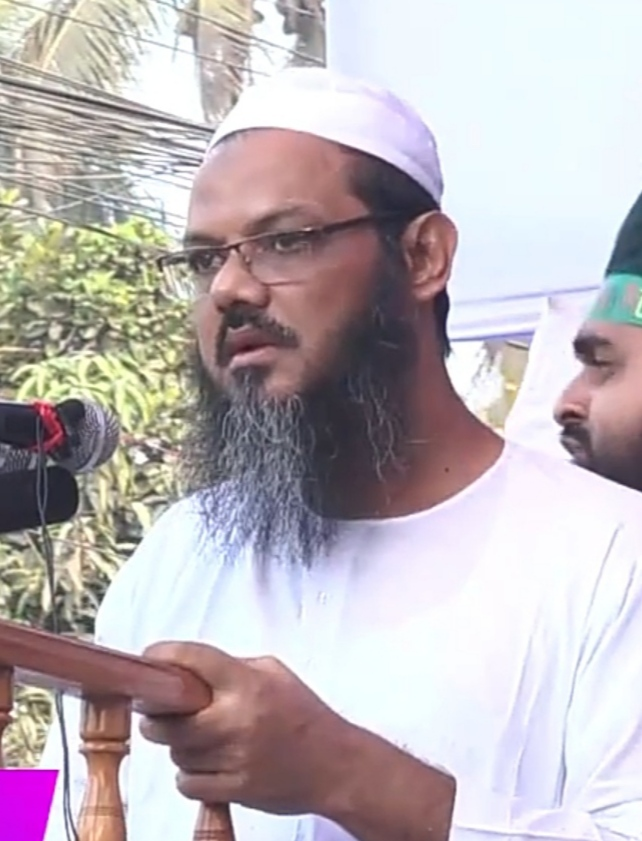
Candidate	Abul Khair Abdullah	Syed Faizul Karim
Party	AL	IAB
Popular vote	87,752	34,345
Percentage	61.72%	24.16%
Mayor before election
Serniabat Sadiq Abdullah
AL
Elected Mayor
Abul Khair Abdullah
AL

== See also ==
- 2023 elections in Bangladesh
