= 2023 elections in Bangladesh =

Elections in Bangladesh
- 2023

Elections in Bangladesh in 2023 include election to the office of the president of Bangladesh, by-elections to the Jatiya Sangsad, elections to the 5 (five) City Corporation, several municipalities and local bodies.

== Presidential election ==
The presidential election was held on 13 February 2023. AL-nominated candidate Shahabuddin Chuppu won unopposed.

Date	President before election	Party before election	Elected President	Party after election	Ref.
13 February 2023 (Note: It was scheduled for 19 February, but Chuppu was declared to be elected unopposed on 13 February 2023)	Mohammad Abdul Hamid	Bangladesh Awami League	Shahabuddin Chuppu	Bangladesh Awami League	

== Jatiya Sangsad by-elections ==
Date	Constituency		MP before election	Party before election	Elected MP	Party after election	Ref.
4 January 2023	33.	Gaibandha-5	Fazle Rabbi Miah	Bangladesh Awami League	Mahmud Hasan Ripon	Bangladesh Awami League	
1 February 2023	5.	Thakurgaon-3	Jahidur Rahman	Bangladesh Nationalist Party	Hafiz Uddin Ahmed	Jatiya Party	
1 February 2023	39.	Bogra-4	Mosharraf Hossain	Bangladesh Nationalist Party	A. K. M. Rezaul Karim Tansen	Jatiya Samajtantrik Dal	
1 February 2023	41.	Bogra-6	Golam Mohammad Siraj	Bangladesh Nationalist Party	Ragebul Ahsan Ripu	Bangladesh Awami League	
1 February 2023	44.	Chapai Nawabganj-2	Md. Aminul Islam	Bangladesh Nationalist Party	Md. Ziaur Rahman	Bangladesh Awami League	
1 February 2023	45.	Chapai Nawabganj-3	Harunur Rashid	Bangladesh Nationalist Party	Md. Abdul Odud	Bangladesh Awami League	
1 February 2023	244.	Brahmanbaria-2	Abdus Sattar Bhuiyan	Bangladesh Nationalist Party	Abdus Sattar Bhuiyan	Independent politician	
6 March 2023 (Note: It was scheduled for 20 March, but Rina was declared to be elected unopposed on 6 March 2023)	350.	Reserved Women Seat-50	Rumeen Farhana	Bangladesh Nationalist Party	Afroza Haque Rina	Jatiya Samajtantrik Dal	
27 April 2023	285.	Chittagong-8	Moslem Uddin Ahmad	Bangladesh Awami League	Noman Al Mahmud	Bangladesh Awami League	
17 July 2023	190.	Dhaka-17	Akbar Hossain Pathan Farooque	Bangladesh Awami League	Mohammad A. Arafat	Bangladesh Awami League	
30 July 2023	287.	Chittagong-10	Muhammad Afsarul Ameen	Bangladesh Awami League	Md. Mohiuddin Bacchu	Bangladesh Awami League	

== City Corporation elections ==
Date	City Corporation	Mayor before election	Party before election	Elected Mayor	Party after election	Council after election	Ref.
25 May 2023	Gazipur	Asadur Rahman Kiron (acting)	Bangladesh Awami League	Jayeda Khatun	Independent politician	AL 61 / 76 BNP 15 / 76	
12 June 2023	Khulna	Talukder Abdul Khaleque	Bangladesh Awami League	Talukder Abdul Khaleque	Bangladesh Awami League	AL 39 / 41 Jamaat 1 / 41 Independent 1 / 41	
12 June 2023	Barishal	Serniabat Sadiq Abdullah	Bangladesh Awami League	Abul Khair Abdullah	Bangladesh Awami League	AL 29 / 40 BNP 9 / 40 Jamaat 1 / 40 Independent 1 / 40	
21 June 2023	Rajshahi	A. H. M. Khairuzzaman Liton	Bangladesh Awami League	A. H. M. Khairuzzaman Liton	Bangladesh Awami League	AL 31 / 40 BNP 6 / 40 WPB 1 / 40 Independent 2 / 40	
21 June 2023	Sylhet	Ariful Haque Choudhury	Bangladesh Nationalist Party	Anwaruzzaman Chowdhury	Bangladesh Awami League	AL 41 / 56 BNP 9 / 56 Jamaat 6 / 56	

== Subdistrict Council by-elections ==
=== Comilla District ===
Date	Subdistrict Council	Position	Post-holder before election	Party before election	Elected Post-holder	Party after election	Ref.
16 March 2023	Lalmai	Chairman	Abdul Malek	Bangladesh Awami League	Kamrul Hasan Shaheen	Bangladesh Awami League	
16 March 2023	Lalmai	Vice-chairman	Mizanur Rahman Majumder	Bangladesh Awami League	Mizanur Rahman Majumder	Independent politician	
16 March 2023	Lalmai	Woman vice-chairman	Rabeya Begum	Bangladesh Awami League	Mahmuda Akhter	Independent politician	

=== Chittagong District ===
Date	Subdistrict Council	Position	Post-holder before election	Party before election	Elected Post-holder	Party after election	Ref.
16 March 2023	Boalkhali	Chairman (by-election)	Mohammad Nurul Alam	Bangladesh Awami League	Rezaul Karim Raja	Bangladesh Awami League	
25 May 2023	Sandwip	Chairman (by-election)	Mohammad Shajahan	Bangladesh Awami League	Main Uddin Mission	Bangladesh Awami League	
19 July 2023	Sandwip	Vice-chairman (by-election)	Main Uddin Mission	Bangladesh Awami League	Omar Faruk	Independent politician	

=== Narsingdi District ===
Date	Subdistrict Council	Position	Post-holder before election	Party before election	Elected Post-holder	Party after election	Ref.
28 February 2023 (Note: It was scheduled for 16 March, but Lucky was declared to be elected unopposed on 28 February 2023)	Raipura	Chairman (by-election)	Abdus Sadek	Bangladesh Awami League	Laila Kaniz Lucky	Bangladesh Awami League	

=== Barguna District ===
Date	Subdistrict Council	Position	Post-holder before election	Party before election	Elected Post-holder	Party after election	Ref.
16 March 2023	Amtali	Chairman (by-election)	Ghulam Sarwar Faruque	Independent politician	M. A. Quader Miah	Bangladesh Awami League	

=== Munshiganj District ===
Date	Subdistrict Council	Position	Post-holder before election	Party before election	Elected Post-holder	Party after election	Ref.
1 March 2023 (Note: It was scheduled for 16 March, but Wahid was declared to be elected unopposed on 1 March 2023)	Tongibari	Chairman (by-election)	Jaglul Hawladar Bhutu	Independent politician	Kazi Abdul Wahid	Bangladesh Awami League	

== See also ==
- Elections in Bangladesh
- 2018 elections in Bangladesh.
- 2024 elections in Bangladesh
