= 2008 Barishal City Corporation election =

Mayoral election in Bangladesh

Barishal City Corporation election
- 8 May 2008
- Registered: 180,545
- Turnout: 66.14%
	First party	Second party	Third party
Candidate	Shawkat Hossain Hiron	Sharfuddin Ahmed Santu	Ahsan Habib Kamal
Party	AL	PDP	BNP
Popular vote	46,795	46,208	26,416
Percentage	39.18%	38.69%	22.12%
Mayor before election
Awlad Hossain Dilu
BNP
Elected Mayor
Shawkat Hossain Hiron
AL

The 2008 Barishal City Corporation election was a local government election in the city of Barisal, Bangladesh, held on 8 May 2008 to elect the Mayor of Barishal. The election resulted in a victory for the Awami League candidate Shawkat Hossain Hiron, who defeated Sharfuddin Ahmed Santu of the Progressive Democratic Party (Bangladesh) and Ahsan Habib Kamal of the Bangladesh Nationalist Party. Shawkat Hossain Hiron became the mayor of the Barishal City Corporation following the election.

== Results ==
Barisal Mayoral Election 2008
Party	Candidate	Votes	%	±%
AL	Shawkat Hossain Hiron	46,795	39.18	New
PDP	Sharfuddin Ahmed Santu	46,208	38.69	New
BNP	Ahsan Habib Kamal	26,416	22.12	New
Majority		587	0.49	New
Turnout		119,419	66.14	New
Registered electors		180,545		
AL gain from BNP				
