= 2013 Barishal City Corporation election =

Mayoral election in Bangladesh

- 15 June 2013
- Registered: 211,257 (▲17.01 pp)
- Turnout: 70.76% (▲4.62 pp)
	First party	Second party
Candidate	Ahsan Habib Kamal	Shawkat Hossain Hiron
Party	BNP	AL
Popular vote	82,751	66,741
Percentage	55.35%	44.65%
Swing	▲33.23pp	▲5.47pp
Mayor before election
Shawkat Hossain Hiron
AL
Elected Mayor
Ahsan Habib Kamal
BNP
- Council election
- 15 June 2013; 40 seats in the Barisal City Corporation
Party	Leader	Seats	+/–
BNP	Ahsan Habib Kamal	28	+28
AL	Shawkat Hossain Hiron	7	+7
Independent	—	5	+5
This lists parties that won seats. See the complete results below.

The 2013 Barishal City Corporation election was a local government election in the city of Barisal, Bangladesh, held on 15 June 2013 to elect the Mayor of Barishal and the Barishal City Council. The election resulted in a victory for the Bangladesh Nationalist Party candidate Ahsan Habib Kamal, who defeated the incumbent Awami League candidate Shawkat Hossain Hiron. In the 40-member City Council, the Bangladesh Nationalist Party won 28 seats, while the Awami League won 7 seats and independents won 5 seats. Ahsan Habib Kamal became the mayor of the Barishal City Corporation following the election.

== Results ==
Barisal Mayoral Election 2013
Party	Candidate	Votes	%	±%
BNP	Ahsan Habib Kamal	82,751	55.35	+33.23
AL	Shawkat Hossain Hiron	66,741	44.65	+5.47
Majority		16,010	10.70	New
Turnout		1,49,492	70.76	+4.62
Registered electors		2,11,257		
BNP gain from AL				
