= Barisal-5 =

Constituency of Bangladesh's Jatiya Sangsad

Coordinates: 22.70°N 90.37°E

- Constituency for the Jatiya Sangsad
- District: Barisal District
- Division: Barisal Division
- Electorate: 397,514 (2018)

Current constituency
- Created: 1973
- Parliamentary Party: Bangladesh Nationalist Party
- Member of Parliament: Mazibur Rahman Sarwar
- ← 122 Barisal-4 124 Barisal-6 →

Barisal-5 is a constituency represented in the Jatiya Sangsad (National Parliament) of Bangladesh. Mazibur Rahman Sarwar is the incumbent member of Parliament from this constituency.

== Boundaries ==
The constituency encompasses Barisal City Corporation and Barisal Sadar Upazila.

== History ==
The constituency was created for the first general elections in newly independent Bangladesh, held in 1973.

== Members of Parliament ==
Election	Member	Party
1973	Abdul Mannan Howlader	Bangladesh Awami League
1979	Sunil Kumar Gupta	Bangladesh Nationalist Party
1986	M. Matiur Rahman	Jatiya Party (Ershad)
1991	Abdur Rahman Biswas	Bangladesh Nationalist Party
Dec 1991 by-election	Mazibur Rahman Sarwar	Bangladesh Nationalist Party
1996	Nasim Biswas	Bangladesh Nationalist Party
1998 by-election	Mazibur Rahman Sarwar	Bangladesh Nationalist Party
2014	Shawkat Hossain Hiron	Bangladesh Awami League
2014 by-election	Jebunnesa Afroz	Bangladesh Awami League
2018	Zahid Faruk	Bangladesh Awami League
2026	Mazibur Rahman Sarwar	Bangladesh Nationalist Party

== Elections ==
=== Elections in the 2020s ===
General election 2026: Barisal-5
Party	Candidate	Votes	%	±%
BNP	Mazibur Rahman Sarwar	135,146	53.19	+8.19
IAB	Syed Faizul Karim	95,044	37.41	+25.81
BSD	Manisha Chakraborty	22,486	8.85	N/A
JP(E)	Akhtar Rahman	909	0.36	−0.54
NPP	Abdul Hannan Sikder	494	0.19	N/A
Majority		40,102	15.78	+13.08
Turnout		254,079	50.68	−29.22
Registered electors		501,304		
BNP gain from AL				

=== Elections in the 2010s ===
Shawkat Hossain Hiron died in April 2014. Jebunnesa Afroz, his widow, was elected in a June 2014 by-election.

Barisal-5 by-election, June 2014
Party	Candidate	Votes	%	±%
AL	Jebunnesa Afroz	183,629	96.1	+49.3
BNF	Saiful Islam Liton	6,136	3.2	N/A
Majority		177,493	92.9	+90.2
Turnout		191,028	55.8	−24.1
AL hold				

Shawkat Hossain Hiron, of the Awami League, was elected unopposed in the 2014 general election after opposition parties withdrew their candidacies in a boycott of the election.

=== Elections in the 2000s ===
General Election 2008: Barisal-5
Party	Candidate	Votes	%	±%
BNP	Mazibur Rahman Sarwar	105,694	45.0	−14.7
AL	Zahid Faruk	99,393	42.3	+13.5
IAB	Sayed Md. Faizul Karim	27,156	11.6	N/A
Zaker Party	Mizanur Rahman Bachchu	2,023	0.9	N/A
NPP	A.B.M. Masud Karim	251	0.1	N/A
Independent	Mahbub Uddin Ahmed	225	0.1	N/A
Majority		6,301	2.7	−28.1
Turnout		234,742	79.9	+16.1
BNP hold				

General Election 2001: Barisal-5
Party	Candidate	Votes	%	±%
BNP	Mazibur Rahman Sarwar	108,412	59.7	
AL	Shawkat Hossain Hiron	52,385	28.8	
IJOF	Sayed Md. Faizul Karim	20,553	11.3	
JSD	S. M. Saifur Rahman	244	0.1	
Jatiya Party (M)	Md. Shafiqul Islam Shah Alam	143	0.1	
Majority		56,027	30.8	
Turnout		181,737	63.8	
BNP hold				

=== Elections in the 1990s ===
Nasim Biswas died in March 1998. Majibur Rahman Sarwar, of the BNP, was elected in a mid-1998 by-election.

General Election June 1996: Barisal-5
Party	Candidate	Votes	%	±%
BNP	Nasim Biswas	70,804	45.8	
AL	Mahabub Uddin Ahmed	42,922	27.7	
JP(E)	Shawkat Hossain Hiron	31,111	20.1	
Jamaat	Muazzaman Hossain Helel	4,667	3.0	
IOJ	Syed Nashir Ahmed Kowsher	4,647	3.0	
Jatiya Samajtantrik Dal-JSD	Mostafizur Rahman	330	0.2	
FP	A. Hannan Chowdhury	131	0.1	
Independent	Md. Hannan Sherniabad	69	0.0	
Independent	Md. A. Malek Mridha	68	0.0	
Majority		27,882	18.0	
Turnout		154,749	73.7	
BNP hold				

In October 1991, Abdur Rahman Biswas became President of Bangladesh, vacating his parliamentary seat. M. R. Sarwar was elected in a December 1991 by-election.

General Election 1991: Barisal-5
Party	Candidate	Votes	%	±%
BNP	Abdur Rahman Biswas	52,095	43.7	
AL	Mahabub Uddin Ahmed	28,705	24.1	
JP(E)	M. Matiur Rahman	22,864	19.2	
Jamaat	Abul Hasnat Md. Nurullah	5,704	4.8	
IOJ	Rashid Ahmod Ferdous	4,177	3.5	
WPB	Rashed Khan Menon	1,712	1.4	
Zaker Party	Alauddin Miah	1,544	1.3	
Bangladesh Janata Party	Md. Obaidul Islam	1,383	1.2	
Independent	Md. Enaet Pir Khan	336	0.3	
Independent	Tofael Ahmed	165	0.1	
National Democratic Party	Shamsul Alam	138	0.1	
Jatiya Samajtantrik Dal-JSD	Sikder Md. Nizam	131	0.1	
FP	Kazi Abdul Naim	118	0.1	
Jatiya Jukta Front	F. A. Faisal	87	0.1	
Independent	Khandakar M. A. Kasem	35	0.0	
Majority		23,390	19.6	
Turnout		119,194	47.9	
BNP gain from JP(E)				
