= Talukder Mohammad Yunus =

Bangladeshi politician

Talukder Mohammad Younus
- তালুকদার মোহাম্মদ ইউনুস

Member of Parliament
- In office 29 January 2014 – 29 January 2019
- Preceded by: Manirul Islam
- Succeeded by: Shah-e-Alam
- Constituency: Barisal-2
- In office 29 January 2009 – 29 January 2014
- Preceded by: Zahir Uddin Swapan
- Succeeded by: Abul Hasanat Abdullah
- Constituency: Barisal-1

Personal details
- Born: 4 May 1952 (age 73) Barishal
- Party: Bangladesh Awami League

Talukder Mohammad Younus (তালুকদার মোঃ ইউনুস; born 4 May 1952) is a Bangladesh Awami League politician and the a former Member of Jatiya Sangsad from Barisal-1 and Barisal-2.

== Early life ==
Yunus was born on 4 May 1952. He completed his undergraduate with a B.A. and a law degree.

== Career ==
Yunus was elected to Parliament on 5 January 2014 from Barisal-2 as a Bangladesh Awami League candidate. He was jailed after the 2024 July Revolution, but got bail in early 2026.
