= Abdul Mannan Howlader =

Bangladeshi politician

Member of Bangladesh Parliament
- In office 1973–1979
- Succeeded by: Sunil Kumar Gupta

Personal details
- Died: 6 October 2015 Sher-e-Bangla Medical College, Barisal, Bangladesh
- Party: Bangladesh Awami League

Abdul Mannan Howlader (died 6 October 2015) was a Bangladesh Awami League politician and a former member of parliament for Barisal-5.

== Career ==
Howlader was elected to parliament from Barisal-5 as a Bangladesh Awami League candidate in 1973.

== Death ==
Howlader died on 6 October 2015, in Sher-e-Bangla Medical College, Barisal, Bangladesh.
