= Parishad =

Parishad may refer to:

- A council, such as of a city or district in South Asia
- A legislative council, such as of a state in India

== See also ==
- Administrative geography of Bangladesh
- Local government in India
- State governments of India
