= Golam Faruque Ovi =

Bangladeshi politician

Member of Parliament (MP) of Bangladesh Jatiya Sangsad.
- In office 1996–2001
- Preceded by: Rashed Khan Menon
- Succeeded by: Syed Moazzem Hossain Alal

Personal details
- Party: Independent
- Other political affiliations: Jatiya Party

Golam Faruque Ovi is an independent politician and former Member of Parliament (MP) of Bangladesh Jatiya Sangsad.

== Career ==
Ovi was elected to parliament from Barisal-2 constituency as a Jatiya Party (Ershad) candidate in 1996. Being the youngest MP of the 7th parliament, he attracted national attention by being vocal about contemporary issues as well as advocating for gender equality, the rights of religious minorities and indigenous peoples. His ability to secure funding from both national and international organizations for the development of the transportation network, riverbank protection, and various infrastructure projects in his constituency was highly praised. Through his efforts, the Barisal Government Veterinary College, the first such college in southern Bangladesh at the time, was established in Babuganj with the funding of the Asian Development Bank. Later the college was incorporated as a satellite campus of Patuakhali Science and Technology University (PSTU).

Ovi was against the decision made by the Jatiya Party to join the Bangladesh Nationalist Party (BNP) headed right-wing alliance which led to his expulsion from the party in 1999. In December 2002, a year after his defeat in the 8th Parliamentary Elections, he left Bangladesh out of fear of political persecution and later sought asylum in Canada. He made known his intention to return to Bangladesh in an interview with the Daily Jugantor in October 2025.

== _{Controversy} ==
Golam Faruque Ovi was implicated in the unusual death of model Tinni which many saw as a deliberate plot to end his political career. He was acquitted in absentia in the case by judge Shahinur Akter in January 2025. Based on the evidence presented before the court, the judge in her legal observation stated that the unusual death of the model was in fact a suicide and the charge brought against Ovi was unfounded and politically motivated.
