= Rajihar =

Rajihar রাজিহার
- Village
- Location in Bangladesh
- Coordinates: 22.998464°N 90.157593°E
- Country: Bangladesh
- Division: Barisal Division
- District: Barisal District
- Upazila: Agailjhara Upazila

Area
  - Total: 4.93 km^{2} (1.90 sq mi)

Population (2022)
  - Total: 3,314
  - Density: 672/km^{2} (1,740/sq mi)
- Time zone: UTC+6 (Bangladesh Time)

Rajihar is a village in Agailjhara Upazila of Barisal District in the Barisal Division of southern-central Bangladesh.

According to the 2022 Census of Bangladesh, Rajihar had 800 households and a population of 3,314. It has a total area of 4.93 km^{2} (1.90 sq mi).
