= Mollapara =

Mollapara মোল্লাপাড়া
- Village
- Location in Bangladesh
- Coordinates: 22°56′0″N 90°10′0″E
- Country: Bangladesh
- Division: Barisal Division
- District: Barisal District
- Upazila: Agailjhara Upazila

Area
  - Total: 5.86 km^{2} (2.26 sq mi)

Population (2022)
  - Total: 5,047
  - Density: 861/km^{2} (2,230/sq mi)
- Time zone: UTC+6 (Bangladesh Time)

Mollapara is a village in Agailjhara Upazila of Barisal District in the Barisal Division of southern-central Bangladesh.

According to the 2022 Census of Bangladesh, Mollapara had 1,198 households and a population of 5,047. It has a total area of 5.86 km^{2} (2.26 sq mi).
