= Zaheed Farooque =

Bangladeshi politician

- জাহিদ ফারুক
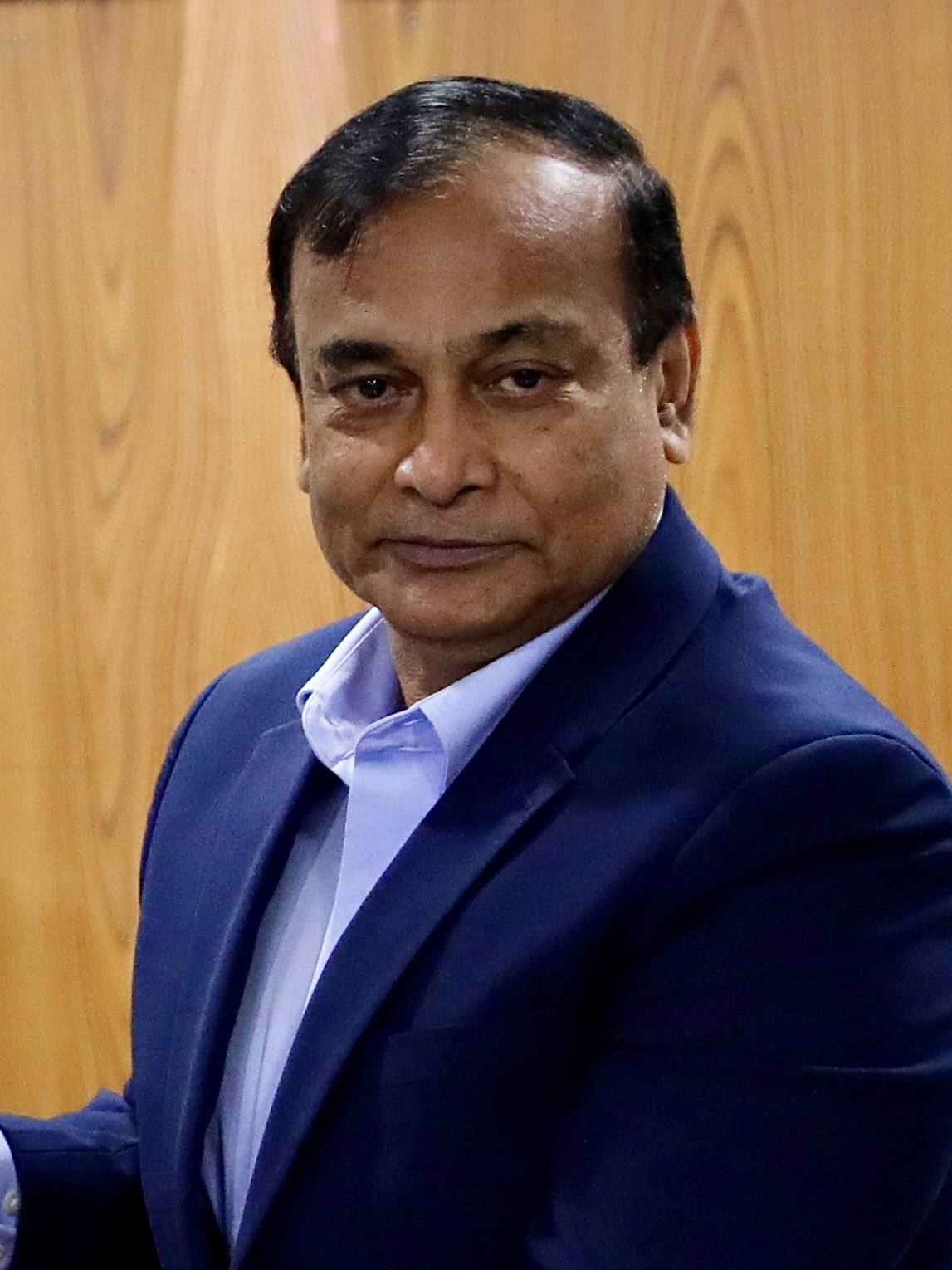
- Farooque in Dhaka (2021)

Minister of State for Water Resources
- In office 7 January 2019 – 6 August 2024
- Prime Minister: Sheikh Hasina
- Preceded by: Muhammad Nazrul Islam
- Succeeded by: Syeda Rizwana Hasan

Member of Parliament for Barisal-5
- In office 5 January 2019 – 6 August 2024
- Preceded by: Jebunnesa Afroz
- Succeeded by: Mazibur Rahman Sarwar

Personal details
- Born: 26 November 1950 (age 75) Bakerganj, East Bengal, Pakistan
- Party: Bangladesh Awami League
- Education: University of Peshawar

Military service
- Allegiance: Bangladesh
- Branch/service: Bangladesh Army
- Years of service: 1977 - 2008
- Rank: Colonel
- Unit: Corps of Electrical Mechanical Engineers
- Commands: Commandant of 902nd Central EME Workshop; Commandant of EME Centre and School

Zaheed Farooque (born 26 November 1950) is a Bangladesh Awami League politician. He is a former State Minister of Water Resources and a former Jatiya Sangsad member representing the Barisal-5 constituency during 2019–2024.

== Career ==
Farooque retired from Bangladesh as a colonel.

Farooque was elected to parliament on 30 December 2018 from Barisal-5 as a Bangladesh Awami League candidate. He was appointed the State Minister of Water Resources in the Fourth Sheikh Hasina Cabinet.

On 23 August 2024, charges were filed against him and at least 377 others for their role in an attack on the offices of the Bangladesh Nationalist Party in Barisal during the Non-cooperation movement (2024) on 5 August.
