= Paysa =

Paysa পয়সা
- Village
- Location in Bangladesh
- Coordinates: 22°58′N 90°05′E
- Country: Bangladesh
- Division: Barisal Division
- District: Barisal District
- Upazila: Agailjhara Upazila

Area
  - Total: 4.48 km^{2} (1.73 sq mi)

Population (2022)
  - Total: 4,608
  - Density: 1,030/km^{2} (2,660/sq mi)
- Time zone: UTC+6 (Bangladesh Time)

Paysa is a village in Agailjhara Upazila of Barisal District in the Barisal Division of southern-central Bangladesh.

According to the 2022 Census of Bangladesh, Paysa had 1,104 households and a population of 4,608. It has a total area of 4.48 km^{2} (1.73 sq mi).
