= Afroz =

Afroz is a surname. Notable people with the surname include:

- Jebunnesa Afroz, Bangladeshi politician
- Zoya Afroz (born 1994), Indian actress, model, and beauty pageant titleholder
