= 2018 Barishal City Corporation election =

Mayoral election in Bangladesh

- 30 July 2018
- Registered: 241,959 (▲14.53 pp)
- Turnout: 57.55% (▼13.21 pp)
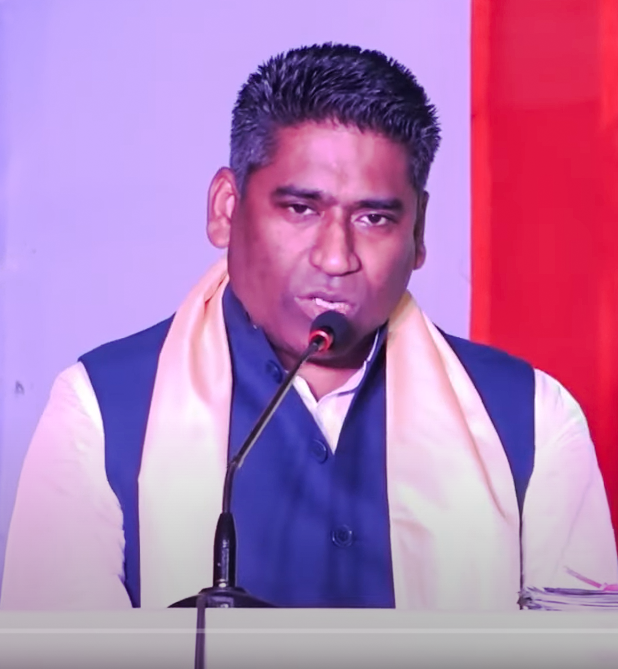
	First party	Second party
Candidate	Serniabat Sadiq Abdullah	Mujibur Rahman Sarwar
Party	AL	BNP
Popular vote	109,803	13,041
Percentage	78.91%	9.37%
Swing	▲34.26pp	▼45.98pp
Mayor before election
Ahsan Habib Kamal
BNP
Elected Mayor
Serniabat Sadiq Abdullah
AL
- Council election
- 30 July 2018; 40 seats in the Barisal City Corporation
Party	Leader	Seats	+/–
AL	Sadiq Abdullah	27	−1
BNP	Mujibur Rahman	4	−3
JP(E)	—	1	+1
Independent	—	8	+3
This lists parties that won seats. See the complete results below.

The 2018 Barishal City Corporation election was a local government election in the city of Barisal, Bangladesh, held on 30 July 2018 to elect the Mayor of Barishal and the Barishal City Council. The election resulted in a victory for the Awami League candidate Serniabat Sadiq Abdullah. In the 40-member City Council, the Awami League won 27 seats, while the Bangladesh Nationalist Party won 4 seats, independents won 8 seats, and the Jatiya Party (Ershad) won 1 seat. Serniabat Sadiq Abdullah became the second mayor of the Barishal City Corporation following the election.

== Candidates ==
=== Mayoral election ===
Name	Party	Ref.
Serniabat Sadiq Abdullah	Bangladesh Awami League	
Mujibur Rahman Sarwar	Bangladesh Nationalist Party	
Obaidur Rahman Mahbub	Islami Andolon Bangladesh	
Md Iqbal Hossain	Jatiya Party (Ershad)	
Abul Kalam Azad	Communist Party of Bangladesh	
Manisha Chakrabarty	Socialist Party of Bangladesh	

== Incidents ==
Before the elections, hundreds of Bangladesh Nationalist Party activists were detained.

BNP candidate Sarwar withdrew before the voting was completed alleging irregularities with the voting.

A mayoral candidate, Manisha Chakraborty of BSD, was assaulted as she protested snatching of ballot papers by AL supporters at a polling station in ward-17 in Barisal.

== Result ==
=== Mayoral election result ===
Abdullah received 107,353 votes while his nearest rival, Mazibor Rahman Sarwar of Bangladesh Nationalist Party, received 13,135 votes.

Barisal Mayoral Election 2018
Party	Candidate	Votes	%	±%
AL	Serniabat Sadiq Abdullah	109,803	78.92	+34.28
BNP	Mujibur Rahman Sarwar	13,041	9.37	−45.99
Majority		96,762	69.55	+58.83
Turnout		139,151	57.55	−13.23
Registered electors		241,959		
AL gain from BNP				

=== Council election ===
==== Party-wise ====
2018 BCC council election results (party-wise)
Party	Seats		
Party	Ward Councilors	Reserved Women Councilors	Total Councilors
Bangladesh Awami League	20	7	27
Bangladesh Nationalist Party	3	1	4
Jatiya Party (Ershad)	1	—	1
Independent	6	2	8
Total	30	10	40

== Aftermath ==
The election was boycotted by the candidates of Communist Party of Bangladesh and Islami Andolon Bangladesh who alleged vote rigging.

They demanded the Election Commission postpone the polls.

New elected mayor Abdullah was sworn in office by Prime Minister Sheikh Hasina at the Prime Minister's Office in Dhaka.
