= Barisal-2 =

Constituency of Bangladesh's Jatiya Sangsad

Coordinates: 22.82°N 90.25°E

- Constituency for the Jatiya Sangsad
- District: Barisal District
- Division: Barisal Division
- Electorate: 385,807 (2026)

Current constituency
- Created: 1973
- Parliamentary Party: Bangladesh Nationalist Party
- Member of Parliament: Sardar Sarfuddin Ahmed
- ← 119 Barisal-1 121 Barisal-3 →

Barisal-2 is a constituency represented in the Jatiya Sangsad (National Parliament) of Bangladesh. Sardar Sarfuddin Ahmed is currently the member of parliament for Barisal-2.

== Boundaries ==
The constituency encompasses Banaripara and Wazirpur upazilas.

== History ==
The constituency was created for the first general elections in newly independent Bangladesh, held in 1973.

Ahead of the 2008 general election, the Election Commission redrew constituency boundaries to reflect population changes revealed by the 2001 Bangladesh census. The 2008 redistricting altered the boundaries of the constituency.

== Members of Parliament ==
Election	Member	Party
1973	Nazrul Islam	Bangladesh Awami League
1979	Abdul Wadud Sardar	Bangladesh Nationalist Party
1986	Syed Azizul Haque	Jatiya Party (Ershad)
1991	Rashed Khan Menon	Workers Party of Bangladesh
Feb 1996	Syed Moazzem Hossain Alal	Bangladesh Nationalist Party
Jun 1996	Golam Faruque Ovi	Jatiya Party (Ershad)
2001	Syed Moazzem Hossain Alal	Bangladesh Nationalist Party
2008	Manirul Islam	Bangladesh Awami League
2014	Talukder Yunus	Bangladesh Awami League
2018	Shah-e-Alam	Bangladesh Awami League
2024	Rashed Khan Menon	Workers Party of Bangladesh
2026	Sardar Sarfuddin Ahmed	Bangladesh Nationalist Party

== Elections ==
=== Elections in the 2020s ===
General election 2026: Barisal-2
Party	Candidate	Votes	%	±%
BNP	Sardar Sarfuddin Ahmed	141,622	62.38	+17.28
Jamaat	Abdul Mannan	74,082	32.63	+28.23
Majority		67,540	29.75	+23.55
Turnout		227,024	58.84	+3.24
Registered electors		385,807		
BNP gain from WPB				

=== Elections in the 2010s ===
General Election 2014: Barisal-2
Party	Candidate	Votes	%	±%
AL	Talukder Yunus	134,878	93.8	+42.5
JP(E)	Md. Nasiruddin Nasim Hawlader	5,088	3.5	N/A
Independent	Sabina Aktar	3,879	2.7	N/A
Majority		129,790	90.2	+84.0
Turnout		143,845	55.6	−30.8
AL hold				

=== Elections in the 2000s ===
General Election 2008: Barisal-2
Party	Candidate	Votes	%	±%
AL	Manirul Islam	100,002	51.3	+22.9
BNP	Sardar Sarfuddin Ahmed	87,976	45.1	+7.1
Independent	Sayed Shahidul Hoque Jamal	3,362	1.7	N/A
Zaker Party	Nur Mohammad Howlader	1,988	1.0	N/A
BDB	Sayma Jalil	620	0.3	N/A
Independent	Ranzit Kumar Baray	516	0.3	N/A
Independent	Albart Baray	378	0.2	N/A
Bangladesh Kalyan Party	Abdul Haque	127	0.1	N/A
Majority		12,026	6.2	−3.4
Turnout		194,969	86.4	−21.6
AL gain from BNP				

General Election 2001: Barisal-2
Party	Candidate	Votes	%	±%
BNP	Syed Moazzem Hossain Alal	60,164	38.0	+11.5
AL	Abul Hasanat Abdullah	44,919	28.4	+7.2
Jatiya Party (M)	Golam Faruque Ovi	30,511	19.3	N/A
IJOF	Golam Kibria Tipu	14,491	9.1	N/A
WPB	Rashed Khan Menon	8,353	5.3	−6.5
Majority		15,245	9.6	+8.2
Turnout		158,438	64.8	−4.6
BNP gain from JP(E)				

=== Elections in the 1990s ===
General Election June 1996: Barisal-2
Party	Candidate	Votes	%	±%
JP(E)	Golam Faruque Ovi	33,556	28.0	+9.9
BNP	Syed Moazzem Hossain Alal	31,844	26.5	+14.3
AL	Syed Moinul Haque	25,403	21.2	−4.0
WPB	Rashed Khan Menon	14,124	11.8	−21.2
Jamaat	Bazlur Rashid	5,268	4.4	−5.2
Independent	Sarder Sarfuddin Ahamed	3,359	2.8	N/A
IOJ	Abdul Malek Sarder	2,418	2.0	N/A
Independent	Shah Kashruzzaman	2,135	1.8	N/A
Independent	Golam Kibria Tipu	1,733	1.4	N/A
Independent	Abdul Alim Khan	195	0.2	N/A
Majority		1,712	1.4	−6.4
Turnout		120,035	69.4	+23.6
JP(E) gain from WPB				

General Election 1991: Barisal-2
Party	Candidate	Votes	%	±%
WPB	Rashed Khan Menon	36,311	33.0	
AL	Haranath Bain	27,697	25.2	
JP(E)	Golam Kibria	19,876	18.1	
BNP	M. A. Rahman Mallik	13,465	12.2	
Jamaat	Bazlur Rashid	10,577	9.6	
Independent	Khairul Alam Hang.	1,499	1.4	
NDP	Md. Delwar Hossain	408	0.4	
Jatiya Samajtantrik Dal-JSD	Mujibur Rahman Kabiraz	148	0.1	
Majority		8,614	7.8	
Turnout		109,981	45.8	
WPB gain from JP(E)				
