= List of mayors of Barisal =

Mayor of Barisal
- Incumbent; Vacant since 19 August 2024
- Barishal City Corporation
- Style: Honourable (formal)
- Type: Council Leader
- Member of: Barishal City Corporation
- Seat: Nagar Bhaban, Barisal
- Appointer: Electorate of Barisal
- Term length: Five years, renewable
- Constituting instrument: The City Corporation act, 2009
- Inaugural holder: Ahsan Habib Kamal
- Formation: 25 July 2002; 24 years ago
- Salary: ৳150000 (US$1,200) per month (incl. allowances)
- Website: barishalcity.gov.bd

The Mayor of Barisal City is the highest ranking official of the Barishal City Corporation. The Mayor's office administers all city services, public property, most public agencies, and enforces all city and state laws within Barisal city.

The Mayor's office is located in Nagar Bhaban; it has jurisdiction over all 30 wards of Barisal City

== List of officeholders ==
Political parties

- Bangladesh Awami League
- Bangladesh Nationalist Party

Status

Acting Mayor and Administrator

No.	Portrait	Officeholder (birth–death)	Election	Term of office			Designation	Political party	Reference
No.	Portrait	Officeholder (birth–death)	Election	From	To	Period	Designation	Political party	Reference
1		Ahsan Habib Kamal (1954–2022)	–	25 July 2002	14 July 2003	354 days	Mayor	Bangladesh Nationalist Party	
2		Mazibur Rahman Sarwar	2003	24 April 2003	21 April 2007	3 years, 362 days	Mayor	Bangladesh Nationalist Party	
–		Awlad Hossain Dilu	–	22 July 2007	11 September 2008	1 year, 51 days	Acting Mayor	Bangladesh Nationalist Party	
3		Shawkat Hossain Hiron (1956–2014)	2008	11 September 2008	15 June 2013	4 years, 277 days	Mayor	Bangladesh Awami League	
4		Ahsan Habib Kamal (1954–2022)	2013	15 June 2013	8 October 2018	5 years, 115 days	Mayor	Bangladesh Nationalist Party	
5		Serniabat Sadiq Abdullah	2018	31 October 2018	9 November 2023	7 years, 311 days	Mayor	Bangladesh Awami League	
6		Abul Khair Abdullah	2023	14 November 2023	19 August 2024	279 days	Mayor	Bangladesh Awami League	
–		Md. Shaukat Ali	–	19 August 2024	Incumbent	2 years, 19 days	Administrator	Independent	

== Elections ==
=== Election Result 2023 ===
Barisal Mayoral Election 2023
Party	Candidate	Votes	%	±%
AL	Abul Khair Abdullah	87,752	62.99	−15.93
IAB	Syed Faizul Karim	34,345	24.65	+14.33
Independent	Kamrul Ahsan	7,999	5.74	New
JP(E)	Iqbal Hossain Taposh	6,665	4.78	New
Zaker Party	Mizanur Rahman Bachchu	2,546	1.83	New
Majority		53,407	38.34	−31.21
Turnout		142,177	51.46	−6.09
Registered electors		276,298		
AL hold				

=== Election result 2018 ===
Barisal Mayoral Election 2018
Party	Candidate	Votes	%	±%
AL	Serniabat Sadiq Abdullah	109,803	78.92	+34.28
BNP	Mujibur Rahman Sarwar	13,041	9.37	−45.99
Majority		96,762	69.55	+58.83
Turnout		139,151	57.55	−13.23
Registered electors		241,959		
AL gain from BNP				

=== Election result 2013 ===
Barisal Mayoral Election 2013
Party	Candidate	Votes	%	±%
BNP	Ahsan Habib Kamal	82,751	55.35	+33.23
AL	Shawkat Hossain Hiron	66,741	44.65	+5.47
Majority		16,010	10.70	New
Turnout		149,492	70.76	+4.62
Registered electors		211,257		
BNP gain from AL				

=== Election result 2008 ===
Barisal Mayoral Election 2008
Party	Candidate	Votes	%	±%
AL	Shawkat Hossain Hiron	46,795	39.18	New
PDP	Sharfuddin Ahmed Santu	46,208	38.69	New
BNP	Ahsan Habib Kamal	26,416	22.12	New
Majority		587	0.49	New
Turnout		119,419	66.14	New
Registered electors		180,545		
AL gain from BNP				
