= Zahir Uddin Swapon =

Bangladeshi politician

- জহির উদ্দিন স্বপন
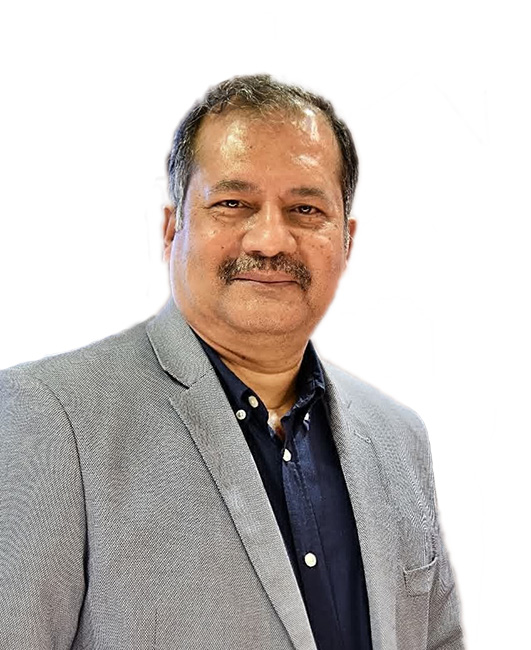
- Swapan in 2026

Member of Parliament
- Incumbent
- Assumed office 17 February 2026
- Preceded by: Abul Hasanat Abdullah
- Constituency: Barisal-1
- In office 28 October 2001 – 27 October 2006
- Succeeded by: Talukder Md. Younus
- Constituency: Barisal-1
- In office 19 March 1996 – 30 March 1996
- Preceded by: Abul Hasnat Abdullah
- Constituency: Barisal-1

Minister for Information and Broadcasting
- In office 17 February 2026 – 21 August 2026
- President: Mohammed Shahabuddin; Hafiz Uddin Ahmad (acting)
- Prime Minister: Tarique Rahman
- Preceded by: Rizwana Hasan
- Succeeded by: Andaleeve Rahman

Personal details
- Born: 29 June 1960 (age 66) Barishal, East Pakistan, Pakistan
- Party: Bangladesh Nationalist Party

Zahir Uddin Swapon (born 29 June 1960) is a Bangladeshi politician. He is an adviser to the prime minister of Bangladesh, Tarique Rahman with the rank of minister. He was the Minister of Information and Broadcasting in the nineteenth cabinet of Bangladesh. He is also serving as the member of parliament for Barishal‑1 (Gournadi–Agailjhara) in the 13th Jatiya Sangsad.

As a member of the Bangladesh Nationalist Party (BNP), he represented Barishal‑1 earlier in the 6th and 8th parliaments (1996 and 2001) and served as a senior media and research official in the party where he was the founding convenor of BNP Media Cell.

== Early life and education ==
Swapon was born in Sarikal village of Gournadi Upazila in Barishal District. He was a student of Government Brajalal College in Khulna and later obtained a master’s degree in political science from the University of Dhaka.

== Student activism ==
Swapon became involved in left‑leaning student politics. He rose through the ranks of Bangladesh Chhatra Maitri, a progressive student organisation, and eventually became its central president. During the late 1980s and 1990, he played a prominent role in the 90's Anti-Authoritarian Movement that toppled the government of General Hussain Muhammad Ershad in Bangladesh.

== BNP career and organisational roles ==
=== Joining the Bangladesh Nationalist Party ===
Swapon joined the Bangladesh Nationalist Party (BNP) in 1993 and quickly became known for his media and communication skills. He helped establish the party’s Media Cell and served as its founding convener. Over time he became a close adviser to BNP chairperson Khaleda Zia and was appointed to her advisory council.

=== Media and research work ===
In his organisational capacity, Swapon led the BNP Communication Cell as the chief editor and served as director of the party‑affiliated Bangladesh Nationalist Research and Communication (BNRC) centre. As one of the party’s principal spokesmen during opposition campaigns, he frequently interacted with the media and drafted communication strategies. In 2024 he joined the party’s advisory council. As an adviser he was involved in campaign planning for the 2026 general election.

== Parliamentary career ==
=== 6th and 8th Parliaments (1996–2006) ===
Swapon first entered the Jatiya Sangsad (parliament) in the sixth national parliamentary election held on 15 February 1996, winning the Barishal‑1 (Gournadi–Agailjhara) seat as a BNP candidate.The sixth parliament was short‑lived; after its dissolution he again contested the seat in the 8th national parliamentary election in October 2001 and was re‑elected.

=== International representation ===
Swapon has represented Bangladesh at the United Nations General Assembly twice as a member of parliament, addressing issues such as financing for development. Additionally, he served as Vice‑President (Asia Region) of Parliamentarians for Global Action (PGA), a non‑partisan network of legislators working on human rights and rule of law issues.

== 2026 election victory and cabinet appointment ==
=== Election campaign and result ===
Ahead of the 13th national parliamentary election held on 12 February 2026, the BNP nominated Swapon for the Barishal‑1 constituency. According to official results announced by the returning officer, he secured the seat with a landslide victory by gaining 100,552 votes, defeating Jamaat‑e‑Islami candidate Md Kamrul Islam Khan (who secured 46,263 votes) by a margin of 54,289 votes.

=== Minister of Information and Broadcasting ===
Following the BNP‑led coalition’s landslide victory, Swapon was one of several senior BNP leaders appointed to the cabinet. He took the oath of office as Minister of Information and Broadcasting on 17 February 2026, under Prime Minister Tarique Rahman. His appointment generated enthusiasm in his constituency and within the BNP.

== Political positions and views ==
As a long‑time party strategist, Swapon has emphasised media freedom, transparency and participatory politics. In his statements at the United Nations and in domestic forums he has called for more concessional financing for least‑developed countries and stronger protections for human rights. He has also argued that the information ministry should prioritise the independence of public broadcasters and support digital innovation in the media sector.
