= Sarfuddin Ahmed Santu =

Bangladesh Nationalist Party politician

Sardar Sarfuddin Ahmed Santu

Members of Parliament
- Incumbent
- Assumed office 17 February 2026
- Preceded by: Rashed Khan Menon
- Constituency: Barisal-2

Personal details
- Party: Bangladesh Nationalist Party
- Occupation: Politician

Sardar Sarfuddin Ahmed Santu is a Bangladeshi politician with the Bangladesh Nationalist Party. He was elected as the Member of Parliament for the Barisal-2 constituency in the 2026 Bangladeshi general election held on 12 February 2026.
