= Ratnapur Union =

Ratnapur রত্নপুর
- Union
- Location in Bangladesh
- Coordinates: 22°55′N 90°12′E
- Country: Bangladesh
- Division: Barisal Division
- District: Barisal District
- Upazila: Agailjhara Upazila

Area
  - Total: 1.87 km^{2} (0.72 sq mi)

Population (2022)
  - Total: 4,105
  - Density: 2,200/km^{2} (5,690/sq mi)
- Time zone: UTC+6 (Bangladesh Time)

Ratnapur is a union in Agailjhara Upazila of Barisal District in the Barisal Division of southern-central Bangladesh.

According to the 2022 Census of Bangladesh, Ratnapur had 999 households and a population of 4,105. It has a total area of 1.87 km^{2} (0.72 sq mi).
