= Barisal-1 =

Constituency of Bangladesh's Jatiya Sangsad

Coordinates: 22.97°N 90.23°E

- Constituency for the Jatiya Sangsad
- District: Barisal District
- Division: Barisal Division
- Electorate: 328,198 (2026)

Current constituency
- Created: 1973
- Parliamentary Party: Bangladesh Nationalist Party
- Member of Parliament: Zahir Uddin Swapon
- ← 118 Bhola-4 120 Barisal-2 →

Barisal-1 is a constituency represented in the Jatiya Sangsad (National Parliament) of Bangladesh. Zahir Uddin Swapan is the incumbent representative since February 2026.

== Boundaries ==
The constituency encompasses Agailjhara and Gournadi upazilas.

== History ==
The constituency was created for the first general elections in newly independent Bangladesh, held in 1973.

== Members of Parliament ==
Election	Member	Party
1973	Tofail Ahmed	Bangladesh Awami League
1979	Mosharraf Hossain Shahjahan	Bangladesh Nationalist Party
1986	Sunil Kumar Gupta	Jatiya Party (Ershad)
1991	Abul Hasnat Abdullah	Bangladesh Awami League
Feb 1996	Zahir Uddin Swapan	Bangladesh Nationalist Party
Jun 1996	Abul Hasnat Abdullah	Bangladesh Awami League
2001	Zahir Uddin Swapan	Bangladesh Nationalist Party
2008	Talukder Md. Younus	Bangladesh Awami League
2014	Abul Hasnat Abdullah	Bangladesh Awami League
2018	Abul Hasnat Abdullah	Bangladesh Awami League
2024	Abul Hasnat Abdullah	Bangladesh Awami League
2026	Zahir Uddin Swapan	Bangladesh Nationalist Party

== Elections ==
=== Elections in the 2020s ===
General election 2026: Barisal-1
Party	Candidate	Votes	%	±%
BNP	Zahir Uddin Swapan	100,552	50.12	+8.82
Jamaat	Md. Kamrul Islam Khan	46,263	23.06	+14.16
Majority		54,289	27.06	+11.16
Turnout		200,608	61.12	−25.88
Registered electors		328,198		
BNP gain from AL				

=== Elections in the 2010s ===
Abul Hasanat Abdullah was elected unopposed in the 2014 general election after opposition parties withdrew their candidacies in a boycott of the election.

=== Elections in the 2000s ===
General Election 2008: Barisal-1
Party	Candidate	Votes	%	±%
AL	Talukder Md. Younus	98,245	57.2	+12.1
BNP	Abdus Sobhan	70,969	41.3	−13.1
IAB	Golam Mahmud	1,582	0.9	N/A
Bangladesh Kalyan Party	Shuvashis Samaddar	415	0.2	N/A
Independent	Ashok Gupta	371	0.2	N/A
Independent	Zahir Uddin Shapan	203	0.1	N/A
Majority		27,276	15.9	+6.6
Turnout		171,785	87.0	+10.5
AL gain from BNP				

General Election 2001: Barisal-1
Party	Candidate	Votes	%	±%
BNP	Zahir Uddin Swapan	81,791	54.4	+11.2
AL	Abul Hasnat Abdullah	67,760	45.1	0.0
IJOF	Md. Haroon Ur Rashid	470	0.3	N/A
Independent	Bhabaranjan Baidhya	262	0.2	N/A
Independent	John Nihar Ranjan Biswas	64	0.0	N/A
Majority		14,031	9.3	+7.3
Turnout		150,347	76.5	−0.7
BNP gain from AL				

=== Elections in the 1990s ===
General Election June 1996: Barisal-1
Party	Candidate	Votes	%	±%
AL	Abul Hasnat Abdullah	52,418	45.1	−2.5
BNP	Kazi Golam Mahbub	50,125	43.2	+3.2
JP(E)	Sunil Kumar Gupta	6,054	5.2	+4.2
Jamaat	Sarder Abdus Salam	5,395	4.6	−4.3
IOJ	Abdur Razzak Khan	1,619	1.4	N/A
Independent	John Nihar Ranjan Biswas	374	0.3	N/A
Jatiya Janata Party (Asad)	Md. Mahabubur Rahman	111	0.1	N/A
Independent	Md. Abdul Latif Kabiraj	79	0.1	N/A
Majority		2,293	2.0	−5.6
Turnout		116,175	77.2	+16.6
AL hold				

General Election 1991: Barisal-1
Party	Candidate	Votes	%	±%
AL	Abul Hasanat Abdullah	55,697	47.6	
BNP	Kazi Golam Mahbub	46,855	40.0	
Jamaat	Sarder Abdus Salam	10,430	8.9	
Zaker Party	A. K. M. Forhad Hossain	1,510	1.3	
JP(E)	Sarwar Alam	1,154	1.0	
UCL	Zahir Uddin Swapan	613	0.5	
Independent	S. K. Zaman	597	0.5	
Bangladesh Muslim League (Kader)	Khalilur Rahman	165	0.1	
Majority		8,842	7.6	
Turnout		117,021	60.6	
AL gain from JP(E)				
