= Manirul Islam (Bangladeshi politician) =

Bangladeshi politician

Manirul Islam Monir

Member of Parliament for Barisal-2
- In office 29 December 2008 – 5 January 2014
- Preceded by: Syed Moazzem Hossain Alal
- Succeeded by: Talukder Yunus

Member of Parliament for Pirojpur-2
- In office 7 May 1986 – 3 March 1988
- Succeeded by: Anwar Hossain Manju

Member of Parliament for Pirojpur with Barisal
- In office 3 March 1988 – 6 December 1990
- Succeeded by: Syed Shahidul Huque Jamal

Personal details
- Born: Mohammad Monirul Islam Monir; 1 March 1952 (age 74) Barisal District
- Party: Bangladesh Awami League; Jatiya Party

Manirul Islam Monir (born 1 March 1952) is a Bangladesh Awami League politician and a former member of parliament for Barisal-2.

== Early life ==
Manirul was born on 1 March 1952. His father Rafiqul Islam was the president of Barisal District NAP and a professor of Bangla and philosophy in BM College. Mother Mahmuda Rafiq was a poet, writer and teacher. He and his brothers Zahidul Islam Mahmud Jami and Maidul Islam Chuni played a heroic role in the great liberation war in Sector 9. His sister Nargis Rafika Rahman was a journalist.

== Career ==
Monirul Islam Moni is a freedom fighter and leader of Bangladesh Awami League. He was the joint secretary general of the Jatiya Party and the founding president of the Jatiya Swechchhasebak Party.

He was elected as a member of parliament from the then Pirojpur-2 constituency as a candidate of Jatiya Party in the 3rd Jatiya Sangsad elections on 7 May 1986. He was elected as a member of parliament from Pirojpur constituency along with the then Barisal as a candidate of Jatiya Party in the 4th Jatiya Sangsad elections on 3 March 1988. At that time he was the chairman of Milk Vita.

He was elected to parliament from Barisal-2 as a Bangladesh Awami League candidate in 2008.
