= Kodaldhoa =

Kodaldhoa কোদালধোয়া
- Village
- Location in Bangladesh
- Coordinates: 22°59′N 90°8′E
- Country: Bangladesh
- Division: Barisal Division
- District: Barisal District
- Upazila: Agailjhara Upazila

Area
  - Total: 9.87 km^{2} (3.81 sq mi)

Population (2022)
  - Total: 6,122
  - Density: 620/km^{2} (1,610/sq mi)
- Time zone: UTC+6 (Bangladesh Time)

Kodaldhoa is a village in Agailjhara Upazila of Barisal District in the Barisal Division of southern-central Bangladesh.

According to the 2022 Census of Bangladesh, Kodaldhoa had 1,533 households and a population of 6,122. It has a total area of 9.87 km^{2} (3.81 sq mi).
