= Shah-e-Alam =

Bangladeshi politician

- মোঃ শাহে আলম

Member of 11th Jatiya Sangsad

Member of Parliament for
- In office 30 December 2018 – 7 January 2024
- Succeeded by: Rashed Khan Menon

Personal details
- Party: Bangladesh Awami League
- Occupation: Politician; Business

Shah-e-Alam (Bengali: শাহে আলম) is a Bangladesh Awami League politician and former Member of Parliament of Barisal-2.

== Career ==
Shah-e-Alam was elected to parliament from Barisal-2 as a Bangladesh Awami League candidate 30 December 2018. Alam is also member of the Parliamentary Standing committee for LGED.
