= Nasim Biswas =

Bangladeshi politician

Ehteshamul Haq Nasim Biswas

Member of Parliament

Personal details
- Died: 12 March 1998
- Party: Bangladesh Nationalist Party
- Education: Sher-e-Bangla Medical College

Ehteshamul Haq Nasim Biswas was a Bangladesh Nationalist Party politician and a member of parliament from Barisal-5.

== Biography ==
Biswas was the fourth son of Abdur Rahman Biswas, former president of Bangladesh, and Hosne Ara Rahman.

He studied medicine at Sher-e-Bangla Medical College and graduated in 1984. He was a doctor and professor before being elected to parliament in 1996 from Barisal-5 as a candidate of the Bangladesh Nationalist Party. One of his campaign pledges was the construction of Taltali Bridge, construction of which started in 1996 undertaken by Moitry International. Biswas died in 1998, and his successors did not see to the continuation of the project. As of 2008, the project remains incomplete.

== Death ==
Biswas died on 12 March 1998 after suffering health complications from food poisoning. He is succeeded by his wife and daughter.
