= Barishal City Corporation =

Local governing body of Barishal, Bangladesh

Coordinates: 22.7018°N 90.3734°E

Barishal City Corporation বরিশাল সিটি কর্পোরেশন
- Emblem of the Barishal City Corporation

Type
- Type: City Corporation

History
- Founded: July 25, 2002; 23 years ago
- New session started: 16 March 2026

Leadership
- Mayor: Vacant since 19 August 2024
- Administrator: Bilkis Jahan Shirin, BNP since 16 March 2026
- Deputy Mayor: Vacant since 19 August 2024
- Chief Executive Officer: Md. Rezaul Bari since 3 March 2024

Structure
- Seats: Vacant seats 40 councillors
- Length of term: Up to five years

Elections
- Voting system: First past the post
- First election: 24 April 2003
- Last election: 12 June 2023
- Next election: TBD

Meeting place
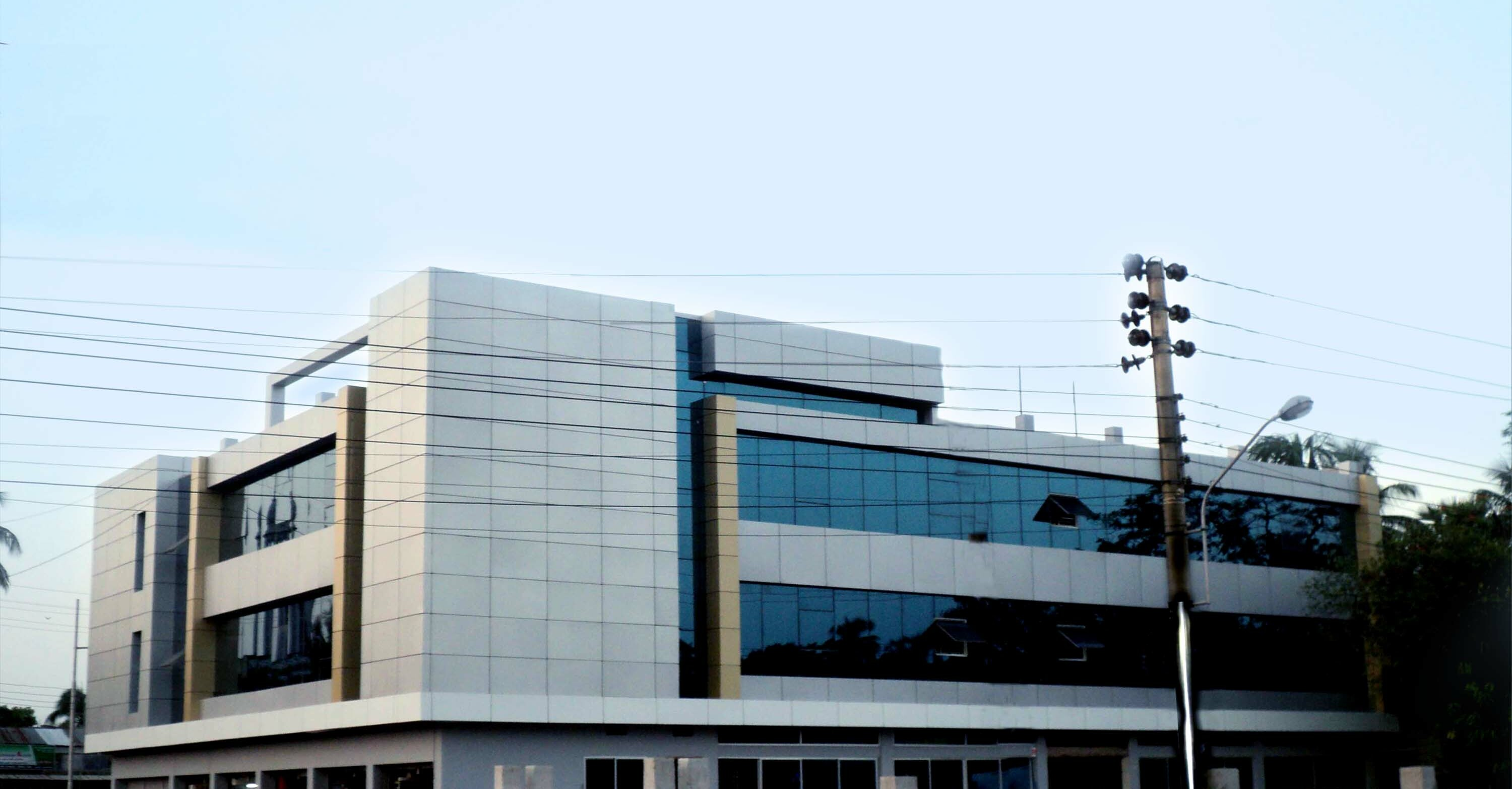
- Nagar Bhaban, Barisal

Website
- barishalcity.gov.bd

Barishal City Corporation (Bengali: বরিশাল সিটি কর্পোরেশন - in short: BCC) is a local government authority responsible for administering all civic services in the city of Barisal, in south-central Bangladesh. The BCC government is elected by popular vote every five years. The corporation is headed by a mayor, who oversees a council consisting of 40 councillors representing different wards of the city. The functions and powers of the BCC are defined under the provisions of the City Corporation Act, 2009.

The corporation covers an area of over 58 square kilometers in the Barisal District where over five million people live as permanent residents. The body was known as Barisal Municipality previously, until it obtained the city corporation status by a ministry of local government declaration on 25 July 2002.

== History ==
To provide civil service and facilities to the inhabitants, Barisal Town Committee was formed in 1969 under Act VI of 1868 (B.C.) with the district magistrate as its chairman. J. C. Price was the first chairman of the town committee. It was upgraded to Barisal municipality in 1876 under the Municipal Act of 1876. It was then managed by a committee, of which the district magistrate was president, and was aided by government with establishment grants. It remained as a municipality for over 130 years though the number of population have been rising with time. Later in 2001, the ministry of local government meeting on declared to turn two divisional headquarters, Barisal and Sylhet to city corporations and passed "Barisal City Corporation Act, 2001". An administrative move was made abolishing the Barisal Municipality as the final step to introduce the administrative body as a city corporation. On 25 July 2002, the municipality was officially upgraded as Barisal City Corporation.

== Administration ==
The city corporation is run by a joint staff of elected public representatives and government officials. Officials both come from departmental recruitment and the administrative cadre service of the country. The area of BCC is divided into 4 thanas: Kotwali, Kawnia, Bandar and Airport. The thanas are subdivided into 30 wards and 225 mahallas. It is administrated by 30 councilors, 9 woman councilors and the mayor elected in the local government election for a five-year tenure.

== Functions and Services ==
The Barishal City Corporation (BCC) is responsible for administering the city and ensuring the provision of essential infrastructure and public services. Its functions include urban planning, transport management, healthcare, education, waste management, water supply, and security. Through these services, BCC aims to improve the quality of life for residents and promote sustainable urban development.

Departments of Barishal City Corporation
#	Departments	Functions / Services
1	Office of the Mayor	Executive administration; city governance; supervision of all BCC services
2	Chief Executive Office	Departmental coordination; service implementation monitoring
3	Administration And Establishment	HR management; staff recruitment; service delivery monitoring
4	Finance and Accounts	Budget preparation; financial planning; payment processing; accounts management; internal audit
5	Engineering	Road-cutting permission; building design approval; contractor registration; land demarcation certificates
6	Urban Planning and Development	Road, drain, bridge, culvert and footpath development; land development; planned residential areas; city beautification
7	Electricity	Installation and maintenance of street lights; lamp-post management; city illumination
8	Transportation and Communication	Urban transport management; traffic & parking control; emergency transport; corpse handling; bus terminal management; road roller & ambulance services
9	Waste Management and Cleaning	Solid waste collection and disposal; street cleaning; drain clearing; mosquito control; landfill management
10	Health	Hospital & clinic management; maternal & child immunization; vitamin A campaigns; midwifery and health technology training
11	Registrar	Birth & death certificates; nationality, inheritance & character certificates
12	Education	Management of schools, madrasas, Sanskrit tolls, kindergartens, technical institutes; adult education; teacher training; cultural & theatre institutes
13	Water Supply and Sewerage	Clean water supply and sewerage management in the entire city corporation.
14	Revenue	Trade license issuance & renewal; holding tax collection; shop/market allotment; lease and asset management
15	Security and Law and Order	City security; joint operations with BMP; CCTV installation and monitoring
16	Magistracy	Arbitration-based case settlement; mobile courts; anti-adulteration drives
17	Housing and Public Works	Distribution and maintenance of residential plots and flats
18	Cultural and Social Development	National Day celebrations; charity programs; and children’s park and playground construction & maintenance
19	Environmental Protection	Pollution control; climate change mitigation; urban greening; tree plantation
20	Religious Welfare	Support for Eid, Puja, and religious events; Qurbani market permissions; land allocation for religious events

== Annual budget ==
Barishal City Corporation (BCC) has announced a budget of ৳257.65 crore (US$21 million) for 2025-2026 fiscal year.

== Wards and councillors ==
Barishal City Corporation is administratively divided into 30 wards. Each ward is represented by one elected councillor, while additional reserved women councillors are elected for groups of wards, as provided under the Local Government (City Corporation) Act.

=== Councillors of Barishal City Corporation ===
Ward	Locations covered	Councillor	Party
Ward-1	BM College area	Vacant	TBD
Ward-2	Alekanda	Vacant	TBD
Ward-3	Rupatali north	Vacant	TBD
Ward-4	Kaunia	Vacant	TBD
Ward-5	Karnakathi riverbank	Vacant	TBD
Ward-6	Barishal riverfront north	Vacant	TBD
Ward-7	Sagardi	Vacant	TBD
Ward-8	Town Hall area	Vacant	TBD
Ward-9	Barishal Stadium area	Vacant	TBD
Ward-10	Sadar Road area	Vacant	TBD
Ward-11	Niamati	Vacant	TBD
Ward-12	Sher-e-Bangla Medical College area	Vacant	TBD
Ward-13	Chawk Bazar	Vacant	TBD
Ward-14	Kakoli	Vacant	TBD
Ward-15	Bogura Road area	Vacant	TBD
Ward-16	Amtala	Vacant	TBD
Ward-17	Kalibari Road area	Vacant	TBD
Ward-18	College Road area	Vacant	TBD
Ward-19	Launch Ghat / Port area	Vacant	TBD
Ward-20	BM College south	Vacant	TBD
Ward-21	Barishal Sadar central	Vacant	TBD
Ward-22	Kashipur	Vacant	TBD
Ward-23	Dapdapia / Dargabari	Vacant	TBD
Ward-24	Rupatali south	Vacant	TBD
Ward-25	Rupatali riverbank	Vacant	TBD
Ward-26	Kawnia south-west fringe	Vacant	TBD
Ward-27	Charkaua west	Vacant	TBD
Ward-28	Charkaua north	Vacant	TBD
Ward-29	Airport road area	Vacant	TBD
Ward-30	Airport / northern fringe	Vacant	TBD
Reserved women's seats
31	Women's seat-1	Vacant	TBD
32	Women's seat-2	Vacant	TBD
33	Women's seat-3	Vacant	TBD
34	Women's seat-4	Vacant	TBD
35	Women's seat-5	Vacant	TBD
36	Women's seat-6	Vacant	TBD
37	Women's seat-7	Vacant	TBD
38	Women's seat-8	Vacant	TBD
39	Women's seat-9	Vacant	TBD
40	Women's seat-10	Vacant	TBD

== List of mayors ==
Political parties

- Bangladesh Awami League
- Bangladesh Nationalist Party

Status

Acting Mayor and Administrator

No.	Portrait	Officeholder (birth–death)	Election	Term of office			Designation	Political party	Reference
No.	Portrait	Officeholder (birth–death)	Election	From	To	Period	Designation	Political party	Reference
1		Ahsan Habib Kamal (1954–2022)	–	25 July 2002	14 July 2003	354 days	Mayor	Bangladesh Nationalist Party	
2		Mazibur Rahman Sarwar	2003	24 April 2003	21 April 2007	3 years, 362 days	Mayor	Bangladesh Nationalist Party	
–		Awlad Hossain Dilu	–	22 July 2007	11 September 2008	1 year, 51 days	Acting Mayor	Bangladesh Nationalist Party	
3		Shawkat Hossain Hiron (1956–2014)	2008	11 September 2008	15 June 2013	4 years, 277 days	Mayor	Bangladesh Awami League	
4		Ahsan Habib Kamal (1954–2022)	2013	15 June 2013	8 October 2018	5 years, 115 days	Mayor	Bangladesh Nationalist Party	
5		Serniabat Sadiq Abdullah	2018	31 October 2018	9 November 2023	7 years, 226 days	Mayor	Bangladesh Awami League	
6		Abul Khair Abdullah	2023	14 November 2023	19 August 2024	279 days	Mayor	Bangladesh Awami League	
–		Md. Shaukat Ali	–	19 August 2024	Incumbent	1 year, 299 days	Administrator	Independent	

== Deputies ==
The deputy mayor (also known as Panel mayor) is a second-ranking official of city corporation. 3 Panel mayors are appointed from the council member to assist the mayor through voting. The 1st panel mayor with the highest number of votes is appointed as deputy mayor or acting mayor. In the absence of the mayor, the deputy mayor controls all functions of the City Corporation. Other 2 Panel mayors also assist mayor and to oversee major offices within the executive branch of the BCC.

Serial No.	Post	Name
01	Panel Mayor 1	Vacant
02	Panel Mayor 2	Vacant
03	Panel Mayor 3	Vacant

== Past elections ==
=== Election Result 2023 ===
Barisal Mayoral Election 2023
Party	Candidate	Votes	%	±%
AL	Abul Khair Abdullah	87,752	62.99	−15.93
IAB	Syed Faizul Karim	34,345	24.65	+14.33
Independent	Kamrul Ahsan	7,999	5.74	New
JP(E)	Iqbal Hossain Taposh	6,665	4.78	New
Zaker Party	Mizanur Rahman Bachchu	2,546	1.83	New
Majority		53,407	38.34	−31.21
Turnout		142,177	51.46	−6.09
Registered electors		276,298		
AL hold				

=== Election result 2018 ===
Barisal Mayoral Election 2018
Party	Candidate	Votes	%	±%
AL	Serniabat Sadiq Abdullah	109,803	78.92	+34.28
BNP	Mujibur Rahman Sarwar	13,041	9.37	−45.99
Majority		96,762	69.55	+58.83
Turnout		139,151	57.55	−13.23
Registered electors		241,959		
AL gain from BNP				

=== Election result 2013 ===
Barisal Mayoral Election 2013
Party	Candidate	Votes	%	±%
BNP	Ahsan Habib Kamal	82,751	55.35	+33.23
AL	Shawkat Hossain Hiron	66,741	44.65	+5.47
Majority		16,010	10.70	New
Turnout		149,492	70.76	+4.62
Registered electors		211,257		
BNP gain from AL				

=== Election result 2008 ===
Barisal Mayoral Election 2008
Party	Candidate	Votes	%	±%
AL	Shawkat Hossain Hiron	46,795	39.18	New
PDP	Sharfuddin Ahmed Santu	46,208	38.69	New
BNP	Ahsan Habib Kamal	26,416	22.12	New
Majority		587	0.49	New
Turnout		119,419	66.14	New
Registered electors		180,545		
AL gain from BNP				

== See also ==
- List of city corporations in Bangladesh
- Barisal Division

== Notes ==
- ^{a} Ahsan Habib Kamal served as acting mayor from when Barisal City Corporation was created until the first city election could be held.
- ^{b} Awlad Hossain Dilu served as acting mayor while Sarwar was under arrest.
