= Sunil Kumar Gupta =

Bangladeshi politician

Member of Parliament from Barisal-5
- In office 1979–1982
- Preceded by: Abdul Mannan Howlader
- Succeeded by: M. Matiur Rahman

Member of Parliament from Barisal-1
- In office 1986–1990
- Preceded by: Mosharraf Hossain Shahjahan
- Succeeded by: Abul Hasnat Abdullah

Minister of Fisheries and Livestock
- In office 1986–1990

State Minister for Power, Energy and Mineral Resources
- In office 1981–1982

Personal details
- Born: 7 July 1914 Backergunge District, Bengal Presidency, British India
- Died: 29 April 2009 (aged 94) BIRDEM, Bangladesh
- Party: Jatiya Party (Ershad)
- Other political affiliations: Bangladesh Nationalist Party
- Relations: Dr. Ashok Gupta (Son)

Sunil Kumar Gupta (7 July 1914 – 29 April 2009) was a Jatiya Party (Ershad) politician and a member of parliament for Barisal-1 and Barisal-5. He was an organizer of the Liberation War of Bangladesh.

== Early life ==
Sunil Kumar Gupta was born on 7 July 1914 in Barisal District.

== Career ==
Gupta was elected a member of parliament from Barisal-5 as a Bangladesh Nationalist Party candidate in 1979 Bangladeshi general election. He was elected to parliament from Barisal-1 as a Jatiya Party candidate in 1986 and 1988. He served as the cabinet minister in several ministries during Bangladesh Nationalist Party and Jatiya Party rule (1979 to 1990).

== Personal life ==
Sunil Gupta was married to Mrs Kamala Gupta and left behind four sons, two daughters and fourteen grandchildren. His eldest son, Mr Samir Gupta is a businessman, managing director of one of the garments factories of Bangladesh. His second son Dr. Ashok Kumar Gupta is the chairman of Bangladesh Trading Corporation- BTC Group, who is the permanent member of UN Info academy.

== Death ==
Sunil Kumar Gupta died on 29 April 2009. On 30 April, his funeral took place at his ancestral home in Barisal.
