= Administrative geography of Bangladesh =

Subdivisions of Bangladesh
- Location: Bangladesh
Subdivisions
- - Type: Number
  - Divisions: 8
  - Districts: 64
  - Upazilas: 503
  - City Corporations: 13
  - Pourashovas: 330
  - Union Parishads: 4,599

Bangladesh is divided into 8 divisions and 64 districts, although these have a limited role in public policy. For the purpose of local governance, the country is divided into upazilas, city corporations, pourashovas (or town councils) and union parishads (i.e., rural councils).

The diagram below outlines the five tiers of government in Bangladesh.

Central government
8 Divisions
64 Districts ("Zila")
503 Upazila
4,599 Union Parishad (Rural area)	330 Pourashova (Towns)	13 City corporations (Metropolis)
Villages	Municipal wards	City wards

== Regions and proposed provinces ==
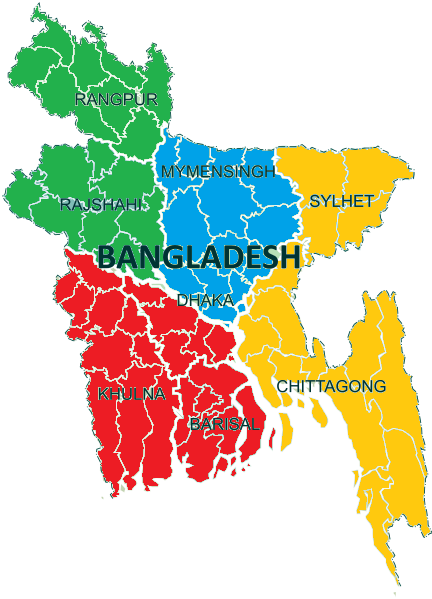
Regions of Bangladesh: Northern Bengal Southern Bengal Central Bengal Eastern Bengal

Traditionally, Bangladesh has been divided into four regions by the fertile Ganges-Brahmaputra delta; formed by the confluence of the Ganges (local name Padma or Pôdda), Brahmaputra (Jamuna or Jomuna), and Meghna rivers and their various tributaries.

In 2025, the Public Administration Reform Commission proposed the formation of four provinces to the government. These four provinces are:

- Northern Bengal or North Bengal Province: includes Rajshahi Division and Rangpur Division. With proposed capital at Rajshahi.
- Eastern Bengal: also known as eastern Bangladesh, its composed of Chittagong Division, Sylhet Division and proposed Comilla Division, and known for the Surma-Meghna River System. With proposed capital at Chittagong.
- Central Bengal: also known as Central Bengal Region, and composed of Mymensingh Division and Dhaka Division, excluding proposed Faridpur Division. With proposed capital at Dhaka.
- Southern Bengal: composed of Barisal Division, Khulna Division and proposed Faridpur Division. With proposed capital at Khulna.

== Divisions ==
Divisions of Bangladesh

Proposed Divisions of Bangladesh by Public Administration Reform Commission

Bangladesh is divided into eight major administrative divisions. Each division is named after the major city within its jurisdiction that serves as the administrative capital of that division:

- Barisal
- Chittagong
- Dhaka
- Khulna
- Mymensingh
- Rajshahi
- Rangpur
- Sylhet

Proposed divisions

- Cumilla Division – proposed to consist of six northwestern districts of the existing Chittagong Division
- Faridpur Division – proposed to consist of five southern districts of the existing Dhaka Division

== Districts ==
Districts of Bangladesh

The divisions are divided into 64 districts. Each district is run by a deputy commissioner (popularly abbreviated to "DC") who is appointed by the government from a deputy secretary of Bangladesh Civil Service's administrative cadre.

Division	Districts	Name of Districts
Barisal	6	Barguna, Barisal, Bhola, Jhalokati, Patuakhali, Pirojpur
Chittagong	11	Bandarban, Brahmanbaria, Chandpur, Chittagong, Comilla, Cox's Bazar, Feni, Khagrachari, Lakshmipur, Noakhali, Rangamati
Dhaka	13	Dhaka, Faridpur, Gazipur, Gopalganj, Kishoreganj, Madaripur, Manikganj, Munshiganj, Narayanganj, Narsingdi, Rajbari, Shariatpur, Tangail
Khulna	10	Bagerhat, Chuadanga, Jessore, Jhenaidah, Khulna, Kushtia, Magura, Meherpur, Narail, Satkhira
Mymensingh	4	Jamalpur, Mymensingh, Netrokona, Sherpur
Rajshahi	8	Bogura, Jaipurhat, Naogaon, Natore, Nawabganj, Pabna, Rajshahi, Sirajganj
Rangpur	8	Dinajpur, Gaibandha, Kurigram, Lalmonirhat, Nilphamari, Panchagarh, Rangpur, Thakurgaon
Sylhet	4	Habiganj, Moulvibazar, Sunamganj, Sylhet

== Upazilas ==
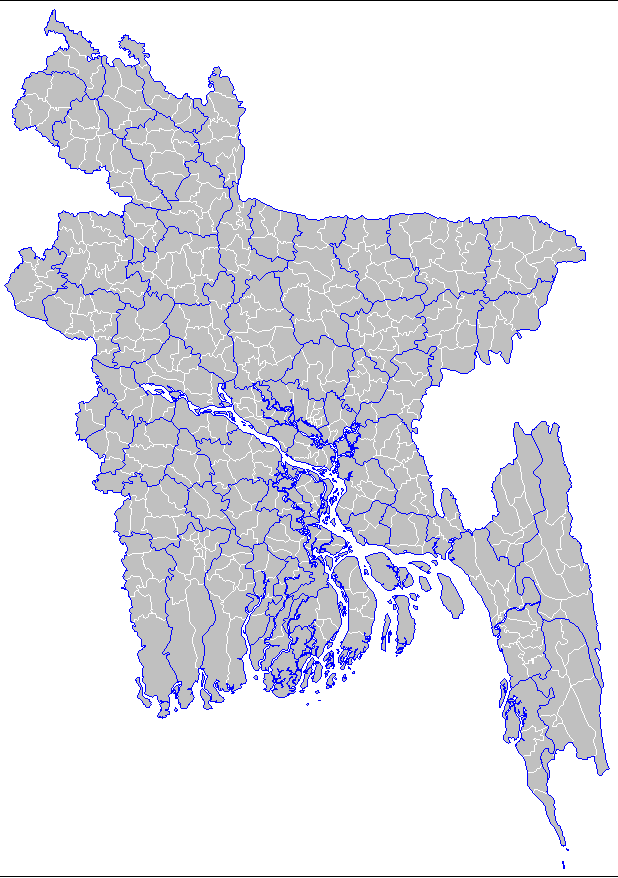
Subdistricts of Bangladesh, divided by white lines

The districts are divided into sub-districts called upazilas. Upazilas are similar to the county subdivisions found in some Western countries. Bangladesh has 500 upazilas (as of May 2026). The upazilas are the second lowest tier of regional administration in Bangladesh. Like India, City corporations do not fit neatly into upazilas, despite some deemed as "sadar", indicating urban characteristics.

Upazilas were formerly known as thana which literally means police station. Despite the meaning, thanas functioned much as an administrative and geographic region, much as today's upazilas. In 1982, thanas were re-termed to upazilas with provisions for semi-autonomous local governance. This system was reverted to the thana system in 1992. Later in 1999, geographic regions under administrations of thanas were converted into upazilas. Administrative terms in this level were renamed from thana to upazila. For instance, Thana Nirbahi Officer (lit. Thana Executive Officer) was renamed to upazila Nirbahi Officer (lit. Upazila Executive Officer). The word thana is now used to solely refer to police stations. Generally, there is one police station for each upazila; but larger administrative units may have more than one police station covering different regions and urban thanas may retain administrative value.

The upazila is administered by Upazila Nirbahi Officer (UNO) and upazila parishad. UNOs are Senior Assistant Secretary of Bangladesh Civil Service (BCS). Each upazila parishad (or council) has a chairman, a vice-chairman and a woman vice-chairman. All three are elected through direct popular election.

The sub-districts are further subdivided into 4,599 rural councils and 330 municipalities.

== Rural blocks, cities and towns ==
=== City corporations ===
The cities with a city corporation, having mayoral elections, include Dhaka South, Dhaka North, Chittagong, Khulna, Sylhet, Rajshahi, Barisal, Rangpur, Comilla, Narayanganj, Mymensingh, Gazipur and Bagura. The city corporation are divided into wards, which are further divided into mahallas. Direct elections are held for each ward, electing a councillor. The city mayors are elected for a span of five years.

=== Municipal corporations ===
In the metropolitan areas, excluding the cities with city corporations, have municipal corporations, also known as Paurasabha. Paurasabhas are divided into wards, which are further divided into Mauzas and Mahallas. Direct elections are held for each ward, electing a chairperson and a number of members. The municipal heads are elected for a span of five years.

=== Union councils ===
Union councils (or union parishads or unions) are the smallest rural administrative and local government units in Bangladesh. Each union is made up of nine wards. Usually one village is designated as a Ward. There are 4,578 unions in Bangladesh. A Union Council consists of a chairman and twelve members including three members exclusively reserved for women. Union Parishads are formed under the Local Government (Union Parishads) Act, 2009. The boundary of each Union is demarcated by the Deputy Commissioner of the District. A Union Council is the body primarily responsible for agricultural, industrial and community development within the local limits of the union.

== Non–elective ceremonial units ==
=== Mahallas ===
Mahalla is an administrative unit in Bangladesh, an upazila/thana consists of unions, municipalities, wards, villages and mahallas and mouzas.

=== Mouzas ===
Mouza is an administrative unit in Bangladesh, an upazila/thana consists of unions, municipalities, wards, villages and mahallas and mouzas.

== Historical administrative divisions ==
- Chakla
- Mahakuma
- Pargana
- Sarkar
- Thanas

== See also ==
- Local government in Bangladesh
