= Abul Hasanat Abdullah =

Serniabat family member and Former Bangladeshi politician (born 1944)

- আবুল হাসনাত আব্দুল্লাহ
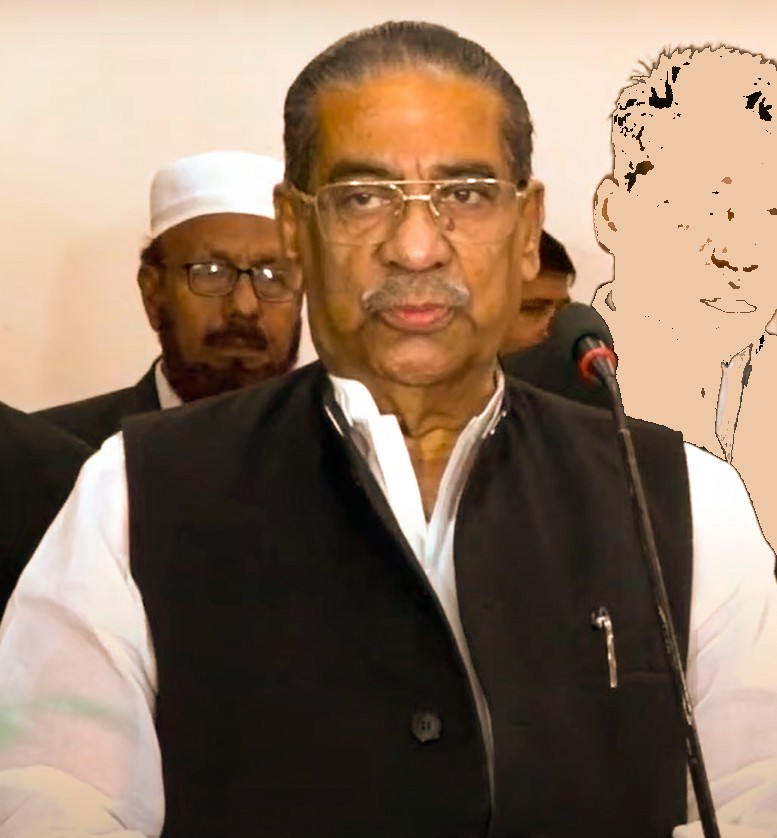
- Abdullah (2022)

Member of Parliament
- In office 29 January 2014 – 6 August 2024
- Preceded by: Talukder Md. Younus
- Constituency: Barisal-1
- In office 14 July 1996 – 13 July 2001
- Preceded by: Zahir Uddin Swapan
- Succeeded by: Zahir Uddin Swapan
- Constituency: Barisal-1
- In office 5 March 1991 – 24 November 1995
- Preceded by: Sunil Kumar Gupta
- Succeeded by: Zahir Uddin Swapan
- Constituency: Barisal-1

6th Chief Whip of Parliament
- In office 14 July 1996 – 13 July 2001
- Speaker: Humayun Rashid Choudhury; Mohammad Abdul Hamid
- Preceded by: Khandaker Delwar Hossain
- Succeeded by: Khandaker Delwar Hossain

Personal details
- Born: 10 December 1944 (age 81)
- Party: Bangladesh Awami League
- Spouse: Sahan Ara Abdullah
- Relations: Abul Khair Abdullah (brother); Jahangir Kabir Nanak (cousin)
- Children: Serniabat Sadiq Abdullah
- Parent: Abdur Rab Serniabat (father)
- Relatives: see Sheikh family of Tungipara
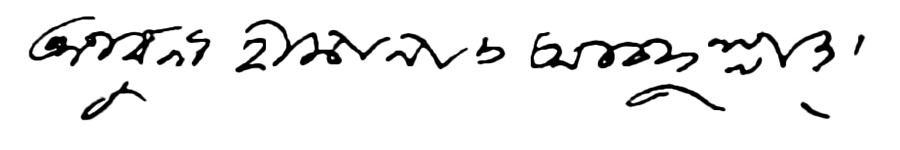
- Signature

Abul Hasanat Abdullah (born 10 December 1944) is a Bangladesh Awami League politician and a former Jatiya Sangsad member representing the Barisal-1 constituency for five terms. He is an Executive Committee Member of Bangladesh Awami League Central Committee.

== Background ==
Abdullah was born on 10 December 1944 to the Bengali Muslim Serniabat family of Sheral, Agailjhara in the Backergunge District of the Bengal Presidency. The family were direct descendants of Emperor Sher Shah Suri. His father, Abdur Rab Serniabat, was a former minister in the second, third and fourth Mujib ministries. Abdullah's mother Sheikh Amena Begum belonged to the Sheikh family of Tungipara and was the sister of Sheikh Mujibur Rahman.

Abdullah's father, siblings, cousin and son were killed during the assassination of Sheikh Mujibur Rahman, whilst his mother, wife and other siblings were injured. His younger brother, Abul Khair Abdullah, is also a politician.

== Career ==
Hasanat was elected Upazila Chairman in Barisal in 1973.

In 1975, his father, Abdur Rab Serniabat, was killed in the 15 August 1975 Bangladesh coup d'état. His mother and siblings were also killed in the coup. He and his family members fled Bangladesh. The new Government of Bangladesh declared his land vested property and took over them. In 2001, the land was returned to him. Gournadi Pourasabha Bangladesh Nationalist Party president Hannan Sharif announced the 25 decimals of the property belonged to Roads and Highways Department according to the records of the Land Revenue Department. Sharif started building the local office of the Bangladesh Nationalist Party office with the permission of Upazila Nirbahi Officer Mahfuzur Rahman.

Hasanat was first elected as member of parliament from Barisal-1 in 1991. In January 2000, he was appointed member of the parliamentary standing committee for home ministry. He served as the chief whip of parliament at the Awami league government from 1996 to 2001.

In October 2002, during Operation Clean Heart, Abdullah's house in Barisal City was raided by security personal led by Major Akbor and Major Shariar. The police recovered two guns, bullets, Tk 613 thousand in cash, gold ornaments, and 355 blank freedom fighter certificate.

Hasanat was the general secretary of Barisal District unit of Bangladesh Awami League. On 12 November 2007, his properties from his house in 25, Kalabagan Lake Circus Road in Dhanmondi were attached to Dhanmondi Police Station on court orders.

In 2008, Hasanat was nominated by Bangladesh Awami League in Barisal-1 and Barisal-2. His nomination was opposed by local activists of Bangladesh Awami League, who wanted more popular candidates.

On 11 June 2009, Awami League government dropped 62 legal cases against Awami League politicians including four against Hasanat.

On 24 March 2014, Hasanat was accused of facilitating the victory of Golam Mortuja Khan in the Upazlia Chairman election through vote rigging.

Hasanat was elected to Jatiya Sangsad from Barisal-1 constituency in 2014, 2018 and 2024. On 18 January 2018, he was made the convener of the National Committee on Chittagong Hill Tracts with the rank of a government minister.

== Personal life ==
Hasanat's son, Serniabat Sadiq Abdullah, was elected mayor of Barisal in July 2018. The other son, Moin Abdullah, was arrested in October 2024.
