= Mazibur Rahman Sarwar =

Bangladeshi politician

- মজিবর রহমান সরোয়ার

Member of the Bangladesh Parliament for Barisal-5
- Incumbent
- Assumed office 17 February 2026
- Preceded by: Abdur Rahman Biswas
- In office 20 March 1991 – 30 March 1996
- Preceded by: Zaheed Farooque
- Succeeded by: Nasim Biswas
- In office 12 May 1998 – 9 January 2014
- Preceded by: Nasim Biswas
- Succeeded by: Shawkat Hossain Hiron

2nd Mayor of Barisal
- In office 24 April 2003 – 21 Apri 2007
- Preceded by: Ahsan Habib Kamal
- Succeeded by: Awlad Hossain Dilu

Personal details
- Born: 1 October 1957 (age 69) Barisal, East Pakistan
- Party: Bangladesh Nationalist Party

Mazibur Rahman Sarwar is a Bangladeshi politician and joint secretary general of the Bangladesh Nationalist Party (BNP). He is the former mayor of Barishal City Corporation and a former member of parliament from Barisal-5.

== Career ==
Sarwar was elected to parliament from Barisal-5 as a Bangladesh Nationalist Party candidate in 1991, 1998, 2001, and 2008. He is the joint secretary general of the Bangladesh Nationalist Party.

In 2018, Sarwar contested the Barisal City mayoral election but withdrew before the voting was completed, alleging irregularities with the voting. He was nominated by the Bangladesh Nationalist Party to contest the 2018 general election from Barisal-5.
