= Abdur Rab Serniabat =

Bangladeshi politician

Abdur Rob Serniabat
- আব্দুর রব সেরনিয়াবাত

Personal details
- Born: 4 April 1921 Seral, Backergunge District, Bengal Presidency
- Died: 15 August 1975 (aged 54) Dacca, Bangladesh
- Cause of death: Assassination
- Party: Bangladesh Awami League
- Children: Abul Hasanat Abdullah; Abul Khair Abdullah
- Relatives: Sheikh family of Tungipara (in-laws); Serniabat Sadiq Abdullah (grandson); Jahangir Kabir Nanak (nephew)
- Education: Brojomohun College
- Alma mater: University of Dacca; Calcutta Islamia College
- Awards: Independence Award

Abdur Rob Serniabat (4 April 1921-1975) was a Bangladeshi politician and the former water resources minister. He was the brother-in-law of Sheikh Mujibur Rahman, founding father of Bangladesh, and the maternal uncle of Sheikh Hasina, the five-time Prime Minister of Bangladesh. He was killed during the assassination of Sheikh Mujibur Rahman on 15 August 1975.

== Early life ==
Serniabat was born on 4 April 1921 to the Bengali Muslim Serniabat family of Seral, Agailjhara, in the Backergunge District of the Bengal Presidency. The family were direct descendants of Emperor Sher Shah Suri. He passed his matriculation from Chadshi High School in Gauranadi or Bhola High School, Intermediate of Arts from Brojomohun College, Bachelor of Arts from Calcutta Islamia College, and Bachelor of Laws from the University of Dacca.

== Career ==
At early stages in his career, Abdur Rob Serniabat was a lawyer in the city of Barishal. He later stepped into politics, becoming general secretary of the Ganatantri Party from 1956. Serniabat then joined the central committee of the National Awami Party when it formed in 1957. In 1969, he joined the East Pakistan Awami League and was elected to the National Assembly of Pakistan at the 1970 Pakistani general election, but this assembly was never formed. It led to the Bangladesh Liberation War in 1971, where Serniabat served as the chairman of the Barisal South Zonal Council and remained a member of the Awami League central working committee.

After independence, he carried out his appointed role as the minister of water resources. He later joined the Bangladesh Krishak Sramik Awami League.

== Death ==
His house on 27 Minto Road, Dhaka, was attacked at about 5:00 AM by soldiers commanded by Major Shahriar Rashid, Major Aziz Pasha, Captain Nurul Huda, and Captain Majed. Abdur Rob Serniabat, daughter Baby Serniabat, son Arif Serniabat, nephew Shaheed Serniabat, and grandson Sukanto Babu were among those killed, while his wife Amena Begum, Shahan Ara Begum, Abul Hasnat Abdullah's wife daughter Beauty Serniabat were injured along with others in the house. His sons Abul Hasnat Abdullah and Abul Khair Abdullah, and granddaughter Kanta Abdullah also survived. A case was filed regarding this incident at Ramna Police Station on 21 October 1996, convicting 18 people. His son Abul Hasnat Abdullah was elected a member of parliament in 2014. His house is now part of the headquarters complex of Dhaka Metropolitan Police. On 30 July 2018, his grandson, Serniabat Sadiq Abdullah, was elected mayor of Barisal. His daughter is married to the brother of MP Mahbubul Alam Hanif.

== Legacy ==
Shaheed Abdur Rob Serniabat Stadium at Barishal Division in Bangladesh is named after him. SARSTEC, a technological college for textiles education that is located at the same division, has also been named in his honour.
