= Syed Moazzem Hossain Alal =

Bangladeshi politician

- সৈয়দ মোয়াজ্জেম হোসেন আলাল
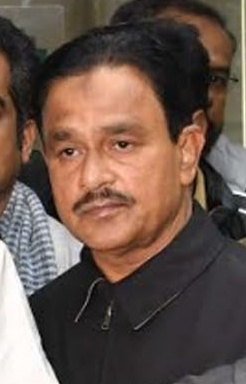
- Alal in 2018

Member of Bangladesh Parliament
- In office February 1996 – Jun 1996
- Preceded by: Rashed Khan Menon
- Succeeded by: Golam Faruque Ovi
- In office 2001–2006
- Preceded by: Golam Faruque Ovi
- Succeeded by: Manirul Islam

Personal details
- Born: December 31, 1955 (age 70) Barisal, Bangladesh
- Party: Bangladesh Nationalist Party

Syed Moazzem Hossain Alal (born December 31, 1955) is a Bangladeshi politician, lawyer. He is a former Member of Parliament represented Barisal-2, after being elected in the February 1996 and 2001 general elections. He previously served as president of the Bangladesh Nationalist Party's youth wing, Bangladesh Jatiotabadi Jubodal, and as the party's joint secretary general. He is an adviser to Bangladesh Nationalist Party chairperson and Prime Minister of Bangladesh Tarique Rahman.

== Early life ==
Alal was born on 31 December 1955 in Barisal, East Pakistan, Pakistan. He was a student activist of Barisal BM College. He completed his bachelor's and master's in economics at the University of Dhaka. He was associated with the Bangladesh Chhatra Union but left it in 1973. He then finished his law degree.

== Career ==
Alal joined the Barisal District unit of the Bangladesh Jatiotabadi Jubodal in 1978. He was elected to parliament from Barisal-2 in the 15 February 1996 general election.

Alal was elected to parliament from Barisal-2 as a Bangladesh Nationalist Party candidate in 2001. Alal was arrested in February 2008 by Bangladesh Police from his residence in Lalmatia under the Emergency Powers Rules. Another case was filed against him for allegedly harassing Lieutenant General (retired) Mahbubur Rahman, former chief of Bangladesh Army, while he was leaving the Mausoleum of Ziaur Rahman after paying his respects on 7 November 2007. He was then the general secretary of the Jatiyatabadi Jubo Dal. In 2010, he was appointed President of the Jatiyatabadi Jubo Dal while Saiful Alam Nirob was appointed it's general secretary. He contested the 2008 general election from Dhaka-13 against Awami League candidate Jahangir Kabir Nanak who was also from Barisal.

In November 2017, Bangladesh High Court declared the government preventing Alal from traveling outside the country to be illegal. His lawyers alleged in court that he was prevent from leaving Bangladesh 17 times by the government since 2013. He did not contest the 2018 Bangladeshi general election. In February 2018, he was detained by Bangladesh Police from the protest of the Bangladesh Nationalist Party against the Awami League government decision to not allow rally against the conviction of former Prime Minister and party chairperson Khaleda Zia. In November 2019, he criticized the Awami League government for not allowing freedom of thought after a protest of the party in Brahmanbaria was cut short by Bangladesh Police.

In December 2021, Saiful Islam, President of the Khulna District Lawyers’ Association, filed a case against Alal over comments he made on Prime Minister Sheikh Hasina and Prime Minister of India Narendra Modi that circulated on social media. Two other cases were filed in Jessore and Barisal. Alal subsequently apologised for the remarks and said that he was receiving medical treatment at Apollo Hospital Chennai.

Alal left the President of the Jatiyatabadi Jubo Dal post after he was appointed the Joint Secretary General of Bangladesh Nationalist Party. On 31 October 2023, he was detained by Detective Branch over a case involving clash at a rally of the Bangladesh Nationalist Party in Naya Paltan. His detention was confirmed by chief of the Detective Branch Harun-or-Rashid along with detention of fellow Bangladesh Nationalist Party leader Mirza Abbas. He was sentenced to three years imprisonment in December 2023 in the case over the clash at a rally of the Bangladesh Nationalist Party. He was released on bail on 21 February 2024.

After the fall of the Sheikh Hasina led Awami League government, Alal called on the Muhammad Yunus led Interim government to return the Khaleda Zia her cantonment home from which she was evicted in 2010. He called on the Awami League to apologies to fellow Bangladeshis and distance itself from Hasina's leadership.

In 2026, Alal is an advisor to Bangladesh Nationalist Party chairperson Tarique Rahman.
