= Jebunnesa Afroz =

Bangladeshi politician

Member of Parliament
- In office 22 June 2014 – 29 December 2018
- Constituency: Barisal-5

Personal details
- Born: Barisal
- Party: Bangladesh Awami League
- Spouse: Shawkat Hossain Hiron

Jebunnesa Afroz is a Bangladesh Awami League politician who was a member of parliament in the 10th session of the parliament. She was elected from Barisal-5.

== Biography ==
Afroz was married to Shawkat Hossain Hiron. He was a politician of the Bangladesh Awami League and member of parliament from the Barisal-5 constituency of Barisal District. He died on 9 April 2014 and left the seat of Barisal-5 vacant. A by-election was declared for the constituency for which she announced her candidacy. She won the nomination of the Bangladesh Awami League. She won the election on 15 June 2014. She received about 183 thousand votes compared to her opponent who received about six thousand votes, winning by a landslide. She was sworn into office on 22 June 2014 by Shirin Sharmin Chaudhury, the speaker of the parliament.

On 8 July 2014, Bangladesh High court questioned the legitimacy of qualifications to be a candidate. Her opponent in the election, Saiful Islam Liton, from the Bangladesh Nationalist Front filed a case against her on 8 June 2017. Liton accused Afroz of pressuring the independent candidate, Syed Moazzem Hossain, into stepping down from the election through the usage of information obtained illegally from the Bangladesh Election Commission returning officer. Independent election monitoring organisation Election Working Group also accused the poll of having large irregularities without naming anyone involved.

== Personal life ==
Afroz is married to Shawkat Hossain Hiron. Her husband was the president of Barisal City Awami League and member of parliament from Barisal-5. He was also a former mayor of Barisal City. They have a son Rafsan sajid and a daughter together.
