= Local government in Bangladesh =

- Category: Unitary state
- Location: Bangladesh
- Number: 8 Divisional Commissionerates; 64 District Councils; 495 Sub-district Councils; 4,573 Union Councils; 329 Town Councils; 12 City Councils
- Populations: 3,212 (Union Councils) – 36,054,418 (Divisions)
- Areas: 9 km^{2} (Union Councils) – 7,468 km^{2} (Divisions)
- Government: Council government
- Subdivisions: Villages and Wards

There are 8 divisions and 64 districts in Bangladesh, each district further subdivided into upazila (lit. 'subdistricts'). The area within each subdistrict, except for those in metropolitan areas, is divided into several unions, with each union consisting of multiple villages. Direct elections are held for each union (or ward), electing a chairperson and a number of members. In 1997, a parliamentary act was passed to reserve three seats (out of 12) in every union for female candidates. Following elections in the 2014–16 period, 25.2% (14,763/ 58,543) of councillors were women, up from 23.4% in the 2011–13 period.

In Bangladesh, the rural and regional local government have four tiers:

- Divisional administration
- District administration
- Sub-district administration
- Rural, Municipal and City councils

== Divisional administration ==
The Divisional Commissioner is the administrative head of a division. The Divisional Commissioner is appointed by the government from a Senior secretary of the B.C.S. Administration Cadre. The role of a Divisional Commissioner's office is to act as the supervisory head of all the government offices (except the central government offices) situated in the division. Divisional Commissioner's are given the direct responsibility of supervising the revenue and development administration of a division. The Divisional Commissioner is assisted by the several Additional Divisional Commissioners, Assistant Divisional Commissioners and other bureaucratic officials.

== District administration ==
District Council (or Zila Parishad) is a local government body at the district level. The Bengali word parishad means council and zila parishad translates to district council. The Deputy Commissioner (popularly abbreviated to "DC") is the executive head of the district. The Deputy Commissioner is appointed by the government from a Joint secretary of the B.C.S. Administration Cadre. But Zila Parishad has a different setup from the DC office. Currently, the Chairman of each District Council is an appointee from the Central Government. An officer ranked Deputy Secretary works as the Chief Executive of the council. The District Council, being the highest tier of Local Government, is supposed to be an autonomous and the supreme body to look after the overall development activities in district level. But in practice, it is merely a setup confined with few charitable works.

== Sub-District administration ==
Upazila Nirbahi Officer (UNO, or Upazila Executive Officer; Bengali: উপজেলা নির্বাহী কর্মকর্তা) is a non-elected administrator in Upazila. UNOs are Senior Assistant Secretary of Bangladesh Civil Service (BCS). They act as executive officer of the upazila under the elected posts. Each Upazila Parishad (or council) has a chairman, a vice-chairman and a woman vice-chairman. All three are elected through direct popular election. Union Parishad chairman within the upazila are considered as the members of the porishod. The post of a woman vice-chairman was created to ensure at least one-third woman representation in the all elected posts of the local government. On 22 January 2010 the first election in 18 years of Upazila Porishod was held. One-third of the seats in the Upazila Parishad are reserved for women.

== Local councils ==
=== Village Council ===
Union Councils (or Union Parishads or Unions) are the smallest rural administrative and local government units in Bangladesh. Each Union is made up of nine Wards. Usually one village is designated as a Ward. There are 4,573 Unions in Bangladesh. A Union Council consists of a chairman and twelve members including three members exclusively reserved for women. Union Parishads are formed under the Local Government (Union Parishads) Act, 2009. The boundary of each Union is demarcated by the Deputy Commissioner of the District. A Union Council is the body primarily responsible for agricultural, industrial and community development within the local limits of the union. Under the legislation, 25% of union parishad seats are reserved for women.

=== Town Council ===
In Bangladesh, Municipal Councils or Town Municipalities or Paurasabha or Municipality is an urban local body that administers a city of population 100,000 or more than. The members of the Paurasabha are elected representatives for a term of five years. The town is divided into wards according to its population, and representatives are elected from each ward. The Paurasabha members are known as Councillors. The number of wards in a municipal area is determined by the population of the Town. The Mayor is the executive head of the Municipal Councils are elected for a span of five years.

=== City Council ===
The cities with a city corporation, having mayoral elections, include Dhaka South, Dhaka North, Chattogram, Khulna, Sylhet, Rajshahi, Bogura, Barishal, Rangpur, Cumilla, Mymensingh, Narayanganj and Gazipur. Other major cities, these and other municipalities electing a chairperson, include Faridpur, Jessore, Dinajpur, Pabna, Kushtia, Cox's Bazar, Noakhali, Patuakhali and Rangamati. Both the municipal heads are elected for a span of five years. Due to rapid growth of towns and cities, in sub-urban area, the Union Parishad is frequently replaced by the Municipal Corporations (Pourashava) and City Corporations.

== See also ==
- Administrative geography of Bangladesh
