= Shawkat Hossain Hiron =

Bangladeshi politician

3rd Mayor of Barisal
- In office 4 August 2008 – 15 June 2013
- Preceded by: Awlad Hossain Dilu
- Succeeded by: Ahsan Habib Kamal

Member of Parliament
- In office 5 January 2014 – 9 April 2014
- Preceded by: Majibur Rahman Sarwar
- Succeeded by: Jebunnesa Afroz
- Constituency: Barisal-5

Personal details
- Born: 15 October 1956 Patuakhali, East Pakistan, Pakistan
- Died: 9 April 2014 (aged 57) Apollo Hospital Dhaka, Bangladesh
- Party: Bangladesh Awami League

Shawkat Hossain Hiron (Bengali: শওকত হোসেন হিরণ) was a Bangladesh Awami League politician and member of parliament for Barisal-5.

== Early life ==
Hiron was born on 15 October 1956 in Patuakhali, East Pakistan, Pakistan.

== Career ==
Hiron joined the Jatiya Party (Ershad) in 1986. He joined Bangladesh Awami League 1997. He became the president of the Barisal City unit of the Bangladesh Awami League in 2012. He was elected mayor of Barisal City on 4 August 2008. He lost the reelection of Barisal mayoral election on 15 June 2013. He was elected member of parliament from Barisal-5 on 5 January 2014 uncontested.

== Personal life ==
Hiron was married to Jebunnesa Afroz.

== Death and legacy ==
Hiron died on 9 April 2014 in Apollo Hospital Dhaka, Bangladesh. A by elections was called in his constituency, Barisal-5, after his death. Bangladesh Awami League nominated his wife, Zebunnesa Afroz, to contest the Barisal-5 by election. She won the by-election and was elected to parliament.
