= Ahsan Habib Kamal =

Former mayor of Barisal

- আহসান হাবিব কামাল

4th Mayor of Barisal
- In office 15 June 2013 – 8 October 2018
- Preceded by: Shawkat Hossain Hiron
- Succeeded by: Serniabat Sadiq Abdullah
- In office 25 July 2002 – 14 July 2003
- Preceded by: Post Created
- Succeeded by: Majibur Rahman Sarwar

Personal details
- Born: 1954 Barisal, East Pakistan
- Died: 30 July 2022 (aged 67–68) Banani, Dhaka
- Party: Bangladesh Nationalist Party

Ahsan Habib Kamal (died 30 July 2022) was a Bangladesh Nationalist Party politician and former Mayor of Barisal.

== Death ==
Kamal died on 30 July 2022 in Banani, Dhaka.
