= Abul Khair Abdullah =

Bangladeshi politician

- আবুল খায়ের আবদুল্লাহ
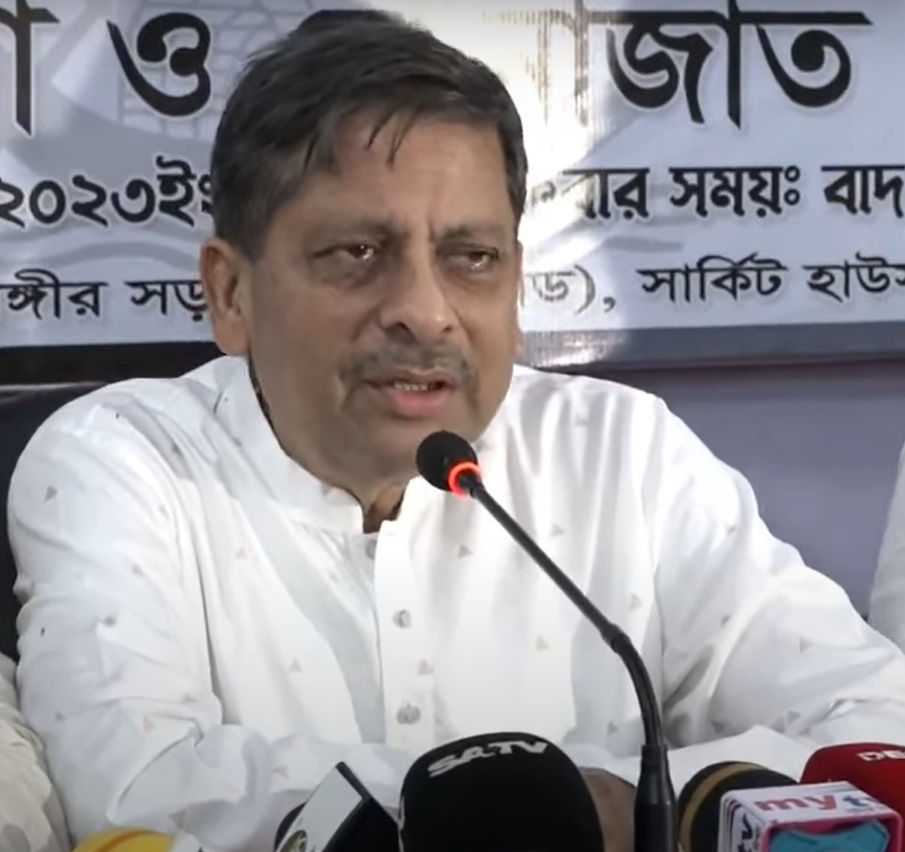

6th Mayor of Barisal
- In office 14 November 2023 – 19 August 2024
- Preceded by: Serniabat Sadiq Abdullah
- Succeeded by: Md. Shaukat Ali (as Administrator)

Personal details
- Born: Barisal, East Bengal now Bangladesh
- Party: Bangladesh Awami League
- Relations: Abul Hasanat Abdullah (brother)
- Parent: Abdur Rab Serniabat (father)
- Relatives: see Sheikh family of Tungipara

Abul Khair Abdullah is a Bangladesh Awami League politician and businessman. He is elected the 5th Mayor of the Barisal City Corporation. He is a brother of Awami League politician Abul Hasanat Abdullah and son of Abdur Rab Serniabat.

== Early life ==
Abdullah was born into the Bengali Muslim Serniabat family of Seral, Agailjhara in the Backergunge District of the Bengal Presidency. The family were direct descendants of Emperor Sher Shah Suri. His father, Abdur Rab Serniabat, was a former minister in the second, third and fourth Mujib ministries. Abdullah's mother Sheikh Amena Begum belonged to the Sheikh family of Tungipara and was the sister of Sheikh Mujibur Rahman.

Abdullah's father, siblings, cousin and nephew were killed during the assassination of Sheikh Mujibur Rahman, whilst he was injured alongside his mother, sister-in-law and other siblings. His elder brother, Abul Hasnat Abdullah, is also a politician.

== Career ==
Khair Abdullah was nominated by Awami League to contest the Barisal City Corporation in 2023. Abdullah received 87,752 votes while his nearest rival, Islami Andolan Bangladesh's candidate Mufti Syed Mohammad Faizul Karim received 34,345.
