= Serniabat Sadiq Abdullah =

Bangladeshi politician

- সেরনিয়াবাত সাদিক আবদুল্লাহ
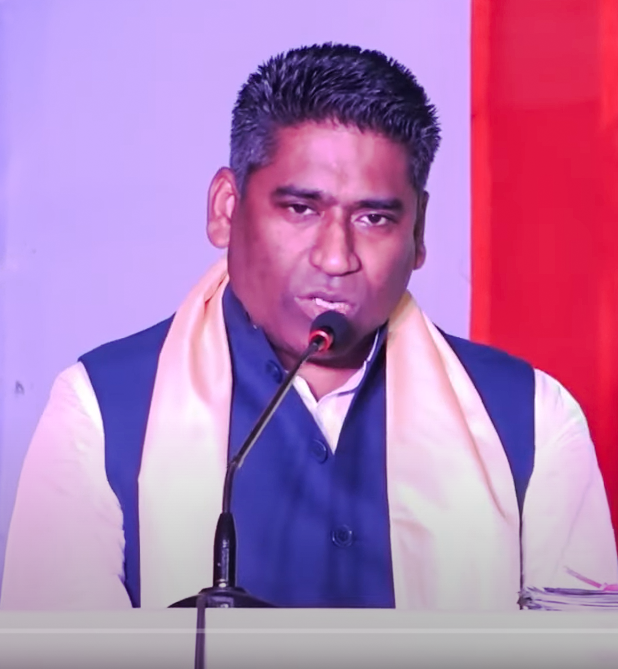

5th Mayor of Barisal
- In office 13 November 2018 – 9 November 2023
- Preceded by: Ahsan Habib Kamal
- Succeeded by: Abul Khair Abdullah

Personal details
- Born: 19 November 1974 (age 51) Barisal, Bangladesh
- Party: Bangladesh Awami League
- Spouse: Lipi Abdullah
- Relations: Abdur Rab Serniabat (grandfather)
- Parents: Abul Hasanat Abdullah (father); Sahan Ara Abdullah (mother)
- Relatives: See Sheikh–Wazed family
- Known for: Politician, businessman

Serniabat Sadiq Abdullah is a Bangladeshi politician and businessman. He served as mayor of the Barisal City Corporation from 2018 to 2023. He is a son of Awami League politician Abul Hasanat Abdullah and grandson of Abdur Rab Serniabat.

== Early life and education ==
Abdullah was born on 19 November 1974 to the Bengali Muslim Serniabat family of Seral in Agailjhara, Barisal District, Bangladesh. The family were direct descendants of Emperor Sher Shah Suri. His grandfather, Abdur Rab Serniabat, was a former minister in the second, third and fourth Mujib ministries. Abdullah's grandmother Sheikh Amena Begum belonged to the Sheikh family of Tungipara and was the sister of Sheikh Mujibur Rahman.

Abdullah's grandfather, uncle, aunt and cousin were killed during the assassination of Sheikh Mujibur Rahman, whilst his mother Shahan Ara Abdullah, and other relatives were injured. His uncle, Abul Khair Abdullah, is also a politician.

== Career ==
Abdullah was nominated by Awami League to contest the Barisal City Corporation in 2018. He was the joint secretary of Barisal City unit of Awami League. He skipped a meeting with voters organized by Citizens for Good Governance (SHUJAN).

Abdullah received 107,353 votes while his nearest rival, Mazibor Rahman Sarwar of Bangladesh Nationalist Party, received 13,135 votes. The election was boycotted by the candidates of Communist Party of Bangladesh and Islami Andolon Bangladesh who alleged vote rigging. He was sworn in by Prime Minister Sheikh Hasina. Before the elections, hundreds of Bangladesh Nationalist Party activists were detained.

Abdullah was appointed General Secretary of Barisal City unit of Awami League.

Three journalists of Barishal Khobor, an online portal, were detained by Bangladesh Police after they took a video of Abdullah and his family on a walk. They were beaten in custody, according to locals, and charged under the Digital Security Act on 14 September 2020.

Following the fall of the Sheikh Hasina led Awami League government, Abdullah's home in Barisal was burned down and destroyed with bulldozers in February 2025.
