= Agailjhara Upazila =

Agailjhara আগৈলঝাড়া
- Upazila
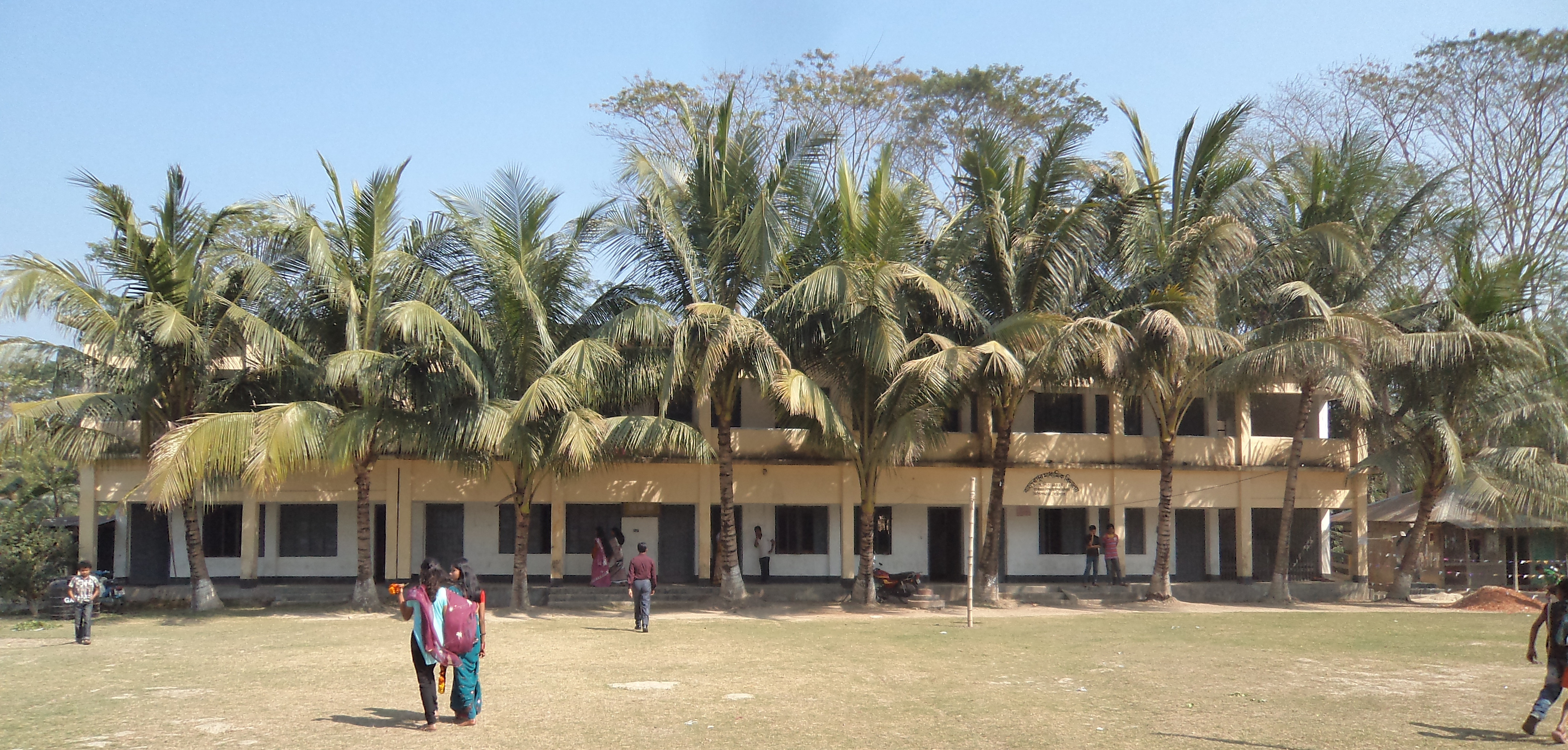
- Bahadurpur High School, Agailjhara

- Coordinates: 22°58′N 90°9′E
- Country: Bangladesh
- Division: Barisal Division
- District: Barisal District

Government
  - MP (Barisal-1): Abul Hasanat Abdullah

Area
  - Total: 161.82 km^{2} (62.48 sq mi)

Population (2022)
  - Total: 156,423
  - Density: 966.65/km^{2} (2,503.6/sq mi)
- Time zone: UTC+6 (BST)
- Postal code: 8240
- Area code: 04323
- Website: agailjhara.barisal.gov.bd

Agailjhara (Bengali: আগৈলঝাড়া) is an upazila (sub-district) of southern Bangladesh's Barisal District, part of the Barisal Division.

== Geography ==
Agailjhara Upazila covers 155.47 km^{2}. It is located between 22°54' and 23°03' north and between 90°03' and 90°13' east. It is bordered by Gournadi Upazila to the northeast, Wazirpur Upazila to the south, and Kotalipara Upazila of Gopalganj district to the west.

== History ==
Agailjhara was formerly part of Gournadi Upazila. In the 16th century, the Faujdar of Bakla Sabi Khan settled in the village of Gaila with members of the Mughal Army. The village of Seral was settled by Firoz Khan, a descendant of Sher Shah Suri, who lost to the Mughals. In 1921, a historic farmers convention was held in Agailjhara High English School presided by Khan Bahadur Hasem Ali Khan and advised by A. K. Fazlul Huq. During the Bangladesh Liberation War of 1971, 8 people were murdered in the village of Kodaldhoa. A thana (police station headquarters) was formed in Agailjhara on 16 June 1981. The status of Agailjhara Thana was upgraded to upazila (sub-district) on 7 November 1983 as part of the President of Bangladesh Hussain Muhammad Ershad's decentralisation programme.

== Demographics ==
According to the 2022 Bangladeshi census, Agailjhara Upazila had 38,310 households and a population of 156,423. 8.19% of the population were under 5 years of age. Agailjhara had a literacy rate (age 7 and over) of 82.10%: 84.84% for males and 79.54% for females, and a sex ratio of 94.84 males for every 100 females. 31,906 (20.40%) lived in urban areas.

As of the 2011 Census of Bangladesh, Agailijhara upazila has a population of 149,456 living in 32,839 households. Agailijhara has an average literacy rate of 56.67% (7+ years) and a sex ratio of 1064 females per 1000 males. 10,857 (7.26%) of the population lives in urban areas.

According to the 1991 Bangladesh census, Agailjhara had a population of 147,343 distributed among 30,560 households. 50.93% of the population was male, and 49.07% was female. There were 76,524 people aged 18 or over. Agailjhara had an average literacy rate of 42.4% (7+ years schooling), compared to the national average of 32.4%.

In the 2001 Bangladesh census, Agailjhara had a total population of 155,661 whereby males accounted for 50.23% (78,193) of the community, while 49.76% (77,468) were women.

=== Religion ===
Religions in Agailijhara Upazila (2022)
Religion	Percent
Islam	57.39%
Hinduism	40.47%
Christianity	2.12%

Population by religion in Union
Union	Muslim	Hindu	Others
Bagdha Union	21,099	9,254	1,295
Bakal Union	12,172	14,570	417
Gaila Union	23,368	9,408	1,153
Rajihar Union	14,972	16,579	291
Ratnapur Union	18,154	13,499	86

🟩 Muslim majority 🟧 Hindu majority

Islam is the predominant religion with 82,720 people identifying as Muslims, 63,175 as Hindus, 3,553 as Christians and 8 people worshipping other faiths. Agailjhara Upazila has the highest percentage share of Hindus among the 10 upazilas of Barisal district but both the absolute numbers and the share of population has decreased since 1981.

== Administration ==
UNO: Fariha Tanzin.

Agailjhara formed as a thana on 16 June 1981 and became an upazila on 7 November 1983.

Agailjhara Upazila is divided into five union parishads: Bagdha, Bakal, Gaila, Rajiher, and Ratnapur. The union parishads are subdivided into 78 mauzas and 96 villages.

== Education ==
Agailjhara is home to many notable schools, including Shaheed Abdur Rob Serniabat Degree College, Askar Kalibari Secondary School and College (established in 1943), Goila High School (1893), and Agailjhara B. H. P. Academy (1919).

=== Secondary schools ===
List of secondary schools in Agailjhara Upazila:

- Agailjhara Bhegai Halder Public Academy
- Agailjhara Sreemalati Matree Mangal Girls High School
- Askar Kalibari Secondary School & College
- Bagdha Secondary School and College
- Bahadurpur High School
- Bakal Niranjan Bairagi High School
- Barapaika Secondary School
- Basail Secondary School
- Batra Premchand Girls High School
- Chhoygram Secondary School
- Dumuria Secondary school
- Goila secondary School
- Jamina Mohammed Secondary School
- Jobarpar Secondary School
- Kagasura Secondary School
- Kathira Adarsha Biddya Niketon
- Kodaldhoa Secondary School
- Mollapara High School
- Naghirpar Secondary School
- Paisa High School
- Rajihar Secondary School
- Ramananderak High School
- Rangta Secondary School
- Ratnopur Secondary School
- Sheral Ml. High School
- Temar Maleka Khatun Girls High School
- Ulania Coronation High School
- Adarsha High School & College
- Valukshi High School

== Notable people ==
- Vijay Gupta, 15th-century Bengali poet
- Sabih Khan, 17th-century Faujdar of Bakla
- Serniabat family
  - Abdur Rab Serniabat (1921–1975), three-time minister and lawyer
  - Abul Hasanat Abdullah (born 1944), parliamentarian
  - Abul Khair Abdullah, 5th mayor of Barisal
  - Serniabat Sadiq Abdullah (born 1974), 4th mayor of Barisal

== See also ==
- Upazilas of Bangladesh
- Districts of Bangladesh
- Divisions of Bangladesh
- Kodaldhoa
