= Zaker Party =

Zaker Party জাকের পার্টি
- Abbreviation: ZKP
- Chairperson: Mostofa Ameer Faisal Mujaddedi
- Secretary-General: Shamim Haydar
- Founder: Hasmat Ullah
- Founded: 14 October 1989; 36 years ago
- Student wing: Zaker Party Chattra Front; Zaker Party Chattri Front
- Youth wing: Zaker Party Jubo Front; Zaker Party Kishore Front
- Women's wing: Zaker Party Mahila Front; Zaker Party Jubo Mahila Front
- Labour wing: Zaker Party Labour Front
- Volunteer wing: Zaker Party Swecchaswebak Front; Zaker Party Youth Volunteer Front
- Clergy wing: Zaker Party Ulama Front; Zaker Party Jubo Ulama Front; Zaker Party Talaba Front
- Non-Muslim & loyalist wing: Zaker Party Hindu Front; Zaker Party Christian Front; Zaker Party Bhakta Front
- Ideology: Sufism
- Political position: Centre
- Jatiya Sangsad: 0 / 350

Election symbol
- Rose

Website
- zakerpartybd.com

Zaker Party (Bengali: জাকের পার্টি) is a Sufi political party in Bangladesh. The party advocates for policies aligning with Sufism. It also advocates for the use of blockchain technology and e-voting for elections, which it believes can ensure a free and fair election.

== History ==
The Zaker Party was officially established in 1989. Before this, on 10 September 1987, the organization was started with the name, "Zaker." The then Piir Hasmat Ullah of Atarshi led and unveiled the formation of this party on 14 October 1989.

=== Current National Standing Committee ===
- Mostofa Amir Faisal
- Sayem Amir Faisal
- Shamim Haydar
- Shariful Islam
- Masum Billah
- Robiul Islam Robi

== Ideology ==
The Zaker Party has called for the use for blockchain technology and e-voting as a means of ensuring free and fair elections.

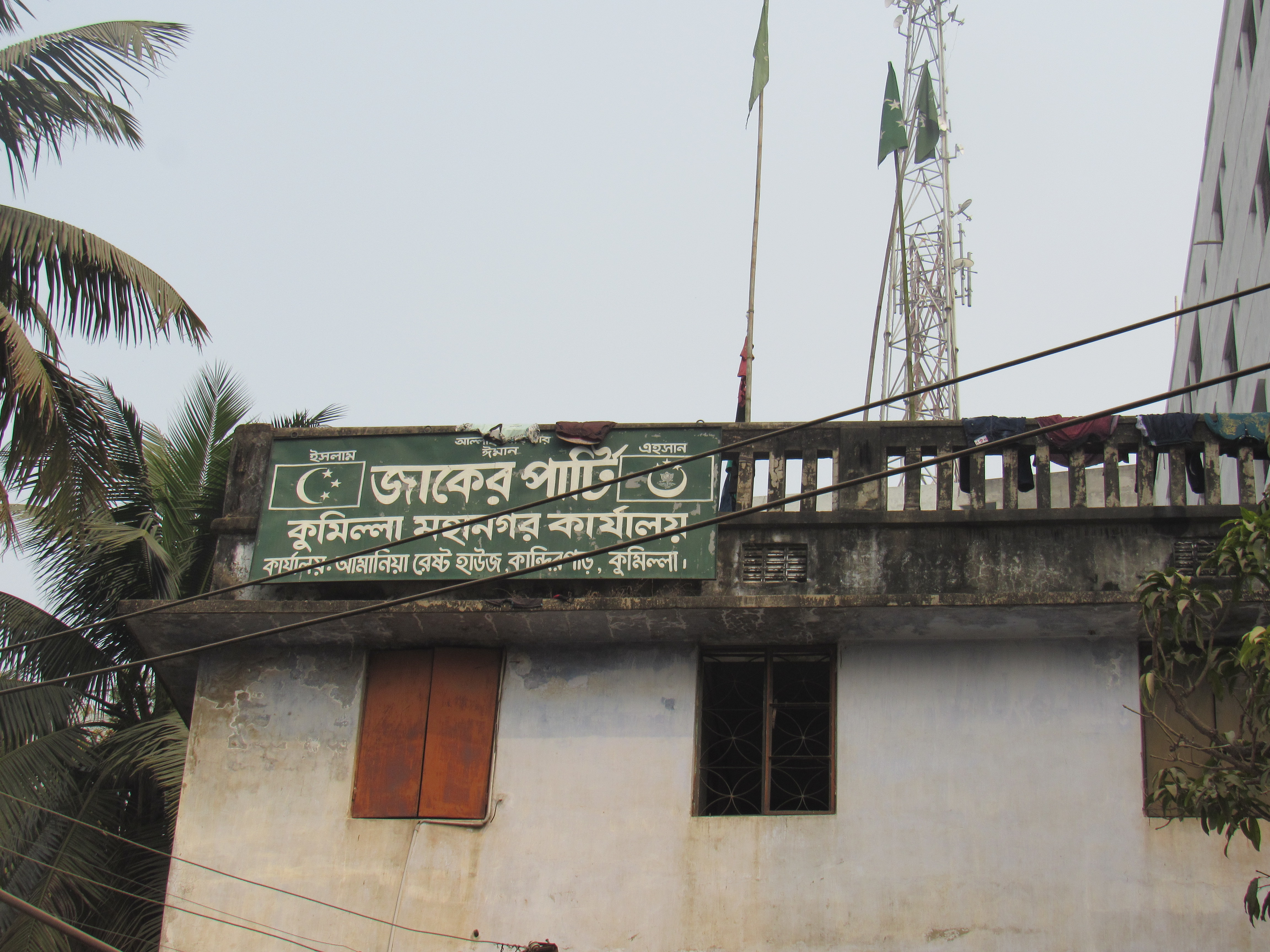
Zaker Party's office in Comilla

The party has also strongly emphasized on "law and order" and modernizing law enforcement agencies. It also calls for the introduction of a National Health Insurance scheme, abolishing capital punishment, improving third gender rights, ensuring all political parties get representation in parliament, introduction of referendums in important issues, allowing start-ups to run tax-free for the first three years, ensuring free portable water to all citizens and more.

== Election history ==
The following table shows the election history of the Zaker Party.

Election	Leader	Votes	%	+/-
1991	Mostafa Amir Faisal	417,737	1.22	
1996 Feb	Mostafa Amir Faisal	Boycotted		▼1.22
1996 Jun	Mostafa Amir Faisal	167,597	0.40	▲0.40
2001	Mostafa Amir Faisal	1,181	0.00	▼0.40
2008	Mostafa Amir Faisal	134,933	0.19	▲0.19
2014	Mostafa Amir Faisal	Boycotted		▼0.19
2018	Mostafa Amir Faisal	109,440	0.13	▲0.13
2024	Mostafa Amir Faisal	94,332	0.27	▲0.14

== See also ==
- Bangladesh Jamaat-e-Islami
- Bangladesh Awami League
- Bangladesh Nationalist Party
- Bangladesh Congress
