= Khulna City Corporation =

Local governing body of Bangladesh

Coordinates: 22.8166°N 89.5661°E

Khulna City Corporation খুলনা সিটি কর্পোরেশন
- Emblem of the Khulna City Corporation

Type
- Type: City Corporation

History
- Founded: 12 December 1984; 41 years ago
- New session started: 19 August 2024

Leadership
- Mayor: Vacant since 19 August 2024
- Administrator: Nazrul Islam Manju, BNP since 01 March 2026
- Deputy Mayor: Vacant since 19 August 2024
- Chief Executive Officer: Rajib Ahmed since 13 January 2026

Structure
- Seats: Vacant seats 41 councillors
- Length of term: Up to five years

Elections
- Voting system: First past the post
- First election: 22 May 1991
- Last election: 12 June 2023
- Next election: TBD

Meeting place
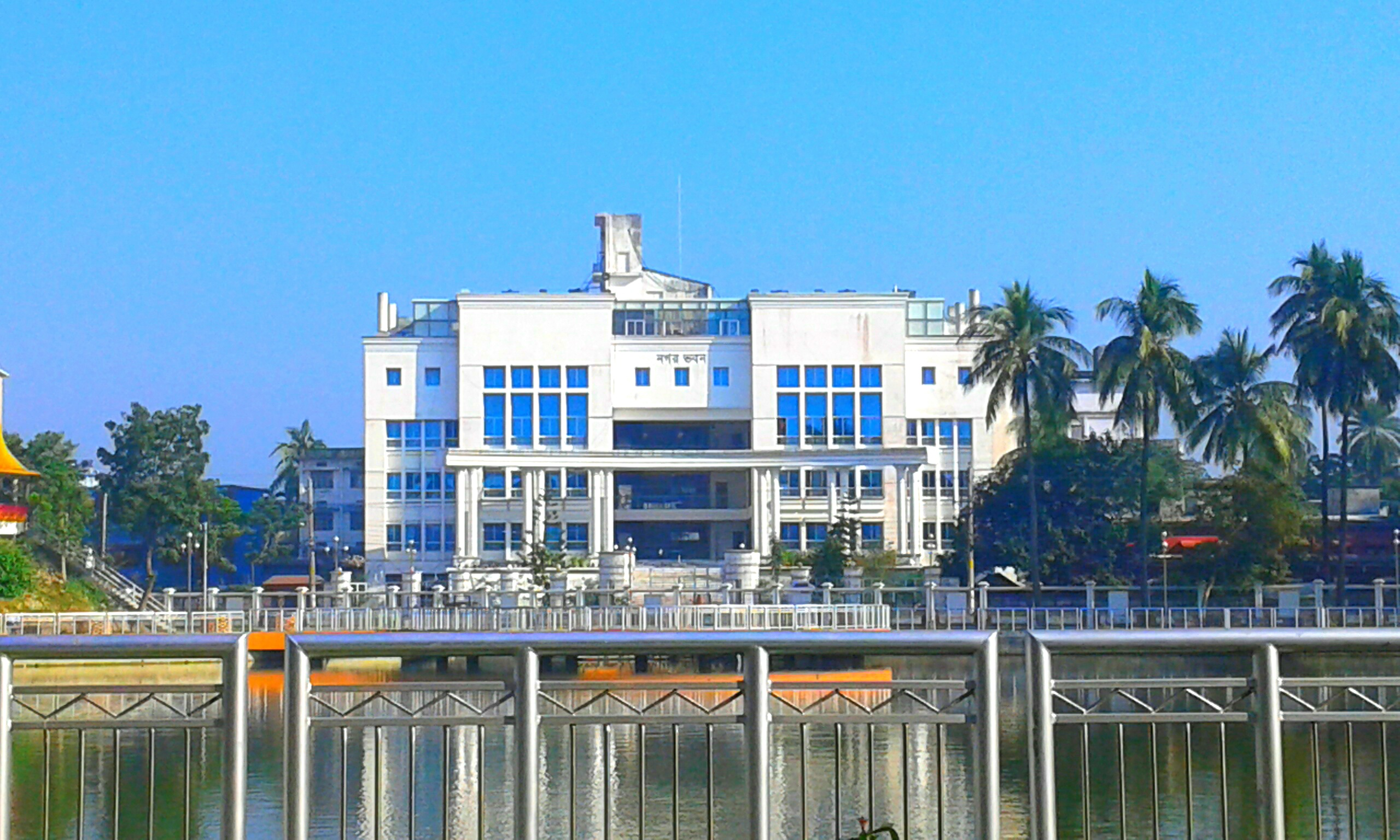
- Nagar Bhaban, Khulna

Website
- khulnacity.gov.bd

Khulna City Corporation (Bengali: খুলনা সিটি কর্পোরেশন - in short: KCC), is a local government authority responsible for administering all civic services in the Khulna, the city of Bangladesh. The KCC government is elected by popular vote every five years. The corporation is headed by a mayor, who oversees a council consisting of 41 councillors representing different wards of the city. The functions and powers of the KCC are defined under the provisions of the City Corporation Act, 2009.

Khulna Municipality, established in 1884, is one of the major divisional city corporations of Bangladesh. Before its establishment as city corporation, it was a municipal corporation in 1984. Basically, Khulna City Corporation is a formation under the local government administration of Bangladesh to regulate the city area of Khulna, which is under the Ministry of Local Government & Rural Development (LGRD). Generally under local government, an election is held to elect a mayor of Khluna City Corporation. This election is held in every 5 years. Khulna City Corporation is self-governing organizations, which runs on its own. To take care of legal issues of this corporation, Metropolitan Magistrate Court (CMM court) is there.

== History ==
For the first time, Khulna was declared as a Municipality by The Calcutta Gazettee on 8 September 1884. Gagan Chandra Dutta was the first chairman of the Khulna Municipality Board. That time Khulna municipality was consisted with Tootpara, Sheikhpara, Charabati, Helatala and Koyla ghat area.

After Independence of Bangladesh, the Municipality renamed as Khulna Pouroshava by Bangladesh Local Council and Municipal Committee (desolation and administration arrangement) order - 1972.

In 1984, Khulna Municipality updated to Khulna Municipal Corporation on the 100th anniversary of the township by the president Hussein Muhammad Ershad.

== Wards & Area ==
Khulna City Corporation consists with 31 wards. The area of the city corporation is 45.65 square Kilometers.

Wards of KCC
Ward No.	Area	Police Station
01	Banikpara, Maniktala, North Raily Gate	Daulatpur
02	Senpara, Mirerdaga	Daulatpur, Khan Jahan Ali
03	Kartikkul, Kalibari, Madhyadanga	Daulatpur, Aranghata
04	Deana	Daulatpur
05	Daulatpur Bazar	Daulatpur
06	Pabla	Daulatpur
07	North Kashipur	Khalishpur
08	The Peoples Jute Mills, The Crescent Jute Mills	Khalishpur
09	Mujgunni, Goalkhali, North Rayer Mahal	Khalishpur
10	Nayabati, Khalishpur Housing North, West, North West Block	Khalishpur
11	Khalishpur Housing East Block	Khalishpur
12	Khalishpur Housing South Block	Khalishpur
13	Platinum Jute Mills, Daulatpur Jute Mills, Hardboard Mills, Newsprint Mills, Charerhat	Khalishpur
14	East Boyra, Boyra, Rayer Mahal Bazar	Khalishpur, Aranghata
15	Polytechnic, Port Colony, Joragate	Khalishpur
16	C&B Colony, Noor Nagar, Boyra Bazar, Andirghat, Rayer Mahal Sluice Gate	Sonadanga, Aranghata
17	New Market, Textile Mills, KMC, Pujakhola, Hasanbagh, Sonadanga R/A	Sonadanga
18	Shibbari, Sonadanga, Denarabad, West Gallamari	Sonadanga
19	Goborchaka, Moylapota	Sonadanga
20	Sheikhpara	Sonadanga
21	BIWTA Ghat, Boro Bazar, Hadis Park, Jail Khana Ghat	Sadar
22	Custom Ghat, Koyla Ghat	Sadar
23	Baitipara, Mirzapur	Sadar
24	Iqbal Nagar, Musalmanpara, Nirala, South Gallamari	Sadar
25	Basupara, Banargati, North Gallamari	Sonadanga
26	West Baniakhamar	Sonadanga
27	East Baniakhamar	Sadar
28	West Tootpara, Miapara, Karpara	Sadar
29	Haji Mohsin Road, South Central Road, TB Cross Road, Gagan Babu Road	Sadar
30	Tootpara, Motiakhali	Sadar
31	Labanchara	Labanchara

== Population ==
The population of the city corporation as per 2022 census is 718,735. It is the third largest city corporation of Bangladesh in terms of total population.

== Functions and Services ==
The Khulna City Corporation (KCC) is responsible for administering the city and ensuring the provision of essential infrastructure and public services. Its functions include urban planning, transport management, healthcare, education, waste management, water supply, and security. Through these services, KCC aims to improve the quality of life for residents and promote sustainable urban development.

Departments of Khulna City Corporation
#	Departments	Functions / Services
1	Office of the Mayor	Executive administration; city governance; supervision of all KCC services
2	Chief Executive Office	Departmental coordination; service implementation monitoring
3	Administration and Establishment	HR management; staff recruitment; service delivery monitoring
4	Finance and Accounts	Budget preparation; financial planning; payment processing; accounts management; internal audit
5	Engineering	Road-cutting permission; building design approval; contractor registration; land demarcation certificates
6	Urban Planning and Development	Road, drain, bridge, culvert and footpath development; land development; planned residential areas; city beautification
7	Electricity	Installation and maintenance of street lights; lamp-post management; city illumination
8	Transportation and Communication	Urban transport management; traffic & parking control; emergency transport; corpse handling; bus terminal management; road roller & ambulance services
9	Waste Management and Cleaning	Solid waste collection and disposal; street cleaning; drain clearing; mosquito control; landfill management
10	Health	Hospital & clinic management; maternal & child immunization; vitamin A campaigns; midwifery and health technology training
11	Registrar	Birth & death certificates; nationality, inheritance & character certificates
12	Education	Management of schools, madrasas, Sanskrit tolls, kindergartens, technical institutes; adult education; teacher training; cultural & theatre institutes
13	Water Supply and Sewerage	Water supply coordination; sewerage management under Khulna WASA
14	Revenue	Trade license issuance & renewal; holding tax collection; shop/market allotment; lease and asset management
15	Security and Law and Order	City security; joint operations with KMP; CCTV installation and monitoring
16	Magistracy	Arbitration-based case settlement; mobile courts; anti-adulteration drives
17	Housing and Public Works	Distribution and maintenance of residential plots and flats
18	Cultural and Social Development	National Day celebrations; charity programs; and children’s park and playground construction & maintenance
19	Environmental Protection	Pollution control; climate change mitigation; urban greening; tree plantation
20	Religious Welfare	Support for Eid, Puja, and religious events; Qurbani market permissions; land allocation for religious events

== Annual Budget ==
Khulna City Corporation (KCC) has announced a budget of ৳719.50 crore (US$59 million) for 2025-2026 fiscal year.

== Ward and councillor list ==
Khulna City Corporation is administratively divided into 31 wards. Each ward is represented by one elected councillor, while additional reserved women councillors are elected for groups of wards, as provided under the Local Government (City Corporation) Act.

=== Councillors of Khulna City Corporation ===
Ward	Locations Covered	Councillor	Party	
Ward-1	Banikpara, Maniktala, North Raily Gate	Vacant	TBD	
Ward-2	Senpara, Mirerdaga	Vacant	TBD	
Ward-3	Kartikkul, Kalibari, Madhyadanga	Vacant	TBD	
Ward-4	Deana	Vacant	TBD	
Ward-5	Daulatpur Bazar	Vacant	TBD	
Ward-6	Pabla	Vacant	TBD	
Ward-7	North Kashipur	Vacant	TBD	
Ward-8	The Peoples Jute Mills, The Crescent Jute Mills	Vacant	TBD	
Ward-9	Mujgunni, Goalkhali, North Rayer Mahal	Vacant	TBD	
Ward-10	Nayabati, Khalishpur Housing (North, West, North-West Block)	Vacant	TBD	
Ward-11	Khalishpur Housing (East Block)	Vacant	TBD	
Ward-12	Khalishpur Housing (South Block)	Vacant	TBD	
Ward-13	Platinum Jute Mills, Daulatpur Jute Mills, Hardboard Mills, Newsprint Mills, Charerhat	Vacant	TBD	
Ward-14	East Boyra, Boyra, Rayer Mahal Bazar	Vacant	TBD	
Ward-15	Polytechnic, Port Colony, Joragate	Vacant	TBD	
Ward-16	C&B Colony, Noor Nagar, Boyra Bazar, Andirghat, Rayer Mahal Sluice Gate	Vacant	TBD	
Ward-17	New Market, Textile Mills, KMC, Pujakhola, Hasanbagh, Sonadanga R/A	Vacant	TBD	
Ward-18	Shibbari, Sonadanga, Denarabad, West Gallamari	Vacant	TBD	
Ward-19	Goborchaka, Moylapota	Vacant	TBD	
Ward-20	Sheikhpara	Vacant	TBD	
Ward-21	BIWTA Ghat, Boro Bazar, Hadis Park, Jail Khana Ghat	Vacant	TBD	
Ward-22	Custom Ghat, Koyla Ghat	Vacant	TBD	
Ward-23	Baitipara, Mirzapur	Vacant	TBD	
Ward-24	Iqbal Nagar, Musalmanpara, Nirala, South Gallamari	Vacant	TBD	
Ward-25	Basupara, Banargati, North Gallamari	Vacant	TBD	
Ward-26	West Baniakhamar	Vacant	TBD	
Ward-27	East Baniakhamar	Vacant	TBD	
Ward-28	West Tootpara, Miapara, Karpara	Vacant	TBD	
Ward-29	Haji Mohsin Road, South Central Road, TB Cross Road, Gagan Babu Road	Vacant	TBD	
Ward-30	Tootpara, Motiakhali	Vacant	TBD	
Ward-31	Labanchara	Vacant	TBD	
	Reserved women's seats			
32	Women's seat-1		Vacant	TBD
33	Women's seat-2		Vacant	TBD
34	Women's seat-3		Vacant	TBD
35	Women's seat-4		Vacant	TBD
36	Women's seat-5		Vacant	TBD
37	Women's seat-6		Vacant	TBD
38	Women's seat-7		Vacant	TBD
39	Women's seat-8		Vacant	TBD
40	Women's seat-9		Vacant	TBD
41	Women's seat-10		Vacant	TBD

== Past elections ==
=== Election Result 2023 ===
Khulna Mayoral Election 2023
Party	Candidate	Votes	%	±%
AL	Talukder Abdul Khaleque	154,825	60.41	−7.88
IAB	Abdul Awal	60,064	23.44	+17.83
JP(E)	Shafiqul Islam Madhu	18,074	7.05	+3.99
Independent	SM Shafiqur Rahman	17,218	6.72	+6.21
Zaker Party	SM Sabbir Hossain	6,096	2.38	+2.38
Majority		94,761	36.97	−25.71
Turnout		256,433	47.88	−4.07
Registered electors		535,528		
AL hold				

=== Election Result 2018 ===
Khulna Mayoral Election 2018
Party	Candidate	Votes	%	±%
AL	Talukder Abdul Khaleque	174,851	58.87	+22.95
BNP	Nazrul Islam Manju	109,251	36.78	−17.37
IAB	Muzammil Haque	14,363	4.84	+4.84
JP(E)	SM Shafiqur Rahman Mushfiq	1,072	0.36	+0.36
CPB	Mizanur Rahman Babu	534	0.18	+0.18
Majority		65,600	22.09	+3.86
Turnout		300,071	60.85	−2.25
Registered electors		493,093		
AL gain from BNP				

=== Election Result 2013 ===
Khulna Mayoral Election 2013
Party	Candidate	Votes	%	±%
BNP	Md. Moniruzzaman Moni	180,093	54.17	+8.61
AL	Talukder Abdul Khaleque	119,422	35.92	−18.52
Majority		60,671	18.25	+9.41
Turnout		332,450	75.45	+13.45
Registered electors		440,566		
BNP gain from AL				

=== Election Result 2008 ===
Khulna Mayoral Election 2008
Party	Candidate	Votes	%	±%
AL	Talukder Abdul Khaleque	118,829	54.44	New
BNP	Md. Moniruzzaman Moni	99,556	45.56	New
Majority		19,273	8.84	New
Turnout		218,385	62.00	New
Registered electors		352,450		
AL gain from BNP				

== List of chairman ==
- Gagan Chandra Dutta (1884)
- Roy Bahadur Mahendra Kumar Ghosh (1928-1948)

== List of mayors ==
Political parties

- Bangladesh Awami League
- Bangladesh Nationalist Party

Other factions

Independent

Status

Acting Mayor and Administrator

No.	Portrait	Officeholder (birth–death)	Election	Term of office			Designation	Political party	Reference
No.	Portrait	Officeholder (birth–death)	Election	From	To	Period	Designation	Political party	Reference
–		Kazi Aminul Haque	—	9 August 1988	9 December 1990	2 years, 77 days	Administrator	Independent	
–		A. K. M. Fazlul Haque Miah	—	15 December 1990	22 May 1991	158 days	Divisional Commissioner & Administrator	Independent	
1		Sheikh Tayebur Rahman; (1936–2016)	1994; 2002	22 May 1991	29 November 2007	16 years, 191 days	Mayor	Bangladesh Nationalist Party	
2		Md. Moniruzzaman Moni	–	20 November 2007	15 September 2008	300 days	Mayor	Bangladesh Nationalist Party	
3		Talukder Abdul Khaleque	2008	14 September 2008	9 June 2013	4 years, 268 days	Mayor	Bangladesh Awami League	
–		Azmal Ahmed	—	30 June 2013	23 September 2013	85 days	Acting Mayor	Bangladesh Awami League	
4		Md. Moniruzzaman Moni	2013	23 September 2013	2 November 2015	2 years, 40 days	Mayor	Bangladesh Nationalist Party	
–		Anisur Rahman Biswas	—	3 November 2015	20 November 2016	1 year, 17 days	Acting Mayor	Bangladesh Nationalist Party	
4		Md. Moniruzzaman Moni	—	21 November 2016	19 May 2018	1 year, 179 days	Mayor	Bangladesh Nationalist Party	
5		Talukder Abdul Khaleque	2018; 2023	20 May 2018	19 August 2024	6 years, 91 days	Mayor	Bangladesh Awami League	
–		Md. Helal Mahmud Sharif	–	19 August 2024	8 December 2025	111 days	Divisional Commissioner & Administrator	Independent	
–		Md. Firoz Sarker	–	8 December 2024	14 October 2025	310 days	Divisional Commissioner & Administrator	Independent	
–		Md. Firoz Shah	–	14 October 2025	18 November 2025	35 days	Divisional Commissioner (Acting) & Administrator (Acting)	Independent	
–		Md. Mokhtar Ahmed	–	18 November 2025	28 February 2026	102 days	Divisional Commissioner & Administrator	Independent	
–		Nazrul Islam Manju	–	1 March 2026	Present	104 days	Administrator	Bangladesh Nationalist Party	

== See also ==
- Khulna Development Authority
- Khulna Metropolitan Police
