= Khulna Metropolitan Police =

Police in Khulna, Bangladesh

Khulna Metropolitan Police খুলনা মেট্রোপলিটন পুলিশ
- Crest of Khulna Metropolitan Police
- Abbreviation: KMP

Agency overview
- Formed: 1 July 1986

Jurisdictional structure
- Operations jurisdiction: Khulna, Bangladesh
- Area: 91.351 km^{2} (35.271 sq mi)
- Population: 718,735 (2022)
- Constituting instrument: The Khulna Metropolitan Police Ordinance, 1985
- General nature: Local civilian police

Operational structure
- Headquarters: KMP Headquarter, 189 Khan Jahan Ali Road, Khulna
- Minister responsible: Salahuddin Ahmed, Minister of Home Affairs
- Agency executive: DIG Md. Zulfikar Ali Haider, BPM (Bar), Police Commissioner
- Parent agency: Bangladesh Police
- Special Units: Detective Branch; City Special Branch

Facilities
- Stations: 8
- Armored vehicles: Otokar Cobra, IAG Guardian
- Helicopters: Bell 407

Website
- kmp.police.gov.bd
- Service uniform: Yankees Blue, Light French Beige Combat uniform: Oak Brown, Brown Derby

The Khulna Metropolitan Police (Bengali: খুলনা মেট্রোপলিটন পুলিশ, romanized: Khulnā mēṭrōpaliṭana puliśa; abbreviated as KMP) is the primary metropolitan unit of the Bangladesh Police, responsible for law enforcement, public safety, and crime prevention within the metropolis of Khulna, a major city in southwestern Bangladesh. Established in 1986 under the Khulna Metropolitan Police Ordinance, KMP oversees policing operations, administration, and coordination with other law enforcement and emergency agencies in the city. The force is headed by a Police Commissioner who manages all operational and administrative functions.

== History ==
The Khulna Metropolitan Police was established on 1 July 1986 by the Khulna Metropolitan Police Ordinance, 1985.

Crimes increased in 2003 after the removal of joint forces following the end of Operation Clean Heart.

On 26 June 2004, a constable of the Khulna Metropolitan Police was injured at a bomb attack at Arya Dharmasava Temple during Ratha Jatra festival.

The Khulna Metropolitan Police provided protection for Mizanur Rahman Mizan, general secretary of the Awami League Khulna city unit, and Ajmol Ahmed Tapan, panel mayor of Khulna following the assassination of a councilor of Khulna.

The Khulna Metropolitan Police announced plans to establish a wanted list on their website in February 2010. In May 2011, the Bangladesh High Court warned two police officers of the Khulna Metropolitan Police over beating and electrocuting a nine year during interrogation after he was detained in suspicion of theft.

In April 2012, the officer in charge of Khulna Sadar Police Station, SM Kamruzzaman, and three constables were suspended after a photo emerged of them torturing two activists of the Bangladesh Jatiotabadi Chatradal, the student front of the Bangladesh Nationalist Party, ahead of a strike. The students were from Brajalal College and Azam Khan Government Commerce College.

The Khulna Metropolitan Police arrested Khulna City Corporation mayor and Bangladesh Nationalist Party politician Moniruzzaman Moni on charges of attacking police and vandalizing their vehicle. Following his arrest, Moni was suspended from the post of mayor by the Minister of Local Government, Rural Development and Cooperatives.

In May 2018, Bangladesh Nationalist Party called for the removal of the commissioner of the Khulna Metropolitan Police ahead of the national elections to ensure fair poling. A report by the Prime Minister's Office found involvement of police officers and Awami League politicians in drug dealing in Khulna. Khulna Metropolitan Police Commissioner Humayun Kabir was withdrawn by the Election Commission following a complaint of the Jatiya Okiya Front in November.

In April 2019, the Khulna Metropolitan Police clashed with jute mill workers on strike in Khulna.

Police arrested two students of Khulna University for their involvement in bombing an office of the Bangladesh Krishak League and a police garage in January 2020. They were linked with neo-Jama'at Mujahideen Bangladesh and their attacks were claimed by the Islamic State according to the SITE Intelligence Group. The Khulna Metropolitan Police purchased four sedans and two microbuses to expand their vehicle pool in July. The officer in charge of Khulna Sadar Police Station, Aslam Bahar Bulbul, was suspended over negligence of duty following the murder of Dr Abdur Rakib Khan at the hands of family members of a patient.

In October 2022, the Khulna Metropolitan Police detained Bangladesh Nationalist Party activists before a grand rally of the party. The police action in coordination with a transport strike was designed to hinder the rally of the party.

== Stations ==
The Khulna Metropolitan Police (KMP) has 8 police stations called thanas for 31 Wards of KCC and its surroundings.

Thanas of KMP
Thana Name	Division	Area Coverage	Establishment	Outposts & Camps Under KMP
Khulna Sadar	South	KCC Wards - 21, 22, 23, 24, 27, 28, 29 & 30.	1836	Khulna Sadar
Khulna Sadar	South	KCC Wards - 21, 22, 23, 24, 27, 28, 29 & 30.	1836	Rupsha
Khulna Sadar	South	KCC Wards - 21, 22, 23, 24, 27, 28, 29 & 30.	1836	Tootpara
Khulna Sadar	South	KCC Wards - 21, 22, 23, 24, 27, 28, 29 & 30.	1836	Nirala
Sonadanga	South	KCC Wards - 17, 18, 19, 20, 25, 26 & 16 (Partially)	1986	Choto Boyra
Sonadanga	South	KCC Wards - 17, 18, 19, 20, 25, 26 & 16 (Partially)	1986	Bania Khamar
Sonadanga	South	KCC Wards - 17, 18, 19, 20, 25, 26 & 16 (Partially)	1986	Jora Gate
Labanchara	South	KCC Wards - 31 & Parts of Jalma Union.	2013	Labanchara
Harintana	South	KCC Wards - 16 & Jalma Union (Partially) Gutudia Union (Partially)	2013	Khulna University
Khalishpur	North	KCC Wards - 7, 8, 10, 11, 12, 13, 15 & 9 (Partially), 14 (Partially)	1986	Boro Boyra
Khalishpur	North	KCC Wards - 7, 8, 10, 11, 12, 13, 15 & 9 (Partially), 14 (Partially)	1986	Khalishpur
Khalishpur	North	KCC Wards - 7, 8, 10, 11, 12, 13, 15 & 9 (Partially), 14 (Partially)	1986	Kalibari
Khalishpur	North	KCC Wards - 7, 8, 10, 11, 12, 13, 15 & 9 (Partially), 14 (Partially)	1986	Rayer Mahal
Daulatpur	North	KCC Wards - 4, 5, 6, & 1 (Partially), 2 (Partially), 3 (Partially)	1914	Trade School
Daulatpur	North	KCC Wards - 4, 5, 6, & 1 (Partially), 2 (Partially), 3 (Partially)	1914	Maheshwarpasha
Daulatpur	North	KCC Wards - 4, 5, 6, & 1 (Partially), 2 (Partially), 3 (Partially)	1914	Kartikkul
Khan Jahan Ali	North	KCC Wards - 2 (Partially) & Jogipol Union (Partially), Atra Gilatala Union (Partially)	1986	Phulbari Gate
Khan Jahan Ali	North	KCC Wards - 2 (Partially) & Jogipol Union (Partially), Atra Gilatala Union (Partially)	1986	Shiromoni
Khan Jahan Ali	North	KCC Wards - 2 (Partially) & Jogipol Union (Partially), Atra Gilatala Union (Partially)	1986	Atra
Khan Jahan Ali	North	KCC Wards - 2 (Partially) & Jogipol Union (Partially), Atra Gilatala Union (Partially)	1986	Pather Bazar
Aranghata	North	KCC Wards - 1 (Partially), 3 (Partially) & Aranghata Union, Atra Gilatala Union (Partially) & Rangpur Union (Partially)	2013	Aranghata
Aranghata	North	KCC Wards - 1 (Partially), 3 (Partially) & Aranghata Union, Atra Gilatala Union (Partially) & Rangpur Union (Partially)	2013	Rangpur

== See also ==
- Khulna City Corporation
- Khulna Development Authority
- Metropolitan Police (Bangladesh)
