= 2018 Khulna City Corporation election =

Mayoral election in Bangladesh

- 15 May 2018
- Registered: 493,093 (▲11.92 pp)
- Turnout: 60.85% (▼14.60 pp)
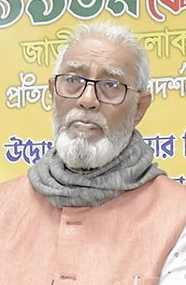

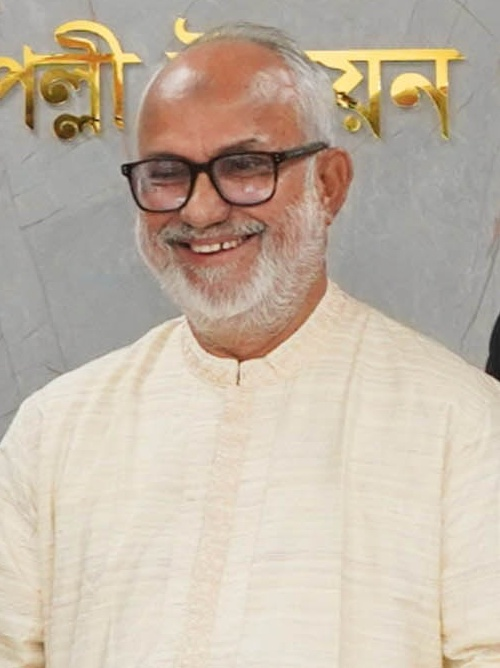
	First party	Second party
Candidate	Talukder Abdul Khaleque	Nazrul Islam Manju
Party	AL	BNP
Popular vote	174,851	109,251
Percentage	57.87%	32.11%
Swing	▲24.55pp	▼22.04pp
Mayor before election
Md. Moniruzzaman Moni
BNP
Elected Mayor
Talukder Abdul Khaleque
Awami League
- Council election
- 15 May 2018; 41 seats in the Khulna City Corporation
Party	Leader	Seats	+/–
AL	Talukder Abdul Khaleque	18	
BNP	Nazrul Islam Manju	9	
Independent	—	14	
This lists parties that won seats. See the complete results below.

The 2018 Khulna City Corporation election was a local government election in the city of Khulna, Bangladesh, held on 15 May 2018 to elect the Mayor of Khulna and the Khulna City Council. The election resulted in a victory for the Awami League candidate Talukder Abdul Khaleque, who was elected to a second term as mayor of the Khulna City Corporation.

== Schedule ==
The schedule of the election was announced by the Election Commission of Bangladesh on 31 March 2018.

Event	Date	Day
Date of notification	31 March 2018	
Last date for filing nominations	12 April 2018	
Date for scrutiny of nominations	15–16 April 2018	
Last date for withdrawal of candidatures	23 April 2018	
Symbols distribution		
Date of poll & counting	15 May 2018	

== Results ==
=== Mayoral election ===
Mayoral election results
Party	Candidate	Votes	%	±%
AL	Talukder Abdul Khaleque	174,851	58.87	+22.95
BNP	Nazrul Islam Manju	109,251	36.78	−17.37
IAB	Muzammil Haque	14,363	4.84	+4.84
JP(E)	SM Shafiqur Rahman Mushfiq	1,072	0.36	+0.36
CPB	Mizanur Rahman Babu	534	0.18	+0.18
Majority		65,600	22.09	+3.86
Turnout		300,071	60.85	−2.25
Registered electors		493,093		
AL gain from BNP				

=== Councillor election results ===
2023 Barishal council election results (party-wise)
Party	Seats		
Party	Ward Councilors	Reserved Women Councilors	Total Councilors
Bangladesh Awami League	12	6	18
Bangladesh Nationalist Party-BNP	9	—	9
Independent(s)	4	2	6
Awami rebel	4	—	4
BNP expelled	1	—	1
Postpone	1	2	3
Total	31	10	41
