= Sundarban Gas Company Limited =

Bangladeshi government-owned gas company

Sundarban Gas Company Limited (SGCL)
- Abbreviation: SGCL
- Formation: 2009
- Type: SOE
- Legal status: Active
- Purpose: Gas distribution
- Headquarters: 218, MA Bari Road, Sonadanga, Khulna, Bangladesh (Temporary) Jogipol, Phulbari Gate, Khulna (Permanent)
- Region served: Khulna Division, Barishal Division, some districts of Dhaka Division
- Official language: Bengali
- Parent organization: Petrobangla
- Website: sgcl.org.bd

Sundarban Gas Company Limited (SGCL) (Bengali: সুন্দরবন গ্যাস কোম্পানী লিমিটেড (এসজিসিএল)) is a Bangladesh government owned gas distribution company under Petrobangla responsible for distributing gas in the south-western region of Bangladesh.

== History ==
Sundarban Gas Company Limited was established on 23 November 2009 under Petrobangla. The company is responsible for gas supply in Barishal Division, Khulna Division, and the greater Faridpur region.

In August 2013, the Sundarban Gas Company Limited provided the first natural gas connection to a home in Bhola District.

On 31 January 2015, Sundarban Gas Distribution Company along with other state-owned gas distribution companies sought permission from Bangladesh Energy Regulatory Commission to double the tariff for gas supply to households. The company spent 3.5 billion BDT building pipelines in the country's southwestern region but the project could not be utilized due to the scarcity of natural gas in the region. The project was shut down in 2016. In 2017, the decision was taken to raise the tariff in two phases.

In March 2019, Sundarban Gas Distribution Company along with three other state owned distribution companies sought permission from Bangladesh Energy Regulatory Commission to increase the price of the gas they supplied. There was a hearing on the proposed hike and Gano Forum threatened street protests unless the price hike was cancelled.

Nasrul Hamid, the State Minister of the Ministry of Power, Energy and Mineral Resources told in parliament the outstanding bills of the Sundarban Gas Company Limited stood at 1.2 billion BDT in January 2021.

On 21 January 2022, Sundarban Gas Distribution Company along with other state owned distribution companies sought permission from Bangladesh Energy Regulatory Commission to double the tariff of household gas supply. The company, and other state owned gas companies, make a profit residential connections through the usage of a flat rate and discouraging metered connections.
