= Shahid Hadis Park =

Urban Park in Khulna, Bangladesh

- শহীদ হাদিস পার্ক হাদিস পার্ক
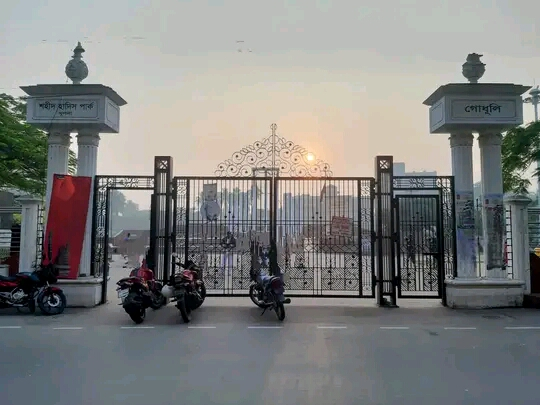
- Twilight Entrance of Shahid Hadis Park
- Interactive map of Shahid Hadis Park
- Type: Park
- Location: Prafulla Chandra Ray Road (P. C. Ray Road), Khulna Bangladesh
- Coordinates: 22.8158°N 89.5660°E
- Area: 5 acres (20,000 m^{2})
- Owner: Khulna City Corporation
- Administrator: Khulna City Corporation
- Open: 6 am to 10 pm (summer) 7 am to 8.30 pm (winter)
- Status: Open all year
- Water: Pounds
- Parking: Yes
- Public transit: Hadis Park

Shahid Hadis Park is a park located in the heart of Khulna City, on P. C. Ray (Prafulla Chandra Ray) Road, on the west side of the Bangladesh Bank Khulna branch. After the establishment of Khulna Municipality in 1884, the municipality authorities established it as Khulna Municipal Park for the entertainment of the city's residents.In 16th June 1925 Mahatma Gandhi came to Khulna and gave a speech in this park and in his honor the park was renamed Gandhi Park. In 21 February 1969, it was named after Sheikh Hadisur Rahman Babu, who was killed by police firing during the anti-Ayub procession during the mass uprising. A new Shaheed Minar has been built in Shaheed Hadis Park, modeled after the Central Shaheed Minar in Dhaka.

== History ==
In 1884, the municipal authorities established this park under the name 'Khulna Municipal Park'. On June 16, 1925, Mahatma Gandhi spoke in this park. The park was named Gandhi Park in his memory. After the partition of the country in 1947, the park was renamed Jinnah Park. When the anger of the people of East Pakistan against Pakistan increased in the 1960s, the name Khulna Municipal Park was brought back. Finally, on February 22, 1969, the park was named Shahid Hadis Park.

== Shaheed Minar ==
The Shaheed Minar was built in Shaheed Hadis Park in the city in 1974 with the municipality's funds. The Shaheed Minar was inaugurated by the then Khulna Municipality Chairman and language warrior Gazi Shahidullah.

Former Mayor of Khulna City Corporation Talukder Abdul Khaleque took up the project to modernize the Shaheed Minar in Shaheed Hadis Park in Khulna along with other development projects. The work order for the Shaheed Minar was given on November 26, 2012. The project cost is estimated at 84.1 million taka. The area of the Shaheed Minar is 6,860 square feet. The Shaheed Minar was built at a cost of 77 million taka. There is a lake surrounding the Shaheed Minar.

== See also ==
- Ramna Park
- Jashore Municipal Park
