= 2008 Khulna City Corporation election =

Mayoral election in Bangladesh

- 8 May 2008
- Registered: 352,450
- Turnout: 62.00%
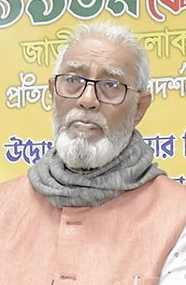
	First party	Second party
Candidate	Talukder Abdul Khaleque	Md. Moniruzzaman Moni
Party	AL	BNP
Popular vote	1,18,829	99,556
Percentage	54.41%	45.59%
Swing	New	New
Mayor before election
Md. Moniruzzaman Moni
Bangladesh Nationalist Party
Elected Mayor
Talukder Abdul Khaleque
Awami League
- Council election
- 8 May 2008; 41 seats in the Khulna City Corporation

The 2008 Khulna City Corporation election was a local government election in the city of Khulna, Bangladesh, held on 8 May 2008 to elect the Mayor of Khulna and the Khulna City Council. The election resulted in a victory for the Awami League candidate Talukder Abdul Khaleque, who defeated the incumbent Bangladesh Nationalist Party candidate Md. Moniruzzaman Moni.

== Result ==
Khulna Mayoral Election 2008
Party	Candidate	Votes	%	±%
AL	Talukder Abdul Khaleque	118,829	54.50	+18.56
BNP	Md. Moniruzzaman Moni	99,556	45.50	−8.65
Majority		19,273	8.84	New
Turnout		218,385	62.00	New
Registered electors		352,450		
AL gain from BNP				
