= 2013 Khulna City Corporation election =

Mayoral election in Bangladesh

- 15 June 2013
- Registered: 440,566 (▲25.00 pp)
- Turnout: 75.45% (▲13.45 pp)
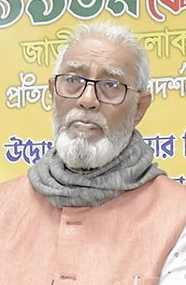
	First party	Second party
Candidate	Md. Moniruzzaman Moni	Talukder Abdul Khaleque
Party	BNP	AL
Popular vote	180,093	119,422
Percentage	54.15%	33.32%
Swing	New	▼24.55%
Mayor before election
Azmal Ahmed
Awami League
Elected Mayor
Md. Moniruzzaman Moni
BNP
- Council election
- 15 June 2013; 41 seats in the Khulna City Corporation

The 2013 Khulna City Corporation election was a local government election in the city of Khulna, Bangladesh, held on 15 June 2013 to elect the Mayor of Khulna and the Khulna City Council. The election resulted in a victory for the Bangladesh Nationalist Party candidate Md. Moniruzzaman Moni, who defeated the incumbent Awami League candidate Talukder Abdul Khaleque.

== Results ==
Mayoral election result
Party	Candidate	Votes	%	±%
BNP	Md. Moniruzzaman Moni	180,093	54.17	+8.61
AL	Talukder Abdul Khaleque	119,422	35.92	−18.52
Majority		60,671	18.25	+9.41
Turnout		332,450	75.45	+13.45
Registered electors		440,566		
BNP gain from AL				
