= 2023 Khulna City Corporation election =

Mayor and council election in Bangladesh

- 12 June 2023
- Registered: 535,528 (▲8.61 pp)
- Turnout: 47.88% (▼12.97 pp)
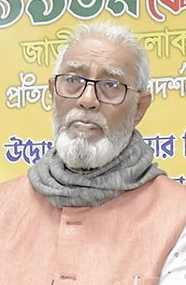
	First party	Second party
Candidate	Talukder Abdul Khaleque	Abdul Awal
Party	AL	IAB
Popular vote	154,825	60,064
Percentage	60.38%	23.42%
Swing	▲2.51pp	New
Mayor before election
Talukder Abdul Khaleque
Awami League
Elected Mayor
Talukder Abdul Khaleque
Awami League
- Council election
- 12 June 2023; 41 (Note: 31 are general, 10 reserved for women) seats in the Khulna City Corporation
Party	Leader	Seats	+/–
AL	Talukder Abdul Khaleque	39	+21
BNP	Didn’t contest	0	−9
Jamaat	—	1	+1
Independent	—	1	−5
This lists parties that won seats. See the complete results below.

The 2023 Khulna City Corporation election was a local government election in the city of Khulna, Bangladesh, held on 12 June 2023 to elect the Mayor of Khulna and the Khulna City Council. The election resulted in a victory for the Awami League candidate Talukder Abdul Khaleque. In the 41-member City Council, the Awami League won 39 seats, while Bangladesh Jamaat-e-Islami won 1 seat and independents won 1 seat. A total of 535,528 people cast their votes 1,732 polling booths under 289 polling stations in Khulna City Corporation election.

== Schedule ==
The schedule of the election was announced by the Election Commission of Bangladesh on 29 March 2023.

Event	Date	Day
Date of Notification	3 April 2023	Monday
Deadline for submission of nomination paper	16 May 2023	
Date for scrutiny of nominations	18 May 2023	
Appeal against the nomination paper scrutiny	19–21 May 2023	
Appeal resolve	22–24 May 2023	
Last date for withdrawal of candidatures	25 May 2023	
Symbols distribution	26 May 2023	
Date of poll & counting	12 June 2023	

== Candidates ==
=== Mayoral election ===
A total of 5 candidates were contested for the mayoral post.

Name	Election Symbol	Party	Ref.
Talukder Abdul Khaleque	Nouka (Boat)	Bangladesh Awami League	
Abdul Awal	Hatpakha (Hand fan)	Islami Andolon Bangladesh	
Shafiqul Islam Madhu	Langol (Plough)	Jatiya Party (Ershad)	
SM Sabbir Hossain	Golap ful (Rose)	Zaker Party	

=== Council election ===
Total of 134 and 39 were contested for 31 general and 10 reserved (women) seats in the city council, respectively.

== Results ==
=== Results by party ===
Vote by party
1. Bangladesh Awami League (60.4%)
2. Islami Andolan Bangladesh (23.4%)
3. Jatiya Party (Ershad) (7.05%)
4. Independent (6.72%)
5. Zaker Party (2.38%)

Candidate	Party	Votes	%
Talukder Abdul Khaleque	Bangladesh Awami League	154,825	60.41
Abdul Awal	Islami Andolan Bangladesh	60,064	23.44
Shafiqul Islam Madhu	Jatiya Party (Ershad)	18,074	7.05
SM Shafiqur Rahman	Independent	17,218	6.72
SM Sabbir Hossain	Zaker Party	6,096	2.38
Total		256,277	100.00
Valid votes		256,277	99.94
Invalid/blank votes		156	0.06
Total votes		256,433	100.00
Registered voters/turnout		535,528	47.88

Talukder Abdul Khaleque was elected as mayor of the Khulna City Corporation by defeating Islami Andolan candidate Abdul Awal.

== See also ==
- 2023 elections in Bangladesh
