= Labanchara Thana =

Labanchara Thana লবনচরা থানা
- Metropolitan Thana
- Location in Bangladesh
- Coordinates: 22°48.5′N 89°34′E
- Country: Bangladesh
- Division: Khulna Division
- District: Khulna District

Area
  - Total: 9.11 km^{2} (3.52 sq mi)

Population (2022)
  - Total: 160,000
  - Density: 18,000/km^{2} (45,000/sq mi)
- Time zone: UTC+6 (BST)
- Website: bangladesh.gov.bd/maps/images/khulna/KhulnaLabancharaT.gif

Labanchara Thana (Bengali: লবনচরা থানা) is a thana of Khulna Metropolitan Police in the Division of Khulna, Bangladesh. It consists of the south part of Khulna city.

== History ==
This police station was established on October 5, 2011. The police station was under the control of Kotwali Thana and Batiaghata Thana.

== Landmarks ==
- Khulna Shipyard
- RAB 6 headquarters
- Khan Jahan Ali Bridge
- Rupsha Rail Bridge
