= North Western University, Bangladesh =

Private university in Khulna, Bangladesh

North Western University
- নর্থ ওয়েস্টার্ন বিশ্ববিদ্যালয়
- Motto: Committed to World Class Education
- Type: Private
- Established: 2012
- Vice-Chancellor: Sheikh Md. Enayetul Babar
- Academic staff: 135
- Students: 2500
- Location: MA Bari Road, Khulna, Khulna District, 9100, Bangladesh; 22.8155°N 89.5433°E
- Campus: 4.69 acres (1.90 ha); Urban
- Language: English
- Website: nwu.ac.bd

North Western University (NWU) (Bengali: নর্থ ওয়েস্টার্ন বিশ্ববিদ্যালয়), established in 18th November 2012, is the first private university of Khulna, Bangladesh. It offers bachelor's degrees in ten subjects and master's degrees in six. One of the founders of the university was Talukder Abdul Khaleque, a Bangladesh Awami League politician.

== History ==
The government of Bangladesh approved the establishment of North Western University under Private University Act. 2010.

North Western University, Khulna the first full-fledged private university in Khulna, was established on 18 November 2012. The university started academic activities from the spring semester, 2013.

The university started with 4 faculties, 67 full-time teachers, and 489 students. In 2018, it added the Faculty of Health Science with the Department of Public Health. As of 2025, enrollment was 2,500.

== Campus ==
The university is on 236, M.A Bari Road, Khulna 9100. It has two commercial buildings with one administrative buildings.

- Administration Building.
- Engineering Building.

Permanent campus is under construction beside of Rupsha Bridge Highway in Kholabaria area of Labanchara.

== Programs ==
Faculty of Engineering

- Bachelor of Science (BSc) - in
  - Computer Science & Engineering (CSE)
  - Electrical & Electronic Engineering (EEE)
  - Electrical & Communication Engineering (ECE)
  - Civil Engineering (CE)

Business Studies

- Business Studies
  - Bachelor of Business Administration (BBA)
  - Master of Business Administration (Regular-2 years) (MBA)
  - Master of Business Administration (Regular-1 year for BBA holders) (MBA)
  - Master of Business Administration for Executives (Regular-16 Months) (EMBA)

Arts & Human Science

- Law
- English

Social Science

- MDS
- Sociology
  - Bachelor of Social Science (BSS) in Sociology
  - Bachelor of Social Science (BSS) in Economics
  - Master of Social Science (MSS) in Economics
  - Master of Development Studies (MDS)

== Semesters ==
The academic year of the university incorporates two regular semesters (spring and fall) and one short semester (summer). The duration of each regular semester is 14/16 weeks and the duration of summer semester is 10/12 weeks.

- Spring semester: January to July
- Fall semester: July to December
