= Jogipol Union =

Jogipol Union যোগীপোল ইউনিয়ন
- Union
- Location in Bangladesh
- Coordinates: 22.9008°N 89.5060°E
- Country: Bangladesh
- Division: Khulna Division
- District: Khulna District
- Upazila: Dighalia Upazila

Government
  - Type: Union council
  - Chairman: Sajjadur Rahman Lingkon
- Time zone: UTC+6 (BST)
- Postal code: 9203
- Website: jogipolup.khulna.gov.bd

Jogipol Union (Bengali: যোগীপোল ইউনিয়ন) is a union parishad in Dighalia Upazila of Khulna District, in Khulna Division, Bangladesh.

== Location ==
Jogipol Union is situated in the southern side of Atra Gilatala Union, eastern side of Rangpur Union, western side of KCC's ward no. 02 and northern side of KCC's ward no. 01.

== Villages ==
Jogipol Union Parishad is consist with nine wards. There are six villages and two Mouzas. This union is administrated by two different Thanas.

No.	Village's Name	Mouza Name	Police Station
01	Rajapur	Teliganti	Aranghata Thana
02	Teliganti	Teliganti	Aranghata Thana
03	Khanabari	Teliganti	Aranghata Thana
04	Fulbari	Jugipol	Khan Jahan Ali Thana
05	Jabdipur	Jugipol	Khan Jahan Ali Thana
06	Jogipol	Jugipol	Khan Jahan Ali Thana

== Markets ==
- Teliganti Pakarmatha Bazar
- Jabdipur Bou Bazar
- Fulbari Gate Daroga Bazar

== Educational institutions ==
=== Universities ===
- Khulna University of Engineering & Technology

=== Colleges ===
- Govt. Teacher's Training College
- Khan Jahan Ali Technical & BM College

=== Schools ===
- Teligati High School
- Govt. Laboratory High School, Khulna
- Khanabari Girl's High School
- Fulbari Adarsha Secondary School
- Khulna Engineering University School
- Jogipol Government Primary School
- Jabdipur Government Primary School
