= Shaikh Faridul Islam =

Bangladeshi politician

- শেখ ফরিদুল ইসলাম
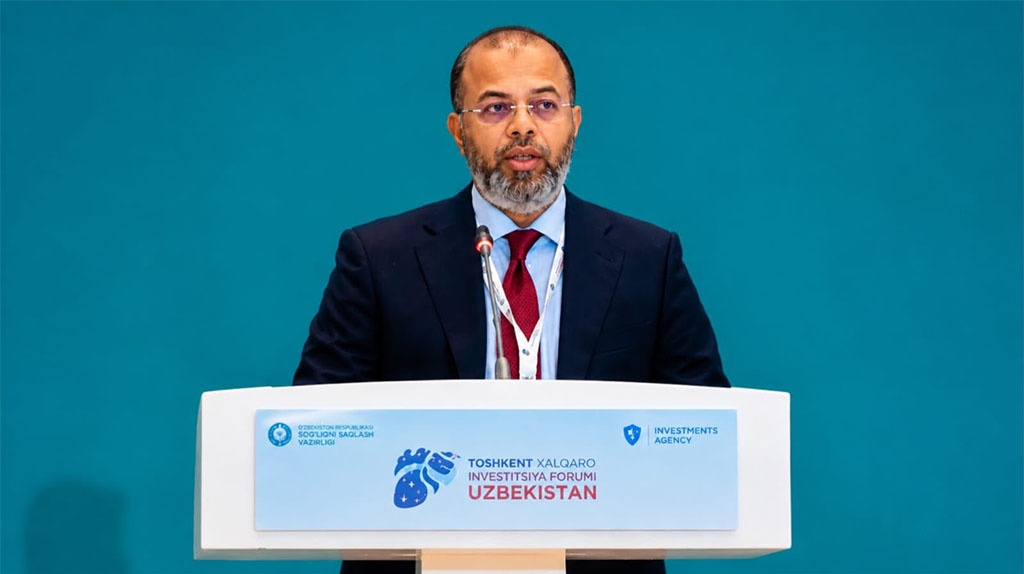
- Islam in 2026

Minister of State for Environment, Forest and Climate Change
- Incumbent
- Assumed office 17 February 2026
- Prime Minister: Tarique Rahman
- Preceded by: Abdullah Al Islam Jacob

Member of Parliament
- Incumbent
- Assumed office 17 February 2026
- Preceded by: Habibun Nahar
- Constituency: Bagerhat-3

Personal details
- Born: 3 January 1970 (age 56) Bagerhat, East Pakistan, Pakistan
- Party: Bangladesh Nationalist Party
- Education: American World University

Shaikh Faridul Islam (born 3 January 1970) is a Bangladeshi politician. He is the incumbent Minister of State for Environment, Forest and Climate Change and the incumbent Jatiya Sangsad member representing the Bagerhat-3 constituency. He was elected in the 13th Jatiya Sangsad election as a candidate of the Bangladesh Nationalist Party (BNP).

== Early life and education ==
Faridul Islam was born in Baradia village under Rampal Upazila in Bagerhat District, Bangladesh. His father, Alhaj S.K. Abdur Rahman, was a retired businessman, and his mother, Alhaj Shakhina Begum, was a homemaker.

Islam completed his primary education in his village. He passed the Secondary School Certificate (SSC) examination in 1984 from Baintala Kashipur High School and the Higher Secondary Certificate (HSC) examination in 1986 from Abul Kalam College, Rampal, Bagerhat. He obtained his Bachelor of Arts (Honours) and Master of Arts degrees from the University of Dhaka (examination held in 1990, result published in 1992).

Islam earned a PhD in environmental science in 2012 from American World University, California, United States. His research was titled “Climate Change and Livelihood in the Sundarbans of Bangladesh.”

== Political career ==
Islam was elected as a Member of Parliament for Bagerhat-3 in the 13th Jatiya Sangsad election held in 2026, representing the Bangladesh Nationalist Party. This was his first election to the national parliament. He is also involved in providing free eye care services alongside his political activities.
