= Khulna WASA =

Water and sewer company of Khulna, Bangladesh

- খুলনা পানি সরবরাহ ও পয়ঃনিষ্কাশন কর্তৃপক্ষ
- Seal of Khulna WASA

Agency overview
- Formed: 2 March 2008; 18 years ago
- Jurisdiction: Khulna
- Headquarters: Khulna WASA Bhaban, 07 Roosevelt Jettyghat Road, Joragate, Khalishpur, Khulna
- Agency executives: Md. Moniruzzaman Moni, Chairman; Md. Feroz shah, Managing Director
- Parent agency: Local Government Division
- Website: www.kwasa.org.bd

Khulna Water Supply & Sewerage Authority or KWASA (Generally known as Khulna WASA) is a government-owned water supplier organization. It is a parallel organization of Khulna City Corporation.

== History ==
Water supply system was first installed in Khulna in 1921. That time, they supplied 900 cubic metres of water per day. In 1960, Khulna Water Supply Authority started to supply water by production tubewell. Then Khulna Water Supply & Sewerage Authority was established in 2008. It is independent of Khulna City Corporation.

== Services ==
Khulna WASA serves residents of the city by supplying pure water from 110 MLD Surface Water Treatment Plant of Rupsha. Khulna WASA also sells bottle water labeled by Sundarban Pure Drinking Water from the Bottle Water Plant situated in Rayer Mahal of Khulna city.

== Projects ==
Khulna WASA is set-upping sewerage network throughout the Khulna city under the Khulna Sewerage System Development Project. Two sewage treatment plants will be constructed in this project.
