= KDA =

KDA, or similar, may refer to:

== Businesses and organisations ==
=== Government and politics ===
- Kollam Development Authority, India
- Kachin Defense Army, Myanmar
- Karachi Development Authority, Pakistan
- Khulna Development Authority, Bangladesh
- Combat Groups of the Working Class (German: Kampfgruppen der Arbeiterklasse; KdA), East Germany

=== Military ===
- Kongsberg Defence & Aerospace, a Norwegian weapons supplier
- General Sir John Kotelawala Defence University (informally Kotelawala Defence Academy), Sri Lanka

=== Other organisations ===
- Kentucky Distillers' Association, an American trade group
- Kennedy's Disease Association, an American medical charity

== Music ==
- K/DA, a virtual K-pop group
- KDA (DJ), an English house DJ

== Other uses ==
- Kilodalton (kDa), 1000 unified atomic mass units
- Worimi language, spoken in NSW, Australia (ISO 639-3:kda)
- Kills, deaths, and assists, a score-tracking concept in certain video games
