= Harintana Thana =

Harintana Thana হরিণটানা থানা
- Metropolitan Thana
- Location in Bangladesh
- Coordinates: 22°48.5′N 89°34′E
- Country: Bangladesh
- Division: Khulna Division
- District: Khulna District

Area
  - Total: 16 km^{2} (6.2 sq mi)

Population (2022)
  - Total: 25,000
  - Density: 1,600/km^{2} (4,000/sq mi)
- Time zone: UTC+6 (BST)
- Website: bangladesh.gov.bd/maps/images/khulna/KhulnaHarintanaT.gif

Harintana Thana (Bengali: হরিণটানা থানা) is a thana of Khulna Metropolitan Police in the Division of Khulna, Bangladesh.

== Landmarks ==
- University of Khulna
- Khulna Medical University
- Zero point
