= Bagerhat-3 =

Constituency of Bangladesh's Jatiya Sangsad

Coordinates: 22.56°N 89.65°E

- Constituency for the Jatiya Sangsad
- District: Bagerhat District
- Division: Khulna Division
- Electorate: 266,864 (2026)

Current constituency
- Created: 1984
- Party: Bangladesh Nationalist Party
- Member: Shaikh Faridul Islam
- ← 96 Bagerhat-2 98 Bagerhat-4 →

Bagerhat-3 is a constituency represented in the Jatiya Sangsad (National Parliament) of Bangladesh since 2026 by Shaikh Faridul Islam of the Bangladesh Nationalist Party.

== Boundaries ==
The constituency encompasses Mongla, and Rampal upazilas.

== History ==
The constituency was created in 1984 from a Khulna constituency when the former Khulna District was split into three districts: Bagerhat, Khulna, and Satkhira.

In 2025, the Election Commission announced that it would reduce the number of constituencies in Bagerhat District from four to three. They said they were evening out voters per constituency to ensure balanced representation. Their redistricting would have moved Fakirhat Upazila from Bagerhat-1 to Bagerhat-2, Bagerhat Sadar Upazila from Bagerhat-2 to Bagerhat-1, Kachua Upazila from Bagerhat-2 to Bagerhat-3, Rampal and Mongla upazilas from Bagerhat-3 to Bagerhat-2, and Morrelganj and Sarankhola upazilas from Bagerhat-4 to Bagerhat-3. Locals objected to the changes.

The High Court found that eliminating Bagerhat-4 solely because of low population was unsound and not supported by demographic data. They invalidated the changes, and their decision was upheld on appeal. So the 2026 general election went ahead with the long-standing constituency boundaries.

== Members of Parliament ==
| Election | Member | Party |
|---|---|---|
| 1986 | Aftab Uddin Howlader | Jatiya Party |
| 1991 | Talukder Abdul Khaleque | Awami League |
| Feb 1996 | AU Ahmed | Bangladesh Nationalist Party |
| Jun 1996 | Talukder Abdul Khaleque | Awami League |
| 2008 | Habibun Nahar | Awami League |
| 2014 | Talukder Abdul Khaleque | Awami League |
| 2018 | Habibun Nahar | Awami League |
| 2024 | Habibun Nahar | Awami League |
| 2026 | Shaikh Faridul Islam | Bangladesh Nationalist Party |

== Elections ==
=== Elections in the 2020s ===
General Election 2026: Bagerhat-3
| Party | Candidate | Votes | % | ±% |
|---|---|---|---|---|
| BNP | Shaikh Faridul Islam | 102,661 | 53.9 | N/A |
| Jamaat | Mohammed Abdul Wadud Sheikh | 83,550 | 43.8 | N/A |
| IAB | Sheikh Zillur Rahman | 3,640 | 1.9 | N/A |
| Independent | MAH Selim | 425 | 0.2 | N/A |
| JSD (Rab) | Md. Habibur Rahman Master | 349 | 0.2 | N/A |
| Majority | | 19,111 | 10.0 | N/A |
| Turnout | | 190,625 | 71.4 | N/A |
| BNP gain from AL | | | | |

=== Elections in the 2010s ===
To run for mayor of Khulna, Talukder Abdul Khaleque resigned from parliament on 10 April 2018. Habibun Nahar, his wife, was elected unopposed on 4 June, as she was the only candidate in the by-election scheduled for later that month.

Talukder Abdul Khaleque was elected unopposed in the 2014 general election after opposition parties withdrew their candidacies in a boycott of the election.

=== Elections in the 2000s ===
General Election 2008: Bagerhat-3
| Party | Candidate | Votes | % | ±% |
|---|---|---|---|---|
| AL | Habibun Nahar | 97,015 | 58.2 | +7.3 |
| Jamaat | Mohammad Abdul Owadud Shaikh | 66,177 | 39.7 | N/A |
| IAB | Md. Muzzammil Haque | 3,174 | 1.9 | N/A |
| Gano Front | Md. Sekender Ali Moni | 274 | 0.2 | N/A |
| Majority | | 30,838 | 18.5 | +13.6 |
| Turnout | | 166,640 | 89.3 | +8.8 |
| AL hold | | | | |

General Election 2001: Bagerhat-3
| Party | Candidate | Votes | % | ±% |
|---|---|---|---|---|
| AL | Talukder Abdul Khaleque | 76,779 | 50.9 | +6.8 |
| Jamaat | Gazi Abu Bakar Siddiqui | 69,310 | 45.9 | +17.0 |
| Jatiya Party (M) | M. A. Khaleq Hawlader | 3,052 | 2.0 | N/A |
| IJOF | A. T. M. Hemayet Uddin | 1,803 | 1.2 | N/A |
| Majority | | 7,469 | 4.9 | −10.3 |
| Turnout | | 150,944 | 80.5 | +3.7 |
| AL hold | | | | |

=== Elections in the 1990s ===
General Election June 1996: Bagerhat-3
| Party | Candidate | Votes | % | ±% |
|---|---|---|---|---|
| AL | Talukder Abdul Khaleque | 52,445 | 44.1 | −2.4 |
| Jamaat | Gazi Abu Bakar Siddiqui | 34,321 | 28.9 | −3.6 |
| BNP | A. U. Ahmed | 21,550 | 18.1 | +0.1 |
| JP(E) | Khan Amzad Ali | 4,809 | 4.0 | +1.4 |
| IOJ | Md. Mozammel Haque | 4,726 | 4.0 | N/A |
| WPB | Mohiuddin Sheikh | 450 | 0.4 | N/A |
| Zaker Party | Md. Yunus Ali Mollik | 385 | 0.3 | −0.2 |
| Bangladesh Muslim League (Jamir Ali) | S. M. Islam | 154 | 0.1 | N/A |
| NDP | Daniel Biswash | 48 | 0.0 | N/A |
| Majority | | 18,124 | 15.2 | +1.2 |
| Turnout | | 118,888 | 76.8 | +20.2 |
| AL hold | | | | |

General Election 1991: Bagerhat-3
| Party | Candidate | Votes | % | ±% |
|---|---|---|---|---|
| AL | Talukder Abdul Khaleque | 46,126 | 46.5 | |
| Jamaat | Gazi Abu Bakar Siddiqui | 32,205 | 32.5 | |
| BNP | A S M Mustafizur Rahman | 17,812 | 18.0 | |
| JP(E) | Sheik Abdus Sabur | 2,593 | 2.6 | |
| Zaker Party | Syed Akramul Haq | 487 | 0.5 | |
| Majority | | 13,921 | 14.0 | |
| Turnout | | 99,223 | 56.6 | |
| AL gain from JP(E) | | | | |
