= AU Ahmed =

Bangladeshi politician

- এ ইউ আহমেদ

Member of Parliament from Bagerhat-3
- In office 15 February 1996 – 12 June 1996
- Preceded by: Talukder Abdul Khaleque
- Succeeded by: Talukder Abdul Khaleque

Personal details
- Party: Bangladesh Nationalist Party

AU Ahmed is a Bangladesh Nationalist Party politician. He was elected a member of parliament for Bagerhat-3 in February 1996.

== Career ==
Prafulla Kumar Mandal was elected to parliament for Bagerhat-3 as a Bangladesh Nationalist Party candidate in the 15 February 1996 Bangladeshi general election.

He was defeated in the Bagerhat-3 constituency on 12 June 1996 on the nomination of the Bangladesh Nationalist Party.
