= Thana Development Coordination Committee =

Bangladeshi governing body

- থানা উন্নয়ন সমন্বয় কমিটি
- Abbreviation: TDCC
- Formation: 1993
- Abolished: c. 1998—2009

Thana Development Coordination Committee (থানা উন্নয়ন সমন্বয় কমিটি, abbreviated as TDCC) was a council for regional development in thanas across Bangladesh.

== History ==
In 1993, the BNP government formed Thana Development Coordination Committee after abolishing the upazila system.

After the Awami League came back to power in 2009, TDCC was practically non-existent.

== Structure ==
Thana Development Coordination Committee, which was a significant part of local governance, was composed of union council chairmen and government officials.

== Purpose ==
The Thana Development Coordination Committee was formed for regional development, decentralization and improving local projects and coordination in thanas. The council had presence in all administrative thanas of Bangladesh back then and replaced sub-district and thana councils.
