= Khulna Divisional Museum =

Museum in Khulna, Bangladesh

Coordinates: 22.82°N 89.55°E

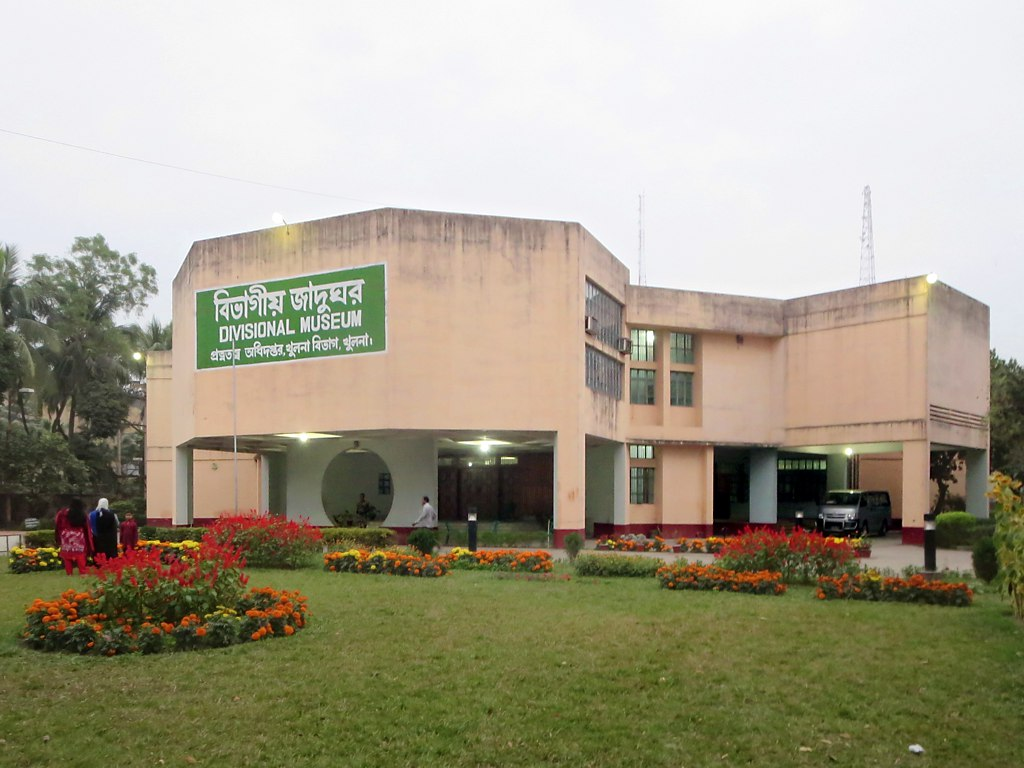
- Established: 1998
- Location: Shib Bari More, Khulna, Bangladesh

Khulna Divisional Museum is the only museum of Khulna City. It was established by Bangladesh Archaeological Department. It is the second largest museum in Bangladesh after Bangladesh National Museum by area. This museum is full of archaeological evidence, structures & photos of South Bengal. The archaeological excavation leftovers from "Bharata Bhayana" (kingdom of King bharat) are kept here. Bharat Rajar Deul (site name), has yielded the substantial ruins of a brick-built curious structure. It has also yielded some busts of princely male figures, Hindu God, Goddess structure, potteries of early medieval origin etc. On stylistic ground they may be dated in circa 5th-6th century AD. Gold and silver coin from Emperor Jehangir's time is also displayed here.

== Features ==
This museum is full of archaeological evidence, structures & photos of South Bengal. The archaeological things from Bharata Bhayana are kept here.
