= Tahin Tahera =

Bangladeshi cricketer (born 1990)

Personal information
- Full name: Tahin Tahera
- Born: 28 June 1990 (age 36); Khulna, Bangladesh
- Batting: Left-handed
- Bowling: Slow left-arm orthodox
- Role: All-rounder

Domestic team information
- Years: Team
- 2008/09–2017: Khulna Division
- 2017/18: Rangpur Division

Career statistics
Competition	WLA	WT20
Matches	14	2
Runs scored	59	20
Batting average	11.80	10.00
100s/50s	0/0	0/0
Top score	20	10
Balls bowled	276	–
Wickets	5	–
Bowling average	26.80	–
5 wickets in innings	0	–
10 wickets in match	0	–
Best bowling	2/5	–
Catches/stumpings	0/–	0/–
- Source: CricketArchive, 17 April 2022

Tahin Tahera (Bengali: তাহিন তাহেরা) (born 28 June 1990) is a Bangladeshi former cricketer. An all-rounder, she batted left-handed was a slow left-arm orthodox bowler. She played for Bangladesh in 2011, before the side was granted full international status. She played domestic cricket for Khulna Division and Rangpur Division.

== Early life and background ==
Tahera was born on 28 June 1990 in Khulna, Bangladesh.
