= Sheikh Tayebur Rahman =

Bangladeshi politician

1st Mayor of Khulna
- In office 22 May 1991 – 29 November 2007
- Preceded by: A. K. M. Fazlul Haque Miah
- Succeeded by: Md. Moniruzzaman Moni

Personal details
- Born: 21 October 1936 Bagerhat, East Bengal, British Raj
- Died: 3 January 2016 (aged 79) Khulna, Bangladesh
- Cause of death: Brain Stroke
- Party: Bangladesh Nationalist Party
- Spouse: Laila Rahman
- Children: 3 daughter

Sheikh Tayebur Rahman is a Bangladesh Nationalist Party politician and the former Mayor of Khulna.

== Early life ==
Rahman was born on 21 October 1936 in Bagerhat, East Bengal, British Raj.

== Career ==
Rahman served as the forest and environment affairs secretary of the Bangladesh Nationalist Party. He served as the mayor of Khulna of 17 years and ten months in three consecutive terms. He was a shareholder and director of Destiny-2000. He was disqualified from contesting in the 2008 Mayoral election of Khulna as he had been convicted of a crime and the election was won by the Awami League backed candidate Md. Moniruzzaman Moni. It was the first time since 1973, when M. A. Bari won, that an Awami League candidate was elected Mayor of Khulna City.

=== Corruption ===
On 3 November 2007, Rahman was arrested on corruption charges by Bangladesh Police. In 2008, he was sentenced to 17 years in jail in two extortion cases. He was sentenced to ten years in jail on 26 May 2008 by a court in Khulna. On 30 December 2009, Anti-Corruption Commission sued him for illegally appointing extra employees while serving as the mayor of Khulna.

== Personal life ==
Rahman was married to Laila Rahman and they have three daughters and one son together.

== Death ==
Rahman had a brain stroke on 1 January 2016 and was admitted to Nargis Memorial Clinic in Khulna, Bangladesh. He died on 3 January 2016.
