= Mayor of Khulna =

Official post of KCC

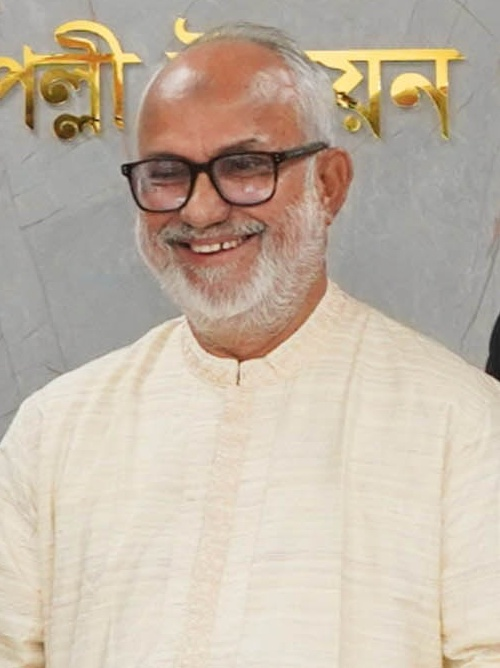
- Incumbent; Nazrul Islam Manju (Administrator) since 1 March, 2026
- Khulna City Corporation
- Style: Honourable (formal)
- Type: Council Leader
- Member of: Khulna City Corporation
- Seat: Nagar Bhaban, Khulna
- Appointer: Electorate of Khulna
- Term length: Five years, renewable
- Constituting instrument: The City Corporation act, 2009
- Inaugural holder: Sheikh Tayebur Rahman
- Formation: 12 December 1984; 41 years ago
- Salary: ৳150000 (US$1,200) per month (incl. allowances)
- Website: Khulna City Corporation

The Mayor of Khulna is the chief elected executive of the Khulna City Corporation. The Mayor’s office oversees civic services, manages public properties, and coordinates the functions of various government agencies within the city. In addition, the Mayor is responsible for enforcing city corporation regulations and state laws, thereby ensuring good governance and the sustainable development of Khulna.

The Mayor's office is located in Nagar Bhaban; it has jurisdiction over all 31 wards of Khulna City.

== List of officeholders ==
Political parties

- Bangladesh Awami League
- Bangladesh Nationalist Party

Other factions

Independent

Status

Acting Mayor and Administrator

No.	Portrait	Officeholder (birth–death)	Election	Term of office			Designation	Political party	Reference
No.	Portrait	Officeholder (birth–death)	Election	From	To	Period	Designation	Political party	Reference
–		Kazi Aminul Haque	—	9 August 1988	9 December 1990	2 years, 77 days	Administrator	Independent	
–		A. K. M. Fazlul Haque Miah	—	15 December 1990	22 May 1991	158 days	Divisional Commissioner & Administrator	Independent	
1		Sheikh Tayebur Rahman; (1936–2016)	1994; 2002	22 May 1991	29 November 2007	16 years, 191 days	Mayor	Bangladesh Nationalist Party	
2		Md. Moniruzzaman Moni	–	20 November 2007	15 September 2008	300 days	Mayor	Bangladesh Nationalist Party	
3		Talukder Abdul Khaleque	2008	14 September 2008	9 June 2013	4 years, 268 days	Mayor	Bangladesh Awami League	
–		Azmal Ahmed	—	30 June 2013	23 September 2013	85 days	Acting Mayor	Bangladesh Awami League	
4		Md. Moniruzzaman Moni	2013	23 September 2013	2 November 2015	2 years, 40 days	Mayor	Bangladesh Nationalist Party	
–		Anisur Rahman Biswas	—	3 November 2015	20 November 2016	1 year, 17 days	Acting Mayor	Bangladesh Nationalist Party	
4		Md. Moniruzzaman Moni	—	21 November 2016	19 May 2018	1 year, 179 days	Mayor	Bangladesh Nationalist Party	
5		Talukder Abdul Khaleque	2018; 2023	20 May 2018	19 August 2024	6 years, 91 days	Mayor	Bangladesh Awami League	
–		Md. Helal Mahmud Sharif	–	19 August 2024	8 December 2025	111 days	Divisional Commissioner & Administrator	Independent	
–		Md. Firoz Sarker	–	8 December 2024	14 October 2025	310 days	Divisional Commissioner & Administrator	Independent	
–		Md. Firoz Shah	–	14 October 2025	18 November 2025	35 days	Divisional Commissioner (Acting) & Administrator (Acting)	Independent	
–		Md. Mokhtar Ahmed	–	18 November 2025	28 February 2026	102 days	Divisional Commissioner & Administrator	Independent	
–		Nazrul Islam Manju	–	1 March 2026	Present	190 days	Administrator	Bangladesh Nationalist Party	

== Elections ==
=== Election Result 2023 ===
Khulna Mayoral Election 2023
Party	Candidate	Votes	%	±%
AL	Talukder Abdul Khaleque	154,825	60.41	−7.88
IAB	Abdul Awal	60,064	23.44	+17.83
JP(E)	Shafiqul Islam Madhu	18,074	7.05	+3.99
Independent	SM Shafiqur Rahman	17,218	6.72	+6.21
Zaker Party	SM Sabbir Hossain	6,096	2.38	+2.38
Majority		94,761	36.97	−25.71
Turnout		256,433	47.88	−4.07
Registered electors		535,528		
AL hold				

=== Election Result 2018 ===
Khulna Mayoral Election 2018
Party	Candidate	Votes	%	±%
AL	Talukder Abdul Khaleque	174,851	58.87	+22.95
BNP	Nazrul Islam Manju	109,251	36.78	−17.37
IAB	Muzammil Haque	14,363	4.84	+4.84
JP(E)	SM Shafiqur Rahman Mushfiq	1,072	0.36	+0.36
CPB	Mizanur Rahman Babu	534	0.18	+0.18
Majority		65,600	22.09	+3.86
Turnout		300,071	60.85	−2.25
Registered electors		493,093		
AL gain from BNP				

=== Election Result 2013 ===
Khulna Mayoral Election 2013
Party	Candidate	Votes	%	±%
BNP	Md. Moniruzzaman Moni	180,093	54.17	+8.61
AL	Talukder Abdul Khaleque	119,422	35.92	−18.52
Majority		60,671	18.25	+9.41
Turnout		332,450	75.45	+13.45
Registered electors		440,566		
BNP gain from AL				

=== Election Result 2008 ===
Khulna Mayoral Election 2008
Party	Candidate	Votes	%	±%
AL	Talukder Abdul Khaleque	118,829	54.44	New
BNP	Md. Moniruzzaman Moni	99,556	45.56	New
Majority		19,273	8.84	New
Turnout		218,385	62.00	New
Registered electors		352,450		
AL gain from BNP				
