= Jashore Municipal Park =

Urban Park in Jashore, Bangladesh

- যশোর পৌর পার্ক যশোর মিউনিসিপাল পার্ক
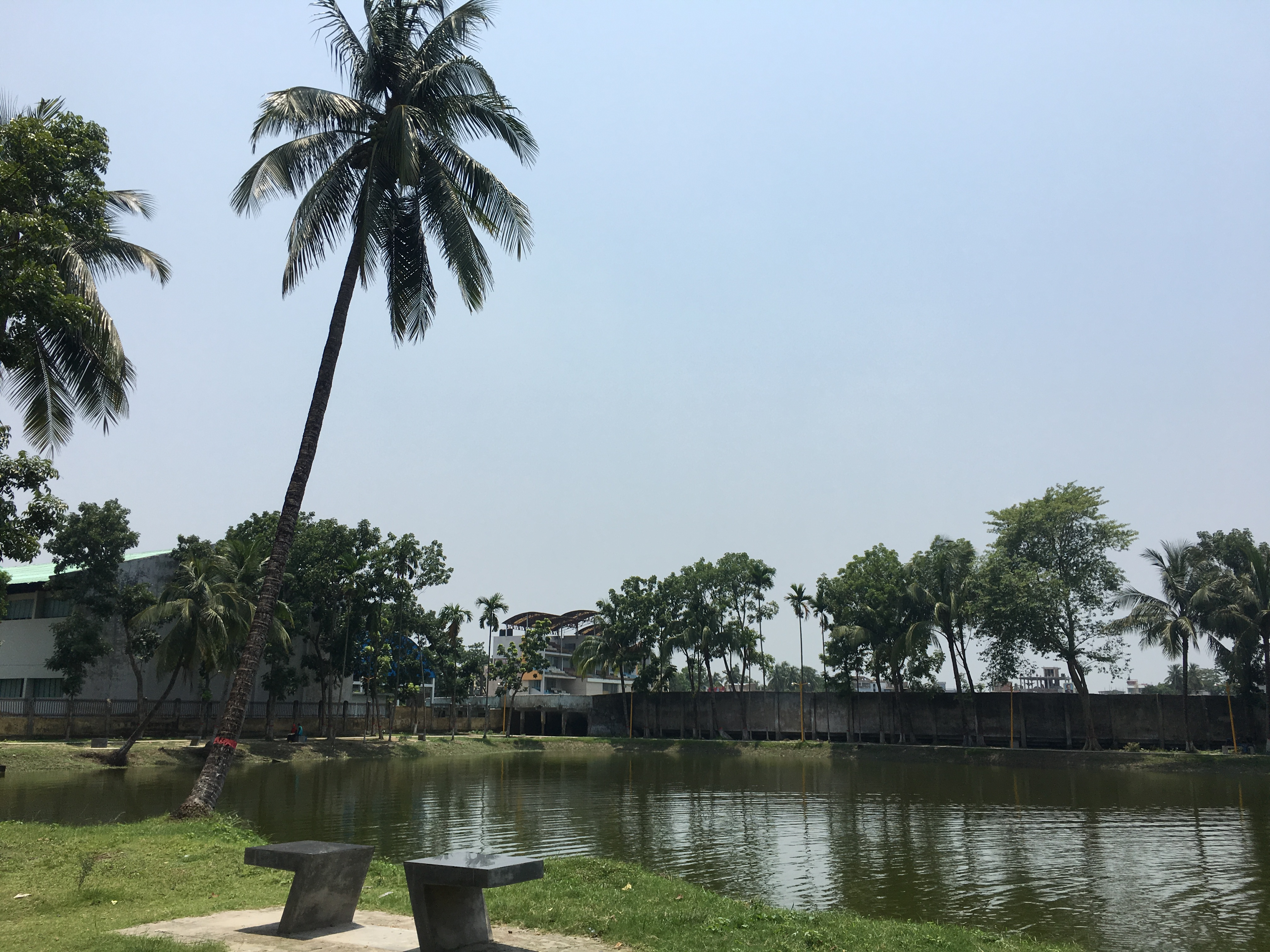
- Pondside of the municipal park
- Interactive map of Jashore Municipal Park
- Type: Park
- Location: Stadium Road, Jashore, Bangladesh
- Coordinates: 23.1641°N 89.2065°E
- Area: 10 acres (0.040 km^{2})
- Owner: Jashore Municipality
- Administrator: Jashore Municipality
- Open: 6 am to 10 pm (summer) 7 am to 8.30 pm (winter)
- Status: Open all year
- Water: Pounds
- Parking: Yes
- Public transit: Jashore Pourosova

Jashore Municipal Park (Bengali: যশোর পৌর পার্ক, romanized: Jashore Puoro Park) is an urban park and public space located in Jashore, Bangladesh. It is one of the oldest park in Bangladesh. It was established in 1868.

== History ==
After the establishment of Jashore Municipality in 1864, Jashore Municipality established this garden for the citizens of Jashore city. It was established next to the Jashore City Hall.

== See also ==
- Ramna Park
- Suhrawardy Udyan
- Shahid Hadis Park
