= Khulna Development Authority =

Governing body responsible for development in Khulna

- খুলনা উন্নয়ন কর্তৃপক্ষ

Agency overview
- Formed: 21 January 1961; 65 years ago
- Superseding agency: Development of Khulna
- Jurisdiction: Khulna, Noapara, Mongla and its surrounding area(824 km^{2}).
- Headquarters: KDA Bhaban, KDA Avenue, Shib Bari Mor, Khulna-9100
- Agency executive: SM Shafiqul Alam, Chairman
- Parent department: Ministry of Housing and Public Works
- Parent agency: Government of Bangladesh
- Website: www.kda.gov.bd

Khulna Development Authority (Bengali: খুলনা উন্নয়ন কর্তৃপক্ষ, romanized: Khulnā Unnôẏôn Kôrtipôkkhô; abbreviated as KDA) is a Bangladesh government urban planning authority responsible for the planned development, regulation, and management of Khulna, Bangladesh. Established in 1961 by the Government of Bangladesh, the authority is responsible for preparing and implementing the city's master plans, regulating urban development activities, and guiding the expansion of the Khulna metropolitan area. It operates under the Ministry of Housing and Public Works.

== Projects completed by KDA ==
- Construction of KDA Avenue and Majid Sarani with commercial plots.
- Sonadanga Residential Area
- Construction of KDA Outer Bypass Road a.k.a. Mujgunni Highway
- MA Bari Road
- Mujgunni Residential Area
- Nirala Residential Area
- KDA Shiromoni Residential Area
- KDA Shiromoni Industrial Area
- KDA Mirerdanga Residential Area
- KDA Daulatpur Residential Area
- KDA Nibir Residential Area
- KDA Moyuri Residential Area
- Construction of Teligati Bypass Road
- Construction of Bastuhara Byapass Road
- Construction of Jalil Sarani
- Construction of Rayer Mahal to Koiya Bazar Road
- Construction of Sonadanga Bypass Road
- Construction of Jabbar Sarani

=== Ongoing projects ===
- Shipyard Road Extension
- Construction of Nirala Bypass Road
- Construction of Gallamari - Rayer Mahal Road
- Construction of Bastuhara - Aranghata Road
- Construction of KDA Biponi Bitan

== See also ==
- Khulna City Corporation
- Khulna Metropolitan Police
