= Aranghata Thana =

Aranghata Thana আড়ংঘাটা থানা
- Metropolitan Thana
- Location in Bangladesh
- Coordinates: 22°55.2′N 89°28.8′E
- Country: Bangladesh
- Division: Khulna Division
- District: Khulna District

Area
  - Total: 18.5 km^{2} (7.1 sq mi)

Population (2022)
  - Total: 100,000
  - Density: 5,400/km^{2} (14,000/sq mi)
- Time zone: UTC+6 (BST)
- Website: bangladesh.gov.bd/maps/images/khulna/aranghataT.gif

Aranghata Thana (Bengali: আড়ংঘাটা থানা) is a thana of Khulna Metropolitan Police in the Division of Khulna, Bangladesh.

== Landmarks ==
- Aranghata Railway station
- Khulna Agricultural University
