= Kotwali Thana, Khulna =

Thana in Khulna City Corporation, Bangladesh

Kotwali Thana কোতোয়ালি থানা খুলনা সদর
- Metropolitan Thana
- Location in Bangladesh Kotwali Thana (Bangladesh)
- Coordinates: 22°48.5′N 89°34′E
- Country: Bangladesh
- Division: Khulna Division
- District: Khulna District
- Metropolitan Police station: Khulna Metropolitan Police

Area
  - Total: 9.45 km^{2} (3.65 sq mi)

Population (2022)
  - Total: 248,220
  - Density: 26,300/km^{2} (68,000/sq mi)
- Time zone: UTC+6 (BST)
- Postal code: 9000
- Area code: 041
- Website: bangladesh.gov.bd/maps/images/khulna/KhulnaKotwaliT.gif

Kotwali Thana (Bengali: কোতোয়ালি থানা) is a thana of Khulna Metropolitan Police in the Division of Khulna, Bangladesh. It is also known as Khulna Sadar. It is the most densely populated subdistrict in the division.

== Geography ==
Kotwali Thana is located at 22.8083°N 89.5667°E. It has 36895 households and total area 9.45 km^{2}.

== Demographics ==
Religions in Daulatpur Thana (2022)
Religion	Percent
Islam	85.59%
Hinduism	13.35%
Christianity	1.04%
Other or not stated	0.02%

According to the 2022 Bangladeshi census, Kotwali Thana had 65,425 households and a population of 248,220. 7.23% were under 5 years of age. Kotwali had a literacy rate of 88.40%: 90.40% for males and 86.32% for females, and a sex ratio of 103.80 males per 100 females.

At the 1991 Bangladesh census, Kotwali Thana had a population of 191,910, of whom 111,725 were aged 18 or older. Males constituted 54.87% of the population, and females constituted 45.13%. It had an average literacy rate of 59.7% (7+ years), against the national average of 32.4%. At the 2001 census, it had a population of 250,651, and at the 2011 Census of Bangladesh, 224,444.

== See also ==
- Thanas of Bangladesh
- Upazilas of Bangladesh
- Districts of Bangladesh
- Divisions of Bangladesh
