= Habibun Nahar =

Bangladeshi politician

- হাবিবুন নাহার
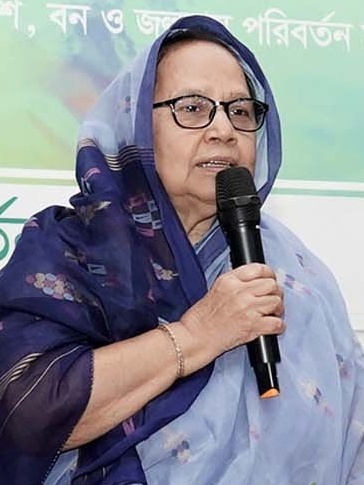
- Nahar in Dhaka (2023)

Deputy Minister of Environment, Forest and Climate Change
- In office 7 January 2019 – 6 August 2024
- Prime Minister: Sheikh Hasina
- Preceded by: Abdullah Al Islam Jakob

Member of Parliament for Bagerhat-3
- In office 3 June 2018 – 6 August 2024
- Preceded by: Talukder Abdul Khaleque
- In office 2009–2014
- Preceded by: Talukder Abdul Khaleque
- Succeeded by: Talukder Abdul Khaleque

Personal details
- Born: 18 September 1954 (age 71)
- Party: Bangladesh Awami League
- Spouse: Talukder Abdul Khaleque

Habibun Nahar (born 18 September 1954) is a Bangladesh Awami League politician who is a former Jatiya Sangsad member representing the Bagerhat-3 constituency and the deputy minister of environment, forest and climate change.

== Career ==
Habibun Nahar was nominated to contest the Bagerhat-3 constituency in May 2018 by the Bangladesh Awami League. The seat fell vacant following the resignation of the then member of parliament and her husband, Talukder Abdul Khaleque, to contest the Khulna mayoral election. She was elected to parliament on 4 June 2018 uncontested.
