= Daulatpur Thana, Khulna =

Thana in Khulna City Corporation, Bangladesh

Daulatpur দৌলতপুর
- Upazila
- Location in Bangladesh Daulatpur (Bangladesh)
- Coordinates: 22°53.3′N 89°31′E
- Country: Bangladesh
- Division: Khulna Division
- District: Khulna District

Area
  - Total: 7.69 km^{2} (2.97 sq mi)

Population (2022)
  - Total: 104,132
  - Density: 13,500/km^{2} (35,100/sq mi)
- Time zone: UTC+6 (BST)
- Postal code: 9202
- Area code: 041
- Website: bangladesh.gov.bd/maps/images/khulna/Daulatpur.gif

Daulatpur Thana (Bengali: দৌলতপুর) is a thana of Khulna District in the Division of Khulna, Bangladesh.

== Geography ==
Daulatpur is located at 22.8875°N 89.5167°E. It has 17097 households and total area 7.69 km^{2}.

== Demographics ==
Religions in Daulatpur Thana (2022)
| Religion | Percent |
| Islam | 87.84% |
| Hinduism | 11.12% |
| Christianity | 1.04% |
| Other or not stated | 0.00% |

According to the 2022 Bangladeshi census, Daulatpur Thana had 27,304 households and a population of 104,132. 7.72% were under 5 years of age. Daulatpur had a literacy rate of 85.11%: 87.21% for males and 82.97% for females, with a sex ratio of 101.99 males per 100 females.

Daulatpur has 2 Unions/Wards, 37 Mauzas/Mahallas, and 0 villages.

== See also ==
- Upazilas of Bangladesh
- Districts of Bangladesh
- Divisions of Bangladesh
