= Nazrul Islam Manju =

Bangladeshi politician

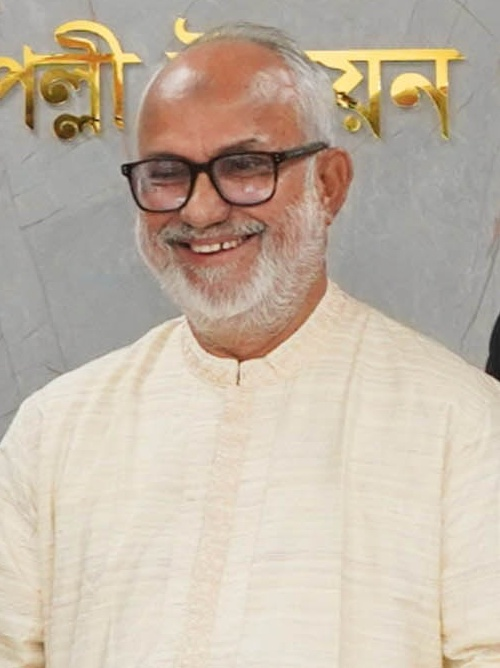
- Manju in 2026

Administrator of Khulna
- Incumbent
- Assumed office 01 March 2026
- Preceded by: Md. Mokhtar Ahmed (Divisional Commissioner)

Member of Parliament
- In office 29 December 2008 – 5 January 2014
- Preceded by: Ali Asgar Lobi
- Succeeded by: Mohammad Mizanur Rahman
- Constituency: Khulna-2

Personal details
- Born: 2 January 1958 (age 68) Khulna, East Pakistan
- Party: Bangladesh Nationalist Party

Nazrul Islam Manju is a Bangladesh Nationalist Party (BNP) politician and a former member of parliament for Khulna-2. He is the current administrator of the Khulna City Corporation.

== Career ==
He was elected to parliament from Khulna-2 as a Bangladesh Nationalist Party candidate in 2009. He was the general secretary of the Khulna District unit of the party and later became the president. He also served as BNP's central organizing secretary and later, lost the position for criticizing top leaders of the party.
