= Khalishpur Thana =

Thana in Khulna City Corporation, Bangladesh

Khalishpur খালিশপুর
- Metropolitan Thana
- Location in Bangladesh Khalishpur (Bangladesh)
- Coordinates: 22°51′N 89°32.2′E
- Country: Bangladesh
- Division: Khulna Division
- District: Khulna District

Area
  - Total: 11.47 km^{2} (4.43 sq mi)

Population (2022)
  - Total: 163,856
  - Density: 14,290/km^{2} (37,000/sq mi)
- Time zone: UTC+6 (BST)
- Postal code: 9300
- Area code: 041
- Website: bangladesh.gov.bd/maps/images/khulna/Khalishpur.gif

Khalishpur (Bengali: খালিশপুর) is a Metropolitan thana of Khulna Metropolitan Police in the Division of Khulna, Bangladesh.

== Geography ==
Khalishpur is located at 22.8500°N 89.5361°E. It has 35343 households and total area 12.35 km^{2}.

== Demographics ==
Religions in Khalishpur Thana (2022)
Religion	Percent
Islam	93.45%
Hinduism	4.97%
Christianity	1.46%
Other or not stated	0.12%

According to the 2022 Bangladeshi census, Khalishpur Thana had 41,888 households and a population of 163,856. 7.82% were under 5 years of age. Khalishpur had a literacy rate of 88.03%: 90.02% for males and 85.96% for females, and a sex ratio of 104.72 males per 100 females.

In the 1991 Bangladesh census, Khalishpur had a population of 173255. Males constituted 55.95% of the population, and females 44.05%. Population over the age of 18 was 96193. Khalishpur had an average literacy rate of 59.8% (7+ years), above the national average of 32.4%.

In the 2011 Census of Bangladesh, the population was 165,299.

== Jute mills in Khalishpur ==
Jute mills in Khalishpur, Khulna formed an important part of the industrial development of Khulna during the mid-20th century. Located along the Bhairab River, the Khalishpur industrial area became a major centre of Bangladesh's jute-processing industry, with several large mills established during the 1950s, including Khalishpur Jute Mills, Crescent Jute Mills, Platinum Jubilee Jute Mills and Star Jute Mills. Khalishpur Jute Mills was established in 1952, Crescent Jute Mills in 1952, Platinum Jubilee Jute Mills in 1954, and Star Jute Mills in 1956. The mills employed thousands of workers and contributed to the growth of surrounding residential areas, markets and other urban infrastructure. Following the nationalization of major industries after the independence of Bangladesh, the mills came under the Bangladesh Jute Mills Corporation (BJMC) in 1972. The jute industry subsequently faced prolonged financial difficulties and increasing competition from synthetic fibres. In July 2020, the government halted production at the state-owned jute mills operated by BJMC, including the major mills in Khalishpur.

== Media ==
The Khulna relay station of Bangladesh Television is situated in Khalishpur.

== See also ==
- Upazilas of Bangladesh
- Districts of Bangladesh
- Divisions of Bangladesh
