= Khulna =

Khulna খুলনা (Bengali)
- Metropolis
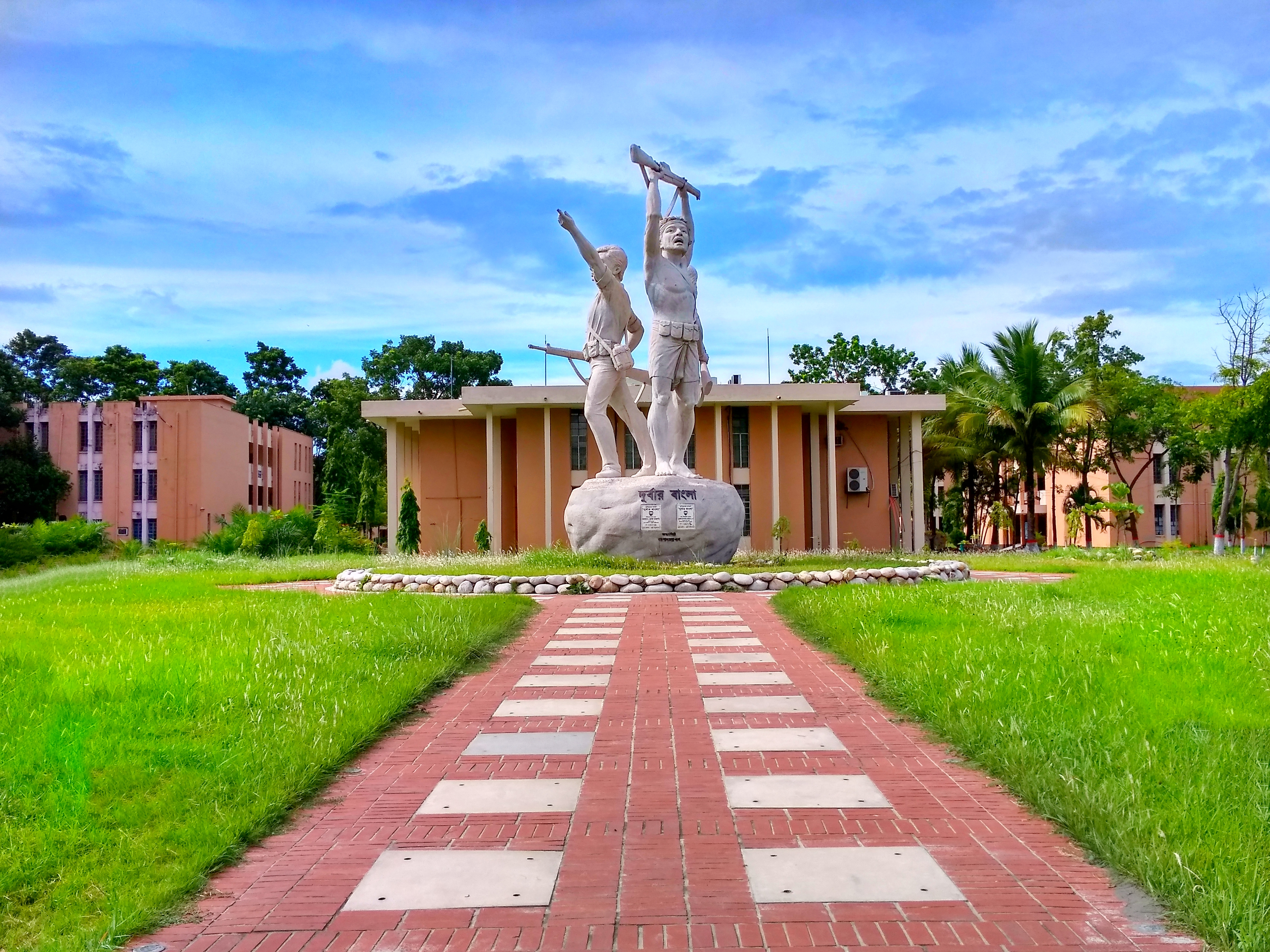
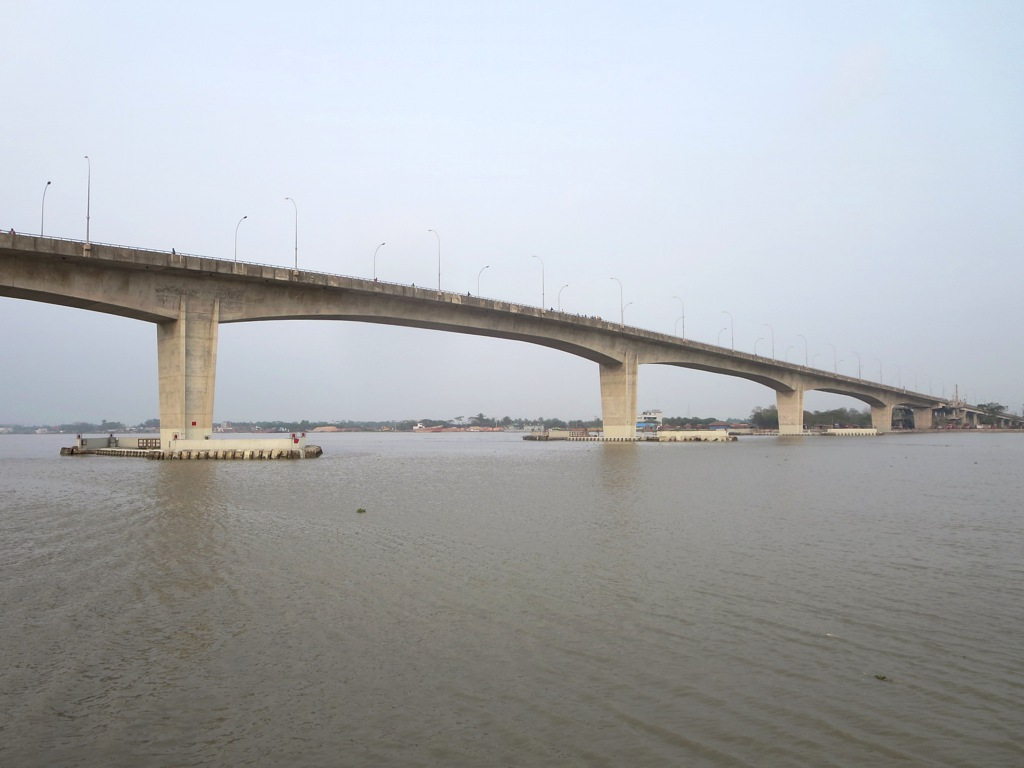
- A monument at the Khulna University of Engineering & Technology Khan Jahan Ali Bridge Skyline of Khulna City
- Interactive map of Khulna
- Location within Khulna division Location within Bangladesh Location within South Asia Location within Asia
- Coordinates: 22.83°N 89.55°E
- Country: Bangladesh
- Division: Khulna Division
- District: Khulna District
- First settled: 25 April 1842; 184 years ago
- Municipal Council: 8 September 1884; 142 years ago
- Municipal Corporation: 12 December 1984; 41 years ago
- City Corporation: 6 August 1990; 36 years ago

Government
  - Type: Mayor-council
  - Body: Khulna City Corporation
  - Administrator: Nazrul Islam Manju
  - City Council: 31 constituencies
  - Parliament: 2 constituencies

Area
  - Metropolis: 45.65 km^{2} (17.63 sq mi)
  - Metro: 150.57 km^{2} (58.14 sq mi)
- Elevation: 9 m (30 ft)

Population (2022)
  - Metropolis: 719,557
  - Rank: 5th in Bangladesh; 3rd (Agglomeration)
  - Density: 15,760/km^{2} (40,820/sq mi)
  - Urban: 998,000
  - Metro: 1,020,000
- Demonym: Khulnaiya

Languages
  - Official: Bengali • English
  - Regional: Eastern Bengali dialects
- Time zone: UTC+6 (Bangladesh Time)
- Postal code: 9000, 9100, 9201, 9202, 9203, 9204, 9205, 9206, 9207, 9208
- Calling code: +880 41
- UN/LOCODE: BD KHL
- GDP (2022): PPP ▲$5.1 billion Nominal ▲$2.0 billion
- HDI (2023): 0.718 high · 2nd of 22
- Police: Khulna Metropolitan Police
- Airport: Jessore Airport & Khan Jahan Ali Airport (Under construction)
- Planning Authority: Khulna Development Authority
- Water Supply and Sewerage Authority: Khulna WASA
- Website: khulna.gov.bd

Khulna (Bengali: খুলনা, pronounced [ˈkʰulna]) is the capital and largest city of Khulna Division and Khulna District in Bangladesh. It is the fifth-largest city in Bangladesh after Dhaka, Chittagong, Gazipur, and Narayanganj, and the third most-populous metropolitan area in the country after Dhaka and Chittagong. It is the divisional centre of 10 districts of Khulna division. Khulna is also the second largest port city of Bangladesh after Chittagong, due to being adjacent to Port of Mongla. There is also a river port within the city named Port of Khulna. Khulna's economy is mainly marine, seaport, and local industry-based, and it is the third-largest in Bangladesh.

Khulna is on the Rupsha and Bhairab River, a strategic industrial point in southwestern Bangladesh. It is also an important industrial hub in Bangladeshi industry, hosting many of the nation's largest companies. Khulna's economy is affected by the Port of Mongla, Bangladesh's second-largest seaport.

A colonial steamboat service, which includes the Tern, Osrich and Lepcha, operates on the river route to the city. Khulna is considered the gateway to the Sundarbans, the world's largest mangrove forest and home of the Bengal tiger. It is north of the Mosque City of Bagerhat, a UNESCO World Heritage Site.

== History ==
Khulna was part of the ancient kingdoms of Vanga, Gangaridai and Samatata. After the end of the Pala Empire, it was ruled by the Sena dynasty during the 12th-century reign of Ballala Sena, and formed part of the Bagri division of Bengal. During the 14th century, Shamsuddin Firoz Shah was the first Muslim ruler to arrive in the city. Muslim settlements increased during the time of Shamsuddin Ilyas Shah, and many mosques and shrines were established. A Muslim saint, Khan Jahan Ali, acquired a jagir (fiefdom) encompassing a large part of Khulna Division from the king of Gauḍa during the 15th century and renamed the region as Jahanabad. Ali ruled until he died in 1459.

After Ali's death, the city became part of the Bengal Sultanate. During the reign of Daud Khan Karrani in the 16th century, Vikramaditya (one of Karrani's chief ministers) obtained a grant in southern Bengal—including Khulna—when Karrani was fighting the Mughals. Vikramaditya established a sovereign kingdom with its capital at Iswaripur (in present-day Satkhira District). He was succeeded by his son, Pratapaditya, who gained preeminence over the Baro-Bhuyans and controlled southern Bengal. Vikramaditya was defeated by Raja Man Singh I, a Hindu Rajput general of the Mughal emperor Akbar, in 1611.

Khulna was ruled by autonomous Bengali nawabs until 1793, when the British East India Company abolished nizamat (local rule) and took control of the city. Becoming part of Jessore District in 1842, it became the headquarters of Khulna District (the Khulna and Bagerhat subdivisions of Jashore District, the Satkhira subdivision of 24 Parganas district, and the Sundarbans) in 1882. Khulna had a pouroshava (municipal council) in 1884, which became a municipal corporation in 1984.

Before 19 August 1947, Khulna District was part of undivided Bengal. Khulna first declared itself part of India in 1947, and the Indian flag was flown on 15 August. Syed Mohammad Abdul Halim (an official of the Bengali civil service) requested Khulna's inclusion in Pakistan, and the boundary commission declared that the city was part of East Bengal. Sher e Bangla A.K.Fazlul Haq, Muslim League leaders Khan A Sabur, Advocate Hamidul Haq Chowdhury, A. F. M. Abdul Jalil, and Abdul Mojid Khan were also involved in the process.

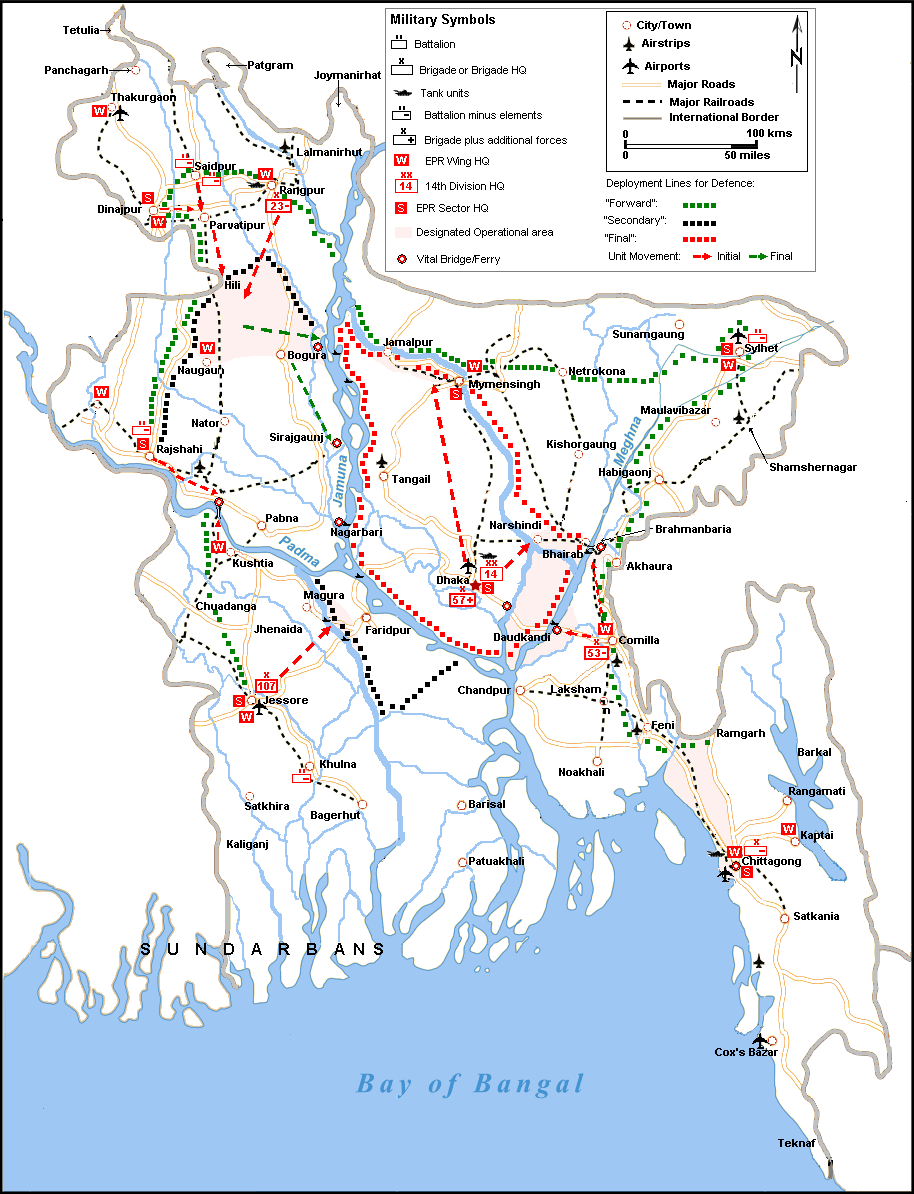
Pakistani Eastern Command plan for the defense of East Pakistan from 1967 to 1971 (generic representation—some unit locations not shown)

During the Bangladesh Liberation War, the Pakistan Army created the 314th ad hoc Brigade to hold Khulna. The city's Mukti Bahini fighters were part of sector 8 under the command of Major Abu Osman Chowdhury and, later, under Major Mohammad Abdul Monjur.

== Geography ==
Khulna is Bangladesh's third-largest city, after Dhaka and Chittagong. It is in the southwestern part of the country, on the Rupsha and Bhairab Rivers. Even though the city corporation area is 45.65 square Kilometres, The total city area covers 150.57 square kilometres (58.14 sq mi), and Khulna District covers 4,394.46 square kilometres (1,696.71 sq mi). Khulna is south of Jessore and Narail District, east of Satkhira District, west of Bagerhat and north of the Bay of Bengal. It is part of the Ganges Delta, the world's largest river delta. Sundarbans, the world's largest mangrove forest, is in the southern part of the delta. Tidal-flat ecosystems are adjacent to the city. Khulna is in the northern part of the district, and the Mayur River is the western boundary of its metropolitan area.

== Climate ==
In the Köppen climate classification, Khulna has a tropical wet and dry climate. The city is hot and humid during summer, and pleasantly warm during winter. Khulna is significantly affected by the Monsoon of South Asia. Khulna gets less rainfall than other parts of Bangladesh due to its location and the effects of the Sundarbans south of the city. Its annual average rainfall is 1,878.4 mm (73.95 in)/h, with about 87 percent falling between May and October. Khulna also receives heavy rain from cyclones which form in the Bay of Bengal. The city has an annual average temperature of 26.3 °C (79.3 °F), with monthly averages ranging from 11.4 °C (52.5 °F) on January mornings to 34.6 °C (94.3 °F) during April afternoons.

Climate data for Khulna (1991–2020 normals, extremes 1921–present)
| Month | Jan | Feb | Mar | Apr | May | Jun | Jul | Aug | Sep | Oct | Nov | Dec | Year |
|---|---|---|---|---|---|---|---|---|---|---|---|---|---|
| Record high °C (°F) | 31.2 (88.2) | 36.2 (97.2) | 43.5 (110.3) | 40.7 (105.3) | 40.7 (105.3) | 39.0 (102.2) | 37.4 (99.3) | 36.5 (97.7) | 37.2 (99.0) | 36.5 (97.7) | 34.5 (94.1) | 30.7 (87.3) | 43.5 (110.3) |
| Mean daily maximum °C (°F) | 25.1 (77.2) | 28.9 (84.0) | 32.9 (91.2) | 34.9 (94.8) | 35.0 (95.0) | 33.5 (92.3) | 32.3 (90.1) | 32.4 (90.3) | 32.7 (90.9) | 32.3 (90.1) | 30.1 (86.2) | 26.4 (79.5) | 31.4 (88.5) |
| Daily mean °C (°F) | 18.1 (64.6) | 22.0 (71.6) | 26.5 (79.7) | 29.2 (84.6) | 29.8 (85.6) | 29.5 (85.1) | 28.9 (84.0) | 29.0 (84.2) | 28.8 (83.8) | 27.7 (81.9) | 24.1 (75.4) | 19.6 (67.3) | 26.1 (79.0) |
| Mean daily minimum °C (°F) | 12.4 (54.3) | 16.0 (60.8) | 20.9 (69.6) | 24.3 (75.7) | 25.5 (77.9) | 26.4 (79.5) | 26.4 (79.5) | 26.4 (79.5) | 26.1 (79.0) | 24.3 (75.7) | 19.5 (67.1) | 14.4 (57.9) | 21.9 (71.4) |
| Record low °C (°F) | 6.4 (43.5) | 9.0 (48.2) | 12.5 (54.5) | 16.0 (60.8) | 19.4 (66.9) | 19.2 (66.6) | 22.2 (72.0) | 22.2 (72.0) | 21.5 (70.7) | 18.3 (64.9) | 13.0 (55.4) | 8.0 (46.4) | 6.4 (43.5) |
| Average precipitation mm (inches) | 14 (0.6) | 37 (1.5) | 39 (1.5) | 62 (2.4) | 179 (7.0) | 311 (12.2) | 369 (14.5) | 320 (12.6) | 285 (11.2) | 151 (5.9) | 35 (1.4) | 6 (0.2) | 1,808 (71.2) |
| Average precipitation days (≥ 1 mm) | 1 | 3 | 3 | 6 | 11 | 17 | 23 | 21 | 17 | 9 | 2 | 1 | 114 |
| Average relative humidity (%) | 78 | 74 | 73 | 76 | 79 | 85 | 87 | 86 | 87 | 84 | 80 | 79 | 81 |
| Mean monthly sunshine hours | 220.1 | 229.7 | 254.2 | 249.6 | 237.2 | 157.5 | 137.7 | 146.9 | 160.0 | 216.6 | 234.5 | 217.8 | 2,461.8 |
Source 1: NOAA
Source 2: Bangladesh Meteorological Department (humidity 1981–2010)

== Administration ==
Khulna Municipal Council was founded on 12 December 1884. It became a municipal corporation in 1984 and a city corporation in 1990. Khulna City Corporation (KCC) is a self-governing corporation run by an elected mayor, who governs the city's 31 wards.

The Khulna Metropolitan Police (KMP) maintains law and order and regulates traffic in the metropolitan area. It has eight police stations: Khulna Kotwali Thana, Sonadanga Thana, Khalishpur Thana, Daulatpur Thana, Khan Jahan Ali Thana, Aranghata Thana, Harintana Thana and Labanchara Thana. The Metropolitan Magistrate Court (CMM) adjudicates the city's legal issues. The Khulna Development Authority (KDA) plans and coordinates the city's development. Khulna Water Supply & Sewerage Authority (KWASA) parallels the KCC.

Khulna city area has two parliamentary seats. They are

- Khulna-2
- Khulna-3

=== Military ===
Khulna is one of two principal naval command centers for the Bangladesh Navy. The BNS Titumir naval base is in the city. Jahanabad Cantonment, containing the Army Service Corps Center and School (ASCC&S), is situated in the Gilatola area of the Khulna metropolitan area.

Also, Khulna Shipyard is a renowned military naval Institute in the Khulna region

== Demographics ==
Historical population

| Year | Pop. | ±% p.a. |
|---|---|---|
| 1991 | 578,919 | — |
| 2001 | 770,498 | +2.90% |

| Year | Pop. | ±% p.a. |
|---|---|---|
| 2011 | 663,342 | −1.49% |
| 2022 | 719,557 | +0.74% |

As of the 2022 census, Khulna City Corporation had 188,579 households and a population of 719,557. 14.97% of the population was under 10 years of age. Khulna had a literacy rate of 88.07% for those 7 years and older and a sex ratio of 102.91 males per 100 females.

In the 2011 census, Khulna City Corporation had a population of 751,237 in 177,852 households. Khulna had a sex ratio of 923 females to 1000 males and a literacy rate of 72.7%.

Like the rest of Bangladesh, most of the city's population is Bengali. Khulna's native residents are known as Khulnaiya. Its population also consists of people from neighboring districts.

Most residents speak Bengali (the national language), its dialects, and regional languages. English is understood by a large segment of the population, especially in business. An Urdu-speaking population, descendants of Muslims displaced from Bihar in 1947 who sought refuge in East Bengal, lives in the city's Khalishpur area.

Religions in Khulna city (2022)
| Religion | Percent |
| Islam | 89.06% |
| Hinduism | 9.86% |
| Christianity | 1.04% |
| Other or not stated | 0.02% |

Islam is Khulna's major religion, practiced by 89.06% of the population. Other religions are Hinduism (practiced by 9.86%) and Christianity (1.04%).

== Education ==
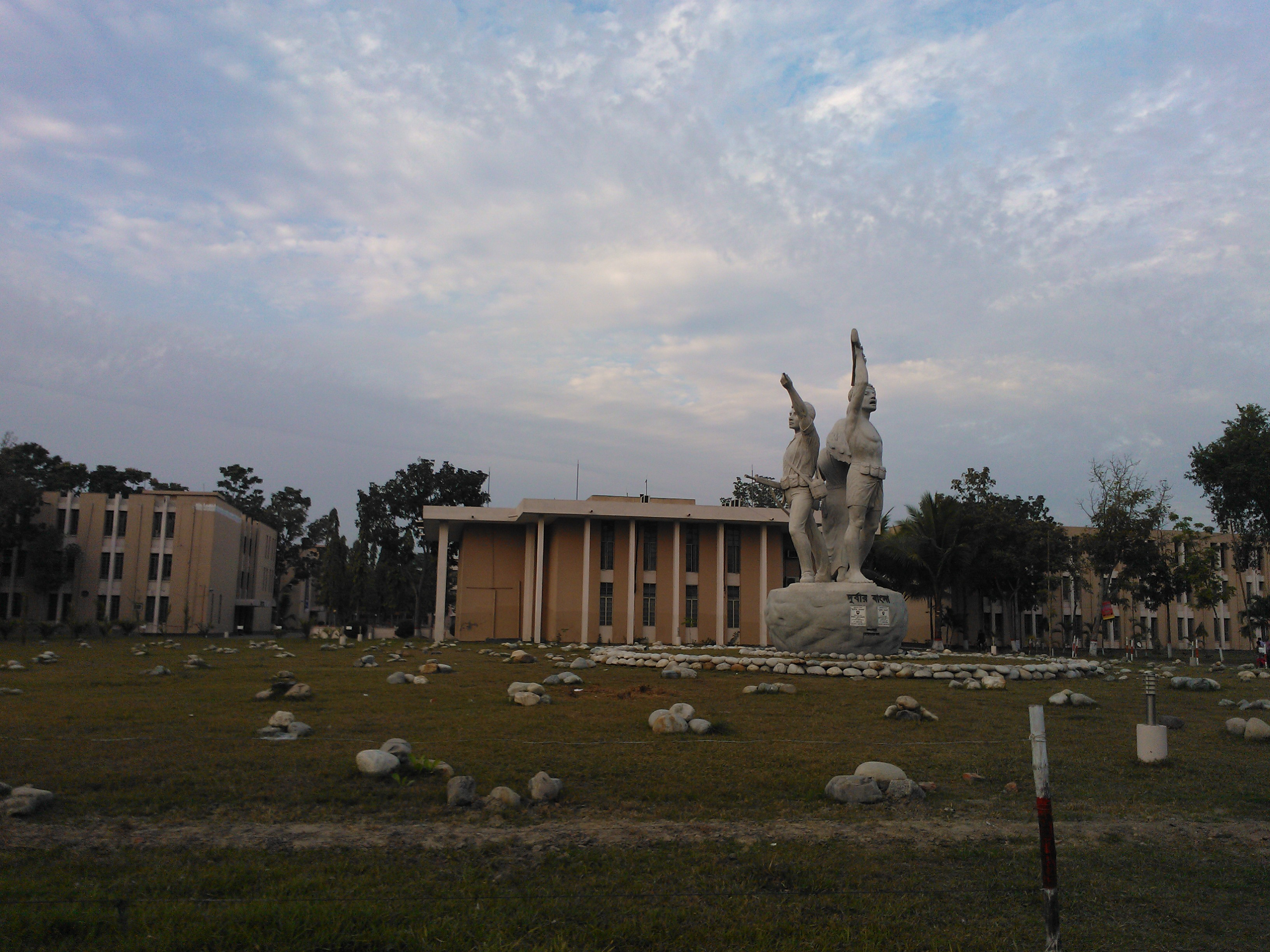
Bangladesh Liberation War statue at the Khulna University of Engineering & Technology

Khulna University building

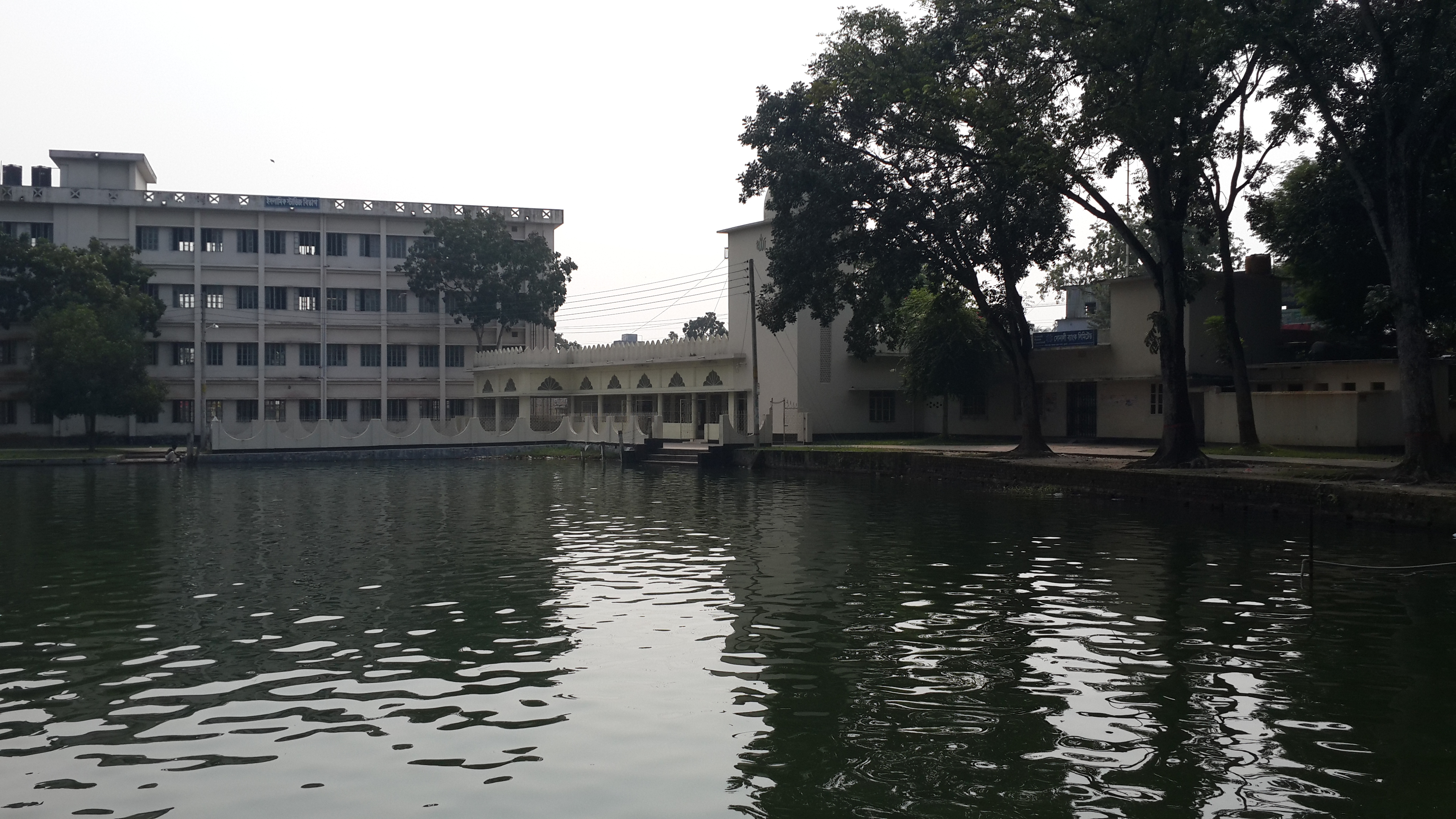
Brajalal College pond

Educational institutions in the city include Khulna University of Engineering & Technology (KUET). The university, earlier known as Bangladesh Institute of Technology, Khulna, is the only engineering university in Khulna and was listed in the 2019 edition of QS Asian University Rankings. Brajalal College, founded in 1902, is the city's oldest higher-education institution. Khulna University is the only public university in Bangladesh where student politics is prohibited. There is also an agriculture university, named Khulna Agricultural University (KAU) was founded in 2019. Khulna Medical University and Khulna Medical College (KMC) are public medical institutions, while North Western University, Bangladesh (NWU) and the Northern University of Business & Technology (NUBT) and Khan Bahadur Ahsanullah University, these universities are private. High schools in Khulna include:

- Khulna Zilla School.
- Govt. Laboratory High School, Khulna.
- Govt. Model High School, Khulna.
- St. Joseph's High School, Khulna.
- Govt. Model School and College, Boyra, Khulna.
- Khulna Collectorate Public School & College
- Khulna Public School and College.

== Sports ==
Cricket and football are the two most popular sports in Khulna, and the Khulna Division cricket team's home ground is in the city. Khulna's cricket Bangladesh Premier League team, the Khulna Titans, was formerly the Khulna Royal Bengals. The Khulna Abahani Club played in the Bangladesh Football Premier League for several seasons before its relegation in the 2008–09 season.

Sheikh Abu Naser Stadium, the city's international sports venue (hosting test cricket, One Day International and Twenty20 International matches), became Bangladesh's seventh test-cricket venue on 21 November 2012; it also hosts several Bangladesh Premier League matches. Khulna District Stadium hosts other domestic sports and cultural events.

== Media ==
Print media include the Daily Purbanchal, Daily Janmabhumi, Daily Shomoyer Khobor and Dakhinanchal Protidin. The Daily Tribune is the only English-language newspaper. Electronic media include the Khulna Gazette, Protidin Shebok, Shomoyer Khobor. Radio stations are Bangladesh Betar Khulna, Radio Today (89.6 MHz), Radio Foorti (88.0), and Radio Khulna FM (88.8).

=== Television ===
State-owned Bangladesh Television has a relay station in the Khalishpur Thana of Khulna, established in 1977. There have been several attempts to convert it into a full-fledged television station, but this has not been successful to date. Privately owned Ekushey Television, which formerly broadcast on terrestrial, had a station in Khulna which broadcast on VHF channel 8 as of August 2002.

== Tourism ==
The Sundarbans, in Khulna District, is home to the Bengal tiger and the world's largest virgin mangrove forest. It is a UNESCO World Heritage Site. The Mosque City of Bagerhat, in Bagerhat District about 15 miles (24 km) south-east of Khulna, is also a World Heritage Site.

Rabindra Complex is in the village of Dakkhindihi, 19 kilometres (12 mi) from Khulna. Tagore visited the home of Rabindranath Tagore's father-in-law, Beni Madhab Roy Chowdhury, several times. The museum has been renovated and is administered by Bangladesh's Department of Archaeology. The Khulna Divisional Museum, founded in 1998, was established by the country's Department of Archaeology.

== Notable residents ==
- Khan A Sabur – Politician
- Prafulla Chandra Ray – Chemist
- Sheikh Razzak Ali – Lawyer, politician, deputy speaker, and speaker of the Jatiyo Sangsad
- Tanvir Mokammel – Filmmaker and writer
- Firoz Mahmud- Visual artist and painter
- Nilima Ibrahim – Educationist, littérateur and social worker
- Prafulla Chandra Sen – Former West Bengal chief minister
- Sheikh Abu Naser – Politician
- Nazrul Islam Manju – Politician
- Talukder Abdul Khaleque – Politician
- Rudra Mohammad Shahidullah – Poet
- Qazi Imdadul Haq – Writer
- Humayun Kabir Balu – Renowned journalist, Freedom fighter, and Ekushey Padak winner in journalism
- SM Shafiuddin Ahmed – 17th Chief of Army Staff (CAS) of Bangladesh Army
- Sheikh Salahuddin – Former cricketer
- Bishnu Chattopadhyay – Freedom fighter and peasant leader
- Abdur Razzak – Cricketer
- Manjural Islam Rana – Cricketer
- Popy (Sadia Parvin Popy) – Actress, model
- Moushumi (Arifa Pervin Moushumi) – Actress, model
- Salma Khatun – Cricketer
- Rumana Ahmed – Cricketer
- Mehedi Hasan – Cricketer
- Bibhuti Roy – Engineer
- Puja Cherry Roy – Actress
- Afif Hossain – Cricketer
- Nurul Hasan Sohan – Cricketer
- Ayasha Rahman – Cricketer
- Tahin Tahera – Cricketer
- Shakil Ahmed – Sports shooter
- Md. Rafiqul Islam - Editor/ Secretary General: Parliament Watch
- Ziaur Rahman – Cricketer
- Amit Majumder, Cricketer
- Sheikh Mohammad Aslam, Footballer
- Abdus Salam Murshedy, Footballer, Politician
- Mamun Joarder, Footballer
- Kazi Jasimuddin Ahmed Joshi – Footballer
Prafulla Chandra Ray

Sheikh Razzak Ali meeting with Queen Elizabeth II

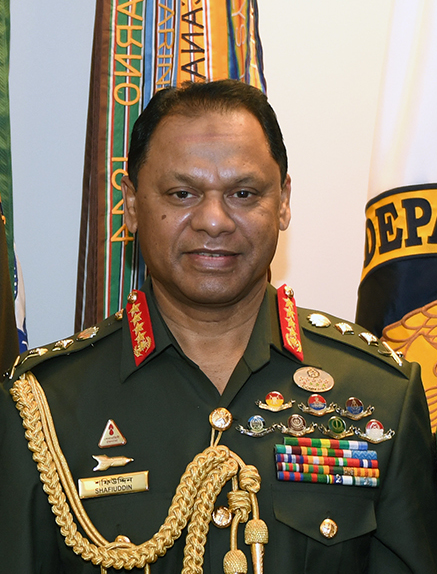
General SM Shafiuddin Ahmed

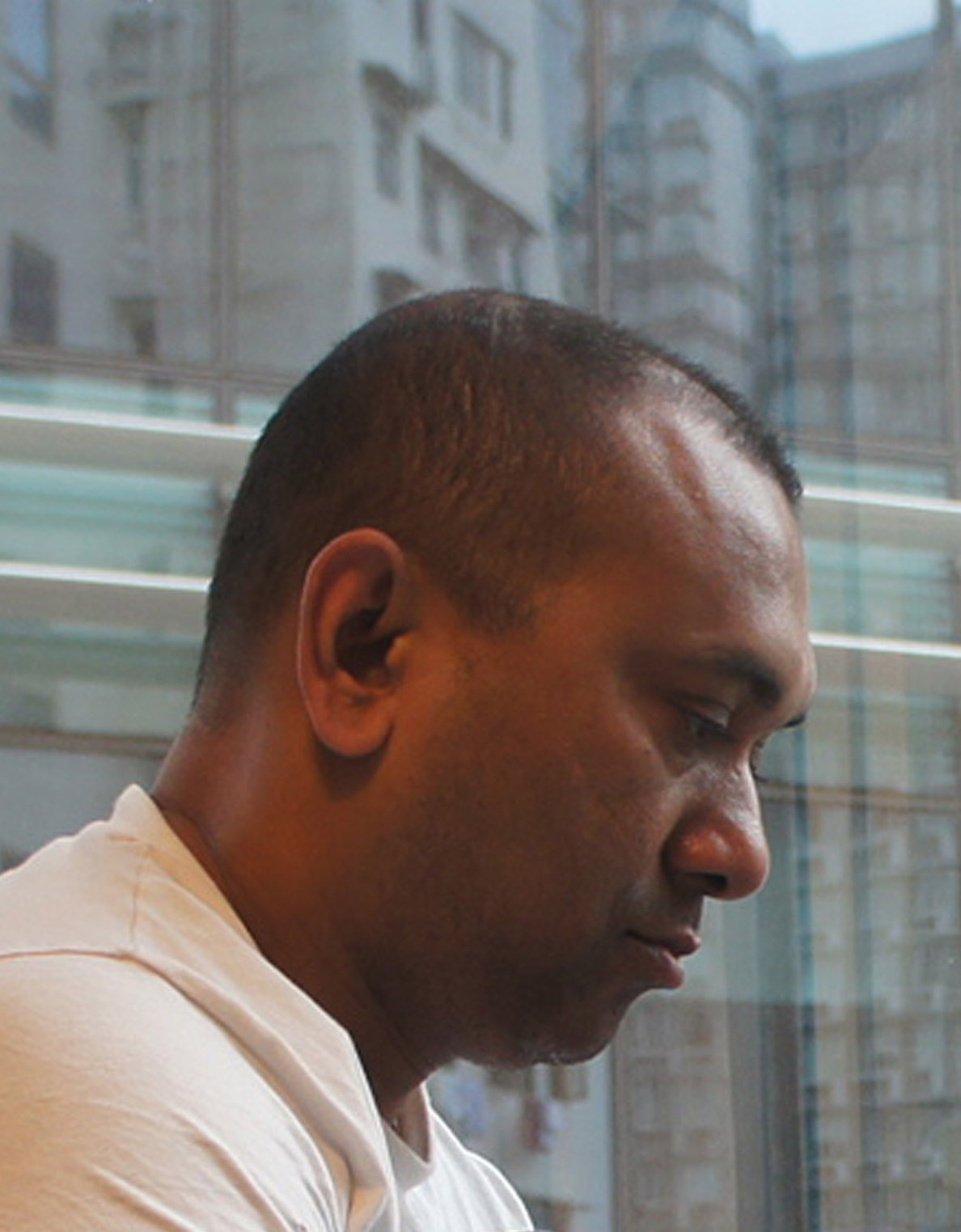
Firoz Mahmud

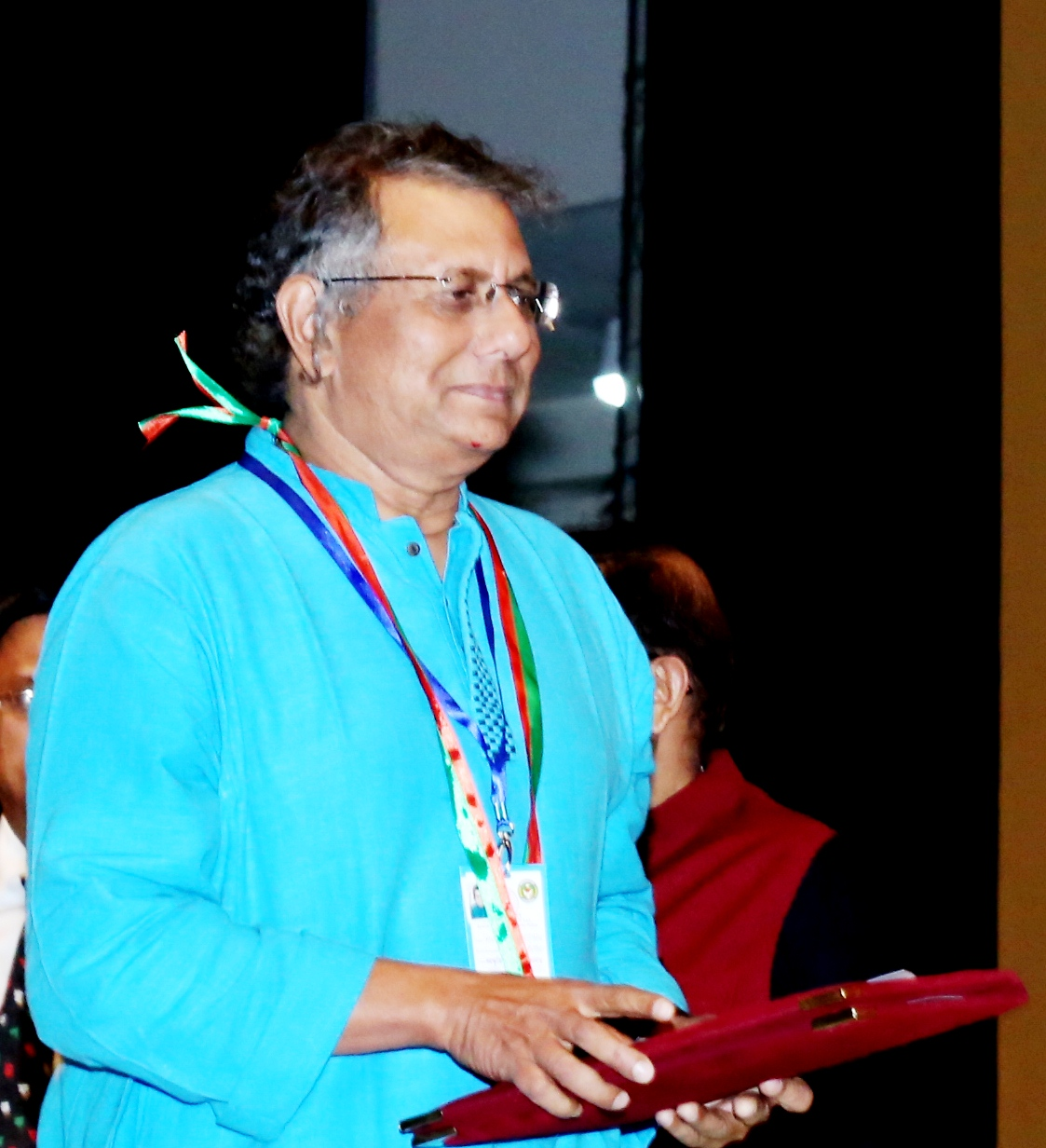
Tanvir Mokammel

== See also ==
- Upazilas of Bangladesh
- Districts of Bangladesh
- Divisions of Bangladesh
- Upazila
- Thana
