= Khan Jahan Ali Thana =

Thana in Khulna City Corporation, Bangladesh

Khan Jahan Ali Thana খানজাহান আলী থানা
- Metropolitan Thana
- Location in Bangladesh Khan Jahan Ali Thana (Bangladesh)
- Coordinates: 22°55.2′N 89°28.8′E
- Country: Bangladesh
- Division: Khulna Division
- District: Khulna District

Area
  - Total: 33.07 km^{2} (12.77 sq mi)

Population (2022)
  - Total: 7,450
  - Density: 2,681/km^{2} (6,940/sq mi)
- Time zone: UTC+6 (BST)
- Postal code: 9100
- Area code: 041

Khan Jahan Ali Thana (Bengali: খানজাহান আলী থানা) is a Metropolitan Thana of Khulna Metropolitan Police in the Division of Khulna, Bangladesh.

== Geography ==
Khan Jahan Ali is located at 22.9208°N 89.4792°E . It has 17373 households and total area 33.07 km^{2}.

== Demographics ==
Religions in Khan Jahan Ali Thana (2022)
Religion	Percent
Islam	96.51%
Hinduism	3.28%
Other or not stated	0.21%

According to the 2022 Bangladeshi census, Khan Jahan Ali Thana had 1,719 households and a population of 7,450. 7.10% were under 5 years of age. Khan Jahan Ali had a literacy rate of 88.46%: 91.85% for males and 83.97% for females, with a sex ratio of 129.58 males per 100 females.

As of the 1991 Bangladeshi census, Khan Jahan Ali has a population of 88659. Males constitute 55.39% of the population, and females 44.61%. This Upazila's eighteen up population is 49323. Khan Jahan Ali has an average literacy rate of 53% (7+ years), and a national average of 32.4% literate.

== Administration ==
Khan Jahan Ali has 2 Unions/Wards, 26 Mauzas/Mahallas, and 1 village named Pariardanga.

== Famous Institutions ==
=== Armed and Civilian Forces Base ===
- Jahanabad Cantonment
- 3rd Armed Police Battalion
- Khulna Zilla Police Lines
- Khulna Range Reserve Force Police Lines
- Regimental Headquarter, Sundarban Regiment, Bangladesh National Cadet Corps

=== Universities ===
- Khulna University of Engineering & Technology
- Bangladesh Army University of Science & Technology, Khulna

== See also ==
- Upazilas of Bangladesh
- Districts of Bangladesh
- Divisions of Bangladesh
