= Md. Moniruzzaman Moni =

Bangladeshi politician

- এম ডি. মনিরুজ্জামান মনি

4th Mayor of Khulna
- In office 22 November 2016 – 18 May 2018
- Preceded by: Anisur Rahaman Biswas (In Charge)
- Succeeded by: Talukder Abdul Khaleque
- In office 25 September 2013 – 2 November 2015
- Preceded by: Ajmal Ahmed (In charge)
- Succeeded by: Anisur Rahman Biswas (In Charge)
- In office 20 November 2007 – 13 September 2008
- Preceded by: Sheikh Tayebur Rahman
- Succeeded by: Talukder Abdul Khaleque

Personal details
- Born: Khulna, East Pakistan
- Party: Bangladesh Nationalist Party
- Occupation: politician

Md. Moniruzzaman Moni (Bengali: এম ডি. মনিরুজ্জামান মনি) is a Bangladeshi politician and mayor of the Khulna City Corporation. He is currently serving as the chairman of the KWASA

== Career ==
On 15 July 2008, Moni lost the Khulna mayoral election to Talukder Abdul Khaleque.

Moni was elected mayor of Khulna in June 2013 as a candidate of the Bangladesh Nationalist Party. He beat Awami League candidate and incumbent mayor Talukdar Abdul Khaleque.

On 2 November 2015, Moni was suspended from the post of mayor of Khulna by the Ministry of Local Government, Rural Development and Co-operatives. This decision was taken after two criminal cases were filed against Moni. Around the same time, the government also suspended Ariful Haque Choudhury, mayor of Sylhet; Mosaddek Hossain Bulbul, mayor of Rajshahi; and M. A. Mannan, mayor of Gazipur. The suspension was based on criminal cases from 2014. On 22 November 2015, the Bangladesh High Court upheld his suspension order.
