= Sonadanga Model Thana =

Thana in Khulna City Corporation, Bangladesh

Sonadanga
- Upazila
- Location in Bangladesh Sonadanga (Bangladesh)
- Coordinates: 22°49′N 89°33′E
- Country: Bangladesh
- Division: Khulna Division
- District: Khulna District

Area
  - Total: 8.42 km^{2} (3.25 sq mi)

Population (2022)
  - Total: 195,899
  - Density: 23,300/km^{2} (60,300/sq mi)
- Time zone: UTC+6 (BST)
- Postal code: 9100
- Area code: 041
- Website: bangladesh.gov.bd/maps/images/khulna/Sonadanga.gif

Sonadanga (Bengali: সোনাডাঙ্গা) is an Upazila of Khulna District in the Division of Khulna, Bangladesh.

== Etymology ==
The term "Sonadanga" etymologically means "golden marshland".

== Geography ==
Sonadanga is located at 22.8167°N 89.5500°E. It has 51,971 households and total area 8.42 km^{2}.

== Demographics ==
Religions in Sonadanga Thana (2022)
Religion	Percent
Islam	90.17%
Hinduism	9.11%
Christianity	0.71%
Other or not stated	0.01%

According to the 2022 Bangladeshi census, Sonadanga Thana had 51,971 households and a population of 195,899. 7.81% were under 5 years of age. Sonadanga had a literacy rate of 89.24%: 91.15% for males and 87.35% for females, with a sex ratio of 99.93 males per 100 females.

Most of the Sonadanga inhabitants are local who are living here for generations. There are also a number of people who comes from other part of the country. Most of them are from other parts of Khulna division. The inhabitants are mostly Muslim. There is a Christian missionary located in Sonadanga. A noticeable number of Christian people live around that missionary which made Sonadanga one of the most Christian populated area. in Khulna City.

== Places ==
The most noticeable place of Sonadanga is the Bus terminal. That is the busiest bus terminal in Khulna division where they operate a large number of buses that travel between various districts in Bangladesh. The second noticeable place is the "New Market", a market which is more than 50 years old and still called "new". There is a Christian missionary in Shonadanga that is famous for various charitable activities specially for almost free medical treatment offered by foreign doctors. The missionary have two Churches, and one school named "St. Johns School". There is a Mosque complex (Baitun Noor) where they have a large Mosque building with a market in the ground floor. There is a modern supermarket named "Safe & Save" just opposite to "New market. Sonadanga residential area is a huge residential project by KDA (Khulna Development Authority) an autonomous body. That residential aria have a few schools in it. The oldest school in that area is "Khulna Collegiate School". There is also a newly established Private University in Sonadanga (North Western University, Khulna). City Inn, is the only three star hotel located in Sonadanga.

== Administration ==
Sonadanga has 6 Unions/Wards, 31 Mauzas/Mahallas, and 0 villages.

== See also ==
- Upazilas of Bangladesh
- Districts of Bangladesh
- Divisions of Bangladesh
