= Thanas of Bangladesh =

Administrative unit in Bangladesh

A thana (precinct) (Bengali: থানা, romanized: thânâ, lit. 'police station') serves as a fundamental administrative unit in Bangladesh, functioning as a city district governed by a police station (analogous to a police district or a police precinct).

In rural areas, the thana system, originating in the 18th century under British rule, served as a sub-district, overseen by a Thana Council during the East Pakistan period. However, starting in 1982, each thana was redesignated as an upazila (lit. 'sub-district') headed by an Upazila Council with provisions for semi-autonomous local administration.

== History ==
The term "thana" was introduced via a regulation issued on 7 November 1792 by the government of the Bengal Presidency. District magistrates were instructed to partition their respective districts into police jurisdictions termed as "thanas." Initially, a thana solely served as a police jurisdiction led by a junior police officer, typically the officer-in-charge (OC).

In 1959, under Ayub Khan's rule, Bangladesh (then East Pakistan) underwent a division into four-tiered electoral units in the rural areas. From bottom to top, these units were the Union Council, Thana Council, District Council, and Divisional Council. A Thana Council had both elected representatives and ex officio members. Its primary role was to coordinate the activities of Union Councils within its jurisdiction.

Following further restructuring of the rural local government system after independence, on 23 December 1982, the Local Government (Thana Parishad and Thana Administration Reorganisation) Ordinance was enacted, bringing significant changes to the system of local governance at the thana level. In this re-organised framework, the thana became the focal point of administration, with the Thana Parishad assuming responsibility for all development activities at the local level. However, the national government retained direct responsibility for regulatory functions and major development activities of national and regional significance. Subsequently, in 1983, the Local Government Ordinance of 1982 was amended to re-designate and elevate the existing thanas as upazilas (sub-districts), with provisions for semi-autonomous local governance. After being reinstated in 1992, in 1993, the Thana Development Coordination Committee was formed as a governing body for such thanas and replaced sub-district councils, the thana system was reverted back to the upazila system in 1999 however thanas under the jurisdiction of city corporations continue to have administrative significance.

In contemporary usage, the term "thana" specifically denotes police precincts and their respective police stations. Typically, each upazila is associated with one thana. However, larger administrative entities like city corporations might have multiple thanas, each overseeing different areas, serving as both a city district and a police district. In the 2022 census, each thana under a city corporation was considered as a separate census unit.

== See also ==
- Upazila, successor to thana
- Gram Police Bahini
- Village Defence Party
- Bangladesh Police
- Administrative geography of Bangladesh
