= Metropolitan Police (Bangladesh) =

Unit of the Bangladesh Police

Metropolitan Police is a subnational formation of Bangladesh Police. There are eight commissionerates in eight metropolis areas in Bangladesh. This establishment was formed in 1976 after establishing Dhaka Metropolitan Police.

== Commissionerates ==
- Existing Commissionerates
  - Dhaka Metropolitan Police
  - Chattogram Metropolitan Police
  - Khulna Metropolitan Police
  - Rajshahi Metropolitan Police
  - Barishal Metropolitan Police
  - Sylhet Metropolitan Police
  - Rangpur Metropolitan Police
  - Gazipur Metropolitan Police
- Proposed Commissionerates
  - Mymensingh Metropolitan Police
  - Narayanganj Metropolitan Police
  - Cumilla Metropolitan Police
  - Bogura Metropolitan Police
