= Talukder Abdul Khaleque =

Bangladeshi politician

- তালুকদার আব্দুল খালেক
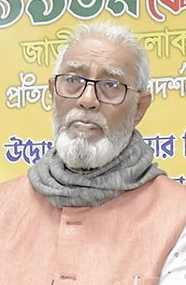
- Khaleque in 2024

5th Mayor of Khulna
- In office 20 May 2018 – 19 August 2024
- Preceded by: Md. Moniruzzaman Moni
- Succeeded by: Md. Helal Mahmud Sharif; as Administrator
- In office 14 September 2008 – 9 June 2013
- Preceded by: Md. Moniruzzaman Moni
- Succeeded by: Azmal Ahmed; as In-Charge

Member of the Bangladesh Parliament for Bagerhat-3
- In office 14 January 2014 – 5 May 2018
- Preceded by: Habibun Nahar
- Succeeded by: Habibun Nahar
- In office 12 June 1996 – 29 October 2006
- Preceded by: AU Ahmed
- Succeeded by: Habibun Nahar
- In office 27 February 1991 – 15 February 1996
- Preceded by: Aftab Uddin Howlader
- Succeeded by: AU Ahmed

Personal details
- Born: 1 June 1952 (age 74) Bagerhat, East Pakistan
- Party: Bangladesh Awami League
- Spouse: Habibun Nahar

Talukder Abdul Khaleque is a Bangladeshi politician. He has served as mayor of the Khulna City Corporation for three terms and is a former member of parliament.

== Career ==
Abdul Khaleque served as a member of parliament from Bagerhat-3 in 1991 as a Awami League candidate. On 23 January 2003, he was sued by the Bureau of Anti-corruption for providing government contracts to his own company.

In August 2008, Abdul Khaleque was elected mayor of Khulna.

Abdul Khaleque ran for the Khulna City Corporation on 27 May 2013. He lost to Md. Moniruzzaman Moni, the Bangladesh Nationalist Party candidate. In June 2013, there was a question on him in an exam in Pioneer Secondary Girls School. The school said they bought the question paper from Printing Press. He went on to be elected to parliament from Bagerhat-3 on 5 January 2014.

Abdul Khaleque was elected to parliament from Bagerhat-3 in 2018 but resigned to contest the Khulna City Corporation election. He was re-elected as mayor of KCC on 15 May 2018. He denied any irregularities in the election at a press conference in the Khulna Press Club on 16 May. He took charge on 25 September 2018.

Abdul Khaleque announced a 504.31 core taka budget for Khulna City Corporation in 2020. He is the President of Khulna unit of Awami League. He filed a case under the Digital Security Act against Khulna journalist Abu Tyeb for a Facebook post he made. Tyeb was arrested on 21 April 2021 under the case. On 13 May 2021, Tyeb was released on bail.

He become the mayor for the third time in Khulna City Corporation (KCC) 2023 elections. He has secured 154,825 votes. His nearest competitor Bangladesh Islami Andolan's Abdul Awal received 60,064 votes.

Following the Non-cooperation movement (2024), Abdul Khaleque and most of Khulna's 41 councillors went into hiding on 9 August, causing a paralysis of the city government's functions due to his failure to appoint a substitute.

== Personal life ==
Abdul Khaleque's wife Habibun Nahar is the former member of parliament from Bagerhat-3. She was elected unopposed.
