= Union councils of Bagerhat District =

Union councils of Bagerhat District (Bengali: বাগেরহাট জেলার ইউনিয়ন পরিষদসমূহ) are the smallest rural administrative and local government units in Satkhira District of Bangladesh. The district consists of 2 municipalities, 9 upazilas, 79 union porishods and 1047 villages.

== Bagerhat Sadar Upazila ==
Bagerhat Sadar has 10 Wards/Unions, 187 Mauzas/Mahallas, and 167 villages.

- Karapara Union
- Bamorta Union
- Gotapara Union
- Bishnapur Union
- Baruipara Union
- Jatrapur Union
- Satgambuj Union
- Khanpur Union
- Rakhalgachi Union
- Dema Union

== Fakirhat Upazila ==
Fakirhat has 8 Unions/Wards, 67 Mauzas/Mahallas, and 87 villages.

- Betaga Union
- Lakhpur Union
- Piljang Union
- Fakirhat Union
- Bahirdia Mansa Union
- Naldha Mauvhog Union
- Mulghar Union
- Suvhadia Union

== Mollahat Upazila ==
Mollahat Thana was established in 1967 and was turned into an upazila in 1983. It consists of 7 union parishads, 58 mouzas and 102 villages.

- Udoypur Union
- Chunkhola Union
- Gangni Union
- Kulia Union
- Gaola Union
- Kodalia Union
- Atjuri Union

== Kachua Upazila ==
Kachua has 7 Unions/Wards, 78 Mauzas/Mahallas, and 96 villages.

- Gojalia Union
- Dhopakhali Union
- Moghia Union
- Kachua Union
- Gopalpur Union
- Raripara Union
- Badhal Union

== Chitalmari Upazila ==
Chitalmari thana was turned into an upazila in 1983. Chitalmari has 7 unions/wards, 58 mouzas/mahallas, and 121 villages.

- Barobaria Union
- Kalatala Union
- Hizla Union
- Shibpur Union
- Chitalmari Union
- Charbaniari Union
- Shantoshpur Union

== Morrelganj Upazila ==
Morrelganj Upazila has 16 unions, 1 municipality, 122 Mauzas/Mahallas, and 184 villages.

- Teligati Union
- Panchakaran Union
- Putikhali Union
- Daibagnyahati Union
- Ramchandrapur Union
- Chingrakhali Union
- Hoglapasha Union
- Banagram Union
- Balaibunia Union
- Hoglabunia Union
- Baharbunia Union
- Jiudhara Union
- Nishanbaria Union
- Baraikhali Union
- Morrelganj Union
- Khaulia Union

== Rampal Upazila ==
Rampal has 11 Unions/Wards, 140 Mauzas/Mahallas, and 149 villages.

- Gouramva Union
- Uzalkur Union
- Baintala Union
- Rampal Union
- Rajnagar Union
- Hurka Union
- Perikhali Union
- Vojpatia Union
- Mollikerber Union
- Banshtoli Union

== Mongla Upazila ==
Mongla thana was established in 1976 and was turned into an upazila in 1983. It consists of 1 municipality, 7 union parishads, 37 mouzas and 77 villages.

- Burirdanga Union
- Mithakhali Union
- Sonailtala Union
- Chandpai Union
- Chila Union
- Sundarban Union

== Sarankhola Upazila ==
Sarankhola has 4 Unions/Wards, 11 Mauzas/Mahallas, and 44 villages.

- Dhansagor Union
- Khontakata Union
- Rayenda Union
- Southkhali Union
