= Morrelganj Union =

Morrelganj Union মোড়েলগঞ্জ ইউনিয়ন
- Union
- Morrelganj Union
- Country: Bangladesh
- Division: Khulna
- District: Bagerhat
- Upazila: Morrelganj

Area
  - Total: 41.36 km^{2} (15.97 sq mi)

Population (2011)
  - Total: 12,530
  - Density: 302.9/km^{2} (784.6/sq mi)
- Time zone: UTC+6 (BST)
- Website: morrelganjup.bagerhat.gov.bd

Morrelganj Union (Bengali: মোড়েলগঞ্জ ইউনিয়ন) is a Union Parishad under Morrelganj Upazila of Bagerhat District in the division of Khulna, Bangladesh. It has an area of 41.36 km2 (15.97 sq mi) and a population of 12,530.

== Villages ==
1. Gabtala
2. Kathaltala
3. Vaijora
4. Badurtala
5. Bisharighata
6. Purbo Saralia
7. Paschim Saralia
8. Uttar Saralia
9. Bahrbuniya Union

== Notable people ==
- Shahid Rahimullah, leader of Indigo Revolt
- Liakat Ali Khan, student freedom fighter commander in 1971
- Mohammad Ruhul Amin, Police Superintendent in Charge of the region in 1996 who helped clean-up river pirates in the Mongla rivers to practically zero
