= Khuriakhali =

Village in Bangladesh

Coordinates: 22°14′N 89°50′E

Khuriakhali is a village in Dakhin Khali Union, Sarankhola Upazila of Bagerhat District, on the northeastern edge of the Sundarbans forest in Bangladesh. According to the 2011 Bangladesh census, the village had 752 households and a population of 3,277. The populace consists of a majority of Muslims and a small minority of Hindus. Sarankhola is the mauza (small group of adjoining villages) that includes Khuriakhali.
