= Kulia Union =

Kulia Union may refer to:

- Kulia Union, Mollahat, a union in Mollahat Upazila
- Kulia Union, Debhata, a union in Debhata Upazila
