= Baiddyamari =

Coordinates: 22°24′2.8″N 89°39′39.4″E

Baiddyamari is a small village located in the Mongla Upazila of Bagerhat District, Bangladesh.

== Flora and fauna ==
The surrounding area has tigers. Circa 2007, a woman in Baiddyamari was attacked and killed by a tiger. Tigers have also killed livestock in the village at various times, such as cattle and goats.

== See also ==
- List of villages in Bangladesh
- Sundarbans
