= Chandpai Union =

Chandpai Union চাঁদপাই ইউনিয়ন
- Union
- Chandpai Union
- Country: Bangladesh
- Division: Khulna
- District: Bagerhat
- Upazila: Mongla

Area
  - Total: 53.22 km^{2} (20.55 sq mi)

Population (2011)
  - Total: 17,662
  - Density: 331.9/km^{2} (859.5/sq mi)
- Time zone: UTC+6 (BST)
- Website: chadpaiup.jessore.gov.bd

Chandpai Union (Bengali: চাঁদপাই ইউনিয়ন) is a Union parishad of Mongla Upazila, Bagerhat District in Khulna Division of Bangladesh. It has an area of 53.22 km2 (20.55 sq mi) and a population of 17,662.
