= Ramchandrapur Union, Morrelganj =

Ramchandrapur Union রামচন্দ্রপুর ইউনিয়ন
- Union
- Ramchandrapur Union
- Country: Bangladesh
- Division: Khulna
- District: Bagerhat
- Upazila: Morrelganj

Area
  - Total: 62.16 km^{2} (24.00 sq mi)

Population (2011)
  - Total: 21,430
  - Density: 344.8/km^{2} (892.9/sq mi)
- Time zone: UTC+6 (BST)
- Website: ramchandrapurup.bagerhat.gov.bd

Ramchandrapur Union (Bengali: রামচন্দ্রপুর ইউনিয়ন) is a Union Parishad under Morrelganj Upazila of Bagerhat District in the division of Khulna, Bangladesh. It has an area of 62.16 km2 (24.00 sq mi) and a population of 21,430.
