= Rampal Union, Rampal =

Gouramva Union রামপাল ইউনিয়ন
- Union
- Rampal Union
- Country: Bangladesh
- Division: Khulna
- District: Bagerhat
- Upazila: Rampal

Area
  - Total: 33.23 km^{2} (12.83 sq mi)

Population (2011)
  - Total: 27,353
  - Density: 823.1/km^{2} (2,132/sq mi)
- Time zone: UTC+6 (BST)
- Website: rampalup.bagerhat.gov.bd

Rampal Union (Bengali: রামপাল ইউনিয়ন) is a Union Parishad under Rampal Upazila of Bagerhat District in the division of Khulna, Bangladesh. It has an area of 33.23 km2 (12.83 sq mi) and a population of 27,353.
