= Baharbunia Union =

Union in Khulna, Bangladesh

Baharbunia Union বহরবুনিয়া ইউনিয়ন
- Union
- Baharbunia Union
- Location within Bangladesh
- Coordinates: 22.4995°N 89.7845°E
- Country: Bangladesh
- Division: Khulna
- District: Bagerhat
- Upazila: Morrelganj

Area
  - Total: 69.93 km^{2} (27.00 sq mi)

Population (2011)
  - Total: 25,145
  - Density: 359.6/km^{2} (931.3/sq mi)
- Time zone: UTC+6 (BST)
- Website: baharbuniaup.bagerhat.gov.bd

Baharbunia Union (Bengali: বহরবুনিয়া ইউনিয়ন) is a union parishad under Morrelganj Upazila of Bagerhat District in Khulna Division, Bangladesh. It has an area of 69.93 km2 (27.00 sq mi) and a population of 25,145 (2011).
