= Khaulia Union =

Union in Khulna, Bangladesh

Khaulia Union খাউলিয়া ইউনিয়ন
- Union
- Khaulia Union
- Country: Bangladesh
- Division: Khulna
- District: Bagerhat
- Upazila: Morrelganj

Area
  - Total: 41.44 km^{2} (16.00 sq mi)

Population (2011)
  - Total: 27,841
  - Density: 671.8/km^{2} (1,740/sq mi)
- Time zone: UTC+6 (BST)
- Website: khauliaup.bagerhat.gov.bd

Khaulia Union (Bengali: খাউলিয়া ইউনিয়ন) is a Union Parishad in Morrelganj Upazila of Bagerhat District, Khulna Division, Bangladesh. It has an area of 41.44 km2 (16.00 sq mi) and a population of 27,841.
