= Nishanbaria Union, Morrelganj =

Union in Khulna, Bangladesh

Teligati Union তেলিগাতী ইউনিয়ন
- Union
- Nishanbaria Union
- Country: Bangladesh
- Division: Khulna
- District: Bagerhat
- Upazila: Morrelganj

Area
  - Total: 102.02 km^{2} (39.39 sq mi)

Population (2011)
  - Total: 36,658
  - Density: 359.32/km^{2} (930.64/sq mi)
- Time zone: UTC+6 (BST)
- Website: nishanbariaup.bagerhat.gov.bd

Nishanbaria Union (Bengali: তেলিগাতী ইউনিয়ন) is a Union Parishad in Morrelganj Upazila of Bagerhat District in the division of Khulna, Bangladesh. It has an area of 102.02 km2 (39.39 sq mi) and a population of 36,658.
