= Balaibunia Union =

Union in Khulna, Bangladesh

Balaibunia Union বলইবুনিয়া ইউনিয়ন
- Union
- Balaibunia Union
- Country: Bangladesh
- Division: Khulna
- District: Bagerhat
- Upazila: Morrelganj
- Established: 1962

Area
  - Total: 19.42 km^{2} (7.50 sq mi)

Population (2011)
  - Total: 17,599
  - Density: 906.2/km^{2} (2,347/sq mi)
- Time zone: UTC+6 (BST)
- Website: balaibuniaup.bagerhat.gov.bd

Balaibunia Union (Bengali: বলইবুনিয়া ইউনিয়ন) is a Union Parishad under Morrelganj Upazila of Bagerhat District in Khulna Division, Bangladesh. It has an area of 9.42 km2 (7.50 sq mi) and a population of 17,599.
