= Southkhali Union =

Union in Khulna, Bangladesh

Southkhali Union সাউথখালী ইউনিয়ন
- Union
- Dhansagor Union
- Country: Bangladesh
- Division: Khulna
- District: Bagerhat
- Upazila: Sarankhola

Area
  - Total: 95.05 km^{2} (36.70 sq mi)

Population (2011)
  - Total: 29,100
  - Density: 306/km^{2} (793/sq mi)
- Time zone: UTC+6 (BST)
- Website: southkhaliup.jessore.gov.bd

Southkhali Union (Bengali: সাউথখালী ইউনিয়ন) is a union parishad of Sarankhola Upazila, Bagerhat District in Khulna Division of Bangladesh. It has an area of 95.05 km2 (36.70 sq mi) and a population of 29,100.
