= Gangni Union, Mollahat =

Gangni Union গাংনী ইউনিয়ন
- Union
- Gangni Union
- Location within Bangladesh
- Country: Bangladesh
- Division: Khulna
- District: Bagerhat
- Upazila: Mollahat
- Established: 1961

Area
  - Total: 40.20 km^{2} (15.52 sq mi)

Population (2011)
  - Total: 20,608
  - Density: 512.6/km^{2} (1,328/sq mi)
- Time zone: UTC+6 (BST)
- Website: gangniup.jessore.gov.bd

Gangni Union (Bengali: উদয়পুর ইউনিয়ন) is a union parishad of Mollahat Upazila, Bagerhat District in Khulna Division of Bangladesh. This union has an area of 40.20 km2 (15.52 sq mi) and a population of 20,608.
