= Hoglabunia Union =

Union in Khulna, Bangladesh

Hoglabunia Union হোগলাবুনিয়া ইউনিয়ন
- Union
- Hoglabunia Union
- Country: Bangladesh
- Division: Khulna
- District: Bagerhat
- Upazila: Morrelganj

Area
  - Total: 82.23 km^{2} (31.75 sq mi)

Population (2011)
  - Total: 23,030
  - Density: 280.1/km^{2} (725.4/sq mi)
- Time zone: UTC+6 (BST)
- Website: hoglabuniaup.bagerhat.gov.bd

Hoglabunia Union (Bengali: হোগলাবুনিয়া ইউনিয়ন) is a Union Parishad under Morrelganj Upazila of Bagerhat District in Khulna Division, Bangladesh. It has an area of 82.23 km2 (31.75 sq mi) and a population of 23,030.
