= Gaola Union =

Gaola Union গাওলা ইউনিয়ন
- Union
- Gaola Union
- Location within Bangladesh
- Country: Bangladesh
- Division: Khulna
- District: Bagerhat
- Upazila: Mollahat
- Established: 1974

Area
  - Total: 98.74 km^{2} (38.12 sq mi)

Population (2011)
  - Total: 19,586
  - Density: 198.4/km^{2} (513.7/sq mi)
- Time zone: UTC+6 (BST)
- Website: gaolaup.jessore.gov.bd

Gaola Union (Bengali: গাওলা ইউনিয়ন) is a union parishad of Mollahat Upazila, Bagerhat District in Khulna Division of Bangladesh. The union has an area of 98.74 km2 (38.12 sq mi) and a population of 19,586.
