= Dhansagor Union =

Union in Khulna, Bangladesh

Dhansagor Union ধানসাগর ইউনিয়ন
- Union
- Dhansagor Union
- Country: Bangladesh
- Division: Khulna
- District: Bagerhat
- Upazila: Sarankhola

Area
  - Total: 89.15 km^{2} (34.42 sq mi)

Population (2011)
  - Total: 19,417
  - Density: 217.8/km^{2} (564.1/sq mi)
- Time zone: UTC+6 (BST)
- Website: dhanshagorup.jessore.gov.bd

Dhansagor Union (Bengali: ধানসাগর ইউনিয়ন) is a union parishad of Sarankhola Upazila, Bagerhat District in Khulna Division of Bangladesh. The union has an area of 89.15 km2 (34.42 sq mi) and a population of 19,417.
