= Sundarban Union, Mongla =

Union in Khulna, Bangladesh

Sundarban Union সুন্দরবন ইউনিয়ন
- Union
- Sundarban Union
- Country: Bangladesh
- Division: Khulna
- District: Bagerhat
- Upazila: Mongla

Area
  - Total: 92.07 km^{2} (35.55 sq mi)

Population (2011)
  - Total: 18,217
  - Density: 197.9/km^{2} (512.5/sq mi)
- Time zone: UTC+6 (BST)
- Website: sundarbanup.jessore.gov.bd

Sundarban Union (Bengali: বুড়িরডাঙ্গা ইউনিয়ন) is a union parishad of Mongla Upazila, Bagerhat District in Khulna Division of Bangladesh. The union has an area of 92.07 km2 (35.55 sq mi) and a population of 18,217.
