= Banagram Union, Morrelganj =

Banagram Union বনগ্রাম ইউনিয়ন
- Union
- Banagram Union
- Location within Bangladesh
- Coordinates: 22.6013°N 89.9173°E
- Country: Bangladesh
- Division: Khulna
- District: Bagerhat
- Upazila: Morrelganj
- Established: 1962

Area
  - Total: 45.48 km^{2} (17.56 sq mi)

Population (2011)
  - Total: 14,539
  - Density: 319.7/km^{2} (828.0/sq mi)
- Time zone: UTC+6 (BST)
- Website: balaibuniaup.bagerhat.gov.bd

Banagram Union (Bengali: বনগ্রাম ইউনিয়ন) is a union parishad under Morrelganj Upazila of Bagerhat District in the division of Khulna, Bangladesh. It has an area of 45.48 km2 (17.56 sq mi) and a population of 14,539.

== Villages ==
1. Baharboula
2. Banagram
3. Sripur
4. Daskhali
5. Bishkhali
6. Kandarpur
7. Kathipara
8. Balbhadrapur
9. Abeta
10. Mohanpur
11. Choto Karaboula
12. Putia
13. Jhantipur
14. Karaboula
15. Jaipur
