= Gojalia Union, Kachua =

Gojalia Union গজালিয়া ইউনিয়ন
- Union
- Gojalia Union
- Country: Bangladesh
- Division: Khulna
- District: Bagerhat
- Upazila: Kachua

Area
  - Total: 56.41 km^{2} (21.78 sq mi)

Population (2011)
  - Total: 19,279
  - Density: 341.8/km^{2} (885.2/sq mi)
- Time zone: UTC+6 (BST)
- Website: gojaliaup.jessore.gov.bd

Gojalia Union (Bengali: গজালিয়া ইউনিয়ন) is a Union parishad of Kachua Upazila, Bagerhat District in Khulna Division of Bangladesh. It has an area of 56.41 km2 (21.78 sq mi) and a population of 19,279.
