= Baraikhali Union =

Union in Khulna, Bangladesh

Baraikhali Union বাড়ৈখালী ইউনিয়ন
- Union
- Baraikhali Union
- Location within Bangladesh
- Coordinates: 22.4582°N 89.8355°E
- Country: Bangladesh
- Division: Khulna
- District: Bagerhat
- Upazila: Morrelganj

Area
  - Total: 72.80 km^{2} (28.11 sq mi)

Population (2011)
  - Total: 5,006
  - Density: 68.76/km^{2} (178.1/sq mi)
- Time zone: UTC+6 (BST)
- Website: baraikhaliup.bagerhat.gov.bd

Baraikhali Union (Bengali: বাড়ৈখালী ইউনিয়ন) is a union parishad under Morrelganj Upazila of Bagerhat District in the division of Khulna, Bangladesh. It has an area of 72.80 km2 (28.11 sq mi) and a population of 2,869.
