= Panchakaran Union =

Panchakaran Union পঞ্চকরণ ইউনিয়ন
- Union
- Panchakaran Union
- Country: Bangladesh
- Division: Khulna
- District: Bagerhat
- Upazila: Morrelganj

Area
  - Total: 72.86 km^{2} (28.13 sq mi)

Population (2011)
  - Total: 21,009
  - Density: 288.3/km^{2} (746.8/sq mi)
- Time zone: UTC+6 (BST)
- Website: panchakaranup.bagerhat.gov.bd

Panchakaran Union (Bengali: পঞ্চকরণ ইউনিয়ন) is a union parishad under Morrelganj Upazila of Bagerhat District in the division of Khulna, Bangladesh. It has an area of 72.86 km^{2} (28.13 sq mi) and a population of 21,009.
