= Sarankhola =

Coordinates: 22.3132°N 89.8535°E

Sarankhola is a mauza (a small group of villages) in Dakhin Khali Union, Sarankhola Upazila of Bagerhat District, on the northeastern edge of the Sundarbans forest in Bangladesh. According to the 2011 Bangladesh census, the mauza had 2,902 households and a population of 11,623. The populace consists of a majority of Muslims and a small minority of Hindus. Khuriakhali is one of the five villages within the mauza.

== See also ==
- List of villages in Bangladesh
