= Shibpur Union =

Shibpur Union may refer to:

- Shibpur Union, Chitalmari, a union council in Chitalmari Upazila, Bagerhat District, Bangladesh
- Shibpur Union, Satkhira Sadar, a union council in Satkhira Sadar Upazila, Satkhira District, Bangladesh
