= Hoglapasha Union =

Union in Khulna, Bangladesh

Hoglapasha Union হোগলাপাশা ইউনিয়ন
- Union
- Hoglapasha Union
- Country: Bangladesh
- Division: Khulna
- District: Bagerhat
- Upazila: Morrelganj

Area
  - Total: 44.03 km^{2} (17.00 sq mi)

Population (2011)
  - Total: 18,939
  - Density: 430.1/km^{2} (1,114/sq mi)
- Time zone: UTC+6 (BST)
- Website: hoglapashaup.bagerhat.gov.bd

Hoglapasha Union (Bengali: হোগলাপাশা ইউনিয়ন) is a Union Parishad under Morrelganj Upazila of Bagerhat District in the division of Khulna, Bangladesh. It has an area of 44.03 km^{2} (17.00 sq mi) and a population of 18,939.
