= Chunkhola Union =

Chunkhola Union চুনখোলা ইউনিয়ন
- Union
- Chunkhola Union
- Location within Bangladesh
- Country: Bangladesh
- Division: Khulna
- District: Bagerhat
- Upazila: Mollahat

Area
  - Total: 67.08 km^{2} (25.90 sq mi)

Population (2011)
  - Total: 15,782
  - Density: 235.3/km^{2} (609.3/sq mi)
- Time zone: UTC+6 (BST)
- Website: chunkholaup.jessore.gov.bd

Chunkhola Union (Bengali: চুনখোলা ইউনিয়ন) is a Union parishad of Mollahat Upazila, Bagerhat District in Khulna Division of Bangladesh. It has an area of 67.08 km2 (25.90 sq mi) and a population of 15,782.
