= Chingrakhali Union =

Union in Khulna, Bangladesh

Chingrakhali Union চিংড়াখালী ইউনিয়ন
- Union
- Chingrakhali Union
- Country: Bangladesh
- Division: Khulna
- District: Bagerhat
- Upazila: Morrelganj

Area
  - Total: 17.28 km^{2} (6.67 sq mi)

Population (2011)
  - Total: 29,001
  - Density: 1,678/km^{2} (4,347/sq mi)
- Time zone: UTC+6 (BST)
- Website: chingrakhaliup.bagerhat.gov.bd

Chingrakhali Union (Bengali: চিংড়াখালী ইউনিয়ন) is a Union Parishad in Morrelganj Upazila of Bagerhat District in Khulna Division, Bangladesh. It has an area of 17.28 km2 (6.67 sq mi) and a population of 29,001.
