= Atjuri Union =

Atjuri Union আটজুড়ী ইউনিয়ন
- Union
- Atjuri Union
- Location within Bangladesh
- Country: Bangladesh
- Division: Khulna
- District: Bagerhat
- Upazila: Mollahat
- Established: 1960

Area
  - Total: 47.63 km^{2} (18.39 sq mi)

Population (2011)
  - Total: 26,230
  - Density: 550.7/km^{2} (1,426/sq mi)
- Time zone: UTC+6 (BST)
- Website: atjuriup.jessore.gov.bd

Atjuri Union (Bengali: আটজুড়ী ইউনিয়ন) is a union parishad of Mollahat Upazila, Bagerhat District in Khulna Division of Bangladesh. The Atjuri union has an area of 47.63 km2 (18.39 sq mi) and a population of 26,230.
