= Khontakata Union =

Union in Khulna, Bangladesh

Khontakata Union খোন্তাকাটা ইউনিয়ন
- Union
- Khontakata Union
- Country: Bangladesh
- Division: Khulna
- District: Bagerhat
- Upazila: Sarankhola

Area
  - Total: 38.85 km^{2} (15.00 sq mi)

Population (2011)
  - Total: 42,402
  - Density: 1,091/km^{2} (2,827/sq mi)
- Time zone: UTC+6 (BST)
- Website: khontakataup.jessore.gov.bd

Khontakata Union (Bengali: খোন্তাকাটা ইউনিয়ন) is a union parishad of Sarankhola Upazila, Bagerhat District in Khulna Division of Bangladesh. It spans an area of 38.85 km2 (15.00 sq mi) and has a population of 42,402.
