= Kachua Union, Kachua =

Kachua Union কচুয়া ইউনিয়ন
- Union
- Kachua Union
- Country: Bangladesh
- Division: Khulna
- District: Bagerhat
- Upazila: Kachua

Area
  - Total: 26.06 km^{2} (10.06 sq mi)

Population (2011)
  - Total: 30,790
  - Density: 1,182/km^{2} (3,060/sq mi)
- Time zone: UTC+6 (BST)
- Website: kachuaup.jessore.gov.bd

Kachua Union (Bengali: কচুয়া ইউনিয়ন) is a Union parishad of Kachua Upazila, Bagerhat District in Khulna Division of Bangladesh. It has an area of 26.06 km^{2} (10.06 sq mi) and a population of 30,790.
