= Putikhali Union =

Putikhali Union পুটিখালী ইউনিয়ন
- Union
- Putikhali Union
- Country: Bangladesh
- Division: Khulna
- District: Bagerhat
- Upazila: Morrelganj

Area
  - Total: 22.35 km^{2} (8.63 sq mi)

Population (2011)
  - Total: 22,666
  - Density: 1,014/km^{2} (2,627/sq mi)
- Time zone: UTC+6 (BST)
- Website: putikhaliup.bagerhat.gov.bd

Putikhali Union (Bengali: পুটিখালী ইউনিয়ন) is a Union Parishad under Morrelganj Upazila of Bagerhat District in the division of Khulna, Bangladesh. It has an area of 22.35 km2 (8.63 sq mi) and a population of 22,666.
