= Udoypur Union, Mollahat =

Udoypur Union উদয়পুর ইউনিয়ন
- Union
- Udoypur Union
- Location within Bangladesh
- Country: Bangladesh
- Division: Khulna
- District: Bagerhat
- Upazila: Mollahat

Area
  - Total: 53.66 km^{2} (20.72 sq mi)

Population (2011)
  - Total: 19,807
  - Density: 369.1/km^{2} (956.0/sq mi)
- Time zone: UTC+6 (BST)
- Website: udoypurup.jessore.gov.bd

Udoypur Union (Bengali: উদয়পুর ইউনিয়ন) is a union parishad of Mollahat Upazila, Bagerhat District in Khulna Division of Bangladesh. It has an area of 53.66 km2 (20.72 sq mi) and a population of 19,807.
