= Jiudhara Union =

Jiudhara Union জিউধরা ইউনিয়ন
- Union
- Jiudhara Union
- Country: Bangladesh
- Division: Khulna
- District: Bagerhat
- Upazila: Morrelganj

Area
  - Total: 50.50 km^{2} (19.50 sq mi)

Population (2011)
  - Total: 23,226
  - Density: 459.9/km^{2} (1,191/sq mi)
- Time zone: UTC+6 (BST)
- Website: jiudharaup.bagerhat.gov.bd

Jiudhara Union (Bengali: জিউধরা ইউনিয়ন) is a Union Parishad under Morrelganj Upazila of Bagerhat District in Khulna Division, Bangladesh. It has an area of 50.50 km2 (19.50 sq mi) and a population of 23,226.
