= Burirdanga Union =

Union in Khulna, Bangladesh

Burirdanga Union বুড়িরডাঙ্গা ইউনিয়ন
- Union
- Burirdanga Union
- Country: Bangladesh
- Division: Khulna
- District: Bagerhat
- Upazila: Mongla

Area
  - Total: 48.95 km^{2} (18.90 sq mi)

Population (2011)
  - Total: 14,623
  - Density: 298.7/km^{2} (773.7/sq mi)
- Time zone: UTC+6 (BST)
- Website: burrirdanggaup.jessore.gov.bd

Burirdanga Union (Bengali: বুড়িরডাঙ্গা ইউনিয়ন) is a Union parishad of Mongla Upazila, Bagerhat District in Khulna Division of Bangladesh. It has an area of 48.95 km2 (18.90 sq mi) and a population of 14,623.
