= Raripara Union =

Raripara Union রাড়ীপাড়া ইউনিয়ন
- Union
- Raripara Union
- Country: Bangladesh
- Division: Khulna
- District: Bagerhat
- Upazila: Kachua

Area
  - Total: 55.32 km^{2} (21.36 sq mi)

Population (2011)
  - Total: 19,279
  - Density: 348.5/km^{2} (902.6/sq mi)
- Time zone: UTC+6 (BST)
- Website: rariparaup.jessore.gov.bd

Raripara Union (Bengali: রাড়ীপাড়া ইউনিয়ন) is a Union parishad of Kachua Upazila, Bagerhat District in Khulna Division of Bangladesh. It has an area of 55.32 km2 (21.36 sq mi) and a population of 19,101.
