= Kachua Upazila =

Kachua Upazila may refer to:

- Kachua Upazila, Bagerhat
- Kachua Upazila, Chandpur
