= Badhal Union =

Badhal Union বাধাল ইউনিয়ন
- Union
- Badhal Union
- Country: Bangladesh
- Division: Khulna
- District: Bagerhat
- Upazila: Kachua

Area
  - Total: 52.11 km^{2} (20.12 sq mi)

Population (2011)
  - Total: 17,875
  - Density: 343.0/km^{2} (888.4/sq mi)
- Time zone: UTC+6 (BST)
- Website: badhalup.jessore.gov.bd

Badhal Union (Bengali: বাধাল ইউনিয়ন) is a Union parishad of Kachua Upazila, Bagerhat District in Khulna Division of Bangladesh. It has an area of 52.11 km2 (20.12 sq mi) and a population of 17,875.
