= Moghia Union =

Moghia Union মঘিয়া ইউনিয়ন
- Union
- Moghia Union
- Country: Bangladesh
- Division: Khulna
- District: Bagerhat
- Upazila: Kachua

Area
  - Total: 21.68 km^{2} (8.37 sq mi)

Population (2011)
  - Total: 16,444
  - Density: 758.5/km^{2} (1,964/sq mi)
- Time zone: UTC+6 (BST)
- Website: moghiaup.jessore.gov.bd

Moghia Union (Bengali: উদয়পুর ইউনিয়ন) is a Union parishad of Kachua Upazila, Bagerhat District in Khulna Division of Bangladesh. It has an area of 21.68 km2 (8.37 sq mi) and a population of 16,444.
