= Dhopakhali Union, Kachua =

Dhopakhali Union ধোপাখালী ইউনিয়ন
- Union
- Dhopakhali Union
- Country: Bangladesh
- Division: Khulna
- District: Bagerhat
- Upazila: Kachua

Area
  - Total: 40.38 km^{2} (15.59 sq mi)

Population (2011)
  - Total: 16,495
  - Density: 408.5/km^{2} (1,058/sq mi)
- Time zone: UTC+6 (BST)
- Website: dhopakhaliup.jessore.gov.bd

Dhopakhali Union (Bengali: ধোপাখালী ইউনিয়ন) is a union parishad of Kachua Upazila, Bagerhat District in Khulna Division of Bangladesh. It has an area of 40.38 km2 (15.59 sq mi) and a population of 16,495.
