= Sonailtala Union =

Sonailtala Union সোনাইলতলা ইউনিয়ন
- Union
- Sonailtala Union
- Country: Bangladesh
- Division: Khulna
- District: Bagerhat
- Upazila: Mongla

Area
  - Total: 39.00 km^{2} (15.06 sq mi)

Population (2011)
  - Total: 9,854
  - Density: 252.7/km^{2} (654.4/sq mi)
- Time zone: UTC+6 (BST)
- Website: sonailtalaup.jessore.gov.bd

Sonailtala Union (Bengali: বুড়িরডাঙ্গা ইউনিয়ন) is a union parishad of Mongla Upazila, Bagerhat District in Khulna Division of Bangladesh. It has an area of 39.00 km2 (15.06 sq mi) and a population of 9,854.
