= Mongla Bandar Secondary School =

Location
- Mongla, 9351; Bangladesh
- Coordinates: 22°32′38.42″N 89°32′44.93″E

Information
- School type: Autonomous Primary and Secondary
- Established: 1987
- Founder: Mongla Port Authority
- Status: active
- School board: Jashore Education Board
- School code: 115025
- Chairman: Rear Admiral Riazuddin Ahmed
- Chairperson: Chairman, MPA
- Director: Md. Nurul Islam
- Headmaster: Yunus Ali Mollah
- Grades: from the baby to 10th
- Gender: Male
- Age: 5 to 16
- Language: Bengali
- Classrooms: 20
- Colours: red, white
- Slogan: Allah give me the wisdom

Mongla Bandar Secondary School is a public school in Mongla Upazila of Bagerhat District, Bangladesh. The school is run by the local authority of Mongla Port. The teaching staff of Mongla Bandar includes teachers with over 20 years of experience and is operated by headmaster Yunus.

== History ==
When founded in 1987, the school had three hundred students, most of whom were children of port employees. The school gradually became the cultural center of Mongla. Mongla Bandar was initially a college. It then a secondary school program. The first name of this school was Mongla Port School and College.
