= Rayenda Union =

Union in Khulna, Bangladesh

Rayenda Union রায়েন্দা ইউনিয়ন
- Union
- Rayenda Union
- Country: Bangladesh
- Division: Khulna
- District: Bagerhat
- Upazila: Sarankhola

Area
  - Total: 87.28 km^{2} (33.70 sq mi)

Population (2011)
  - Total: 34,495
  - Density: 395.2/km^{2} (1,024/sq mi)
- Time zone: UTC+6 (BST)
- Website: rayendaup.jessore.gov.bd

Rayenda Union (Bengali: ধানসাগর ইউনিয়ন) is a Union parishad of Sarankhola Upazila, Bagerhat District in Khulna Division of Bangladesh. It has an area of 87.28 km2 (33.70 sq mi) and a population of 34,495.
