= Gopalpur Union, Kachua =

Gopalpur Union গোপালপুর ইউনিয়ন
- Union
- Gopalpur Union
- Country: Bangladesh
- Division: Khulna
- District: Bagerhat
- Upazila: Kachua

Area
  - Total: 20.72 km^{2} (8.00 sq mi)

Population (2011)
  - Total: 14,246
  - Density: 687.5/km^{2} (1,781/sq mi)
- Time zone: UTC+6 (BST)
- Website: gopalpurup.jessore.gov.bd

Gopalpur Union (Bengali: গোপালপুর ইউনিয়ন) is a union parishad of Kachua Upazila, Bagerhat District in Khulna Division of Bangladesh. Gopalpur Union has an area of 20.72 km^{2} (8.00 sq mi) and a population of 14,246.
