= Kodalia Union =

Kodalia Union কোদালিয়া ইউনিয়ন
- Union
- Kodalia Union
- Location within Bangladesh
- Country: Bangladesh
- Division: Khulna
- District: Bagerhat
- Upazila: Mollahat
- Established: 1971

Area
  - Total: 78.17 km^{2} (30.18 sq mi)

Population (2011)
  - Total: 18,073
  - Density: 231.2/km^{2} (598.8/sq mi)
- Time zone: UTC+6 (BST)
- Website: kodaliaup.jessore.gov.bd

Kodalia Union (Bengali: কোদালিয়া ইউনিয়ন) is a Union parishad of Mollahat Upazila, Bagerhat District in Khulna Division of Bangladesh. It has an area of 78.17 km2 (30.18 sq mi) and a population of 18,073.
