= Chila Union =

Union in Khulna, Bangladesh

Chila Union চিলা ইউনিয়ন
- Union
- Chila Union
- Country: Bangladesh
- Division: Khulna
- District: Bagerhat
- Upazila: Mongla
- Established: 1973

Area
  - Total: 78.06 km^{2} (30.14 sq mi)

Population (2011)
  - Total: 19,009
  - Density: 243.5/km^{2} (630.7/sq mi)
- Time zone: UTC+6 (BST)
- Website: chilaup.jessore.gov.bd

Chila Union (Bengali: চিলা ইউনিয়ন) is a Union parishad of Mongla Upazila, Bagerhat District in Khulna Division of Bangladesh. It has an area of 78.06 km2 (30.14 sq mi) and a population of 19,009.
