= Daibagnyahati Union =

Daibagnyahati Union দৈবজ্ঞহাটি ইউনিয়ন
- Union
- Daibagnyahati Union
- Country: Bangladesh
- Division: Khulna
- District: Bagerhat
- Upazila: Morrelganj

Area
  - Total: 54.05 km^{2} (20.87 sq mi)

Population (2011)
  - Total: 16,790
  - Density: 310.6/km^{2} (804.5/sq mi)
- Time zone: UTC+6 (BST)
- Website: daibagnyahatiup.bagerhat.gov.bd

Daibagnyahati Union (Bengali: দৈবজ্ঞহাটি ইউনিয়ন) is a Union Parishad under Morrelganj Upazila of Bagerhat District in the division of Khulna, Bangladesh. It has an area of 54.05 km2 (20.87 sq mi) and a population of 16,790.
