= Morrelgonj Municipality =

Municipality in Khulna, Bangladesh

Morrelgonj Municipality মোড়েলগঞ্জ পৌরসভা
- Municipality

Morrelgonj Municipality (Bengali: মোড়েলগঞ্জ পৌরসভা, lit. 'Morrelgonj Municipality') is a municipality in Morrelganj, Khulna, Bangladesh.

== History ==
Morrelganj Municipality was established in 25 August 1998.
