= Vojpatia Union =

Vojpatia Union ভোজপাতিয়া ইউনিয়ন
- Union
- Vojpatia Union
- Country: Bangladesh
- Division: Khulna
- District: Bagerhat
- Upazila: Rampal

Area
  - Total: 26.03 km^{2} (10.05 sq mi)

Population (2011)
  - Total: 10,495
  - Density: 403.2/km^{2} (1,044/sq mi)
- Time zone: UTC+6 (BST)
- Website: vospatiaup.bagerhat.gov.bd

Vojpatia Union (Bengali: ভোজপাতিয়া ইউনিয়ন) is a Union Parishad in Rampal Upazila of Bagerhat District in Khulna Division, Bangladesh. It has an area of 26.03 km2 (10.05 sq mi) and a population of 10,495.
