= Shantoshpur Union, Chitalmari =

Santoshpur Union সন্তোষপুর ইউনিয়ন
- Union
- Santoshpur Union
- Country: Bangladesh
- Division: Khulna
- District: Bagerhat
- Upazila: Chitalmari

Area
  - Total: 23.31 km^{2} (9.00 sq mi)

Population (2011)
  - Total: 21,736
  - Density: 932.5/km^{2} (2,415/sq mi)
- Time zone: UTC+6 (BST)
- Website: shantoshpurup.bagerhat.gov.bd

Santoshpur Union (Bengali: সন্তোষপুর ইউনিয়ন) is a union parishad of Chitalmari Upazila, Bagerhat District in Khulna Division of Bangladesh. It has an area of 23.31 km2 (9.00 sq mi) and a population of 21,736.
