= Rajnagar Union, Rampal =

Union in Khulna, Bangladesh

Rajnagar Union রাজনগর ইউনিয়ন
- Union
- Rajnagar Union
- Country: Bangladesh
- Division: Khulna
- District: Bagerhat
- Upazila: Rampal
- Established: 1966

Area
  - Total: 78.17 km^{2} (30.18 sq mi)

Population (2011)
  - Total: 13,593
  - Density: 173.9/km^{2} (450.4/sq mi)
- Time zone: UTC+6 (BST)
- Website: rajnagarup.bagerhat.gov.bd

Rajnagar Union (Bengali: রাজনগর ইউনিয়ন) is a Union Parishad under Rampal Upazila of Bagerhat District in the division of Khulna, Bangladesh. It has an area of 78.17 km2 (30.18 sq mi) and a population of 13,593 (2011).

== Villages ==
1. Kalekharber
2. Rajnagar
3. Kalikaproshad
4. Bujbunia
5. Bara durgapur
6. Choto Durgapur
7. Gona Belai
8. Chalkgona
9. Shapmari Katakhali
