= Kulia Union, Mollahat =

KuliaUnion কুলিয়া ইউনিয়ন
- Union
- Kulia Union
- Location within Bangladesh
- Country: Bangladesh
- Division: Khulna
- District: Bagerhat
- Upazila: Mollahat
- Established: 1960

Area
  - Total: 41.91 km^{2} (16.18 sq mi)

Population (2011)
  - Total: 17,101
  - Density: 408.0/km^{2} (1,057/sq mi)
- Time zone: UTC+6 (BST)
- Website: kuliaup.jessore.gov.bd

Kulia Union (Bengali: কুলিয়া ইউনিয়ন) is a Union parishad of Mollahat Upazila, Bagerhat District in Khulna Division of Bangladesh. It has an area of 41.91 km2 (16.18 sq mi) and a population of 17,101.
