= Mithakhali Union =

Union in Khulna, Bangladesh

Mithakhali Union মিঠাখালী ইউনিয়ন
- Union
- Mithakhali Union
- Country: Bangladesh
- Division: Khulna
- District: Bagerhat
- Upazila: Mongla
- Established: 1960

Area
  - Total: 89.20 km^{2} (34.44 sq mi)

Population (2011)
  - Total: 12,187
  - Density: 136.6/km^{2} (353.9/sq mi)
- Time zone: UTC+6 (BST)
- Website: mithakhaliup.jessore.gov.bd

Mithakhali Union (Bengali: মিঠাখালী ইউনিয়ন) is a Union parishad of Mongla Upazila, Bagerhat District in Khulna Division of Bangladesh. It has an area of 89.20 km^{2} (34.44 sq mi) and a population of 12,187.
