= Mollikerber Union =

Union in Khulna, Bangladesh

Mollikerber Union মল্লিকেরবেড় ইউনিয়ন
- Union
- Mollikerber Union
- Country: Bangladesh
- Division: Khulna
- District: Bagerhat
- Upazila: Rampal

Area
  - Total: 65.96 km^{2} (25.47 sq mi)

Population (2011)
  - Total: 13,370
  - Density: 202.7/km^{2} (525.0/sq mi)
- Time zone: UTC+6 (BST)
- Website: mollikerbarup.bagerhat.gov.bd

Mollikerber Union (Bengali: মল্লিকেরবেড় ইউনিয়ন) is a Union Parishad under Rampal Upazila of Bagerhat District in the division of Khulna, Bangladesh. It has an area of 65.96 km2 (25.47 sq mi) and a population of 13,370.
