= Hizla Union =

Hizla Union হিজলা ইউনিয়ন
- Union
- Hizla Union
- Country: Bangladesh
- Division: Khulna
- District: Bagerhat
- Upazila: Chitalmari
- Established: 1960

Area
  - Total: 32.63 km^{2} (12.60 sq mi)

Population (2011)
  - Total: 22,580
  - Density: 692.0/km^{2} (1,792/sq mi)
- Time zone: UTC+6 (BST)
- Website: hizlaup.bagerhat.gov.bd

Hizla Union (Bengali: হিজলা ইউনিয়ন) is a Union parishad of Chitalmari Upazila, Bagerhat District in Khulna Division of Bangladesh. It has an area of 32.63 square kilometres (12.60 mi^{2}) and a population of 22,580. There are 17 villages and 5 mouzas in the union.

== Villeges ==
1. Hizla Kazipara
2. Hizla Charpara
3. Hizla Muslimpara
4. Hizla Mollapara
5. Hizla Dakkhinpara
6. Charlatima
7. Shantikhali
8. Shibpur Katakhali
9. Kuraltala
10. Char Shaildaha
11. Betibunia
12. Shantipur
13. Poranpur
14. Pangashia
15. Pirerabad
16. Hasabunia Katakhali
17. Boalia
