= Baintala Union =

Union in Khulna, Bangladesh

Baintala Union বাইনতলা ইউনিয়ন
- Union
- Baintala Union
- Country: Bangladesh
- Division: Khulna
- District: Bagerhat
- Upazila: Rampal

Area
  - Total: 34.40 km^{2} (13.28 sq mi)

Population (2011)
  - Total: 24,223
  - Density: 704.2/km^{2} (1,824/sq mi)
- Time zone: UTC+6 (BST)
- Website: baintalaup.bagerhat.gov.bd

Baintala Union (Bengali: বাইনতলা ইউনিয়ন) is a Union Parishad under Rampal Upazila of Bagerhat District in the division of Khulna, Bangladesh. It has an area of 34.40 km2 (13.28 sq mi) and a population of 24,223.
