= Hurka Union =

Union in Khulna, Bangladesh

Hurka Union হুড়কা ইউনিয়ন
- Union
- Hurka Union
- Country: Bangladesh
- Division: Khulna
- District: Bagerhat
- Upazila: Rampal

Area
  - Total: 45.74 km^{2} (17.66 sq mi)

Population (2011)
  - Total: 7,420
  - Density: 162/km^{2} (420/sq mi)
- Time zone: UTC+6 (BST)
- Website: hurkaup.bagerhat.gov.bd

Hurka Union (Bengali: হুড়কা ইউনিয়ন) is a Union Parishad in Rampal Upazila of Bagerhat District in Khulna Division, Bangladesh. It has an area of 45.74 km2 (17.66 sq mi) and a population of 7,420.

== Demography ==
Religion (2022)
Religion	Percent
Hinduism	76.25%
Islam	23.75%
Others	0.00%
