= Chitalmari Union =

Chitalmari Union চিতলমারী ইউনিয়ন
- Union
- Chitalmari Union
- Country: Bangladesh
- Division: Khulna
- District: Bagerhat
- Upazila: Chitalmari

Area
  - Total: 52.60 km^{2} (20.31 sq mi)

Population (2011)
  - Total: 36,448
  - Density: 692.9/km^{2} (1,795/sq mi)
- Time zone: UTC+6 (BST)
- Website: chitalmariup.jessore.gov.bd

Chitalmari Union (Bengali: চিতলমারী ইউনিয়ন) is a union parishad of Chitalmari Upazila, Bagerhat District in Khulna Division of Bangladesh. This union spans an area of 52.60 km2 (20.31 sq mi) and has a population of 36,448.
