= Kalatala Union =

Kalatala Union কলাতলা ইউনিয়ন
- Union
- Kalatala Union
- Country: Bangladesh
- Division: Khulna
- District: Bagerhat
- Upazila: Chitalmari

Area
  - Total: 28.49 km^{2} (11.00 sq mi)

Population (2011)
  - Total: 30,142
  - Density: 1,058/km^{2} (2,740/sq mi)
- Time zone: UTC+6 (BST)
- Website: kalatalaup.jessore.gov.bd

Kalatala Union (Bengali: কলাতলা ইউনিয়ন) is a Union parishad of Chitalmari Upazila, Bagerhat District in Khulna Division of Bangladesh. It has an area of 28.49 km2 (11.00 sq mi) and a population of 30,142.
