= Barobaria Union =

Barobaria Union বড়বাড়িয়া ইউনিয়ন
- Union
- Barobaria Union
- Country: Bangladesh
- Division: Khulna
- District: Bagerhat
- Upazila: Chitalmari

Area
  - Total: 38.95 km^{2} (15.04 sq mi)

Population (2011)
  - Total: 25,120
  - Density: 644.9/km^{2} (1,670/sq mi)
- Time zone: UTC+6 (BST)
- Website: barobariaup.jessore.gov.bd

Barobaria Union (Bengali: বড়বাড়িয়া ইউনিয়ন) is a Union parishad of Chitalmari Upazila, Bagerhat District in Khulna Division of Bangladesh. It has an area of 38.95 km2 (15.04 sq mi) and a population of 25,120.
