= Charbaniari Union =

Charbaniari Union চরবানিয়ারী ইউনিয়ন
- Union
- Charbaniari Union
- Country: Bangladesh
- Division: Khulna
- District: Bagerhat
- Upazila: Chitalmari

Area
  - Total: 63.66 km^{2} (24.58 sq mi)

Population (2011)
  - Total: 19,167
  - Density: 301.1/km^{2} (779.8/sq mi)
- Time zone: UTC+6 (BST)
- Website: charbaniriup.jessore.gov.bd

Charbaniari Union (Bengali: চরবানিয়ারী ইউনিয়ন) is a union parishad of Chitalmari Upazila, Bagerhat District in Khulna Division of Bangladesh. The union has an area of 63.66 km2 (24.58 sq mi) and a population of 19,167.

== Demography ==
Religion (2022)
Religion	Percent
Hinduism	72.41%
Islam	27.58%
Others	0.01%
