= Kulia Union, Debhata =

Kulia Union কুলিয়া ইউনিয়ন
- Union
- Kulia Union
- Location within Bangladesh
- Coordinates: 22.6405°N 88.9869°E
- Country: Bangladesh
- Division: Khulna
- District: Satkhira
- Upazila: Debhata
- Time zone: UTC+6 (BST)
- Website: kuliaup.satkhira.gov.bd

Kulia (Bengali: কুলিয়া) is a union parishad situated at the north-west part of Debhata Upazila, in Satkhira District, Khulna Division of Bangladesh.

== History ==
Guruthakurgans of Satkhira zamindars lived in Kulia Union which is why the post office and a village are called Gurugram.

== Geography ==
Kuliya Union is bounded on the north by Alipore Union, on the south by Parulia Union, on the east by Fingri Union and Bhomra, which is adjacent to the Indian state of West Bengal.

Area: 59.49 sq. km.

== Demographics ==
Population: 35,154. 17,949 males, 18,205 females, 26,364 Muslims, 6,375 Hindus and 2,393 others.

== Administration ==
01 No Word Bohera 02 No Ward Baliadanga Hirarchak 03 No Ward Pushpokati Khaskhamar 04 No Ward North. Kulia 05 No Ward South: Kulia 06 No Ward East Kulia Dattadanga Kamat Para Kultali 07 No Word Subarnabad Nunekhola Raghunathpur Ramnagar	08 No Ward Tickets Deukul Gabindapur Pargava Rajaram Hizoldanga 09 No Ward Shashadanga Shyamnagar Gobrakhali Vennapota Borboria Dhalir Gher Andulpota Kadamkhali Charbalitha Bill Shimulbaria Jelmari Koremari

=== List of chairmen ===
Current Chairman is Md. Asadul Haque

Serial No.	The names of the chairmen	are term
01	Abu Salek Sardar	British to 1966
02	Abdul Ghaffar Sardar	1966-1971
03	Nurul Momin Sardar	1972-1988
04	Md. Asadul Haque	1988-2016
05	Md. Imadul Islam	2016-2021
06	Md. Asadul Haque	2021–present

== Education ==
Just like any other areas in Bangladesh, Kulia has few number of educational institutions. They include:

- Bohera A.T. Secondary School
- Kulia Girls Secondary School
- Bohera Primary School
- Hazrat Naimuddin (RH) Hafijia & Foorkania Madrasah
- Shashadanga Government Primary School

Literacy rate: 86.04%

Educational Institutions

The number of primary schools is 8

02 secondary schools

1 secondary girls school

Dakhil Madrasa 3

There are 37 sub-formal schools

Jami Masjid 48
