= Gouramva Union =

Union in Khulna, Bangladesh

Gouramva Union গৌরম্ভা ইউনিয়ন
- Union
- Gouramva Union
- Country: Bangladesh
- Division: Khulna
- District: Bagerhat
- Upazila: Rampal

Area
  - Total: 33.38 km^{2} (12.89 sq mi)

Population (2011)
  - Total: 18,744
  - Density: 561.5/km^{2} (1,454/sq mi)
- Time zone: UTC+6 (BST)
- Website: gouramvaup.bagerhat.gov.bd

Gouramva Union (Bengali: গৌরম্ভা ইউনিয়ন) is a Union parishad under Rampal Upazila of Bagerhat District in the division of Khulna, Bangladesh. It has an area of 33.38 km² (12.89 sq mi) and a population of 18,744.
