= Uzalkur Union =

Union in Khulna, Bangladesh

Gouramva Union উজলকুড় ইউনিয়ন
- Union
- Uzalkur Union
- Country: Bangladesh
- Division: Khulna
- District: Bagerhat
- Upazila: Rampal

Area
  - Total: 81.20 km^{2} (31.35 sq mi)

Population (2011)
  - Total: 36,103
  - Density: 444.6/km^{2} (1,152/sq mi)
- Time zone: UTC+6 (BST)
- Website: gouramvaup.bagerhat.gov.bd

Uzalkur Union (Bengali: উজলকুড় ইউনিয়ন) is a Union Parishad under Rampal Upazila of Bagerhat District in Khulna Division, Bangladesh. It has an area of 81.20 km2 (31.35 sq mi) and a population of 36,103.
