= Banshtoli Union =

Banshtoli Union বাঁশতলী ইউনিয়ন
- Union
- Banshtoli Union
- Country: Bangladesh
- Division: Khulna
- District: Bagerhat
- Upazila: Rampal

Area
  - Total: 34.68 km^{2} (13.39 sq mi)

Population (2011)
  - Total: 15,726
  - Density: 453.5/km^{2} (1,174/sq mi)
- Time zone: UTC+6 (BST)
- Website: bastoliup.bagerhat.gov.bd

Banshtoli Union (Bengali: হুড়কা ইউনিয়ন) is a Union Parishad under Rampal Upazila of Bagerhat District in the division of Khulna, Bangladesh. It has an area of 34.68 km2 (13.39 sq mi) and a population of 15,726.
