= Rampal Upazila =

Rampal রামপাল
- Upazila
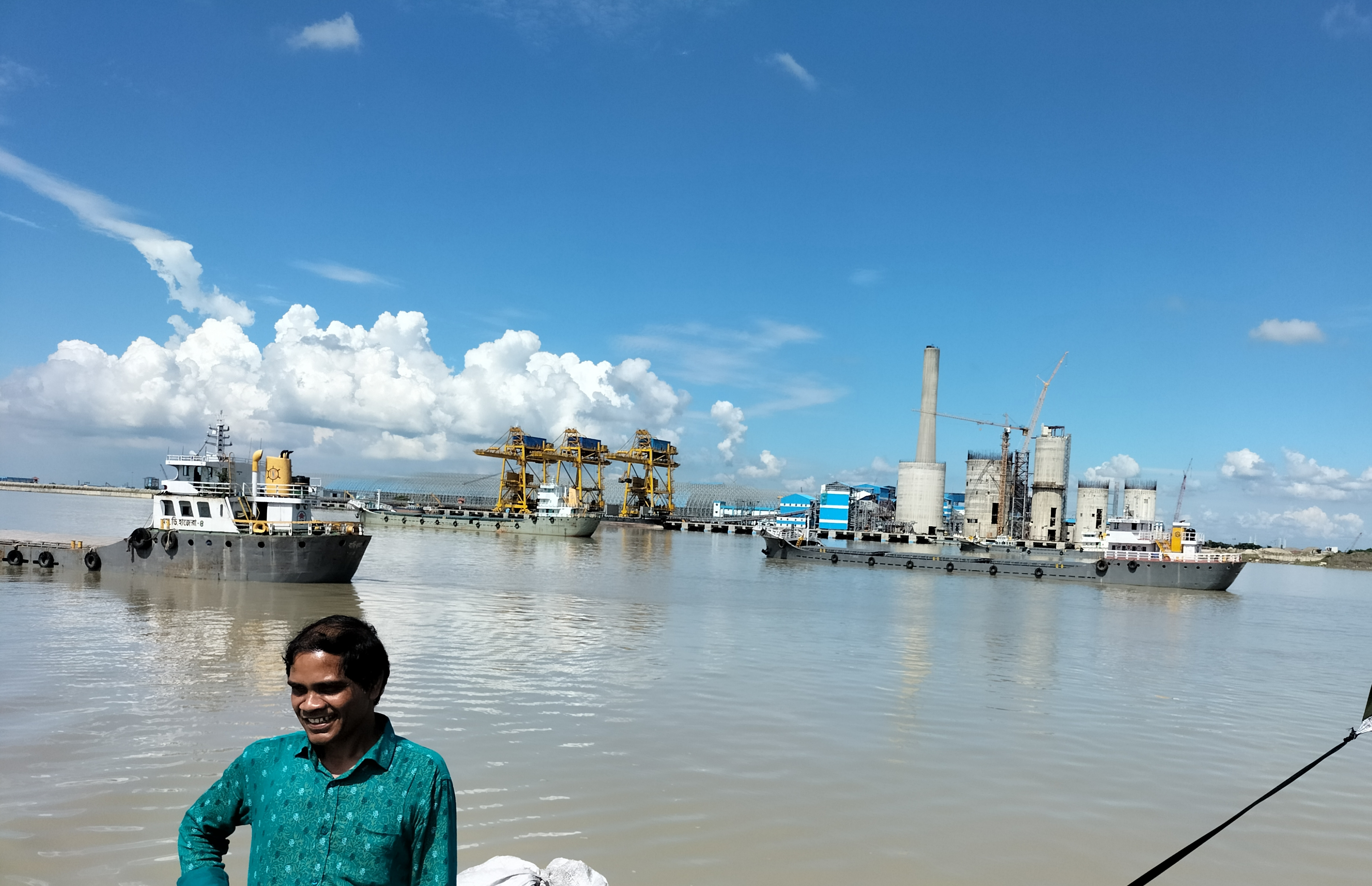
- Rampal Power Plant

- Coordinates: 22°34′N 89°39.8′E
- Country: Bangladesh
- Division: Khulna
- District: Bagerhat

Area
  - Total: 335.45 km^{2} (129.52 sq mi)

Population (2022)
  - Total: 176,058
  - Density: 524.84/km^{2} (1,359.3/sq mi)
- Time zone: UTC+6 (BST)
- Postal code: 9340
- Area code: 04657
- Website: Official Map of Rampal

Rampal Upazila mauza geocode map

Rampal (Bengali: রামপাল) is an upazila of Bagerhat District in the Division of Khulna, Bangladesh. Rampal Thana was formed in 1892 and it was turned into an upazila in 1983.

== Geography ==
Rampal is located at 22.5667°N 89.6639°E. It has 38,173 households and total area 335.45 km^{2}. It is bounded by Bagerhat Sadar and Fakirhat Upazilas on the north; Mongla and Morrelganj Upazilas on the south; Morrelganj and Bagerhat Sadar Upazilas on the east; and Batiaghata and Dacope Upazilas on the west.

== Demographics ==
According to the 2022 Bangladeshi census, Rampal Upazila had 44,269 households and a population of 176,058. 7.98% were under 5 years of age. Rampal had a literacy rate of 80.95%: 82.58% for males and 79.22% for females, with a sex ratio of 106.55 males per 100 females. 19,624 (11.15%) lived in urban areas.

Religions in Rampal Upazila (2022)
Religion	Percent
Islam	81.64%
Hinduism	18.08%
Other or not stated	0.28%

Population by religion by Union
Union	Muslim	Hindu	Others
Baintala Union	20,375	2,129	0
Banshtoli Union	12,410	2,617	92
Vojpatia Union	6,261	1,830	0
Gouramva Union	18,249	1,695	0
Hurka Union	1,640	5,264	0
Mollikerber Union	9,282	2,500	1
Perikhali Union	13,488	1,950	0
Rajnagar Union	11,001	6,494	16
Rampal Union	21,706	4,394	15
Uzalkur Union	29,318	2,862	359

🟩 Muslim majority 🟧 Hindu majority

As of the 2011 Census of Bangladesh, Rampal upazila had 38,173 households and a population of 158,965. 28,230 (17.76%) were under 10 years of age. Rampal had an average literacy rate of 57.97%, compared to the national average of 51.8%, and a sex ratio of 999 females per 1000 males. 1,720 (1.11%) of the population lived in urban areas.

According to the 2001 Bangladesh census, Rampal had a population of 178,503—males 92,059, females 86,444; Muslims 139,193, Hindus 38,804, Christians 458, and others 48.

As of the 1991 Bangladesh census, the upazila had a population of 167,070. Males constituted 50.83% of the population, and females 49.17%. This upazila's eighteen up population was 93518. Rampal had an average literacy rate of 45.5% (7+ years), and the national average of 32.4% literate.

== Administration ==
Rampal Upazila is divided into ten union parishads: Baintala, Banshtali, Bhojpatia, Gaurambha, Hurka, Mallikerber, Perikhali, Rajnagar, Rampal, and Ujalkur. The union parishads are subdivided into 117 mauzas and 135 villages.

== Nearest Tourist Attractions ==
- Sixty Dome Mosque
- Karamjal Wildlife Breeding Center
- Khan Jahan Ali Dighi
- Chandra Mohal Eco Park

== See also ==
- Upazilas of Bangladesh
- Districts of Bangladesh
- Divisions of Bangladesh
