= Perikhali Union =

Union in Khulna, Bangladesh

Perikhali Union পেড়িখালী ইউনিয়ন
- Union
- Perikhali Union
- Country: Bangladesh
- Division: Khulna
- District: Bagerhat
- Upazila: Rampal

Area
  - Total: 135.97 km^{2} (52.50 sq mi)

Population (2011)
  - Total: 17,616
  - Density: 129.56/km^{2} (335.55/sq mi)
- Time zone: UTC+6 (BST)
- Website: perikhaliup.bagerhat.gov.bd

Perikhali Union (Bengali: পেড়িখালী ইউনিয়ন) is a Union Parishad under Rampal Upazila of Bagerhat District in the division of Khulna, Bangladesh. It has an area of 135.97 km2 (52.50 sq mi) and a population of 17,616.
