= Chitalmari Upazila =

Chitalmari চিতলমারি
- Upazila
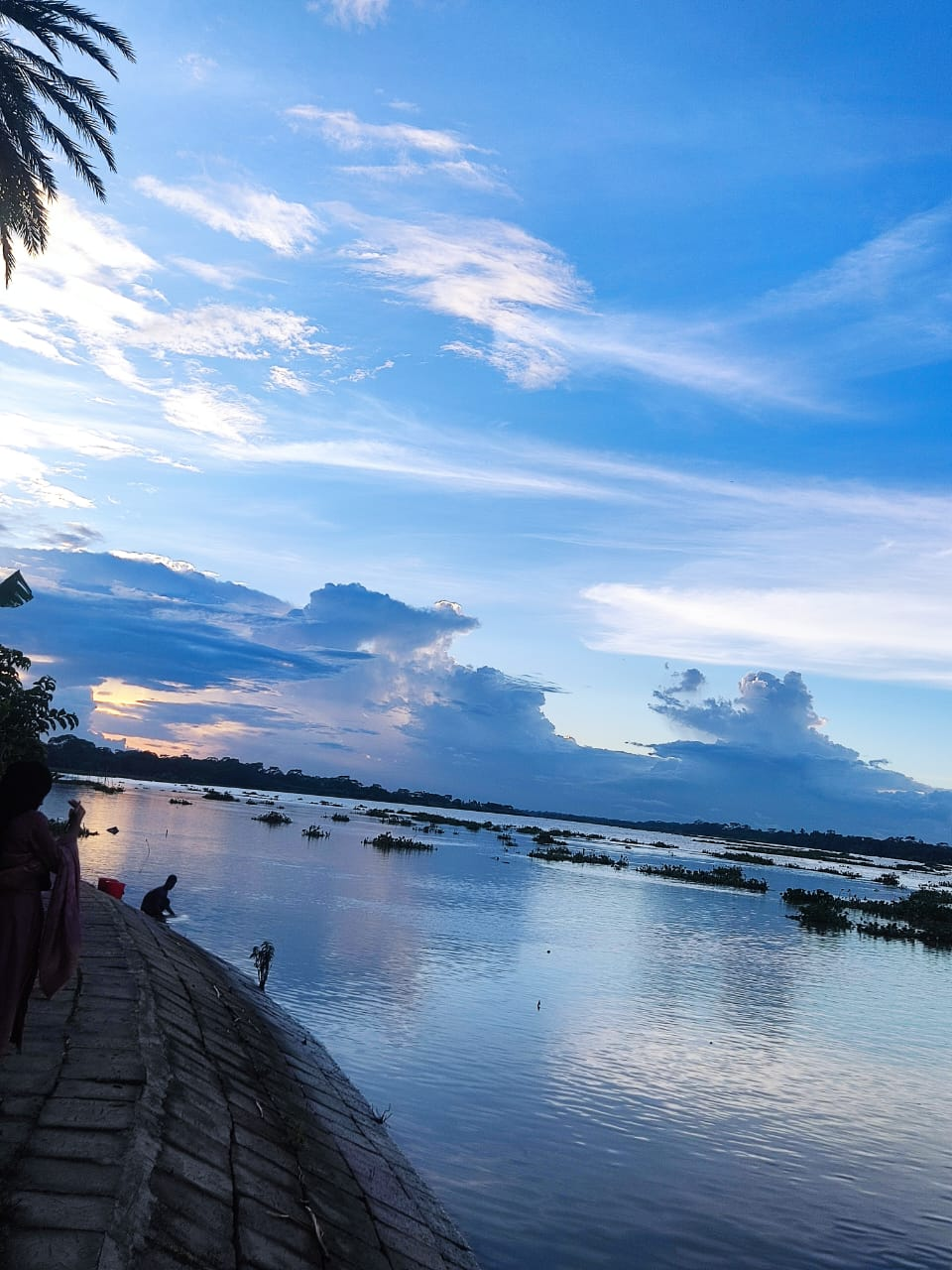
- Madhumati River at Chitalmari

- Coordinates: 22°47.5′N 89°52.7′E
- Country: Bangladesh
- Division: Khulna
- District: Bagerhat

Area
  - Total: 191.99 km^{2} (74.13 sq mi)

Population (2022)
  - Total: 153,033
  - Density: 797.09/km^{2} (2,064.4/sq mi)
- Time zone: UTC+6 (BST)
- GPO: 9360
- Area code: 04652
- Website: chitalmari.bagerhat.gov.bd

Chitalmari Upazila mauza geocode map

Chitalmari (Bengali: চিতলমারি) is an upazila of Bagerhat District in the Khulna Division, Bangladesh.

== Geography ==
Chitalmari is located at 22.78071°N 89.87390°E. It has a total area of 191.99 km^{2}. Chitalmari Upazila is bounded by Tungipara Upazila on the north, Kachua Upazila and Bagerhat Sadar Upazila on the south, Nazirpur Upazila on the east, and Mollahat Upazila and Fakirhat Upazila on the west. Lakkhanar Beel, Kalshirar Beel and Ruiar Beel are notable. The main rivers are the Madhumati, Kaliganga, Chitra, and Baleshwar.

== Demographics ==
According to the 2022 Bangladeshi census, Chitalmari Upazila had 35,811 households and a population of 153,033. 9.62% were under 5 years of age. Chitalmari had a literacy rate of 79.52%: 80.69% for males and 78.32% for females, with a sex ratio of 102.01 males per 100 females. 27,265 (17.82%) lived in urban areas.

Religions in Chitalmari Upazila (2022)
Religion	Percent
Islam	69.75%
Hinduism	30.23%
Other or not stated	0.02%

Population by religion in Union
Union	Muslim	Hindu	Others
Barobaria Union	22,903	6,602	3
Charbaniari Union	4,751	12,001	2
Chitalmari Union	19,676	11,065	17
Hizla Union	13,810	6,084	1
Kalatala Union	22,017	2,089	2
Shantoshpur Union	11,471	6,630	3
Shibpur Union	12,120	1,784	2

🟩 Muslim majority 🟧 Hindu majority

As of the 2011 Census of Bangladesh, Chitalmari upazila had 30,264 households and a population of 138,810. 32,789 (23.62%) were under 10 years of age. Chitalmari had an average literacy rate of 56.19%, compared to the national average of 51.8%, and a sex ratio of 1000 females per 1000 males. 1,272 (0.92%) of the population lived in urban areas.

As of the 1991 Bangladesh census, Chitalmari upazila had a population of 127,524. Males constituted 50.78% of the population, and females 49.22%. This Upazila's eighteen-and-up population is 65,065. Chitalmari had an average literacy rate of 37% (7+ years), and the national average is 32.4% literate. Chitalmari's religious composition is 60.45% Muslim, 39.35% Hindu, and 2% others. Religious institutions include 184 mosques, 72 temples, and one church. Sacred places are Central Jami Mosque, Durgapur Temple. Boalia Durga Mandir and Panchapalli Sarbojnin Durga Mandir. There was a Jamidari Kachharibari at Sabokhali.

== Economy ==
The majority of the population, 76%, is engaged in agriculture. There are 15,584 hectares of arable land, and 74% of the population owns property to some extent. The main crops grown include paddy, wheat, jute, and pulse, with fruits including mango, blackberry, papaya, watermelon, banana, coconut, guava and betel nut. The last three fruits are among the primary exports of the region, along with rice, vegetables and leather.

Other major occupations include commerce (11%), service (6%) and transport and communication (1%).

== Administration ==
Chitalmari, formed as a thana in 1981, was turned into an upazila on 7 November 1983.

The upazila is divided into seven union parishads: Barabaria, Char Baniari, Chitalmari, Hizla, Santoshpur, Kalatala, and Shibpur. The union parishads are subdivided into 55 mauzas and 121 villages.

== Infrastructure ==
There are many private hospitals and one 50-bed hospital. Educational institutions include three colleges (Sher-E-Bangla Degree College and Bangobondhu Women's College, Kalidas Baral Smriti Degree College), 26 high schools, 14 madrasas, 63 government primary schools and 45 non-government primary schools.

There is one public library, one cinema hall, 2 theatre groups, 123 rural clubs and 30 playgrounds.
