= Rahimullah of Baraikhali =

Leader of resistance movement against British Raj in Bengal

Shahid Rahimullah
- রহিমুল্লাহ
- Born: 18th-century Baraikhali, Khulna, Bengal Presidency
- Died: 25 November 1861; Morrelganj, Khulna, Bengal Presidency
- Movement: Peasant rebellion
- Father: Jahangir

Shahīd Rahimullah of Baraikhali (Bengali: বারইখালীর রহিমুল্লাহ; died 25 November 1861) was the leader of native resistance in the Sundarbans of Bengal, against the colonial officers and indigo cultivators of the British Raj. He was killed in 1861 while leading rebel farmers in a battle against the landlords' forces.

== Background and family ==
Rahimullah was born in the 18th century to a Bengali Muslim family from the village of Baraikhali in the Sundarbans. With the advent of British colonial rule, an administrative centre had been established on the south side of the Saralia canal on the west bank of the Panguchi River, with the aim of securing the Sundarbans region of South Bengal. Boundaries were determined in 1828, with some areas being used for cultivation while others were gifted to allied zamindars such as Kashinath Munshi of the 24 Parganas. The latter's Baraikhali area later fell under the possession of Rahimullah's father, Jahangir, who became an influential chief among the local villagers. In the same period, the widow of colonial officer Mr. Morrel demanded the British East India Company to grant her two sons the zamindari of Saralia and neighbouring areas. Munshi gifted parts of his vast zamindari to the Morrel family, who founded a large estate in 1849, consisting of a mansion, warehouse, prison cell and private army base. The area was subsequently named as Morrelganj.

Rahimullah was trained in a traditional Bengali martial art known as lathi khela. At a later age, he moved to Calcutta where he intended to pursue an education and learn the English language. He developed a relationship with the likes of Bankim Chandra Chatterjee and Michael Madhusudan Dutt. However, Rahimullah's Anglophile aspirations did not last too long, as he received news of the poor treatment of the natives of Baraikhali. Thus, Rahimullah's sojourn in Calcutta was cut short, despite Chatterjee's requests to stay, and he returned to his home village.

== Chief of Baraikhali ==
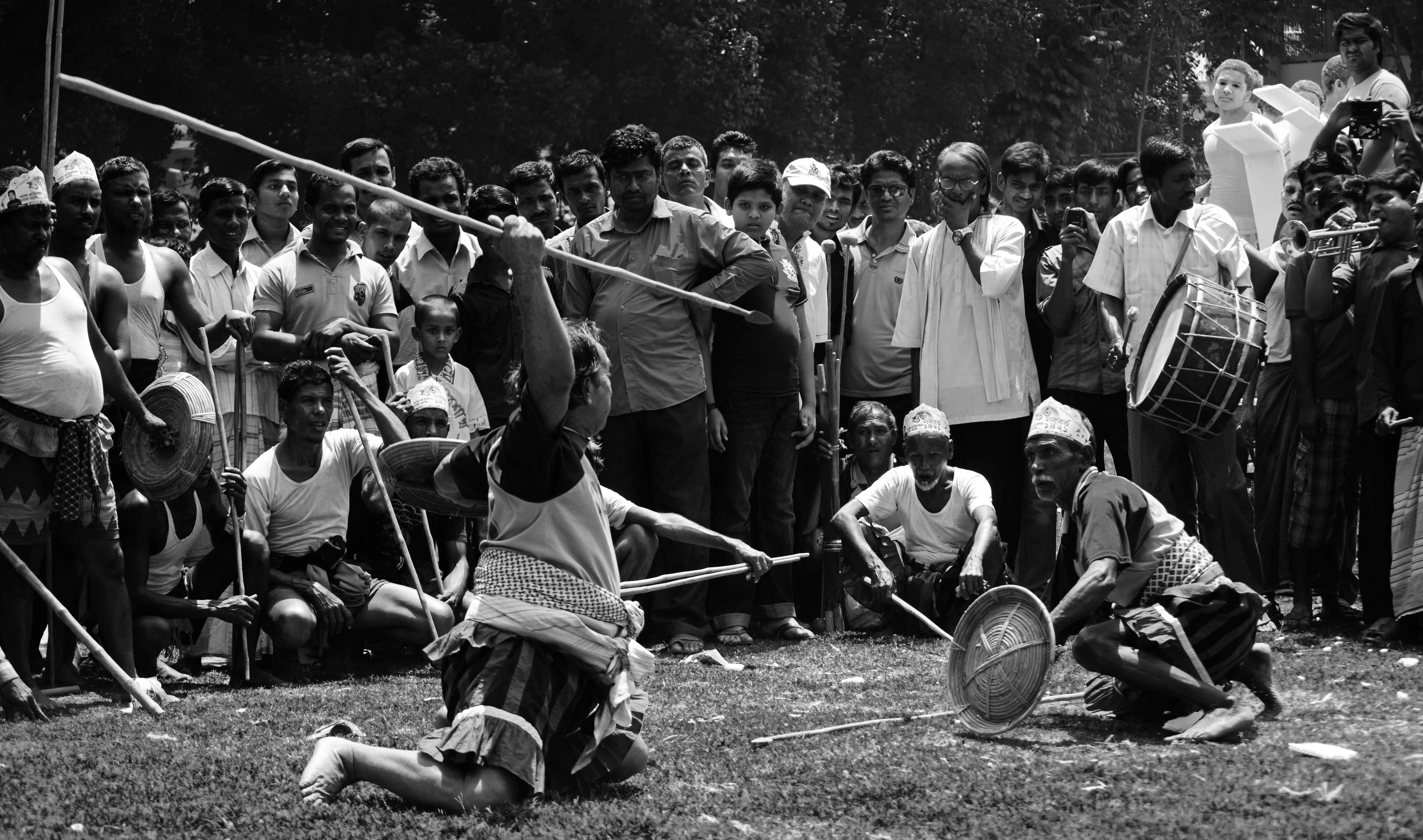
Stick-fighting, or lathi khela, is a traditional Bengali martial art.

The local farmers had become victims of oppression and looting as a result of the lathial forces of Dennis Haley, the manager of the Morrel Estate. Henry Morrel had established an indigo factory (nil kuthi) in the area, and Haley began to force the local peasantry to assist in the plantation of indigo. After his father's death, Rahimullah became the chief of a group of rebel farmers in the area. Already a trained lathial (stick-fighter) himself, Rahimullah rose to popularity. Along with his eight brothers, Rahimullah cultivated 1400 bighas of land. As a result, he was summoned by Robert Morrel but instead of obeying, he chased Morrel's footmen away. Morrel then sent his personal attendant to negotiate with Rahimullah, but he refused to visit the Morrel Estate. Thus, a meeting between the two parties was held in a large boat that lay between the two areas. Robert Morrel asked Rahimullah to pay rent for the cultivated land to which he refused. Footmen were sent once more to Rahimullah after that, to which he sent a wooden box containing ripped women's shoes instead of money.

Robert Morrel's brother, Henry Morrel, decided to change the approach to suppressing Rahimullah. Henry conspired with Rahimullah's associate and neighbour, Mamun Taluqdar, promising to give him land. On 21 November 1861, Mamun Taluqdar assisted by hundreds of Morrel's lathials infiltrated Rahimullah's territory. Rahimullah attempted to resist such oppression by courageously forming his own resistance force and building a fort. The resistance ensued a fierce clash between both sides. Haley's forces fled eventually fled the battlefield after the death of their sardar, Rāmdhan Mālo, and seven others. Dennis Haley and Henry Morrel were captured and sent to Rahimullah but were released after they promised to never invade his land again.

However, Morrel continued to conspire with Haley to subdue Rahimullah. On 25 November, they raided Rahimullah's house late at night in retaliation. However, Rahimullah had already speculated that his house may be attacked. Thus, he had constructed a moat around his home before and made arrangements to prevent such a raid from happening. His two wives and two babies were the only other people in the house. Haley's forces began to shoot towards the house, though Rahimullah also had two musket guns in his possession. His supporters fought a fierce battle throughout the night. His wives' silver anklets, collarbones and wrist bangles were shattered due to the shooting. After the shooting stopped, Rahimullah left the house. Morrel's forces had moved eastwards. However, they were still able to gun him down. Rahimullah was killed, with both sides losing seventeen people and many more injured. Haley's force seized the bodies of Rahimullah and other rebels, burning them in the forests of the Sundarbans. They cremated Rahimullah's body in the estuary of Kacha river. His two wives were subjected to violence and oppression too and then thrown into the Bay of Bengal along with the two babies. However, a fisherman managed to save them from drowning.

== Aftermath ==
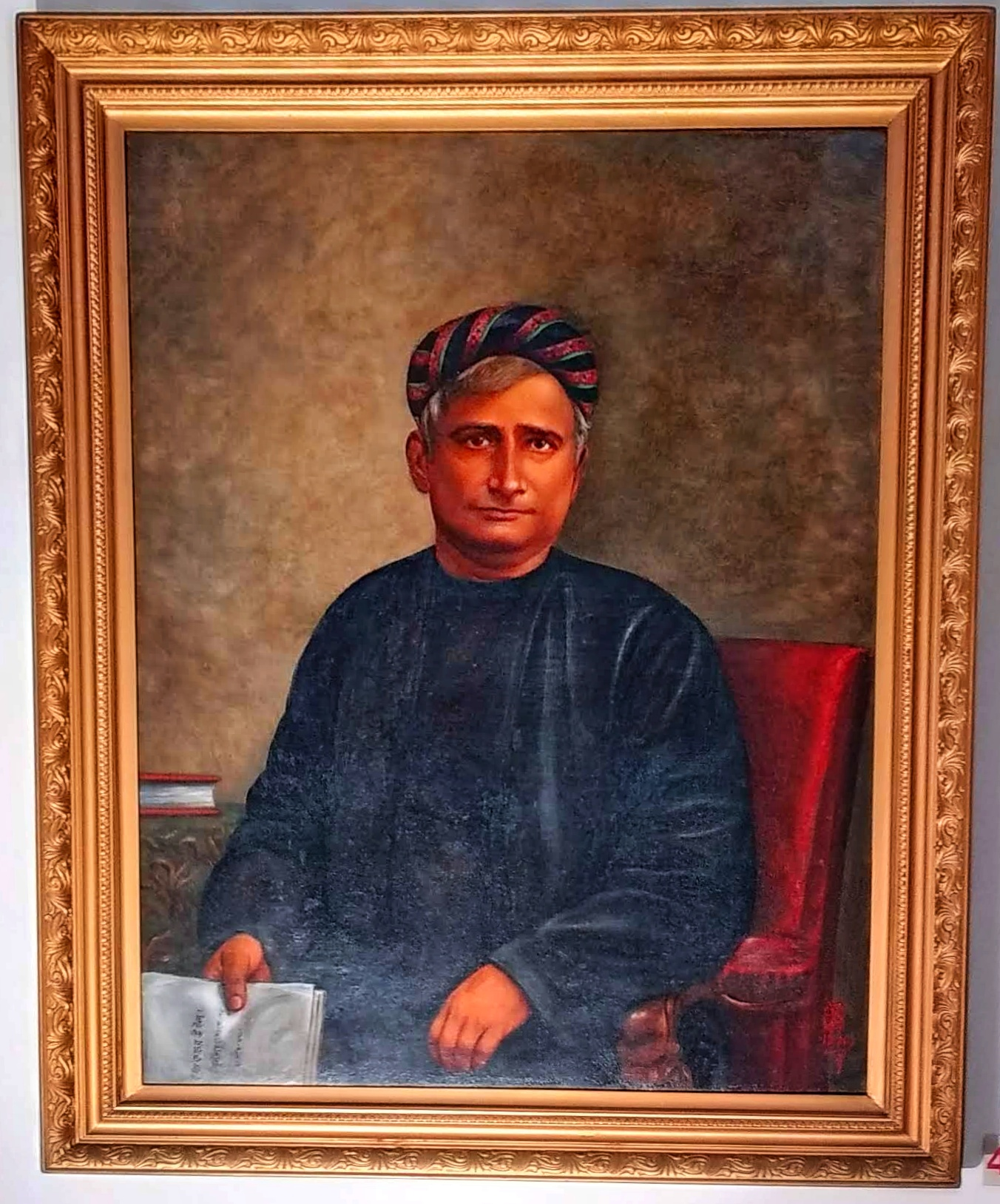
Bankim Chandra Chatterjee who initiated an enquiry into Rahimullah's death.

The erstwhile Magistrate of Khulna Subdivision, Bankim Chandra Chatterjee, directed an inquiry into the conflict. He himself went to Morrelganj and found Haley guilty and gave a long report to the district magistrate. He also issued an arrest warrant in Haley's name when he fled with Henry Morrel and Durga Charan. Many of Haley's associates were arrested, with Henry Morrel being arrested in Bombay and Durga Charan in Vrindavan. At that time, Haley tried to intimidate Chatterjee by giving him a bribe of up to 100,000 rupees. The case went on for fifteen years and the Jessore Sessions Court ordered the execution of one person and the deportation of 34 others. Only the native accomplices of Haley were prosecuted. Haley was released as no one was able to identify him.

Morrelganj survived as a name for the local area throughout the British Raj and after independence as the Morrelganj Upazila. Locals continue to demand the renaming of Morrelganj to Rahimganj or Rahimnagar though it has not been fulfilled.

== See also ==
- Chowdhury Abu Torab Khan
- Muharram Rebellion
