= Bohera A.T. Secondary School =

School in Bangladesh

Coordinates: 22.6494°N 89.9924°E

Bohera A.T. Secondary School (Bengali: বহেরা এ.টি. মাধ্যমিক বিদ্যালয়, romanized: Bahērā ē.Ṭi. Mādhyamika bidyālaẏa) (EIIN - 118617) is one of the old schools of Debhata Upazila of Satkhira District. It was established in 1927. The school was named after two eminent persons named Azizul and Tosimuddin. The school is under Jessore Education Board.

== See also ==
- Education in Bangladesh
