= Shibpur Union, Chitalmari =

Shibpur Union শিবপুর ইউনিয়ন
- Union
- Shibpur Union
- Country: Bangladesh
- Division: Khulna
- District: Bagerhat
- Upazila: Chitalmari

Area
  - Total: 37.30 km^{2} (14.40 sq mi)

Population (2011)
  - Total: 25,336
  - Density: 679.2/km^{2} (1,759/sq mi)
- Time zone: UTC+6 (BST)
- Website: shibpurup.jessore.gov.bd

Shibpur Union (Bengali: শিবপুর ইউনিয়ন) is a Union parishad of Chitalmari Upazila, Bagerhat District in Khulna Division of Bangladesh. Shibpur Union has an area of 37.30 km2 (14.40 sq mi) and a population of 25,336.
