= Mongla Upazila =

Mongla মোংলা
- Upazila
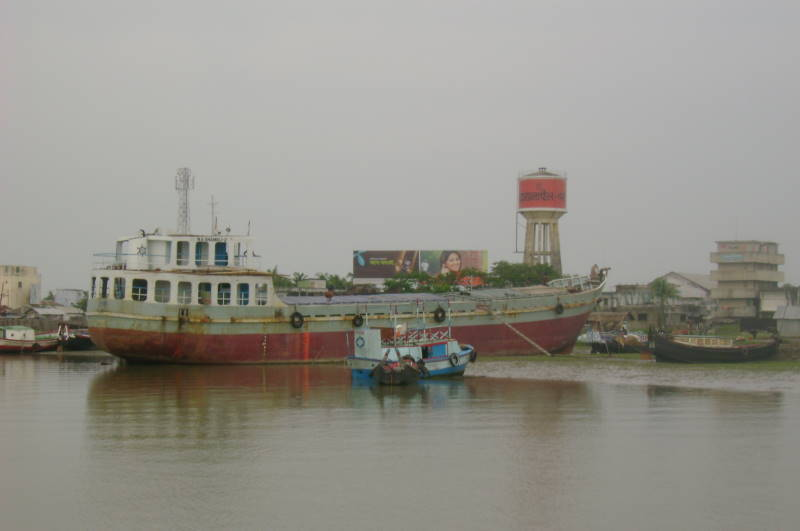
- Boats in Mongla

- Coordinates: 22°29′N 89°36.5′E
- Country: Bangladesh
- Division: Khulna
- District: Bagerhat
- Headquarters: Mongla

Area
  - Total: 1,461.20 km^{2} (564.17 sq mi)

Population (2022)
  - Total: 158,470
  - Density: 108.45/km^{2} (280.89/sq mi)
- Time zone: UTC+6 (BST)
- Postal code: 9350
- Area code: 04658
- Website: Official Map of Mongla

Mongla Upazila mauza geocode map

Mongla (Bengali: মোংলা) is an upazila of Bagerhat District in the Division of Khulna, Bangladesh. Its headquarters are the town of Mongla.

== Geography ==
Mongla is located at 22.4833°N 89.6083°E. It has 32,383 households and total area 1461.20 km^{2}.

Mongla Upazila borders Rampal Upazila on the north, the Bay of Bengal on the south, Morrelganj and Sarankhola Upazilas on the east and Dacope Upazila on the west. The main rivers are the Pasur and the Mongla.

The town of Mongla stands on the river Pasur. It is the second biggest seaport of the country. The area of the town is 17.79 km^{2}.

=== The Port of Mongla ===
There is a link port in Khulna city. It is the second-largest and busiest seaport in Bangladesh. It is situated close to the shores of the Bay of Bengal and the Pashur river.

=== Climate ===
Climate data for Mongla (1991–2020, extremes 1988-present)
Month	Jan	Feb	Mar	Apr	May	Jun	Jul	Aug	Sep	Oct	Nov	Dec	Year
Record high °C (°F)	31.5 (88.7)	37.2 (99.0)	39.4 (102.9)	40.5 (104.9)	40.2 (104.4)	38.2 (100.8)	37.2 (99.0)	36.3 (97.3)	37.5 (99.5)	36.5 (97.7)	35.1 (95.2)	30.6 (87.1)	40.5 (104.9)
Mean daily maximum °C (°F)	25.2 (77.4)	29.0 (84.2)	33.0 (91.4)	34.9 (94.8)	34.7 (94.5)	33.0 (91.4)	31.9 (89.4)	31.9 (89.4)	32.1 (89.8)	31.8 (89.2)	29.6 (85.3)	26.3 (79.3)	31.1 (88.0)
Daily mean °C (°F)	18.8 (65.8)	22.5 (72.5)	26.8 (80.2)	29.3 (84.7)	29.8 (85.6)	29.3 (84.7)	28.7 (83.7)	28.7 (83.7)	28.5 (83.3)	27.5 (81.5)	24.3 (75.7)	20.2 (68.4)	26.2 (79.2)
Mean daily minimum °C (°F)	13.8 (56.8)	17.2 (63.0)	21.9 (71.4)	24.9 (76.8)	26.0 (78.8)	26.6 (79.9)	26.4 (79.5)	26.4 (79.5)	26.1 (79.0)	24.5 (76.1)	20.3 (68.5)	15.7 (60.3)	22.5 (72.5)
Record low °C (°F)	7.2 (45.0)	10.2 (50.4)	13.8 (56.8)	18.0 (64.4)	18.5 (65.3)	21.2 (70.2)	23.0 (73.4)	23.3 (73.9)	22.8 (73.0)	18.8 (65.8)	13.8 (56.8)	9.3 (48.7)	7.2 (45.0)
Average precipitation mm (inches)	11 (0.4)	25 (1.0)	36 (1.4)	60 (2.4)	180 (7.1)	350 (13.8)	406 (16.0)	338 (13.3)	308 (12.1)	177 (7.0)	41 (1.6)	5 (0.2)	1,941 (76.4)
Average precipitation days (≥ 1 mm)	2	2	3	5	11	18	25	23	18	10	2	1	120
Average relative humidity (%)	75	73	73	77	80	86	88	88	88	85	80	77	81
Mean monthly sunshine hours	220.9	227.4	255.5	250.4	235.1	147.8	135.1	144.7	157.8	217.3	234.9	212.0	2,438.9
Source 1: NOAA
Source 2: Bangladesh Meteorological Department (humidity 1981-2010)

== Demographics ==
Religions in Mongla Upazila (2022)
Religion	Percent
Islam	78.62%
Hinduism	18.34%
Christianity	3.02%
Other or not stated	0.02%

According to the 2022 Bangladeshi census, Mongla Upazila had 41,561 households and a population of 158,470. 8.44% were under 5 years of age. Mongla had a literacy rate of 81.21%: 82.73% for males and 79.65% for females, with a sex ratio of 102.30 males per 100 females. 81,822 (51.64%) lived in urban areas.

As of the 2011 Census of Bangladesh, Mongla upazila had 32,383 households and a population of 136,588. 23,583 (17.27%) were under 10 years of age. Mongla had an average literacy rate of 57.20%, compared to the national average of 51.8%, and a sex ratio of 911 females per 1000 males. 39,837 (29.17%) of the population lived in urban areas.

According to the 1991 Bangladesh census, Mongla had a population of 137,947. Males constituted 54.73% of the population, and females 45.27%. The population aged 18 or over was 77,995. Mongla had an average literacy rate of 42.8% (7+ years), compared to the national average of 32.4% literate.

Mongla municipality was established in 1991. The town has a population of 60561; males 57.27%, females 42.73%). The population density is 2943 people per km^{2}. The literacy rate among the town's people is 53.6%. The town has a Dak bungalow.

71.31% of the population is Muslim, 24.95% are Hindu, and 3.74% follow other beliefs.

== Administration ==
Mongla thana was established in 1976 and was turned into an upazila in 1983.

Mongla Upazila is divided into Mongla Municipality and six union parishads: Burirdanga, Chandpi, Chila, Mithakhali, Suniltala, and Sundarban. The union parishads are subdivided into 32 mauzas and 76 villages.

Mongla Municipality is subdivided into 9 wards and 13 mahallas.

== Education ==
The literacy rate is 42.80%, comprising 49.6% among males, and 34.2% among females. The educational institutions comprise four colleges, 20 high schools, a junior school, 32 government primary schools, 29 non-government primary schools, five satellite schools and 18 madrasas, the most noted of which is Saint Paul's High School. It was established in 1954 by Italian missionaries. After that, Freedom Fighter Father Marino Rigon dedicated his whole career for this, and he was buried in Mongla too.

According to Banglapedia, Mongla Bandar Secondary School, founded in 1987, is a notable secondary school.

Tatibunia Secondary School is located in Dattermet.

== Media ==
The newspapers and periodicals are the Daily Sundarban and weekly Mongla.

== Notable people ==
- Rudra Mohammad Shahidullah (1956–1991) — Bangladeshi Poet & Author
