= Sarankhola Upazila =

Sarankhola শরণখোলা
- Upazila
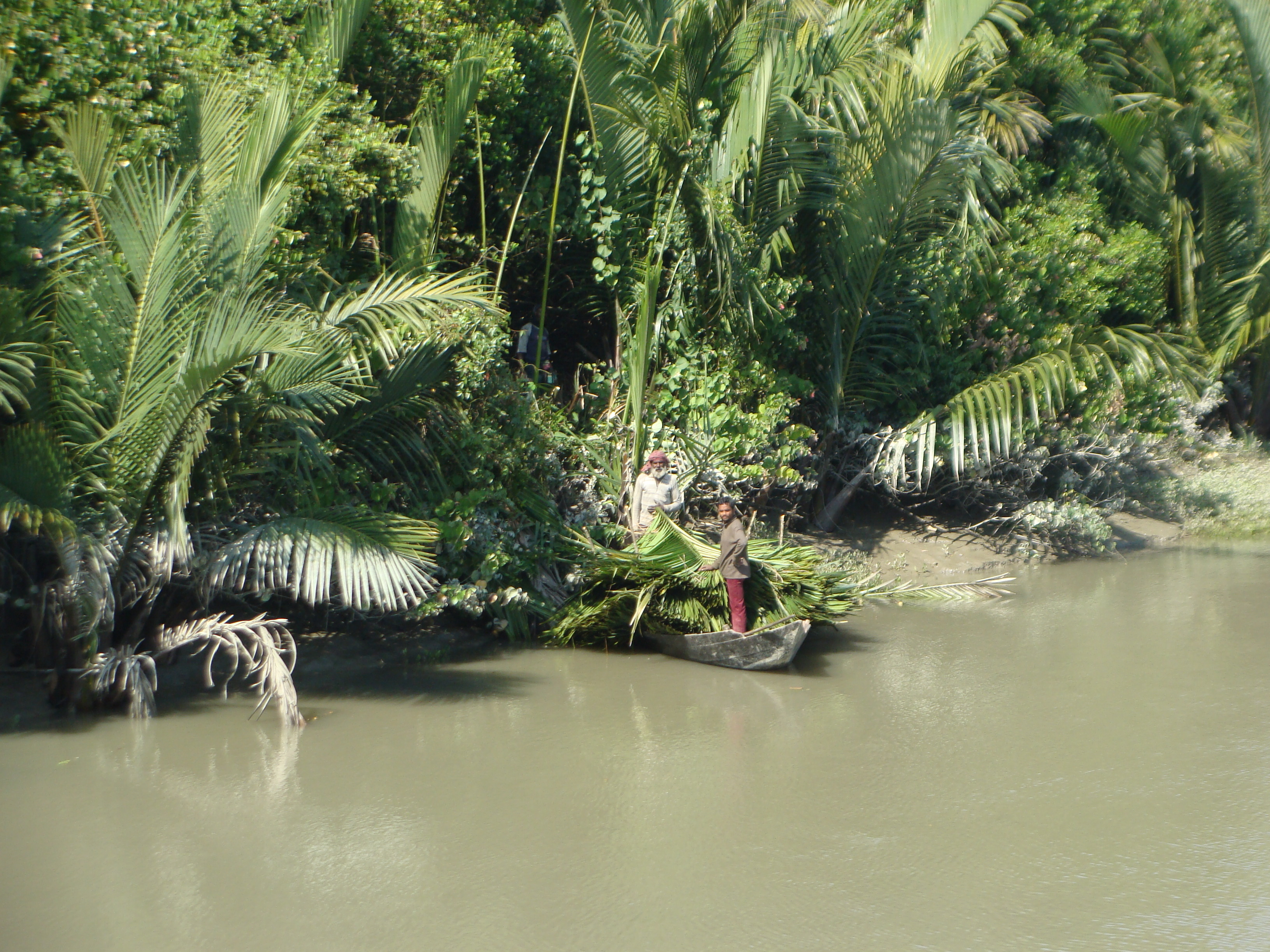
- Nipa palm collection, Sarankhola

- Coordinates: 22°17.5′N 89°47.5′E
- Country: Bangladesh
- Division: Khulna
- District: Bagerhat
- Headquarters: Sarankhola

Area
  - Total: 756.60 km^{2} (292.12 sq mi)

Population (2022)
  - Total: 120,920
  - Density: 159.82/km^{2} (413.93/sq mi)
- Time zone: UTC+6 (BST)
- Postal code: 9330
- Website: sarankhola.bagerhat.gov.bd

Sarankhola Upazila mauza geocode map

Sarankhola (Bengali: শরণখোলা) is an upazila of Bagerhat District in the Division of Khulna, Bangladesh. Sarankhola was formed as a Thana in 1907. A major part of the upazila belongs to the Sundarbans.

== Geography ==
Sarankhola is located at 22.2917°N 89.7917°E. It has 28,581 households and total area 756.60 km^{2}.

It is bounded by Morrelganj upazila on the north, the Bay of Bengal on the south, Mathbaria and Patharghata upazilas on the east, and Mongla upazila on the west.

== Demographics ==
Religions in Sarankhola Upazila (2022)
Religion	Percent
Islam	94.23%
Hinduism	5.76%
Other or not stated	0.01%

According to the 2022 Bangladeshi census, Sarankhola Upazila had 30,765 households and a population of 120,920. 9.73% were under 5 years of age. Sarankhola had a literacy rate of 84.16%: 84.25% for males and 84.08% for females, and a sex ratio of 92.98 males per 100 females. 72,511 (59.96%) lived in urban areas.

As of the 2011 Census of Bangladesh, Sarankhola upazila had 28,581 households and a population of 119,084. 25,803 (21.67%) were under 10 years of age. Sarankhola had an average literacy rate of 58.85%, compared to the national average of 51.8%, and a sex ratio of 908 females per 1000 males. 26,971 (22.65%) of the population lived in urban areas.

As of the 1991 Bangladesh census, Sarankhola had a population of 107,856. Males constituted 51.28% of the population, and females 48.72%. This Upazila's eighteen up population was 52,157. Sarankhola had an average literacy rate of 41.8% (7+ years), and the national average of 32.4% literate.

== Administration ==
Sarankhola Upazila is divided into four union parishads: Dakshinkhali, Dhanshagor, Khontakata, and Rayenda. The union parishads are subdivided into 11 mauzas and 44 villages.

== Notable people ==
- AKM Yusuf, politician

== See also ==
- Upazilas of Bangladesh
- Districts of Bangladesh
- Divisions of Bangladesh
