= Kachua Upazila, Bagerhat =

Kachua কচুয়া
- Upazila
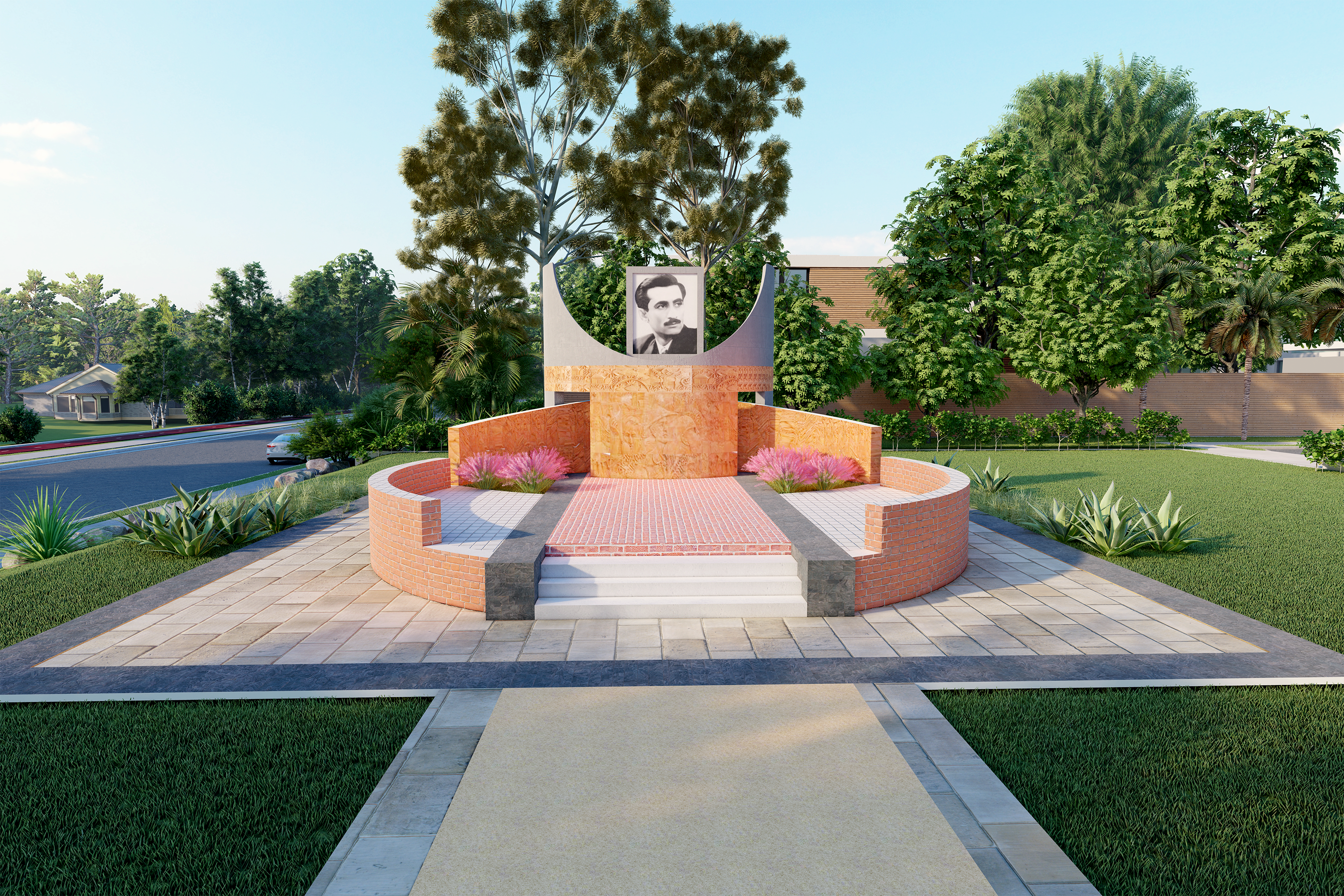
- Mural of Shaheed Sheik Fazlul Haque Moni, Kachua, Bagerhat

- Coordinates: 22°39′N 89°53′E
- Country: Bangladesh
- Division: Khulna
- District: Bagerhat

Area
  - Total: 131.62 km^{2} (50.82 sq mi)

Population (2022)
  - Total: 107,423
  - Density: 816.16/km^{2} (2,113.8/sq mi)
- Time zone: UTC+6 (BST)
- Postal code: 9310

Kachua (Bengali: কচুয়া) is an upazila of Bagerhat District in the Division of Khulna, Bangladesh. Kachua Thana was turned into an upazila in 1983. Distance from Kachua to the district town is 16 km.

== Geography ==
Kachua is located at 22.6500°N 89.8833°E. It has 23,201 households and a total area of 131.62 km^{2}.

The Upazila is bordered by Chitalmari Upazila to the north, Nazirpur and Pirojpur Sadar Upazilas to the east, Bagerhat Sadar Upazila to the west and Morrelganj Upazila to the south. The main rivers are Baleshwar, Bhairab and Bishkhali.

== Demographics ==
Religions in Kachua Upazila (2022)
| Religion | Percent |
| Islam | 83.45% |
| Hinduism | 16.53% |
| Other or not stated | 0.02% |

According to the 2022 Bangladeshi census, Kachua Upazila had 27,401 households and a population of 107,423. 9.13% were under 5 years of age. Kachua had a literacy rate of 81.73%: 82.14% for males and 81.34% for females, with a sex ratio of 95.73 males per 100 females. 12,654 (11.78%) lived in urban areas.

As of the 2011 Census of Bangladesh, Kachua upazila had 23,201 households and a population of 97,011. 19,958 (20.57%) were under 10 years of age. Kachua had an average literacy rate of 56.78%, compared to the national average of 51.8%, and a sex ratio of 1030 females per 1000 males. 9,473 (9.76%) of the population lived in urban areas.

According to the 2001 Bangladesh census, the population was 100,093. Those aged 18 or over was 33675 (males) and 33677 (females). Kachua had an average literacy rate of 61.5% (7+ years), compared to the national average of 32.4%. 76.39% of the population was Muslim, 23.58% Hindu, and 0.03% followed other religions.

== Arts and culture ==
Kachua has a public library, a theatre group, over 20 rural clubs and 34 women's organizations.

== Points of interest ==
Historical landmarks include Moghia raj bari (royal maghiya house) and archaeological heritage Shibpur Shivabari (1300 AD).

There is a raj temple (royal temple) used to worship gods and kings before. Here, Kali, Shyama, and the newly- week worship were. The Hindu people village still has people worship different gods dedabira.

Punno Sanan (borunir bath) is a religious fair attended by more than 50,000 people every year.

During the War of Liberation in 1971 the Razakars killed 42 innocent people at Shakharikathi Hat of Badhal Union. There are two memorials and seven mass graves.

== Administration ==
Kachua Upazila is divided into seven union parishads: Badhal, Dhopakhali, Gazalia, Gopalpur, Kachua, Maghia, and Raripara. The union parishads are subdivided into 77 mauzas and 98 villages.

== Education ==
The average literacy rate of the upazila is 42.5%; males make up 47.5% and females 37.3%. Educational institutions include two colleges, 16 high schools, 8 madrasa, 48 government primary school, and 42 non-government primary schools. Notable institutions include Goalmath Rashikpal High School (1916) and Baraikhali Government Primary School (1918).

== Notable people ==
- Dibbendu Dwip, writer and researcher
