= Mollahat Upazila =

Mollahat মোল্লাহাট
- Upazila
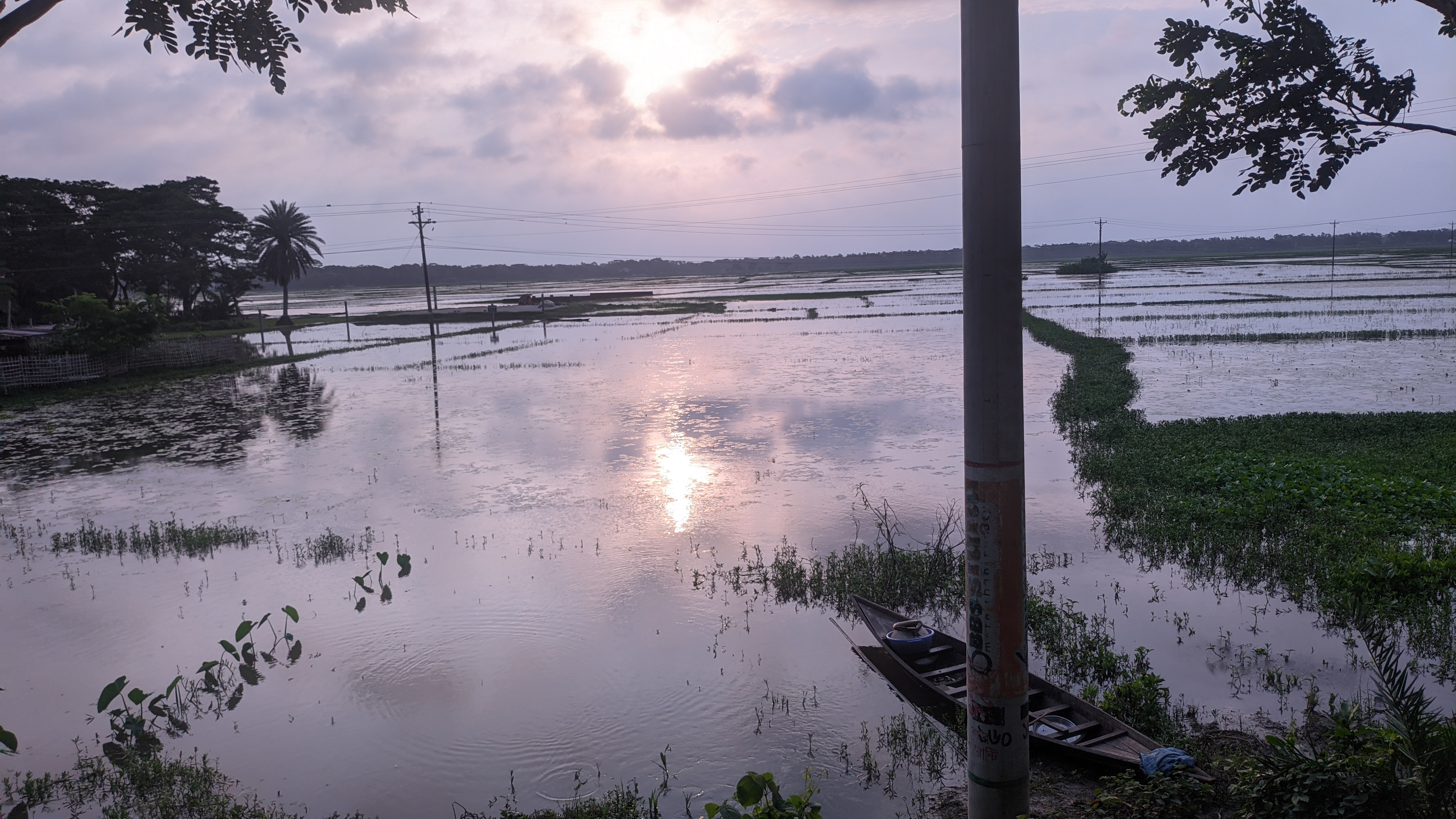
- A lake in Mollahat Upazila

- Coordinates: 22°56.5′N 89°42′E
- Country: Bangladesh
- Division: Khulna
- District: Bagerhat

Area
  - Total: 187.88 km^{2} (72.54 sq mi)

Population (2022)
  - Total: 144,615
  - Density: 769.72/km^{2} (1,993.6/sq mi)
- Time zone: UTC+6 (BST)
- Postal code: 9370
- Area code: 04655
- Website: Official Map of Mollahat

Mollahat Upazila mauza geocode map

Mollahat (Bengali: মোল্লাহাট) is an upazila of Bagerhat District in the Division of Khulna, Bangladesh.

== History ==
Mollahat, established as a Thana in 1967, was turned into an upazila in 1983.

During the War of Liberation (1971), a battle between the freedom fighters and the Pakistani troops was fought at Charkulia in which about 200 Pakistani soldiers including a captain were killed.

There is a War of Liberation Memorial monument at Charkulia.

== Geography ==
Mollahat is located at 22.9417°N 89.7000°E. It has 28,498 households and a total area of 187.88 km^{2}.

The upazila is bounded by the Kalia upazila on the north, Fakirhat and Chitalmari upazilas on the south, Chitalmari, Tungipara, and Gopalganj Sadar upazilas on the east, and Terokhada and Rupsa upazilas on the west. Main rivers in the upazila are Madhumati, Atharbanki, and Chitra; noted depressions are Kenduar Beel and Kodaliar Beel.

== Demographics ==
Religions in Mollahat Upazila (2022)
Religion	Percent
Islam	82.41%
Hinduism	17.53%
Other or not stated	0.06%

According to the 2022 Bangladeshi census, Mollahat Upazila had 34,359 households and a population of 144,615. 10.04% were under 5 years of age. Mollahat had a literacy rate of 77.76%: 78.92% for males and 76.57% for females, and a sex ratio of 102.74 males per 100 females. 31,659 (21.89%) lived in urban areas.

As of the 2011 Census of Bangladesh, Mollahat upazila had 28,498 households and a population of 130,878. 31,474 (24.05%) were under 10 years of age. Mollahat had an average literacy rate of 50.01%, compared to the national average of 51.8%, and a sex ratio of 1007 females per 1000 males. 12,874 (9.84%) of the population lived in urban areas.

According to the 1991 Bangladesh census, Mollahat had a population of 116,729. Males constituted 50.52% of the population, and females 49.48%. The population aged 18 or over was 56,893. Mollahat had an average literacy rate of 31.6% (7+ years), compared to the national average of 32.4%.

Mollahat (Town) consists of 8 mouzas with an area of 8.79 km^{2}. It has a population of 10708; male 51.83%, female 48.17%. The density of population is 1218 per km^{2}. The literacy rate among the town people is 36%. The town has one dakbungalow.

At the 1991 Census, 75.01% of the population were Muslim, 24.87% Hindu and 0.12% followed other religions.

Literacy and educational institutions Average literacy 31.6%; male 36.8% and female 26.2%. Educational institutions: college 3, high school 13, government primary school 58, non-government primary school 19 and madrasa 8, noted of which are Angra Government Primary School (1918) and Madartali Model Government Primary School (1928).

== Points of interest ==
There is a single domed mosque at Kulia union.

== Administration ==
Mollahat Upazila is divided into seven union parishads: Atjuri, Chunkhola, Gangni, Gaola, Kodalia, Kulia, and Udaypur. The union parishads are subdivided into 59 mauzas and 102 villages.

== Religious institutions ==
There are 267 mosques, 72 temples, and 2 churches, the most notable of which are the single-domed mosque and Matiargati temple.

== See also ==
- Upazilas of Bangladesh
- Districts of Bangladesh
- Divisions of Bangladesh
