= Morrelganj Upazila =

Morrelganj মোরেলগঞ্জ
- Upazila
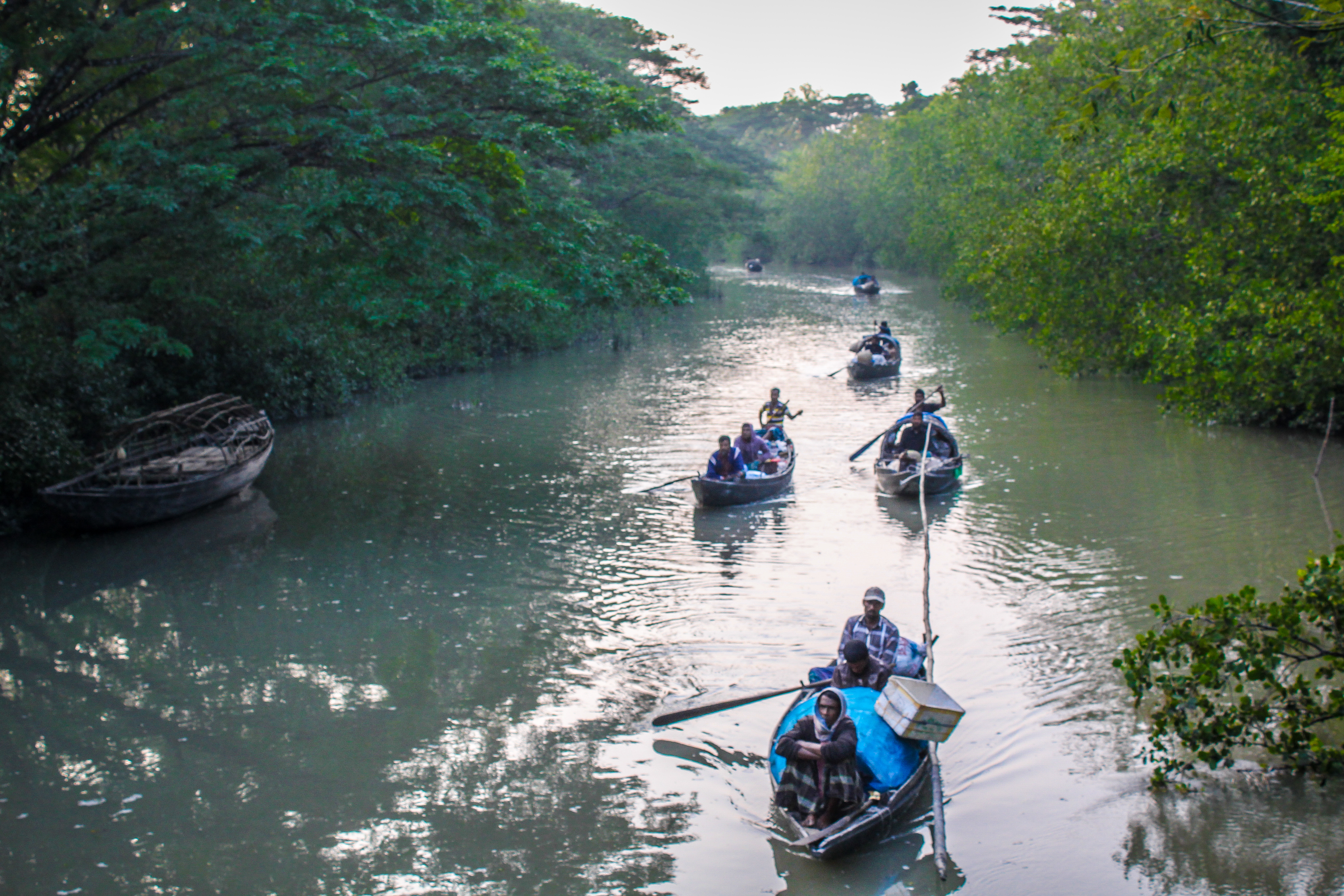
- Sundarbans at Morrelganj

- Coordinates: 22°27′N 89°51.5′E
- Country: Bangladesh
- Division: Khulna
- District: Bagerhat

Government
  - MP: Vacant

Area
  - Total: 460.90 km^{2} (177.95 sq mi)

Population (2022)
  - Total: 304,865
  - Density: 661.46/km^{2} (1,713.2/sq mi)
- Time zone: UTC+6 (BST)
- Postal code: 9320
- Area code: 04656
- Website: Official Map of Morrelganj

Morrelganj Upazila mauza geocode map

Morrelganj (Bengali: মোড়েলগঞ্জ) is an upazila of Bagerhat District in Khulna Division, Bangladesh. Morrelganj thana was established in 1909 and became an upazila in 1985, Morrelganj Municipality was established in 1998.

== History ==
Morrelganj is named after the Morrel family. During the British rule Henry Morrel established Kuthi Bari and terrorized the locals by forced labor and torture. In protest, a peasant rebellion spread under the leadership of Rahimullah of Baraikhali, who was killed on 25 November 1861.

During the Bangladesh War of 1971, 35 people were killed in an encounter between the fighters and the Razakars on 15 August 1971. This is commemorated in the War of Liberation Memorial monument.

== Geography ==
Morrelganj is located at 22.4500°N 89.8583°E. It has 75,968 household units and a total area 460.90 km^{2}.

The upazila is bounded by Bagerhat sadar and Kachua upazilas on the north, Sarankhola and Mathbaria upazilas on the south, Pirojpur sadar and Bhandaria upazilas on the east, Rampal and Mongla upazilas on the west. Main rivers here are: Baleshwar, Ghasiakhali, Panguchi and Bhola.

== Demographics ==
Religions in Morrelganj Upazila (2022)
Religion	Percent
Islam	90.47%
Hinduism	9.53%
Other or not stated	0.00%

According to the 2022 Bangladeshi census, Morrelganj Upazila had 80,281 households and a population of 304,865. 9.18% were under 5 years of age. Morrelganj had a literacy rate of 81.73%: 82.50% for males and 81.02% for females, and a sex ratio of 92.97 males per 100 females. 44,549 (14.62%) lived in urban areas.

As of the 2011 Census of Bangladesh, Morrelganj upazila had 75,968 households and a population of 294,576. 65,928 (22.38%) were under 10 years of age. Morrelganj had an average literacy rate of 60.67%, compared to the national average of 51.8%, and a sex ratio of 1056 females per 1000 males. 27,130 (9.21%) of the population lived in urban areas.

In 1991, Morrelganj upazila had a population of 321,153; males constituted 50.48% and females 49.52%; Muslims 86.59%, Hindus 13.28% and others 0.13%. 460.91 km^{2}

Morrelganj (the town) consists of nine wards and twelve mahallas. The area of the town is 15.36 km^{2}. The upazila has a population of 321,153; male 51.76%, female 48.24%. The population density is 1441 people per square km. The town has a Dak bungalow.

== Economy ==
The main occupations are: Agriculture 35.49%, fishing 3.65%, agricultural labourer 20.73%, wage labourer 6.85%, commerce 11.85%, transport 1.4%, service 5.6%, others 14.43%.

== Administration ==
Morrelganj Upazila is divided into Morrelganj Municipality and 16 union parishads: Baharbunia, Balaibunia, Banagram, Baraikhali, Chingrakhali, Daibagnyahati, Hoglabunia, Hogla Pasha, Jiudhara, Khuolia, Morrelganj, Nishanbaria, Panchakaran, Putikhali, Ramchandrapur, and Teligati. The union parishads are subdivided into 120 mauzas and 181 villages.

Morrelganj Municipality is subdivided into 9 wards and 12 mahallas.

== Transport ==
Roads: Paved (pucca) 59 km, improved (semi pucca) 82 km and mud road 765 km. The traditional use of the palanquin for transportation is nearly extinct.

== Notable people ==
- Shahid Rahimullah, leader of Indigo Revolt
- Liakat Ali Khan, student freedom fighter commander in 1971
- Mohammad Ruhul Amin, Police Superintendent in Charge of the region in 1996 who helped clean-up river pirates in the Mongla rivers to practically zero

== See also ==
- Upazilas of Bangladesh
- Districts of Bangladesh
- Divisions of Bangladesh
- Administrative geography of Bangladesh
