= Bagerhat District =

Bagerhat District বাগেরহাট জেলা
- District
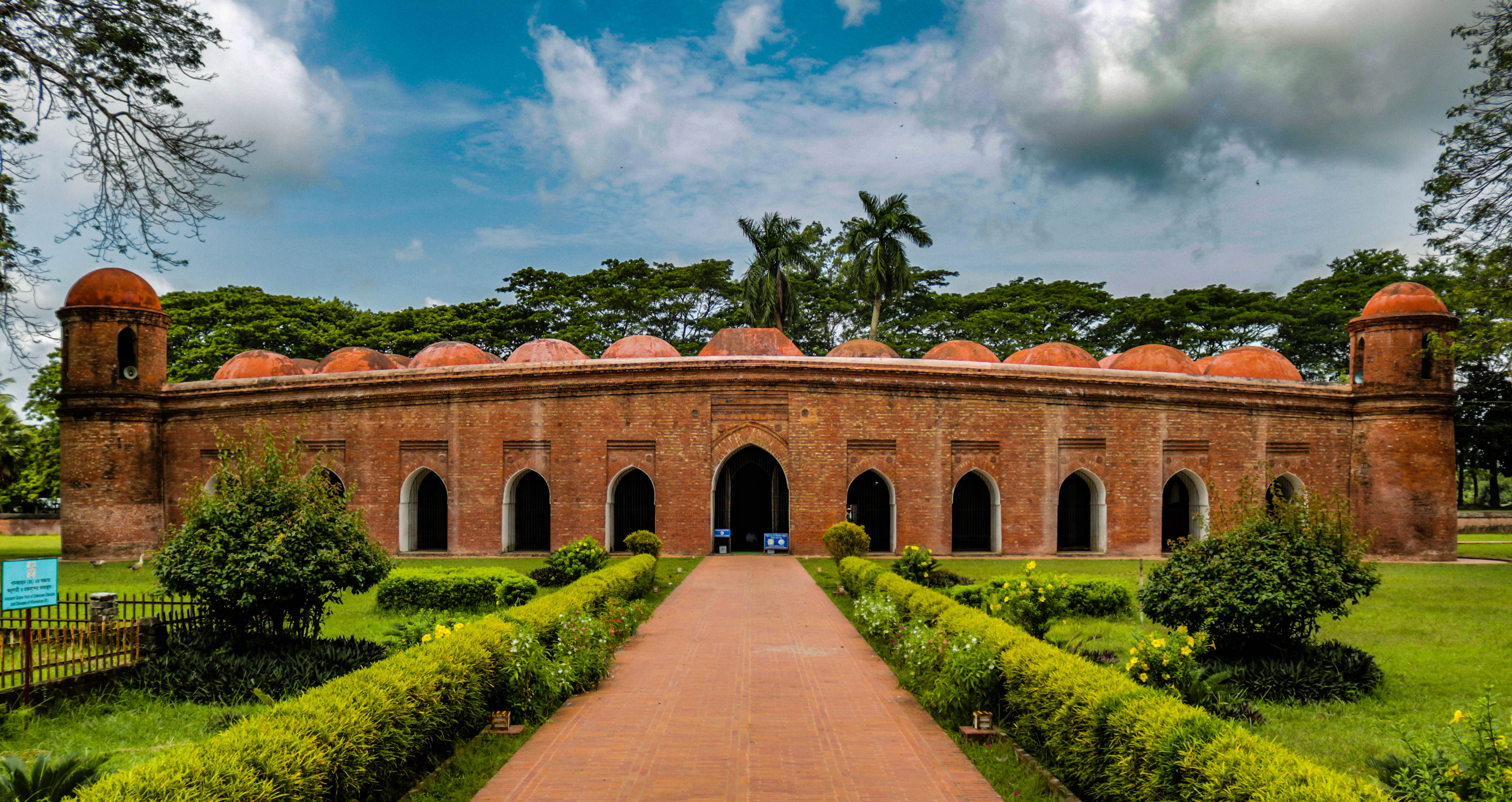
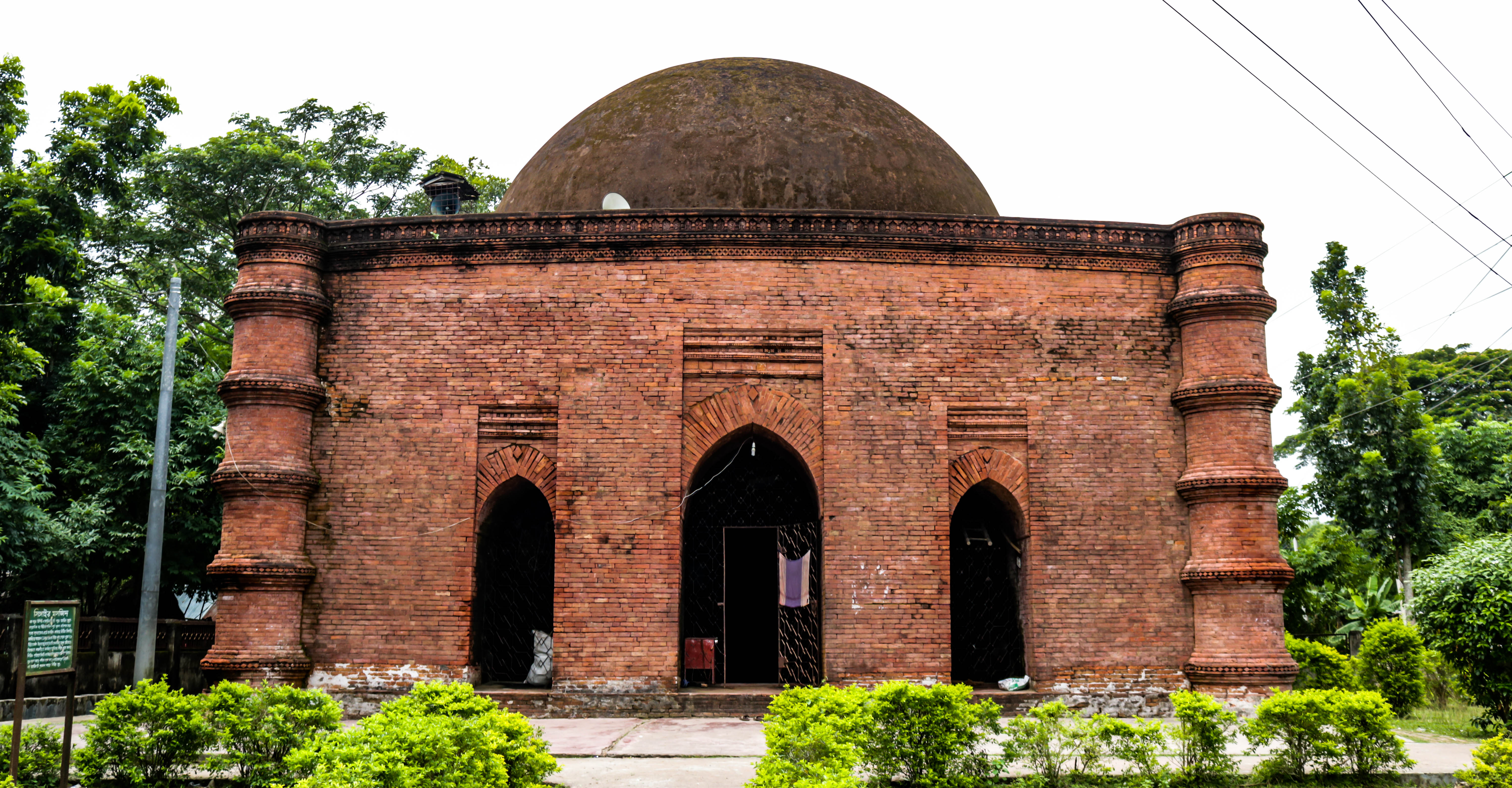
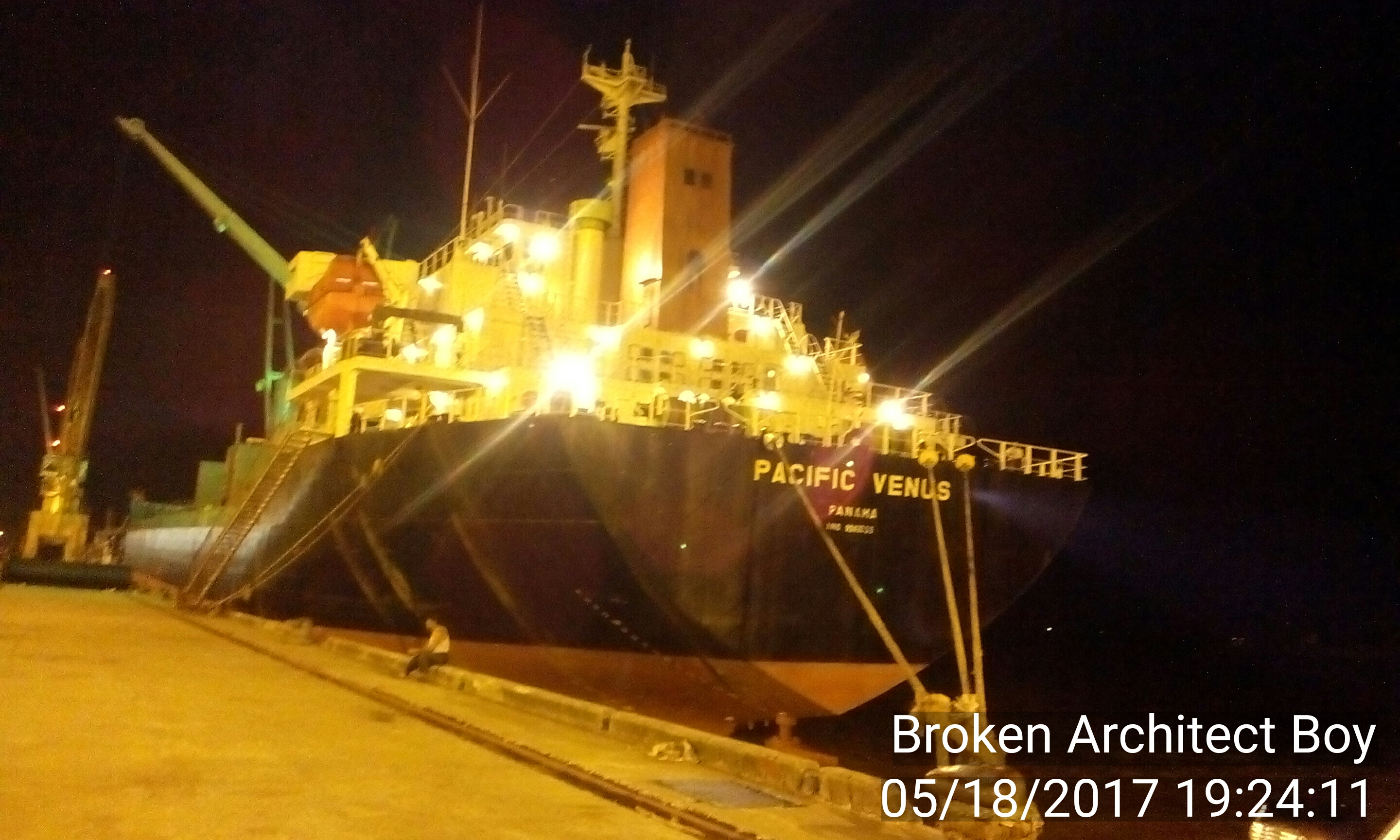
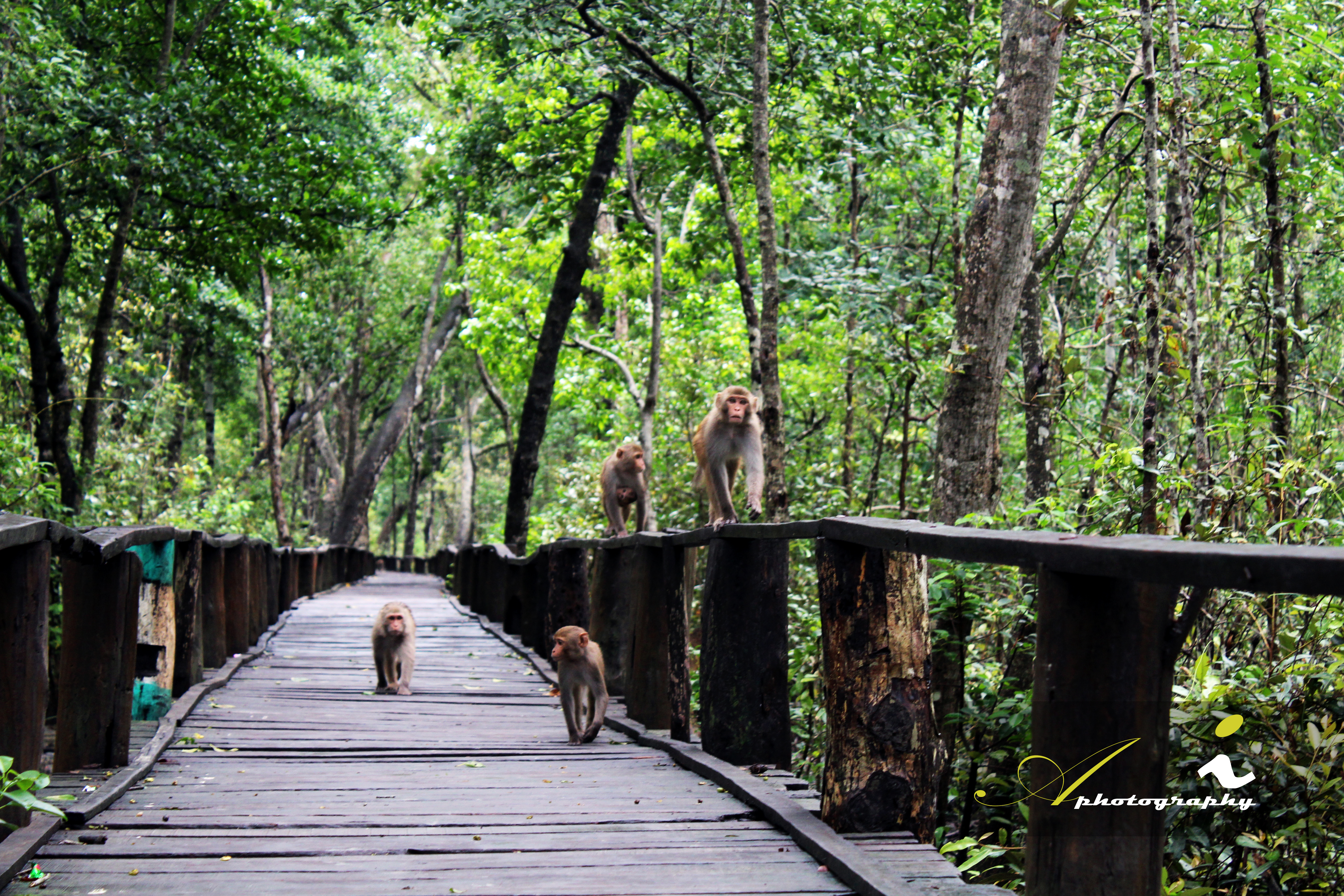
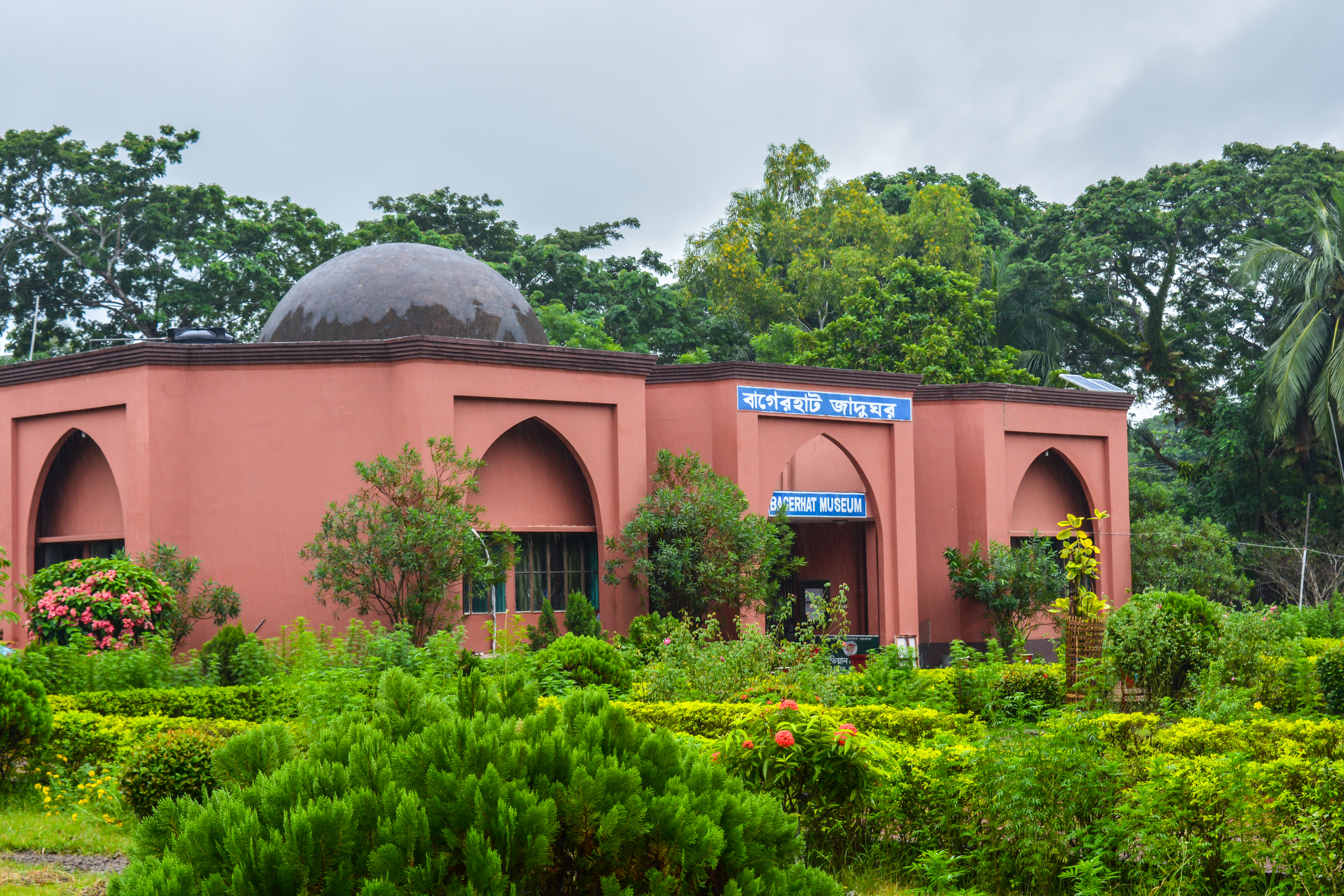
- From top: Sixty Dome Mosque, Singar Mosque, Mongla Port, Karamjal point of Sundarbans, Bagerhat Museum
- Interactive map of Bagerhat District
- Coordinates: 22°40′00″N 89°48′00″E
- Country: Bangladesh
- Division: Khulna Division
- Capital: Bagerhat

Government
  - Deputy Commissioner: Golam Md. Baten

Area
  - Total: 3,959.11 km^{2} (1,528.62 sq mi)
- Elevation: 2 m (6.6 ft)

Population (2022)
  - Total: 1,613,076
  - Density: 407.434/km^{2} (1,055.25/sq mi)
- Time zone: UTC+06:00 (BST)
- Postal code: 9300
- Area code: 0468
- ISO 3166 code: BD-05
- HDI (2019): 0.649 medium · 4th of 20

UNESCO World Heritage Site
- Official name: Mosque City of Bagerhat
- Type: Religious
- Reference no.
- Region: Southern Asia

Bagerhat District (Bengali: বাগেরহাট জেলা) is a district in south-western Bangladesh. It is a part of Khulna Division.

== Geography ==
Bagerhat district has a total area of 44,959.11 square kilometres.it is good. It is bounded by Gopalganj District and Narail District on the north, The Bay of Bengal on the south, Gopalganj District, Pirojpur District and Barguna District on the east and Khulna District on the west. The main rivers of the district are the Panguchi, Daratana, Madhumati River, Pasur River, Haringhata, Mongla River, Baleshwar, Bangra and Goshairkhali.

== History ==
Bagerhat city is famous for its mosques. Muslim saint Khan Jahan Ali founded this town. He was a saint of the 15th century, possibly of Turkic origin. At the time of his reign, Bagerhat was a part of the Sundarbans. He cleared the forest and made it habitable. He named it "Khalifatabad". He erected many official buildings to run his administration. He also built many mosques and dug tanks. The buildings erected by him are now all in ruins. The city of Bagerhat has been given the status of a World Heritage Site by UNESCO in 1973.

Khan was a military general that was appointed to be the leader of the city and was greatly respected. Some people even viewed him as a god-like being. He had a deep connection to this land because of his journey from Barobazar to the Bagerhat District where along the way he created roads and river networks later developing an entire community and being a leader. In his practice of Sufism, he was recognized for his ability to convert locals to his personal beliefs. It is still questioned what his true intentions were in establishing the mosque city. But most people believe that he wanted to bring people to this place away from all that is negative and find true peace. Khan is looked up to even today in Bangladesh and archaeologists have developed monuments for him.

His first settlement in Barobazar was a Hindu-Buddhist town named Champanagar, which was named after the saints that came before him. This speaks of the relationship Khan had with the religious figures that came before and after his time and the respect they all shared for each other. The tomb of General Khan lies in the only building today that has the original dome architecture of the mosque city. The tomb is surrounded by circular towers and stone casting that prevent moisture from the ground. The floor is decorated in colorful and geometric tiles with quotes from the Quran. An annual fair is also held around the area of the tomb for Muslims and Hindus on the anniversary of death and the full moon.

The area was chosen specifically based on the vast water resources and kind climate that were perfect for sustaining life and communities. The delta from the many rivers (Ganga, Brahmaputra, Meghna, etc.) created fertile soil for growing crops. This encouraged people to migrate to this area and create wealth for themselves. The site was dominated by the industries of agriculture and trade. Cotton and cloth were the primary exports for the area to be traded out of their port. Rice, betel leaf, betel nut, and coconut are other crops that came out of the fertile soil of Bagerhat.

This religious site was known to be sacred, and some believed it supernatural. People would come to drink the water from the man-made pond for its healing properties. The concept is similar to the idea of a fountain of youth or a utopia. Another supernatural belief was that General Khan used supernatural powers to create the structures because it was hard to understand how they were built at the time.

After the death of the founder, the city was abandoned and eventually covered in thick vegetation which is why the site was hidden for so long and difficult to explore. The site is significant because it was an iconic area for Islamic teachings at the time and can teach much about Islam and people in general in the 15th century. As many religious figures traveled to India and formed connections, several returned to the Bagerhat District to teach at the mosques. Geographically, the city sits on top of farmland and is surrounded by palm trees on the banks of the Bhairab river.

The city started because of the rapid growth of conversion to Islam in the area. This was a result of mass immigration and a large number of Muslim missionaries in the area. The architectural inspiration for the city came from Bengali, Persian, and Arab styles. While the mosques stand out, the city also included mausoleums, bridges, water networks, and buildings for public gatherings.

After the death of General Khan, the city was renamed Khalifatabad by Sultan Ghiyasuddin Mahmud Shah. This can make the research process of the lost city more confusing and can be easily misinterpreted as two separate places. However, it is often easy to link the two together by seeing that they were both funded by the same person in the same place. The two names divide the historical timeline into two parts based on the series of leaders that controlled the mosque city.

Located at the confluence of two historical rivers, the Brahmaputra River and the Ganges, Bagerghat is also known as the Mosque City for the presence of a large number of mosques in the district. The domed structures of the mosques built with bricks in the 15th century are considered an architectural marvel.

Bagerhat was declared a district in 1984. The district today is the fourth largest district in Bangladesh based on area.

== Demographics ==
Historical population
Year	Pop.	±% p.a.
1974	1,027,160	—
1981	1,203,551	+2.29%
1991	1,431,332	+1.75%
2001	1,549,031	+0.79%
2011	1,476,090	−0.48%
2022	1,613,076	+0.81%

According to the 2022 Bangladeshi census, Bagerhat District had 408,840 households and a population of 1,613,076. The population density was 407 people per km^{2}. Bagerhat District had a literacy rate (age 7 and over) of 81.42%, compared to the national average of 74.80%, and a sex ratio of 98.97 males per 100 females. 279,751 (17.34%) inhabitants were under 10 years of age. Approximately, 23.88% of the population lived in urban areas. The ethnic population was 1,046.

=== Religion ===
Religions in Bagerhat District (2022)
Religion	Percent
Islam	83.24%
Hinduism	16.38%
Christianity	0.37%

The district of Bagerhat includes 7,815 mosques, 238 temples, 17 churches and seven tombs. The Sixty Domes Mosque or Shat Gambuj Masjid is famous mosque. Khan Jahan Ali's tomb is the famous tombs. Islam is the major religion with 83.25% population, while Hindus constitute 16.38% of the population.

Religion in present-day Bagerhat District
Religion	1941 (Note: 1941 figures are for Bagerhat subdivision of Khulna district, excluding territory in Sundarbans Forest thana (which is less than 7000 people for the entire Khulna district))		1981		1991		2001		2011		2022	
Religion	Pop.	%	Pop.	%	Pop.	%	Pop.	%	Pop.	%	Pop.	%
Islam	329,310	53.77%	865,471	71.91%	1,108,673	77.46%	1,237,862	79.91%	1,198,593	81.20%	1,342,836	83.25%
Hinduism	280,851	45.85%	332,385	27.62%	315,720	22.06%	304,427	19.65%	270,874	18.35%	264,229	16.38%
Christianity	1,991	0.33%	4,740	0.39%	6,023	0.42%	6,261	0.40%	6,115	0.41%	5,890	0.37%
Others (Note: Including Jainism, Christianity, Buddhism, Zoroastrianism, Judaism, Ad-Dharmis, or not stated)	338	0.05%	956	0.08%	916	0.06%	481	0.04%	508	0.04%	121	0.00%
Total Population	612,490	100%	1,203,551	100%	1,431,332	100%	1,549,031	100%	1,476,090	100%	1,613,076	100%

Bagerhat used to have nearly 30% Hindus in 1981, but Hindus have been leaving the district in large numbers since then and the proportion has reduced to 16%. There is a population of 5,900 Christians in the district, mainly in Mongla upazila.

== Economy ==
Port of Mongla, which is a port of Khulna city and one of the two main sea ports of Bangladesh, is geographically located in Bagerhat District. Rampal and Fakirhat, two upazilas of Bagerhat, are renowned in Bangladesh due to their huge production of shrimp and a big amount of foreign exchange through the city of Khulna.

== Points of interest ==
- Ramakrishna Ashrama
- Mosque city of Bagerhat
- Shait Gambuz Mosque
- Sona Mosque
- Khan Jahan Ali's tomb Complex
- Khan Jahan Ali's Tank
- Port of Mongla
- Sundarban
- Ghora Dighi
- Kodla Math or Ayudha Math
- Durgapur Shiva Math
- Sundarban Resort, Barakpur
- Chandramahol, Ronjitpur
- Dohajari Shib Bari, Fakirhat

== Administration ==
Bagerhat District upazila geocode map

Bagerhat is divided into 9 upazilas, 78 union parishads, 1031 villages, 689 mouzas, 3 municipalities, 28 wards and 57 mahallas. The upazilas are:

- Bagerhat Sadar Upazila
- Chitalmari Upazila
- Fakirhat Upazila
- Kachua Upazila
- Mollahat Upazila
- Mongla Upazila
- Morrelganj Upazila
- Rampal Upazila
- Sarankhola Upazila

Administrator of Zila Porishod: Sheikh Kamruzzaman (Tuku)

Deputy Commissioner (DC): Muhammad Azizur Rahman, BPAA

== Transport ==
Once upon a time there were train communication between Bagerhat and Khulna. The best way to go to Bagerhat from Dhaka is to take a bus which takes three to five hours. By air one has to go to Jessore airport then take a bus to the city.

=== Telecommunication ===
Telecommunications:

- Teletalk, BTCL, Bangla Link, Grameen Phone, Robi etc.

== Media ==
Print media:

- The Daily Star (National)
- Prothom Alo (National)
- Kaler Kantho (National)
- The Daily Jugantar (National)
- The Daily Janakantha (National)
- Daily Purbanchal (Local)
- Daily Inkilab (National)

== See also ==
- Districts of Bangladesh
- Khulna Division
- Upazilas of Bangladesh
- Districts of Bangladesh
- Divisions of Bangladesh
- Upazila
- Thana
