= MAH Selim =

Bangladeshi politician

M.A.H. Salim
- এমএএইচ সেলিম

Member of Parliament for Bagerhat-2
- In office 28 October 2001 – 27 October 2006
- Preceded by: Mir Shakawat Ali Daru
- Succeeded by: Mir Showkat Ali Badsha

Personal details
- Party: Bangladesh Nationalist Party

M.A.H. Selim, also known as Silver Selim, is a Bangladeshi Industrialist, Freedom Fighter and Politician of the Bangladesh Nationalist Party.He was elected as a Member of Parliament for Bagerhat-2. in 2001.

== Early life ==
Selim was born in Mukkhait Village in Bagerhat Sadar Upazila of Bagerhat District. He was raised in Bagerhat and entered local politics in the late 1990s.

== Involvement in Liberation War (1971) ==
In 1971, he participated in the Bangladesh Liberation War.

== Political career ==
Selim served as the President of the Bagerhat District Unit of the Bangladesh Nationalist Party and was elected as Member of Parliament in 2001 from Bagerhat-2. He defeated his primary rival Sheikh Helal Uddin of the Awami League.

During his tenure as Member of Parliament, Selim oversaw several infrastructure and educational projects in Bagerhat such as:

- Construction of the Muniganj Bridge, Town Protection Embankment and City Defense Dam.
- Establishment of the Majeda Begum Agricultural Technology College and the Belayet Hossain Degree College.During his tenure as MP he became close to Chairman of the Bangladesh Nationalist Party and Prime Minister Tarique Rahman, former Home Minister Lutfozzaman Babar and businessman Giasuddin Al Mamun. Following the end of his parliamentary term in 2006 and Bangladesh Nationalist Party's exist from power Selim resigned from the position of President of Bagerhat District Bangladesh Nationalist Party.For the next 18 years Selim was distant from politics.

=== Return to Politics ===
Following Prime Minister Sheikh Hasina's Resignation in August 2024, Selim made a return to politics and in the 2026 General Election he contested from Bagerhat-1, Bagerhat-2 and Bagerhat-3.

== Business career ==
Selim serves as the Managing Director of Silver Line Group and Chairman of One Entertainment Limited, parent organization of Channel 1. He was elected as the President of Bangladesh Association of International Recruiting Agencies first in 2002 and again in 2006.

== Controversies ==
=== 2003 Alleged Involvement in Murder of Sramik League Leader ===
On November 22, 2003, President of Teligati Union Unit of Bangladesh Nationalist Party, Ashraf Ali, General Secretary of Teligati Union Unit of Bangladesh Nationalist Party Alamgir Hossain and Joint Secretary Teligati Union Unit of Bangladesh Nationalist Party Akram Hossain were expelled from Bangladesh Nationalist Party in association with their names as accused in the First Information Report over the murder of President of Bagerhat District Sramik League Sadekul Islam. Local Awami League leaders claimed that the expulsion was an eyewash and that Selim was the 'Godfather of the killers'. They also threatened to declare Selim persona non grata if the accused in the FIR were not handed over to police.

=== Alleged 2005 Allegations of Threats to Journalists ===
On February 9, 2005 Reporters Without Borders alleged that 7 Journalists received identical letters threatening to break their hands and legs and that Members of the Ahle Hadith Andolon would be used to carry out the threats if they continued to write critical reports on Selim. RWB alleged that all of the Journalists had reported that two young sisters were tortured in an unoccupied house belonging to Selim. The organization stated that "We call on the authorities to devote all the necessary resources to investigating this case. It is vital that measures are taken against those responsible for these threats so that journalists can work normally." The organization further alleged that Bagerhat Press Club General Secretary Babul Sarder filed a complaint about the threats at the city's police station and demanded police protection. The police promised to investigate the case.

=== 2007 Land Grabbing Case ===
On June 3, 2007 Bangladesh Police reported that Sramik Dal leader Mina Raqibul Hasan Milon filed a case with Sadar Police Station against Selim accusing him of grabbing his land and establishing a Private university on his land. Selim was later arrested on March 7, 2007.

=== 2008 Corruption Case ===
On 6 December 2007 ACC Assistant Director Ali Akbar filed a case with Gulshan Police Station against MAH Selim and members of his family. In the First Information Report, the complainant alleged that Selim concealed information about assets worth BDT 12.38 crore in the wealth statement submitted to the Anti-Corruption Commission and accumulated Bangladeshi taka 62.96 crore through illegal means. Investigation found that Selim and his family members had concealed information about assets worth BDT22,06,69,937 in their wealth statements submitted to the commission and had amassed BDT 73,16,14,693 illegally.

On 9 June 2008 Anti-Corruption Commission Assistant Director Shamsul Alam submitted a charge sheet against Selim and his family members submitted the charge sheet to the Chief Metropolitan Magistrate's Court of Dhaka showing 61 people as prosecution witnesses. Others accused in the chargesheet were Selim's wife Amena Begum, son Mehedi Hasan and daughter Sahara Selim. Amena Begum, Sahara Selim and Mehedi Hassan were reported to be absconding, and the Investigating Officer of the case requested the court to issue arrest warrants against them and to order the attachment of their properties.

=== 2008 Extortion Case ===
On 3 June 2008 Judge Mohammad Shafiul Azam of the Sixth Assistant Sessions Judge's Court delivered judgment against Selim, fining him BDT 50,000, with an additional two-month imprisonment if the fine was not paid. Earlier, the prosecution and defense presented their arguments, and the court had recorded statements from 18 testifying witnesses. Selim had previously been sentenced to 7 years of Imprisonment in another case filed for allegedly extorting BDT 12 lakh from the same individual. The cases were filed by Zahidul Islam Faruq, proprietor of Faruq Construction Firm Ltd, with Gulshan Police Station on 10 June 2007 alleging that Selim demanded BDT 50 lakh and BDT 12 lakh as the complainant secured a contract for a Local Government Development Engineering (LGED) Project According to the complainant, he had no choice but to comply with Selim's pressure, making payments via cheques for BDT 10 lakh and BDT 12 lakh. Selim was arrested on 7 March 2008 under Section 16(2) of the Emergency Power Rules. He has since faced nine criminal cases in Bagerhat and two extortion, one tax evasion, and one graft case filed against him at Gulshan Police Station.

== Electoral History ==
Year	Constituency	Party	Votes	%	Result
2001	Bagerhat-2	Bangladesh Nationalist Party	103,792	57.50	Won
2026	Bagerhat-2	Independent	48,961	14.62	Lost

== Personal life ==
Selim is married to Amena Begum. They have 2 sons and 1 daughter, Mehdi Hasan who serves as Deputy Managing Director of Silver Line Group, Samith Hasan who also serves as Deputy Managing Director of Silver Line Group and Sahara Salim who serves as a Director of Silver Line Group.
