= Bagerhat-2 =

Constituency of Bangladesh's Jatiya Sangsad

Coordinates: 22.66°N 89.77°E

- Constituency for the Jatiya Sangsad
- District: Bagerhat District
- Division: Khulna Division
- Electorate: 338,009 (2026)

Current constituency
- Created: 1984
- Party: Bangladesh Jamaat-e-Islami
- Member: Shaikh Monzurul Haque Rahad
- Created from: Khulna-2
- ← 95 Bagerhat-1 97 Bagerhat-3 →

Bagerhat-2 is a constituency represented in the Jatiya Sangsad (National Parliament) of Bangladesh since 2026 by Shaikh Monzurul Haque Rahad of the Bangladesh Jamaat-e-Islami.

== Boundaries ==
The constituency encompasses Bagerhat Sadar and Kachua upazilas.

== History ==
The constituency was created in 1984 from the Khulna-2 constituency when the former Khulna District was split into three districts: Bagerhat, Khulna, and Satkhira.

In 2025, the Election Commission announced that it would reduce the number of constituencies in Bagerhat District from four to three. They said they were evening out voters per constituency to ensure balanced representation. Their redistricting would have moved Fakirhat Upazila from Bagerhat-1 to Bagerhat-2, Bagerhat Sadar Upazila from Bagerhat-2 to Bagerhat-1, Kachua Upazila from Bagerhat-2 to Bagerhat-3, Rampal and Mongla upazilas from Bagerhat-3 to Bagerhat-2, and Morrelganj and Sarankhola upazilas from Bagerhat-4 to Bagerhat-3. Locals objected to the changes.

The High Court found that eliminating Bagerhat-4 solely because of low population was unsound and not supported by demographic data. They invalidated the changes, and their decision was upheld on appeal. So the 2026 general election went ahead with the long-standing constituency boundaries.

== Members of Parliament ==
Election	Member	Party
1986	Sheikh Abdur Rahman	Jatiya Party
1988	Sheikh Sahidul Islam	Independent
1991	A. S. M. Mustafizur Rahman	Bangladesh Nationalist Party
Feb 1996	A. S. M. Mustafizur Rahman	Bangladesh Nationalist Party
Jun 1996	Mir Shakawat Ali Daru	Awami League
2001	MAH Salim	Bangladesh Nationalist Party
2008	Mir Showkat Ali Badsha	Awami League
2014	Mir Showkat Ali Badsha	Awami League
2018	Sheikh Tonmoy	Awami League
2024	Sheikh Tonmoy	Awami League
2026	Shaikh Monzurul Haque Rahad	Bangladesh Jamaat-e-Islami

== Elections ==
=== Elections in the 2020s ===
General Election 2026: Bagerhat-2
Party	Candidate	Votes	%	±%
Jamaat	Shaikh Monzurul Haque Rahad	117,709	49.6	N/A
BNP	Sheikh Mohammad Zakir Hossain	66,409	28.0	N/A
Independent	MAH Selim	48,965	20.6	N/A
IAB	Sheikh Atiar Rahman	4,313	1.8	N/A
Majority		51,300	21.6	N/A
Turnout		237,396	70.2	N/A
Jamaat gain from AL				

=== Elections in the 2010s ===
Mir Showkat Ali Badsha was elected unopposed in the 2014 general election after opposition parties withdrew their candidacies in a boycott of the election.

=== Elections in the 2000s ===
General Election 2008: Bagerhat-2
Party	Candidate	Votes	%	±%
AL	Mir Showkat Ali Badsha	103,846	50.8	+9.6
BNP	M. A. Salam	95,954	46.9	−10.6
IAB	Md. Jalal Uddin Hawlader	3,470	1.7	N/A
LDP	Chasi AM Saidur Rahman	1,240	0.6	N/A
Majority		7,892	3.9	−12.4
Turnout		204,510	89.0	+6.7
AL gain from BNP				

General Election 2001: Bagerhat-2
Party	Candidate	Votes	%	±%
BNP	MAH Salim	103,792	57.5	+22.3
AL	Sheikh Helal Uddin	74,429	41.2	+2.0
IJOF	Farid Hasan	1,436	0.8	N/A
Independent	Moqbul Hossain Sheikh	238	0.1	N/A
Independent	S. M. A. Mannan	169	0.1	N/A
JSD	Md. Emadul Haq Munzil	121	0.1	N/A
CPB	S. M. Rezaul Karim	99	0.1	N/A
Independent	Arefin Islam	69	0.0	N/A
Independent	Sheikh Dabir Uddin	57	0.0	N/A
Bangladesh Sarbahara Party	Md. Mosarraf Hossain	44	0.0	N/A
Majority		29,363	16.3	+12.2
Turnout		180,454	82.3	+0.3
BNP gain from AL				

=== Elections in the 1990s ===
General Election June 1996: Bagerhat-2
Party	Candidate	Votes	%	±%
AL	Mir Shakawat Ali Daru	57,377	39.2	+2.7
BNP	A. S. M. Mustafizur Rahman	51,448	35.2	−2.5
Jamaat	Sheikh Kamrul Alam	26,805	18.3	−3.2
JP(E)	Sheikh Atiar Rahman	8,450	5.8	+2.5
IOJ	Md. Muzibur Rahman Juktibadi	1,214	0.8	N/A
Zaker Party	Sayad Sirajul Kabir	644	0.4	−0.3
Independent	M. A. Awal	236	0.2	N/A
FP	S. M. Abdul Mannan	82	0.1	N/A
Independent	Fakir Md. Ali Hasan	53	0.0	N/A
Majority		5,929	4.1	+3.0
Turnout		146,309	82.0	+20.7
AL gain from BNP				

General Election 1991: Bagerhat-2
Party	Candidate	Votes	%	±%
BNP	A. S. M. Mustafizur Rahman	48,081	37.7	
AL	Mir Shakawat Ali Daru	46,652	36.5	
Jamaat	Mojibur Rahman	27,508	21.5	
JP(E)	Sheikh Abdur Rahman	4,209	3.3	
Zaker Party	Haniful Haq	843	0.7	
Bangladesh Muslim League (Kader)	Fazlur Rahman	266	0.2	
Jatiya Samajtantrik Dal-JSD	Sheik Kamruzzaman	105	0.1	
Majority		1,429	1.1	
Turnout		127,664	61.3	
BNP gain from JP(E)				
