= Syed Mojahidur Rahman =

Bangladeshi politician

Member of Parliament from Undivided Khulna-1
- In office 1979–1982
- Preceded by: M. A. Khair
- Succeeded by: Sheikh Harunur Rashid

Personal details
- Party: Jatiya Party (Ershad)
- Other political affiliations: Bangladesh Nationalist Party

Syed Mojahidur Rahman is a Bangladeshi politician and a former member of parliament for undivided Khulna-1 (current Bagerhat-1).

== Career ==
Rahman was elected to parliament from Khulna-1 as a Bangladesh Nationalist Party candidate in 1979. He then joined the Jatiya Party. He lost the Jatiya Sangsad elections of 1986 Bagerhat-1 constituency with the nomination of Jatiya Party.
