= Aftab Uddin Howlader =

Bangladeshi politician

Member of Parliament Undivided from Khulna-3
- In office 1979–1986
- Preceded by: Mir Sakhawat Ali
- Succeeded by: Hasina Banu Shirin

Member of Parliament from Bagerhat-3
- In office 1986–1990
- Preceded by: Seats start
- Succeeded by: Talukder Abdul Khaleque

Personal details
- Party: Jatiya Party (Ershad)
- Other political affiliations: Bangladesh Nationalist Party

Aftab Uddin Howlader is a Jatiya Party (Ershad) politician and a former member of parliament for Khulna-3 and Bagerhat-3.

== Career ==
Howlader was elected to parliament from undivided Khulna-3 as a Bangladesh Nationalist Party candidate in 1979. He was elected to parliament from Bagerhat-3 as a Jatiya Party candidate in 1986 and 1988.
