= Altaf Hussain =

Altaf Hussain may refer to:

- Altaf Hussain (Pakistani politician)
- Altaf Hussain (Welsh politician)
- Altaf Hussain (East Pakistan cricketer)
- Altaf Hussain Hali (1837–1914), Indian Urdu poet
- Altaf Husain, East Pakistani educationist, journalist and Pakistan Movement activist
- Md. Altaf Hossain, Bangladeshi academic
- Altaf Hossain (politician)
