= Sheikh Mujibur Rahman (Bagerhat politician) =

Bangladesh Nationalist Party politician

- শেখ মুজিবুর রহমান

Member of Parliament
- In office 15 February 1996 – 12 June 1996
- Preceded by: Mozammel Hossain
- Succeeded by: Sheikh Hasina
- Constituency: Bagerhat-1

Personal details
- Party: Bangladesh Nationalist Party

Sheikh Mujibur Rahman is a Bangladesh Nationalist Party politician. He was elected a member of parliament from Bagerhat-1 in February 1996.

== Career ==
Prafulla Kumar Mandal was elected to parliament from Bagerhat-1 as a Bangladesh Nationalist Party candidate in the 15 February 1996 Bangladeshi general election.

He was defeated for the Bagerhat-1 constituency on 12 June 1996 and in 2001 on the nomination of the Bangladesh Nationalist Party.
