= Hasina Banu Shirin =

Bangladeshi politician

Member of Bangladesh Parliament
- In office 1986–1986
- Preceded by: Ashraf Hossain
- Succeeded by: Kazi Sekendar Ali Dalim

Personal details
- Born: 27 November 1959 Khulna
- Died: 24 May 2011 (aged 51)
- Party: Jatiya Party (Ershad)

Hasina Banu Shirin (27 November 1959 – 24 May 2011) was a Jatiya Party (Ershad) politician and a member of parliament for Khulna-3.

== Career ==
Shirin was elected to parliament from Khulna-3 as a Jatiya Party candidate in 1986. She served as the whip of the parliament.
