= Faisul Islam Farouqui =

Faisul Islam Farouqui is a Bangladeshi academic and former vice-chancellor of the University of Rajshahi. He is a former member of the University Grants Commission.

== Career ==
Farouqui served as the vice-chancellor of the University of Rajshahi from 13 November 2001 to 5 June 2005. Farouqui was appointed vice-chancellor of the university by Bangladesh Nationalist Party government and replaced M. Sayeedur Rahman Khan, who was elected by the senate panel of the university. Since Farouqui no other vice-chancellors of the university have been elected.

In 2003, he oversaw the celebration of the 50th anniversary of University of Rajshahi. The residence of Farouqui was surrounded by employees of the university who protested the appointment of 88 employees on an ad hoc basis on 3 June 2005. Hen then cancelled their appointments following protests. Farouqui was replaced by Md. Altaf Hossain on 5 June 2005 as vice chancellor of the University of Rajshahi. He is the dean of the Faculty of Life and Earth Sciences.

On 13 August 2007, M Momtazul Islam, secretary of the Ministry of Education, asked Farouqui to resign from the University Grants Commission.
