= Sheikh Ahidul Islam =

Bangladeshi politician

Sheikh Sahidul Islam

Member of Parliament from Bagerhat-2
- In office 1988–1990
- Preceded by: Sheikh Abdur Rahman
- Succeeded by: Abu Saleh Mohammad Mustafizur Rahman

Personal details
- Born: Bagerhat District
- Party: Jatiya Party (Ershad)

Sheikh Sahidul Islam Politician of Bagerhat District of Bangladesh And elected a member of parliament from Bagerhat-2.

== Career ==
Sahidul was elected to parliament from Bagerhat-2 as a Jatiya Party In 1988 Bangladeshi general election.
