= Abu Saleh Mohammad Mustafizur Rahman =

Bangladeshi politician

- আ স ম মুস্তাফিজুর রহমান

Minister of Foreign Affairs
- In office 20 March 1991 – 30 March 1996
- Prime Minister: Khaleda Zia
- Preceded by: Anisul Islam Mahmud
- Succeeded by: Abdus Samad Azad

Minister of Commerce
- In office 1 December 1981 – 11 February 1982
- Prime Minister: Shah Azizur Rahman
- Preceded by: Chowdhury Tanbir Ahmed Siddiky
- Succeeded by: Mirza Nurul Huda

Minister of Home Affairs
- In office 6 July 1978 – 27 November 1981
- Prime Minister: Shah Azizur Rahman
- Preceded by: Ziaur Rahman
- Succeeded by: Mohammed Abdul Matin

3rd General Secretary of Bangladesh Nationalist Party
- In office 1985–1986
- Chaiperson: Khaleda Zia
- Preceded by: Nurul Islam Shishu
- Succeeded by: KM Obaidur Rahman

Member of Parliament
- In office 5 April 1991 – 24 November 1995
- Preceded by: Sheikh Sahidul Islam
- Succeeded by: Mir Shakawat Ali Daru
- Constituency: Bagerhat-2
- In office 18 February 1979 – 24 March 1982
- Preceded by: Sheikh Abdur Rahman
- Succeeded by: Mohammad Mohsin
- Constituency: Khulna-2

Personal details
- Born: 24 November 1934 Bagerhat, Bengal, British India
- Died: 30 November 1996 (aged 62) Khulna, Bangladesh
- Education: Dhaka College; Peshawar University

Military service
- Allegiance: Pakistan (before 1971); Bangladesh
- Branch/service: Pakistan Army; Bangladesh Army
- Years of service: 1955–1973
- Rank: Lieutenant Colonel
- Unit: Baloch Regiment; Regiment of Artillery
- Commands: CO of 7th Field Artillery Regiment; CO of 15th Field Artillery Regiment; Commander of 46th Independent Infantry Brigade

Abu Saleh Mohammad Mustafizur Rahman (24 November 1934 – 30 November 1996) was a lieutenant colonel of the Bangladesh Army, a member of parliament representing the Khulna-2 and Bagerhat-2 constituencies, and a government minister.

== Early life ==
Mustafizur Rahman was born on 24 November 1934 at Ranabijoypur in Bagerhat in the Bengal Presidency. His father, Khan Bahadur Bazlur Rahman, was a customs commissioner. He studied at St. Xavier's Collegiate School in Kolkata, West Bengal. He studied further at St. Gregory's School in Dhaka, East Bengal, and later joined Dhaka College. He graduated from Peshawar University.

== Career ==
Mustafizur Rahman joined the Pakistan army as a cadet in 1952 and received his commission on 13 March 1955. He started his career in the army in the Fifth Baloch Regiment. In 1956 he was selected to be an artillery officer. He worked in the Inter-Service Detective Branch. He completed his PSC degree from the Command and Staff College in Quetta, Pakistan, in 1962. After the independence of Bangladesh, he joined the Bangladesh army and was promoted to lieutenant colonel in 1973. He retired from service soon after.

Mustafizur Rahman started his political career after retirement from the army. President Ziaur Rahman placed him in charge of the home ministry in 1977. In 1978 he was made the minister of foreign affairs. In 1979 he was elected to parliament from Bagerhat-2 from the Bangladesh Nationalist Party. He served as the home minister until 27 November 1981. He was the commerce minister in the Abdus Sattar cabinet. He was elected as general secretary of the Bangladesh Nationalist Party in 1985.

In 1991, Mustafizur Rahman was elected to parliament and served subsequently as the foreign minister from March 1991 to March 1996. He served as the president of the Gulshan Rotary Club and the Cricket Control Board. He was a former chairman of the National Sports Control Board, Mohammedan Sporting Club, and Brothers Union Club. In 1993 he received the Gawanghwa Medal from the South Korean government.

Mustafizur Rahman died on 30 November 1996.
