= MA Khayer =

Bangladeshi politician

Member of Parliament from Khulna-1
- In office 1973–1975
- Succeeded by: Syed Mojahidur Rahman

Member of Parliament from Bagerhat-1
- In office 1986–1988
- Succeeded by: Sheikh Abdul Hye Bachchu

Personal details
- Party: Bangladesh Awami League

MA Khayer is a Bangladesh Awami League politician and a former member of parliament for Khulna-1 and Bagerhat-1.

== Career ==
Khayer was elected to parliament from Khulna-1 as a Bangladesh Awami League candidate in 1973. He was elected to parliament from Bagerhat-1 as a Bangladesh Awami League candidate in 1986.
