= Sheikh Abu Naser =

Bangladeshi businessmen (1928–1975)

- শেখ আবু নাসের

Personal details
- Born: 1 September 1928 Tungipara, Bengal, British India
- Died: 15 August 1975 (aged 46) Dhanmondi, Dhaka, Bangladesh
- Cause of death: Assassination
- Resting place: Banani graveyard, Dhaka
- Spouse: Razia Naser (m. 1957)
- Children: Sheikh Helal Uddin (Son); Sheikh Jalaluddin Rubel (Son); Sheikh Salahuddin Jewel (Son); Sheikh Sohel (Son); Sheikh Belal (Son); Sheikh Tahmina (Daughter)
- Relatives: Tungipara Sheikh family
- Occupation: Businessman

Military service
- Branch/service: Mukti Bahini
- Years of service: 1971
- Battles/wars: Bangladesh Liberation War

Sheikh Abu Naser (1928–1975) was a Bangladeshi businessmen. He was the only brother of the founding President of Bangladesh, Sheikh Mujibur Rahman and the uncle of the former Bangladesh Prime Minister Sheikh Hasina.

== Early life ==
Naser was Mujib's younger brother and he had 4 sisters.

== Career ==
Naser had a prosperous clearing and forwarding agency in the erstwhile East Pakistan. He earned almost Rs. 40,000 per month and employed mostly Hindus. His business was destroyed by the Pakistan Army, rendering him penniless, and Naser fled to neighboring India with nothing but the clothes on his back. He left his wife and children back in Bangladesh, whose whereabouts he was unaware of. The former communications minister and Muslim League leader Abdus Sabur Khan reportedly attempted to bribe Naser to convince his brother Mujib to accept the 4-point program of General Yahya Khan. Abdus Sabur Khan promised Naser that if he could convince his brother, then Naser would get many lucrative contracts in West Pakistan. Naser refused to accept the bribe and exclaimed that Mujib would rather die than sacrifice his principles. Naser was a member of Mukti Bahini during Bangladesh Liberation war and was formally recognized by the government of Bangladesh as a freedom fighter after the Independence of Bangladesh. In 1975, he was the largest contractor in Khulna.

== Personal life ==
Naser was married to Sheikh Razia Dolly (1941-2020). He had five sons and two daughters named Sheikh Jalaluddin Rubel, Sheikh Helal Uddin, Sheikh Jewel, and Sheikh Sohel, Sheikh Belal, Sheikh Tahmina and Sheikh Farhana Sheikh Sohel was a director of Bangladesh Cricket Board while Sheikh Helal and Sheikh Jewel were members of parliament. His grandson Sheikh Tonmoy (son of Sheikh Helal) was also a member of parliament. Naser's granddaughter Sheikh Shaira Rahman (daughter of Sheikh Helal) is married to his grand-nephew Andaleeve Rahman (grandson of his sister Sheikh Asia Begum). Naser was said to have closely resembled his older brother Sheikh Mujibur Rahman.

== Death and legacy ==
Naser was killed on 15 August 1975 by mutinous Bangladesh Army officers at the residence Mujib in Dhanmondi, during the course of the assassination of Mujib and many of his family members. He pleaded the assassins not to kill him as he was just a businessman and said to them, "I am not into politics, I do business for a living." Nevertheless, he was taken to a bathroom of the house where a soldier shot him. He was bleeding and begged for water when another soldier came in and shot him again, killing him. A number of Mujib's family members were killed by the assassins.

Sheikh Abu Naser Stadium and Sheikh Abu Naser Specialised Hospital, both in Khulna, were named after him, in 1996 and 2010, respectively, by the Bangladesh Awami League government. In 2003 the Bangladesh Nationalist Party renamed the stadium Birshreshtha Shaheed Flight Lieutenant Matiur Rahman stadium. The stadium's name reverted to Sheikh Abu Naser Stadium in 2009 after Bangladesh Awami League returned to power. After the fall of the Sheikh Hasina led Awami League government, Sheikh Abu Naser Specialised Hospital was renamed to Khulna Specialized Hospital.

=== Criticism ===
Naser was accused of being a ringleader of syndicates smuggling jute to India during the presidency of Mujib. It is said that his rise from near poverty in 1971 to being the largest contractor in Khulna was through favoritism and illegal means.
