= Shaikh Monzurul Haque Rahad =

Bangladeshi politician

- শেখ মনজুরুল হক রাহাদ

Member of the Bangladesh Parliament for Bagerhat-2
- Incumbent
- Assumed office 17 February 2026
- Preceded by: Sheikh Tanmoy

Personal details
- Born: 15 February 1984 (age 42) Bagerhat Sadar Upazila, Bagerhat District
- Party: Bangladesh Jamaat-e-Islami

Shaikh Monzurul Haque Rahad is a Bangladeshi politician of the Bangladesh Jamaat-e-Islami. He is currently serving as a member of parliament from Bagerhat-2 .

== Early life ==
Rahad was born on 15 February 1984 in Bagerhat Sadar Upazila under Bagerhat District.
