= Sheikh Abul Hossain =

Sheikh Abul Hossain may refer to:

- Sheikh Abul Hossain (Khulna politician)
- Sheikh Abul Hossain (Satkhira politician)
