= Panchanan Biswas =

Bangladeshi politician

- পঞ্চানন বিশ্বাস

Member of the Bangladesh Parliament for Khulna-1
- Incumbent
- Assumed office January 2014
- Preceded by: Nani Gopal Mandol
- In office September 1996 – October 2006
- Preceded by: Prafulla Kumar Mandal

Personal details
- Born: 24 October 1943 (age 82)
- Party: Bangladesh Awami League

Panchanan Biswas is a Bangladesh Awami League politician and the former Jatiya Sangsad member representing the Khulna-1 constituency from 2014 to 2024. He is one of the few Hindu Members of parliament in Bangladesh.

== Career ==
Biswas was elected to parliament in 1996 by elections from Khulna-1 as candidate of Bangladesh Awami League candidate. The seat was won in the 1996 general election by Prime Minister Sheikh Hasina. In parliament he questioned Prime Minister Sheikh Hasina in 1998, if the Chittagong Hill Tracts peace treaty had curbed the rights of Bengali People living there. He was reelected in 2001 from Khulna-1.

In 2008, Biswas lost the Bangladesh Awami League nomination from Khulna-1 to Nani Gopal Mandol. He tried to participate in the Khulna-1 election in 2008 as an independent candidate but withdrew his candidacy on 12 December 2008 before the election. He was elected to Parliament in 2014 on a Bangladesh Awami League nomination from Khulna-1. He is a member of the Parliamentary Standing Committee on Public Accounts.
