= Arshaduzzaman =

Bangladeshi politician

- আরশাদুজ্জামান

Member of Parliament from Bagerhat-4
- In office 15 February 1996 – 12 June 1996
- Preceded by: Abdus Sattar Akon
- Succeeded by: Mozammel Hossain

Personal details
- Party: Bangladesh Nationalist Party

Arshaduzzaman Bangladesh Nationalist Party politician. He was elected a member of parliament from Bagerhat-4 in February 1996.

== Career ==
Arshaduzzaman was elected to parliament from Bagerhat-3 as a Bangladesh Nationalist Party candidate in the 15 February 1996 Bangladeshi general election.
