= Mia Musa Hossain =

Bangladeshi politician

Member of Bangladesh Parliament
- In office 1988–1991
- Preceded by: Mohammad Mohsin
- Succeeded by: Sheikh Razzak Ali

Personal details
- Party: Jatiya Party (Ershad)

Mia Musa Hossain is a Jatiya Party (Ershad) politician in Bangladesh and a former member of parliament for Khulna-2.

== Career ==
Hossain was elected to parliament from Khulna-2 as a Jatiya Party candidate in 1988.
