= Md. Moshiur Rahman Khan =

Bangladeshi politician

- মোঃ মশিউর রহমান খান

Member of the Bangladesh Parliament for Bagerhat-1
- Incumbent
- Assumed office 17 February 2026
- Preceded by: Sheikh Helal Uddin

Personal details
- Born: June 2, 1968 (age 58) Chitalmari Upazila, Bagerhat District
- Party: Bangladesh Jamaat-e-Islami

Md. Moshiur Rahman Khan is a Bangladeshi politician of the Bangladesh Jamaat-e-Islami. He is currently serving as a member of parliament from Bagerhat-1.

== Early life ==
Khan was born on 2 June 1968 in Chitalmari Upazila in Bagerhat District.
