= Md. Abdul Aleem =

Bangladeshi politician

- মোঃ আব্দুল আলীম

Member of the Bangladesh Parliament for Bagerhat-4
- Incumbent
- Assumed office 17 February 2026
- Preceded by: HM Badiuzzaman Sohag

Personal details
- Born: Morrelganj Upazila, Bagerhat District
- Party: Bangladesh Jamaat-e-Islami

Md. Abdul Aleem is a Bangladeshi politician of the Bangladesh Jamaat-e-Islami. He is currently serving as a member of parliament from Bagerhat-4.

== Early life ==
Aleem was born in Morrelganj Upazila in Bagerhat District.
