= Bagerhat-4 =

Constituency of Bangladesh's Jatiya Sangsad

- Constituency for the Jatiya Sangsad
- District: Bagerhat District
- Division: Khulna Division
- Electorate: 380,679 (2026)

Current constituency
- Created: 1984
- Party: Bangladesh Jamaat-e-Islami
- Member: Md. Abdul Aleem
- ← 97 Bagerhat-3 99 Khulna-1 →

Bagerhat-4 is a constituency represented in the Jatiya Sangsad (National Parliament) of Bangladesh since 2026 by Md. Abdul Aleem of the Bangladesh Jamaat-e-Islami.

== Boundaries ==
The constituency encompasses Morrelganj and Sarankhola upazilas.

== History ==
The constituency was created in 1984 from a Khulna constituency when the former Khulna District was split into three districts: Bagerhat, Khulna, and Satkhira.

In 2025, the Election Commission announced that it would reduce the number of constituencies in Bagerhat District from four to three. They said they were evening out voters per constituency to ensure balanced representation. Their redistricting would have moved Fakirhat Upazila from Bagerhat-1 to Bagerhat-2, Bagerhat Sadar Upazila from Bagerhat-2 to Bagerhat-1, Kachua Upazila from Bagerhat-2 to Bagerhat-3, Rampal and Mongla upazilas from Bagerhat-3 to Bagerhat-2, and Morrelganj and Sarankhola upazilas from Bagerhat-4 to Bagerhat-3. Locals objected to the changes.

The High Court found that eliminating Bagerhat-4 solely because of low population was unsound and not supported by demographic data. They invalidated the changes, and their decision was upheld on appeal. So the 2026 general election went ahead with the long-standing constituency boundaries.

== Members of Parliament ==
Election	Member	Party
1986	Altaf Hossain	Jatiya Party
1988	Mia Abbas Uddin	Independent
1991	Abdus Sattar Akon	Bangladesh Jamaat-e-Islami
Feb 1996	Arshaduzzaman	Bangladesh Nationalist Party
Jun 1996	Mozammel Hossain	Awami League
2001	Abdus Sattar Akon	Bangladesh Jamaat-e-Islami
2008	Mozammel Hossain	Awami League
Mar 2020 by-election	Amirul Alam Milon	Awami League
2024	HM Badiuzzaman Sohag	Awami League
2026	Md. Abdul Aleem	Bangladesh Jamaat-e-Islami

== Elections ==
=== Elections in the 1990s ===
General Election 1991: Bagerhat-4
Party	Candidate	Votes	%	±%
Jamaat	Abdus Sattar Akon	55,124	42.9	
AL	Sheikh Abul Aziz	50,467	39.3	
BNP	Shamsul Alam Tang	18,967	14.8	
JP(E)	Habibur Rahman	2,040	1.6	
Independent	A. Sottar Mollah	815	0.6	
Zaker Party	Mozammel Haq	366	0.3	
Independent	Mia Abbas Uddin	207	0.2	
IOJ	ATM Hemayet Uddin	174	0.1	
JSD (S)	Amita Basu	153	0.1	
Bangladesh Krishak Sramik Awami League (1983–1991)	Amirul Alam	117	0.1	
Independent	Md. Muhsin Mollah	85	0.1	
Majority		4,657	3.6	
Turnout		128,515	50.2	
Jamaat gain from Independent				

General Election June 1996: Bagerhat-4
Party	Candidate	Votes	%	±%
AL	Mozammel Hossain	55,227	41.1	+1.8
BNP	Altaf Hossain	29,429	21.9	+7.1
Jamaat	Abdus Sattar Akon	21,557	16.1	−26.8
JP(E)	S. M. Kabir Ahmed	13,026	9.7	+8.1
Independent	Sheikh Abdul Aziz	8,801	6.6	−32.7
IOJ	ATM Hemayet Uddin	5,605	4.2	+4.1
Zaker Party	H. A. Mannan Lihaji	214	0.2	−0.1
Independent	Md. Sarwar Hossain	173	0.1	N/A
Gano Forum	Aminul Islam	110	0.1	N/A
Independent	Md. Samsul Alam Taluldar	78	0.1	N/A
FP	Moniruzzaman Khan	63	0.0	N/A
Majority		25,798	19.2	+15.6
Turnout		134,283	70.3	+20.1
AL gain from Jamaat				

=== Elections in the 2000s ===
General Election 2001: Bagerhat-4
Party	Candidate	Votes	%	±%
Jamaat	Abdus Sattar Akon	83,950	48.1	+32.0
AL	Mozammel Hossain	81,979	47.0	+5.9
Jatiya Party (M)	H. A. Mannan Lihaji	5,189	3.0	N/A
IJOF	ATM Hemayet Uddin	3,341	1.9	N/A
Bangladesh Progressive Party	Md. Aminul Islam	99	0.1	N/A
Majority		1,971	1.1	−18.1
Turnout		174,558	70.5	+0.2
Jamaat gain from AL				

General Election 2008: Bagerhat-4
Party	Candidate	Votes	%	±%
AL	Mozammel Hossain	116,454	58.2	+11.2
Jamaat	Md. Shahidul Islam	78,327	39.1	−9.0
IAB	A. Mazid Hawlader	5,076	2.5	N/A
Majority		38,127	19.0	+17.9
Turnout		200,223	88.5	+18.0
AL gain from Jamaat				

=== Elections in the 2010s ===
General Election 2014: Bagerhat-4
Party	Candidate	Votes	%	±%
AL	Mozammel Hossain	61,308	60.1	+1.9
Independent	Md. Abdur Rahim Khan	21,261	20.8	N/A
Independent	M. M. Monirul Haque	19,220	18.8	N/A
BNF	Md. Sakhawat Hossain	305	0.3	N/A
Majority		40,047	39.2	+20.2
Turnout		102,094	39.3	−49.2
AL hold				

=== Elections in the 2020s ===
General Election 2026: Bagerhat-4
Party	Candidate	Votes	%	±%
Jamaat	Md. Abdul Aleem	116,067	51.7	N/A
BNP	Somnath Dey	98,326	43.8	N/A
IAB	Md. Omar Faruk	8,501	3.8	N/A
JP(E)	Sajon Kumar Mistri	1,147	0.5	N/A
JSD	Md. A. Latif Khan	315	0.1	N/A
Independent	Kazi Khairuzzaman	229	0.1	N/A
Majority		17,741	7.9	N/A
Turnout		224,585	59.0	N/A
Jamaat gain from AL				
