= Khulna-1 =

Constituency of Bangladesh's Jatiya Sangsad

Coordinates: 22.74°N 89.52°E

- Constituency for the Jatiya Sangsad
- District: Khulna District
- Division: Khulna Division
- Electorate: 307,103 (2026)

Current constituency
- Created: 1973
- Party: Bangladesh Nationalist Party
- Member: Amir Ejaz Khan
- ← 98 Bagerhat-4 100 Khulna-2 →

Khulna-1 is a constituency represented in the Jatiya Sangsad (National Parliament) of Bangladesh since 2026 by Amir Ejaz Khan of the Bangladesh Nationalist Party.

== Boundaries ==
The constituency encompasses Batiaghata and Dacope upazilas.

== History ==
The constituency was created for the first general elections in newly independent Bangladesh, held in 1973.

Ahead of the 2008 general election, the Election Commission redrew constituency boundaries to reflect population changes revealed by the 2001 Bangladesh census. The 2008 redistricting altered the boundaries of the constituency.

Ahead of the 2014 general election, the Election Commission reduced the boundaries of the constituency. Previously it had also included one union parishad of Paikgachha Upazila: Deluti.

== Members of Parliament ==
Election	Member	Party
1973	M. A. Khair	Awami League
1979	Syed Mojahidur Rahman	Bangladesh Nationalist Party
Major Boundary Changes
1986	Sheikh Harunur Rashid	Awami League
1988	Sheikh Abul Hossain	Jatiya Party (Ershad)
1991	Sheikh Harunur Rashid	Awami League
Feb 1996	Prafulla Kumar Mandal	Bangladesh Nationalist Party
Sep 1996 by-election	Panchanan Biswas	Awami League
2008	Nani Gopal Mandal	Awami League
2014	Panchanan Biswas	Awami League
2024	Nani Gopal Mandal	Awami League
2026	Amir Ejaz Khan	Bangladesh Nationalist Party

== Elections ==
=== Elections in the 2020s ===
General election 2026: Khulna-1
Party	Candidate	Votes	%	±%
BNP	Amir Ejaz Khan	121,352	63.27	+28.27
Jamaat	Krishna Nandi	70,346	36.73	+34.73
Majority		51,006	26.6	−4.8
Turnout		208,587	67.9	+23.1
Registered electors		307,103		
BNP gain from AL				

=== Elections in the 2010s ===
General Election 2014: Khulna-1
Party	Candidate	Votes	%	±%
AL	Panchanan Biswas	66,904	64.9	+3.1
Independent	Nani Gopal Mandal	34,527	33.5	N/A
JP(E)	Sunil Shubha Ray	1,682	1.6	N/A
Majority		32,377	31.4	+4.6
Turnout		103,113	44.8	−44.9
AL hold				

=== Elections in the 2000s ===
General Election 2008: Khulna-1
Party	Candidate	Votes	%	±%
AL	Nani Gopal Mandal	120,801	61.8	+9.9
BNP	Amir Ejaz Khan	68,420	35.0	+3.6
IAB	Md. Abu Shaid	5,746	2.9	N/A
National People's Party	Sheikh Md. Jakir Hossen	412	0.2	N/A
Majority		52,381	26.8	+6.3
Turnout		195,379	89.7	+5.5
AL hold				

General Election 2001: Khulna-1
Party	Candidate	Votes	%	±%
AL	Panchanan Biswas	78,552	51.9	
BNP	Amir Ezaz Khan	47,523	31.4	
CPB	Acinta Kumar Biswas	18,512	12.2	
IJOF	Sheikh Abul Hossain	6,560	4.3	
Independent	Sheikh Asaduzzaman Jalal	111	0.1	
Majority		31,029	20.5	
Turnout		151,258	84.2	
AL hold				

=== Elections in the 1990s ===
Sheikh Hasina stood for three seats in the June 1996 general election: Bagerhat-1, Khulna-1, and Gopalganj-3. After winning all three, she chose to represent Gopalganj-3 and quit the other two, triggering by-elections in them. Panchanan Biswas was elected in a September 1996 by-election.

General Election June 1996: Khulna-1
Party	Candidate	Votes	%	±%
AL	Sheikh Hasina	62,247	53.5	+5.8
CPB	Acinta Kumar Biswas	19,398	16.7	−6.3
BNP	Profullah Kumar Mandal	11,910	10.2	−4.9
Independent	Md. Ismail Hossain	11,250	9.7	N/A
JP(E)	Binoy Krisna Roy	8,048	6.9	−0.7
Jamaat	Sheikh Md. Abu Yusuf	2,308	2.0	N/A
IOJ	Ataur Rahman Atiq	775	0.7	N/A
Jatiya Samajtantrik Dal-JSD	S. N. Masum	260	0.2	N/A
Zaker Party	K. M. Idris Ali	165	0.1	−0.1
Independent	Md. Akram Sheikh	65	0.1	N/A
Majority		42,849	36.8	+12.2
Turnout		116,426	80.4	+14.1
AL hold				

General Election 1991: Khulna-1
Party	Candidate	Votes	%	±%
AL	Sheikh Harunur Rashid	44,812	47.7	
CPB	Acinta Kumar Biswas	21,688	23.0	
BNP	M. Nurul Islam	14,203	15.1	
JP(E)	Binoy Krisna Roy	7,161	7.6	
Independent	Akram Hashem Sheikh	4,866	5.2	
Independent	A. U. Ahmmad	720	0.8	
Zaker Party	Md. Lutfor Rahman	195	0.2	
Independent	Somor Kanti Haldar	156	0.2	
JSD (S)	Nuruzzaman Sheikh	128	0.1	
Bangladesh Muslim League (Kader)	Molla Lutfor Rahman	95	0.1	
Majority		23,144	24.6	
Turnout		94,004	66.3	
AL gain from JP(E)				
