= Prafulla Kumar Mandal =

Bangladesh Nationalist Party politician

- প্রফুল্ল কুমার মন্ডল

Member of Parliament from Khulna-1
- In office 15 February 1996 – 12 June 1996
- Preceded by: Sheikh Harunur Rashid
- Succeeded by: Sheikh Hasina

Personal details
- Party: Bangladesh Nationalist Party

Prafulla Kumar Mandal is a Bangladesh Nationalist Party politician. He was elected a member of parliament from Khulna-1 in February 1996.

== Career ==
Prafulla Kumar Mandal was elected to parliament from Khulna-1 as a Bangladesh Nationalist Party candidate in 15 February 1996 Bangladeshi general election.

He was defeated from Khulna-1 constituency on 12 June 1996 on the nomination of Bangladesh Nationalist Party.
