= Lakhpur Union =

Lakhpur Union লখপুর ইউনিয়ন
- Union
- Lakhpur Union
- Country: Bangladesh
- Division: Khulna
- District: Bagerhat
- Upazila: Fakirhat

Area
  - Total: 47.99 km^{2} (18.53 sq mi)

Population (2011)
  - Total: 16,747
  - Density: 349.0/km^{2} (903.8/sq mi)
- Time zone: UTC+6 (BST)
- Website: lakhpurup.bagerhat.gov.bd

Lakhpur Union (Bengali: লখপুর ইউনিয়ন) is a Union Parishad under Fakirhat Upazila of Bagerhat District in the division of Khulna, Bangladesh. It has an area of 47.99 km2 (18.53 sq mi) and a population of 16,747.

== Villages ==
1. Lakhpur Post code, 9240
2. Boro Khajura
3. Choto Khajura
4. Kahardanga
5. Mightkomra
