= Mohammad Mizanur Rahman =

Bangladeshi politician

- মুহাম্মদ মিজানুর রহমান

Member of the Bangladesh Parliament for Khulna-2
- In office 29 January 2014 – 29 January 2019
- Preceded by: Nazrul Islam Manju
- Succeeded by: Sheikh Salahuddin Jewel

Personal details
- Born: 1 June 1957 (age 68)
- Party: Bangladesh Awami League

Mohammad Mizanur Rahman (born 1 June 1957) is a Bangladesh Awami League politician and a former Jatiya Sangsad member for the Khulna-2 constituency.

== Early life ==
Rahman attended St. Joseph's High School, Khulna. He completed his bachelor's in commerce.

== Career ==
Rahman was elected to parliament from Khulna-2 on 5 January 2014 as a Bangladesh Awami League candidate.

In April 2018, the Anti-Corruption Commission announced an investigation into his wealth. In August 2019, the commission filed a case against him for allegedly amassing wealth worth about Tk 1.5 crore beyond the known source of income.
