= Sk. Zahangir Hossain Helal =

Bangladeshi politician

- এস.কে. জাহাঙ্গীর হোসেন হেলাল

Member of Parliament
- Incumbent
- Assumed office 12 February 2026
- Preceded by: Sheikh Salahuddin Jewel
- Constituency: Khulna-2

Personal details
- Born: 21 November 1974 (age 51) Khulna, Bangladesh
- Party: Bangladesh Jamaat-e-Islami
- Occupation: Politician

Sk. Zahangir Hossain Helal is a Bangladeshi politician. He is an elected member of parliament from the Khulna-2 constituency.
