= Mohammad Mohsin (Khulna politician) =

Bangladeshi politician

Member of the Bangladesh Parliament for Khulna-2
- In office 10 July 1986 – 6 December 1987
- Preceded by: ASM Mustafizur Rahman
- Succeeded by: Mia Musa Hossain

Personal details
- Party: Jatiya Party (Ershad)

Mohammad Mohsin is a Jatiya Party (Ershad) politician and a former member of parliament for Khulna-2.

== Career ==
Mohsin was elected to parliament from Khulna-2 as a Jatiya Party candidate in 1986.
