= ATM Hemayet Uddin =

Maulana A. T. M. Hemaet Uddin
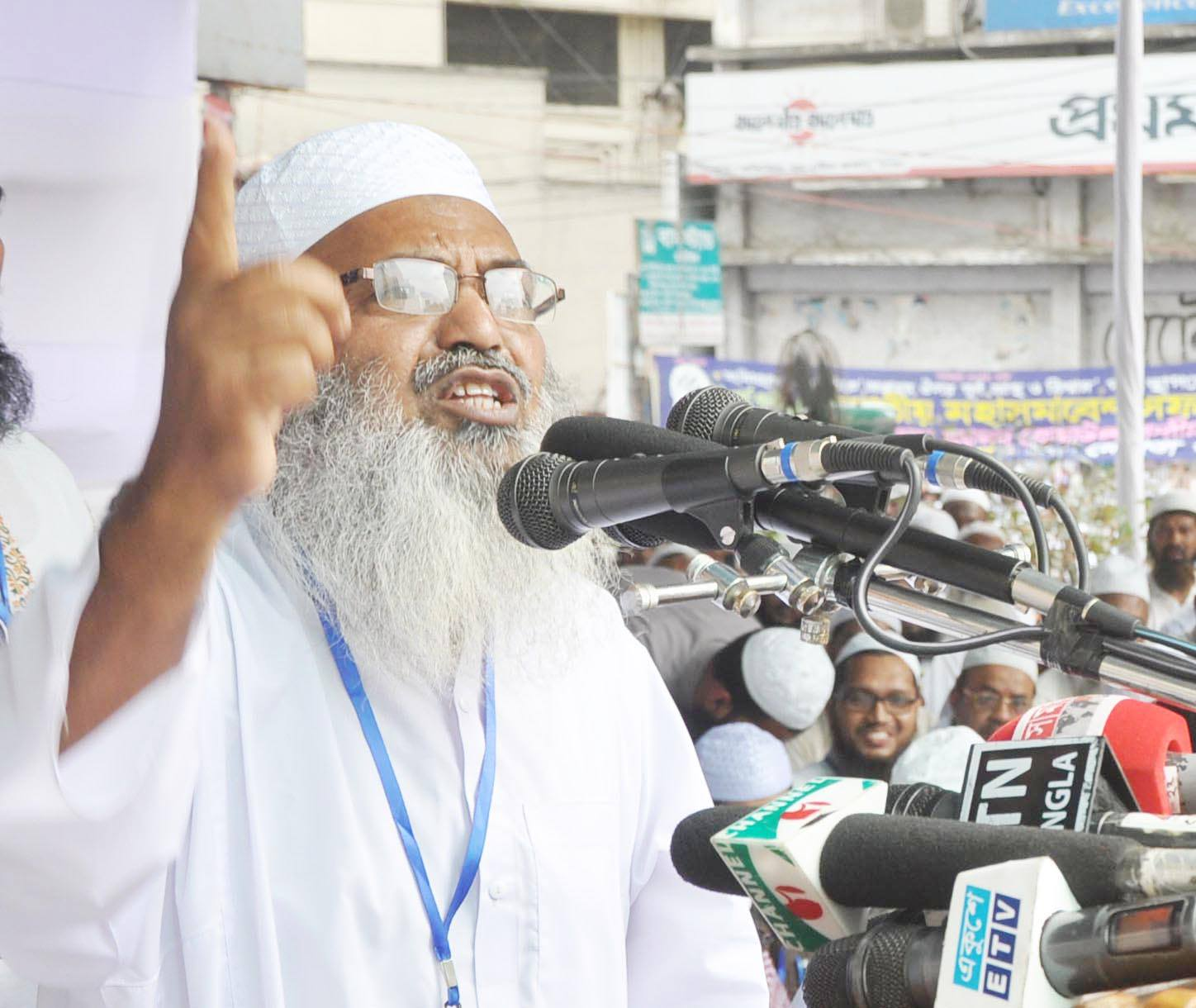

Personal details
- Born: 1955 Morrelganj, Bagerhat
- Died: 11 October 2019 (aged 63–64)
- Party: Islami Andolan Bangladesh
- Children: 1 son, 1 daughter
- Education: Government Madrasah-e-Alia, Dhaka; University of Dhaka

Abu T. Mohammad Hemayet Uddin (1955 — 2019) was a Bangladeshi Islamic scholar and politician. He served as the joint secretary general of Islami Andolan Bangladesh and the president of its Dhaka district branch. He led the movement to gain autonomy for the Bangladesh Madrasah Education Board. In the 2002 undivided Dhaka City Corporation mayoral election, he secured the second position.

== Early life ==
Hemaet Uddin was born in 1955 in Morrelganj, Bagerhat, then part of the Khulna Division of East Bengal, Pakistan. He was the second child of the eleven sons and five daughters of Maulana Abdul Ali Khalifatabadi. He started his education at his father's institution. He completed the memorization of the Qur'an at Khulna Shiromoni Hafezia Madrasah. He later earned a Kamil degree from Government Madrasah-e-Alia, Dhaka and an MA in Islamic Studies from the University of Dhaka.

== Career ==
In his professional life, he was a professor at Abuzar Gifari College in Malibagh, Dhaka, and an associate professor at Rampura Ekramunnesa Degree College. He also served as the principal of his father's institution for some time. For 42 years, he was the Imam and Khatib of the West Rajabazar Jame Mosque in Farmgate. In 1987, he established the West Rajabazar Hefzkhana. He also founded numerous mosques and madrasahs, including Matuail Allah Kareem Madrasah.

== Political career ==
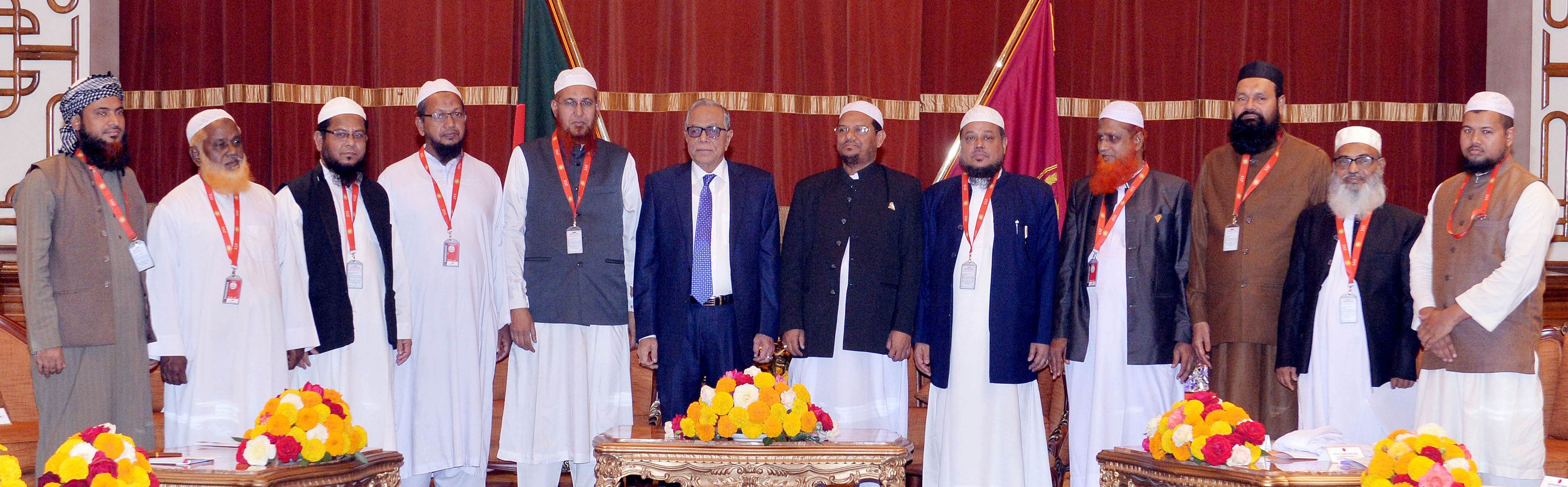
Hemaet Uddin with President Abdul Hamid (second from right)

He was involved in politics since his student days. From 1981 to 1983, he was the central president of the student organization Jamiat-e-Talabaye Arabia. In 1981, he led a siege of the Jatiya Sangsad (National Parliament) in a movement to demand 17 points for Alia Madrasah students, including the autonomy of the Bangladesh Madrasah Education Board. The movement was successful, and he was later honored by Baqibillah Khan, the first chairman of the autonomous Madrasah Education Board.

He began his political life with Muhammadullah Hafezzi, a pioneer of Islamic politics in Bangladesh. He played a significant role in Hafezzi's presidential campaign. After Hafezzi's death, he joined the Islami Shasantantra Andolan, now known as Islami Andolan Bangladesh, under the leadership of Syed Fazlul Karim. He held various positions within Islami Andolan Bangladesh, ultimately serving as the president of its undivided Dhaka metropolitan branch and later as a central joint secretary general. In the 1991 and 1996 national elections, he contested from the Bagerhat-4 constituency on behalf of Islami Shasantantra Andolan, a partner of the Islami Oikya Jote. In 2001, he ran for election from the Bagerhat-3 and Bagerhat-4 constituencies with the Islami Jatiyatabadi Oikyafront. In the 2002 undivided Dhaka City Corporation mayoral election, he was the mayoral candidate for Islami Shasantantra Andolan and secured the second position.

He was imprisoned for a long time for protesting the demolition of the Babri Masjid. He was also involved in various political and social movements, including the anti-Farakka and Tipaimukh Dam movements in India, the Babri Masjid protection movement, protests against the persecution of Muslims in Myanmar, Palestine, Kashmir, and Xinjiang, and the anti-fatwa movement.

== Death ==
He died on October 11, 2019, from lung cancer. His Salat al-Janazah was held after Asr prayer at the T&T ground near the National Parliament Building, led by Syed Faizul Karim. The following day, he was buried in his family graveyard in the village of Rajair in the Morrelganj Upazila of Bagerhat District.

== See also ==
- List of Deobandis
