= Monnujan Sufian =

Bangladeshi politician

- মন্নুজান সুফিয়ান
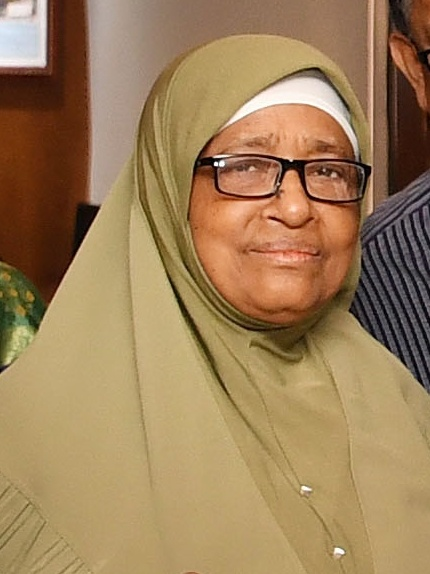
- Sufian in 2019

Minister of State for Labour and Employment
- In office 7 January 2019 – 11 January 2024
- Preceded by: Mujibul Haque
- Succeeded by: Nurul Haque Nur
- In office 8 January 2009 – 24 January 2014
- Preceded by: Amanullah Aman

Member of the Bangladesh Parliament for Women's Reserved Seat-11
- In office 28 February 2024 – 6 August 2024
- Preceded by: Mst. Tahmina Begum

Member of the Bangladesh Parliament for Khulna-3
- In office 25 January 2009 – 29 January 2024
- Preceded by: Ashraf Hossain
- Succeeded by: SM Kamal Hossain

Personal details
- Born: 1 January 1953 (age 73)
- Party: Bangladesh Awami League
- Spouse: Abu Sufian
- Education: B.A.
- Occupation: Businessperson, social worker, politician

Monnujan Sufian (born 1 January 1953) is a Bangladesh Awami League politician and a former Jatiya Sangsad member from Women's Reserved Seat-11 and from Khulna-3 constituency. She is a former State Minister of Labour and Employment.

== Background ==
Sufian completed her bachelor's from Khulna Girls' College in 1969. Her husband, Abu Sufyan Bir Protik, was a freedom fighter, politician and labor leader. She is the daughter of Late Alhaj Moslem Bawali and Late Johra Begum and the eldest among her siblings.

== Career ==
Sufian served as the president of Khulna Girls' College unit of Bangladesh Chhatra League in 1968.

Sufian was elected to parliament from Khulna-3 as an Awami League candidate in 2008. She was appointed State Minister of Labour and Employment in the Second Sheikh Hasina Cabinet.

Sufian was re-elected to parliament from Khulna-3 as an Awami League candidate in 2014. She received 45,950 votes while her nearest rival, Independent Md. Moniruzzaman Khokon, received 6,424.

Sufian was sued by three faculty members of Daulatpur Day-Night College, of which she is the President of the managing committee, on 15 October 2015 alleging that they were unfairly dismissed from their workplace.

Sufian was re-elected to parliament from Khulna-3 as an Awami League candidate in 2018. She received 134,806 votes while her nearest rival, Rokibul Islam Bokul of Bangladesh Nationalist Party, received 23,060 votes.

Munnujan didn't participate in the 2024 general election but she was nominated from the Women's Reserved Seat by Awami League.
