= M. Sayeedur Rahman Khan =

- এম. সাইদুর রহমান খান
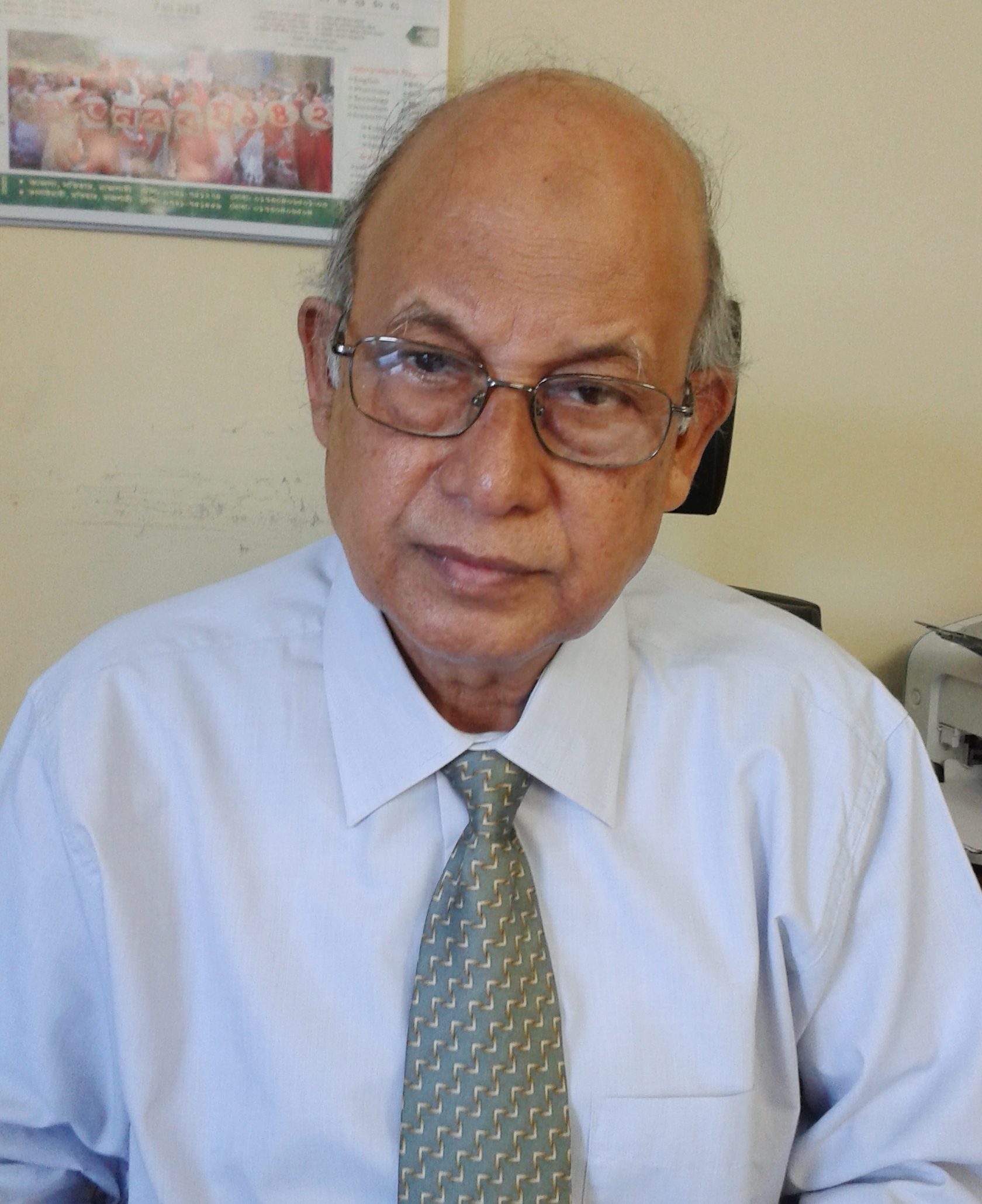
- Khan in 2015

High Commissioner of Bangladesh to the United Kingdom
- In office 2009–2012
- Preceded by: Shafi U Ahmed
- Succeeded by: Mohamed Mijarul Quayes

Vice Chancellor of the University of Rajshahi
- In office 4 August 1999 – 13 November 2001
- Preceded by: Abdul Khaleque
- Succeeded by: Faisul Islam Farouqui

Personal details
- Born: 6 October 1946 (age 80) Pabna, Bengal Province, British India
- Spouse: Quamrun Rahman Khan
- Education: University of Rajshahi
- Occupation: Academic, diplomat, physicist

M. Sayeedur Rahman Khan (born 6 October 1946) is a Bangladeshi academic and diplomat. He is the former High Commissioner of Bangladesh to the UK. and the vice-chancellor of University of Rajshahi

== Birth and family ==
Khan was born in the village of Boronaogaon in Pabna. on October 6, 1946. His father Chayen Uddin was a school teacher and mother Taiyabuna Nessa was a housewife. He was the youngest of four brothers, and had one sister. He lost his father at an early age in the sixth grade.

Quamrun Rahman Khan, his wife, is a retired school teacher. They have two daughters and a son.

== Education and research ==
Khan completed his matriculation from Thakurgaon High School in 1963, obtaining sixth position in the combined merit list. Later, he finished his higher secondary school certificate examination from Pabna Edward College in 1965. He completed his B.Sc. Hons. in physics in 1968 and M.Sc. in applied physics and electronics in 1969 from University of Rajshahi, securing first class first position in both the exams. He moved to the UK in 1972 to pursue his doctoral studies with Commonwealth Scholarship and completed his PhD in physics in 1977 from Royal Holloway, University of London. His primary field of research are in the area of thin solid films and solar energy.

== Career ==
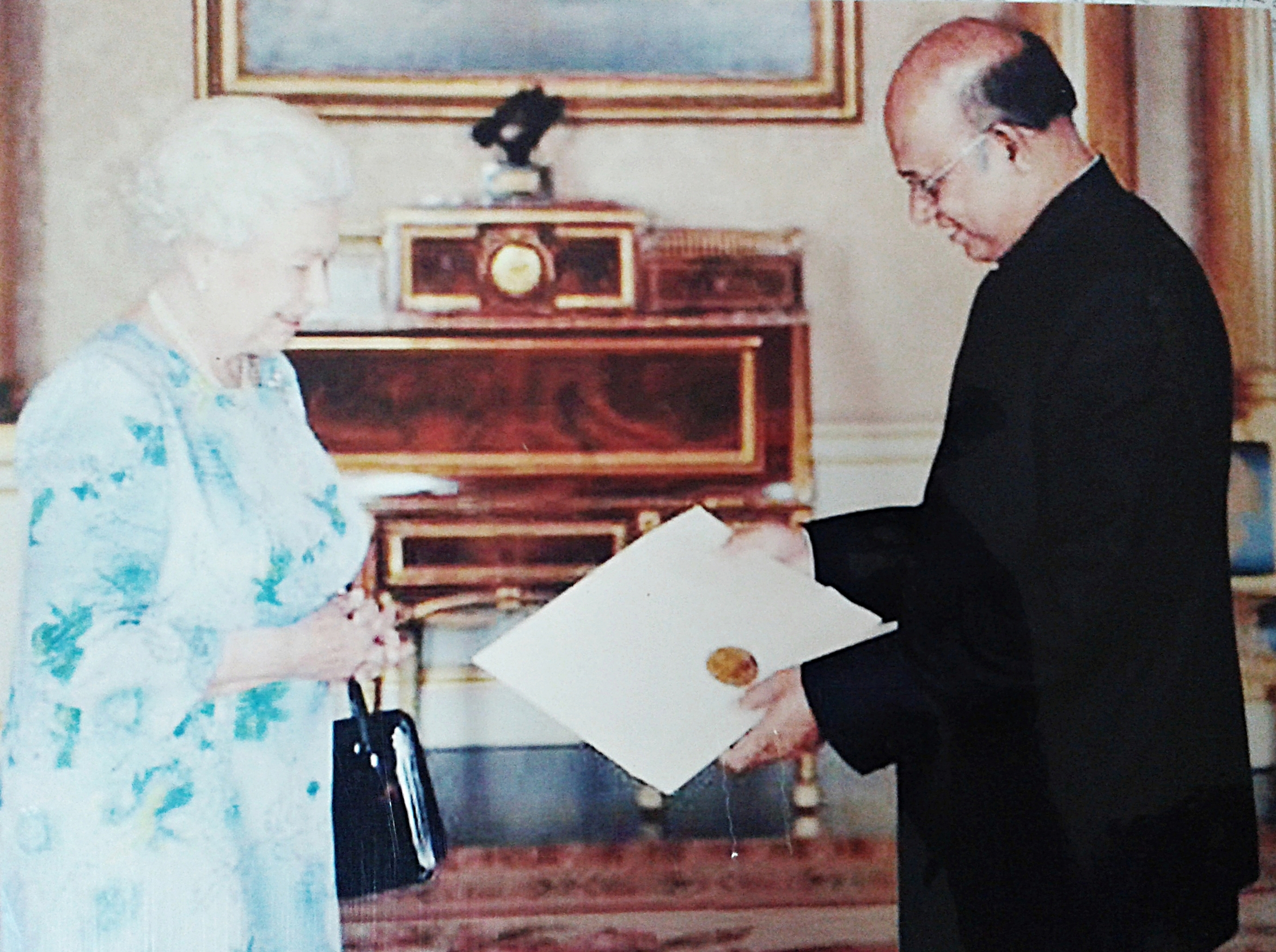
Queen Elizabeth II Meets Dr M. Sayeedur Rahman Khan

Khan joined the Department of Applied Physics in University of Rajshahi as a lecturer in 1970 and retired as a professor in 2012. He taught at University of Zambia from 1980 to 1982 and at Ahmadu Bello University in Nigeria from 1982 to 1984. He conducted his post-doctoral research at Uppsala University (1990) and Tsinghua University (1992). He also worked as a researcher at International Centre for Theoretical Physics and Brunel University London (with EEC fellowship).

Khan served as the 17th vice chancellor of University of Rajshahi during 1999–2001. Prior to this he also held position as the pro-vice chancellor, member of the senate, member of the syndicate and the chairman of the 'Department of Applied Physics and Electronics' at the same university.

As a member of the Bangladeshi delegation, Khan played an important role in the declaration of February 21 as the International Mother Language Day by UNESCO in 1999, in Paris.

Khan served as the High Commissioner of Bangladesh to UK and an ambassador to Ireland (Note: As Ireland left the Commonwealth on 18 April 1949 when the Republic of Ireland Act 1948 came into effect upon the declaration of the Republic of Ireland, it does not exchange High Commissioners with Commonwealth countries.) from 2009 to 2012.

Currently, Khan is working as an adviser at Varendra University.

== Publications ==
There are about 40 scientific papers published by him, mostly in foreign journals. He presented his research articles at more than 20 international conferences. He is also the author of two textbooks.
