= SM Kamal Hossain =

Bangladeshi politician

Member of the Bangladesh Parliament for Khulna-3
- In office 7 January 2024 – 6 August 2024
- Preceded by: Monnujan Sufian
- Succeeded by: Rakibul Islam

Personal details
- Born: 31 January 1962 (age 64)
- Party: Awami League

SM Kamal Hossain (born 31 January 1962) is a Awami League politician and a former Jatiya Sangsad member representing the Khulna-3 constituency in 2024.

== Career ==
Hossain was elected to parliament from Khulna-3 as an Awami League candidate on 7 January 2024.
