= Mia Abbas Uddin =

Bangladeshi politician

- মিয়া আব্বাস উদ্দিন

Member of Parliament from Bagerhat-4
- In office 1988–1990
- Preceded by: Altaf Hossain
- Succeeded by: Abdus Sattar Akon

Personal details
- Born: 1 January 1949 Bagerhat District
- Died: 28 December 2017 (aged 68) Ottawa, Canada
- Party: Bangladesh Nationalist Party
- Spouse: Setara Abbas
- Children: 1 son and 3 daughters

Mia Abbas Uddin (1 January 1949 – 28 December 2017) was a Bangladesh Nationalist Party politician and member of parliament from Bagerhat-4 in 1988.

== Early life ==
Mia Abbas Uddin was born on 1 January 1949 in Bagerhat District. His father Manik Mia and mother Raushan Ara. She married Setara Abbas. They have 1 son and 3 daughters.

== Career ==
Mia Abbas Uddin was elected to parliament from Bagerhat-4 as an independent candidate in 1988 Bangladeshi general election. In 1990, he joined the Bangladesh Nationalist Party (BNP). He was the president of Morelganj Upazila BNP. In 2014, he moved to Canada with his family.

== Death ==
Mia Abbas Uddin died on 28 December 2017 at a hospital in Ottawa, Canada, from a brain tumor and geriatric disease.
