= Amirul Alam Milon =

Bangladeshi politician

Member of Bangladesh Parliament
- In office 2020–2024
- Succeeded by: Mozammel Hossain

Personal details
- Born: 22 January 1953 (age 73) Bagerhat District
- Party: Bangladesh Awami League
- Education: University of Rajshahi

Amirul Alam Milon is a Bangladesh Awami League politician and a former member of parliament for Bagerhat-4.

== Early life ==
Milon was born on 22 January 1953 in Bagerhat District.

== Career ==
Milon was a lawyer. He was the president of the Rajshahi University Chhatra League from 1979 to 1981. He was the general secretary of the Morelganj Upazila Awami League in 1991. He was the president of the Morelganj Upazila Awami League in 2003. He was a member of the Central Executive Committee of the Bangladesh Awami League for the term of 2018 and 2019. In 2015, he served as the director of the Jiban Bima Corporation.

He was elected to parliament from Bagerhat-4 as a Bangladesh Awami League candidate in a 2020 by-election. The election was called after the incumbent, Mozammel Hossain, died in office.

Milon was arrested in May 2025 along with eight other Awami League leaders from Dhaka as part of a crackdown after the fall of the Sheikh Hasina-led Awami League government.
