= Bahirdia Mansa Union =

Bahirdia Mansa Union বাহিরদিয়া মানসা ইউনিয়ন
- Union
- Bahirdia Mansa Union
- Country: Bangladesh
- Division: Khulna
- District: Bagerhat
- Upazila: Fakirhat

Area
  - Total: 43.62 km^{2} (16.84 sq mi)

Population (2011)
  - Total: 14,368
  - Density: 329.4/km^{2} (853.1/sq mi)
- Time zone: UTC+6 (BST)
- Website: bahirdiamansaup.bagerhat.gov.bd

Bahirdia Mansa Union (Bengali: বাহিরদিয়া মানসা ইউনিয়ন) is a Union Parishad under Fakirhat Upazila of Bagerhat District in Khulna Division, Bangladesh. It has an area of 43.62 km2 (16.84 sq mi) and a population of 14,368.

== Villages ==
1. Mansa
2. Mansa / Attaka
3. Attaka
4. West Bahiridia
5. Mid Bahiridia
6. Small Bahiridia
7. Hochla
8. Satbariya
9. Lalchandrapur
