= HM Badiuzzaman Sohag =

Bangladeshi politician

- এইচ এম বদিউজ্জামান সোহাগ

Member of the Bangladesh Parliament for Bagerhat-4
- In office 10 January 2024 – 6 August 2024
- Preceded by: Amirul Alam Milon
- Succeeded by: Seat abolished

Personal details
- Born: 31 December 1982 (age 43)

HM Badiuzzaman Sohag (born 31 December 1982) is a Bangladesh Awami League politician and a former Jatiya Sangsad member representing the Bagerhat-4 constituency. He was a former president of Bangladesh Chhatra League.
