= Suvhadia Union =

Suvhadia Union শুভদিয়া ইউনিয়ন
- Union
- Suvhadia Union
- Country: Bangladesh
- Division: Khulna
- District: Bagerhat
- Upazila: Fakirhat

Area
  - Total: 72.93 km^{2} (28.16 sq mi)

Population (2011)
  - Total: 16,221
  - Density: 222.4/km^{2} (576.1/sq mi)
- Time zone: UTC+6 (BST)
- Website: suvhadiaup.bagerhat.gov.bd

Suvhadia Union (Bengali: শুভদিয়া ইউনিয়ন) is a Union Parishad under Fakirhat Upazila of Bagerhat District in Khulna Division, Bangladesh. It has an area of 72.93 km2 (28.16 sq mi) and a population of 16,221.
