= Naldha Mauvhog Union =

Naldha Mauvhog Union নলধা মৌভোগ ইউনিয়ন
- Union
- Naldha Mauvhog Union
- Country: Bangladesh
- Division: Khulna
- District: Bagerhat
- Upazila: Fakirhat

Area
  - Total: 60.37 km^{2} (23.31 sq mi)

Population (2011)
  - Total: 19,686
  - Density: 326.1/km^{2} (844.6/sq mi)
- Time zone: UTC+6 (BST)
- Website: naldhamauvhogup.bagerhat.gov.bd

Naldha Mauvhog Union (Bengali: নলধা মৌভোগ ইউনিয়ন) is a Union Parishad under Fakirhat Upazila of Bagerhat District in the division of Khulna, Bangladesh. It has an area of 60.37 km2 (23.31 sq mi) and a population of 19,686.
