= Manjurul Imam =

Bangladeshi lawyer and politician

- Died: 25 August 2003
- Awards: Ekushey Padak-2023

Manjurul Imam was a Bangladeshi lawyer and politician. In 2023, the government of Bangladesh nominated him for the Ekushey Padak posthumously.

== Career ==
Imam was a lawyer. He was the president of Khulna Metropolitan Awami League and a member of the Central Advisory Council. He was defeated as a candidate of Bangladesh Awami League from Khulna-2 seat in the fifth 1991, seventh 12 June 1996 and eighth national parliamentary elections in 2001.

== Awards ==
- Ekushey Padak- 2023

== Death ==
Manjurul Imam was killed on 25 August 2003, when he was going to the court by rickshaw from his house on Shamsur Rahman Road, Khulna, in a bomb attack.
