= Abdus Sattar Akon =

Bangladeshi politician

Mufti Abdus Sattar Akon
- আব্দুস সাত্তার আকন

Member of Parliament for Bagerhat-4
- In office 20 March 1991 – 30 March 1996
- Preceded by: Mia Abbas Uddin
- Succeeded by: Arshaduzzaman
- In office 13 July 2001 – 29 January 2008
- Preceded by: Mozammel Hossain
- Succeeded by: Mozammel Hossain

Personal details
- Born: 1929 Chalitabunia, Bagerhat, Bengal Presidency, British India
- Died: 6 February 2012 (aged 82–83) Dhaka, Bangladesh
- Resting place: Chalitabunia, Bagerhat District
- Party: Bangladesh Jamaat-e-Islami

Mufti Abdus Sattar Akon (1929 – 6 February 2012) was a teacher, politician and former leader of the Bangladesh Jamaat-e-Islami. He was a member of parliament for Bagerhat-4.

== Early life and background ==
Akon was born in 1929, to a Bengali Muslim Akon family in the village of Chalitabunia in Khaulia Union, Morrelganj, Bagerhat, Bengal Presidency. He first began his education at the Amtali Madrasa in Morrelganj and then at the Tumchar Madrasa in Lakshmipur. He then proceeded to study at the Sarsina Dar us-Sunnat Kamil Madrasa in Nesarabad, Firozpur.

== Career ==
Akon began his career as an Islamic studies teacher. In 1969, he became the leader of Jamaat-e-Islami Pakistan's Bakerganj District branch and was later promoted to become the leader of the party's Khulna Division branch in 1970. He had also served as the leader for the party's Bagerhat District branch and was a member of Bangladesh Jamaat-e-Islami's central Shura.

During the 1991 Bangladeshi general elections, Akon represented the party as a candidate for the Bagerhat-4 constituency and was successful. He was elected to parliament for a second-term in the 2001 Bangladeshi general election.

== Death and legacy ==
On 6 February 2012, Akon died as a result of illness at Ibn Sina hospital in Dhaka, Bangladesh. Two days later, his funeral occurred and he was buried at his family graveyard. He left behind three sons and seven daughters.
