= Fakirhat Union =

Fakirhat Union ফকিরহাট ইউনিয়ন
- Union
- Fakirhat Union
- Country: Bangladesh
- Division: Khulna
- District: Bagerhat
- Upazila: Fakirhat

Area
  - Total: 65.81 km^{2} (25.41 sq mi)

Population (2011)
  - Total: 31,725
  - Density: 482.1/km^{2} (1,249/sq mi)
- Time zone: UTC+6 (BST)
- Website: fakirhatup.bagerhat.gov.bd

Fakirhat Union (Bengali: ফকিরহাট ইউনিয়ন) is a Union Parishad under Fakirhat Upazila of Bagerhat District in the division of Khulna, Bangladesh. It has an area of 65.81 km2 (25.41 sq mi) and a population of 31,725 (2011).

== Villages ==
1. Attaki
2. Barasia
3. Kathaltala
4. Pagalashamanagar
5. Uttarapara
6. Deyapara
7. Shatshoiya
8. Brahmanrakdia
9. Jaria
10. Singati
11. Pikepara
12. Horaldanga
