= Rakibul Islam (politician) =

Bangladeshi politician

- রাকিবুল ইসলাম

Member of Parliament
- Incumbent
- Assumed office 13 February 2026
- Preceded by: SM Kamal Hossain
- Constituency: Khulna-3

Personal details
- Born: September 1, 1967 (age 59) Khulna, East Pakistan now Bangladesh
- Party: Bangladesh Nationalist Party
- Occupation: Politician

Rakibul Islam Bakul is a Bangladesh Nationalist party politician and elected member of Parliament from Khulna-3.

== Personal life ==
Bakul's wife is Shamima Parveen, a police officer who was appointed Superintendent of Police of Dhaka District in April 2026.
