= Betaga Union =

Betaga Union বেতাগা ইউনিয়ন
- Union
- Betaga Union
- Country: Bangladesh
- Division: Khulna
- District: Bagerhat
- Upazila: Fakirhat

Area
  - Total: 59.57 km^{2} (23.00 sq mi)

Population (2011)
  - Total: 15,305
  - Density: 256.9/km^{2} (665.4/sq mi)
- Time zone: UTC+6 (BST)
- Website: betagaup.bagerhat.gov.bd

Betaga Union (Bengali: বেতাগা ইউনিয়ন) is a Union Parishad under Fakirhat Upazila of Bagerhat District in the division of Khulna, Bangladesh. It has an area of 59.57 km2 (23.00 sq mi) and a population of 15,305.

== Villages ==
1. Maskata-1
2. Maskata-2
3. Dhanpota
4. Chakuli
5. Chakuli Adarshagram
6. Betaga-1
7. Betaga-2
8. Betaga-3
9. Nicklepur
10. Chaderdhon
11. Talbari
12. Shattala
13. Kumarkhali
14. Bighai
15. Shattala Adarshagram
16. Kumarkhali Gussogram
