= Khulna-3 =

Constituency of Bangladesh's Jatiya Sangsad

Coordinates: 22.85°N 89.54°E

- Constituency for the Jatiya Sangsad
- District: Khulna District
- Division: Khulna Division
- Electorate: 254,409 (2026)

Current constituency
- Created: 1973
- Party: Bangladesh Nationalist Party
- Member: Rakibul Islam
- ← 100 Khulna-2 102 Khulna-4 →

Khulna-3 is a constituency represented in the Jatiya Sangsad (National Parliament) of Bangladesh since 2026 by Rakibul Islam of the Bangladesh Nationalist Party.

== Boundaries ==
The constituency encompasses Khulna City Corporation wards 1 through 15, and two union parishads of Dighalia Upazila: Aronghata and Jogipole.

== History ==
The constituency was created for the first general elections in newly independent Bangladesh, held in 1973.

Ahead of the 2008 general election, the Election Commission redrew constituency boundaries to reflect population changes revealed by the 2001 Bangladesh census. The 2008 redistricting altered the boundaries of the constituency.

Ahead of the 2018 general election, the Election Commission expanded the boundaries of the constituency by adding one union parishad of Dighalia Upazila: Aronghata.

== Members of Parliament ==
Election	Member	Party
1973	Mir Sakhawat Ali	Awami League
1979	Aftab Uddin Hawlader	Bangladesh Nationalist Party
Major Boundary Changes
1986	Hasina Banu Shirin	Jatiya Party (Ershad)
1988	Abdul Gaffar Biswas	Independent
1991	Ashraf Hossain	Bangladesh Nationalist Party
1996	Kazi Sekandar Ali	Awami League
2001	Ashraf Hossain	Bangladesh Nationalist Party
2008	Monnujan Sufian	Awami League
2024	SM Kamal Hossain	Awami League
2026	Rakibul Islam	Bangladesh Nationalist Party

== Elections ==
=== Elections in the 2020s ===
General Election 2026: Khulna-3
Party	Candidate	Votes	%	±%
BNP	Rakibul Islam	74,845	53.28	+12.08
Jamaat	Md. Mahfuzur Rahman	66,010	46.72	−12.08
Majority		8,835	6.56	−68.14
Turnout		148,147	58.2	−20.1
Registered electors		254,409		
BNP gain from AL				

=== Elections in the 2010s ===
General Election 2014: Khulna-3
Party	Candidate	Votes	%	±%
AL	Monnujan Sufian	45,950	86.9	+34.7
Independent	Moniruzzaman Khan Khokon	6,424	12.1	N/A
Independent	Shahida Begum	512	1.0	N/A
Majority		39,526	74.7	+63.2
Turnout		52,886	29.6	−48.7
AL hold				

=== Elections in the 2000s ===
General Election 2008: Khulna-3
Party	Candidate	Votes	%	±%
AL	Monnujan Sufian	74,678	52.2	+11.9
BNP	Kazi Md. Shah Shakender Ali	58,177	40.6	−11.6
IAB	Gaji Nur Ahmad	7,435	5.2	N/A
JP(E)	Abdul Gaffar Biswas	2,648	1.8	N/A
BKA	S. M. Zahangir Mia	135	0.1	N/A
BML	Sheikh Jahedul Islam	107	0.1	N/A
Majority		16,501	11.5	−0.4
Turnout		143,180	78.3	+2.6
AL gain from BNP				

General Election 2001: Khulna-3
Party	Candidate	Votes	%	±%
BNP	Ashraf Hossain	72,285	52.2	+20.3
AL	Kazi Sekender Ali	55,797	40.3	+7.1
IJOF	Md. Mokhter Husain	10,305	7.4	N/A
Jatiya Party (M)	Sharif Shafiqul Hamid Chandan	99	0.1	N/A
Majority		16,488	11.9	+10.6
Turnout		138,486	75.7	−2.3
BNP gain from AL				

=== Elections in the 1990s ===
General Election June 1996: Khulna-3
Party	Candidate	Votes	%	±%
AL	Kazi Sekandar Ali	39,332	33.2	+0.5
BNP	Ashraf Hossain	37,780	31.9	−8.4
JP(E)	S. M. A. Rob	28,693	24.2	+9.4
Jamaat	Mia Golam Parwar	7,898	6.7	−2.7
IOJ	Moktar Hossain	3,448	2.9	N/A
Independent	Md. Delwar Hossain	440	0.4	N/A
Independent	Munshi Shamim-Ur-Rahman	371	0.3	N/A
Independent	Hasina Banu Shirin	365	0.3	N/A
Zaker Party	Md. Julfikar Ali Mollah	228	0.2	−0.1
Majority		1,552	1.3	−6.3
Turnout		118,555	78.0	+21.1
AL gain from BNP				

General Election 1991: Khulna-3
Party	Candidate	Votes	%	±%
BNP	Ashraf Hossain	38,872	40.3	
AL	Monnujan Sufian	31,502	32.7	
JP(E)	S. M. A. Rob	14,246	14.8	
Jamaat	AKM Yusuf	9,100	9.4	
IOJ	Ali Hossein	2,343	2.4	
Zaker Party	Sheikh Shah Jamal	256	0.3	
JSD	Shahjahan	105	0.1	
Majority		7,370	7.6	
Turnout		96,424	56.9	
BNP gain from JP(E)				
