= Ashraf Hossain =

Bangladeshi politician (died 2020)

Member of Bangladesh Parliament
- In office 1996–1991
- Preceded by: Abdul Gaffar Biswas
- Succeeded by: Kazi Sekandar Ali
- In office 2001–2006
- Preceded by: Kazi Sekandar Ali
- Succeeded by: Monnujan Sufian

Personal details
- Died: 18 July 2020 Dhaka, Bangladesh
- Party: Bangladesh Nationalist Party

Ashraf Hossain (died 18 July 2020) was a Bangladesh Nationalist Party politician who served as member of parliament for Khulna-3.

== Career ==
Hossain was elected to parliament from Khulna-3 as a Bangladesh Nationalist Party candidate in 1991 and 2001. He served as the whip in the Parliament.

== Death ==
Hossain died on 18 July 2020 in United Hospital, Dhaka, Bangladesh.
