= Sheikh Tonmoy =

Bangladeshi politician

- শেখ তন্ময়
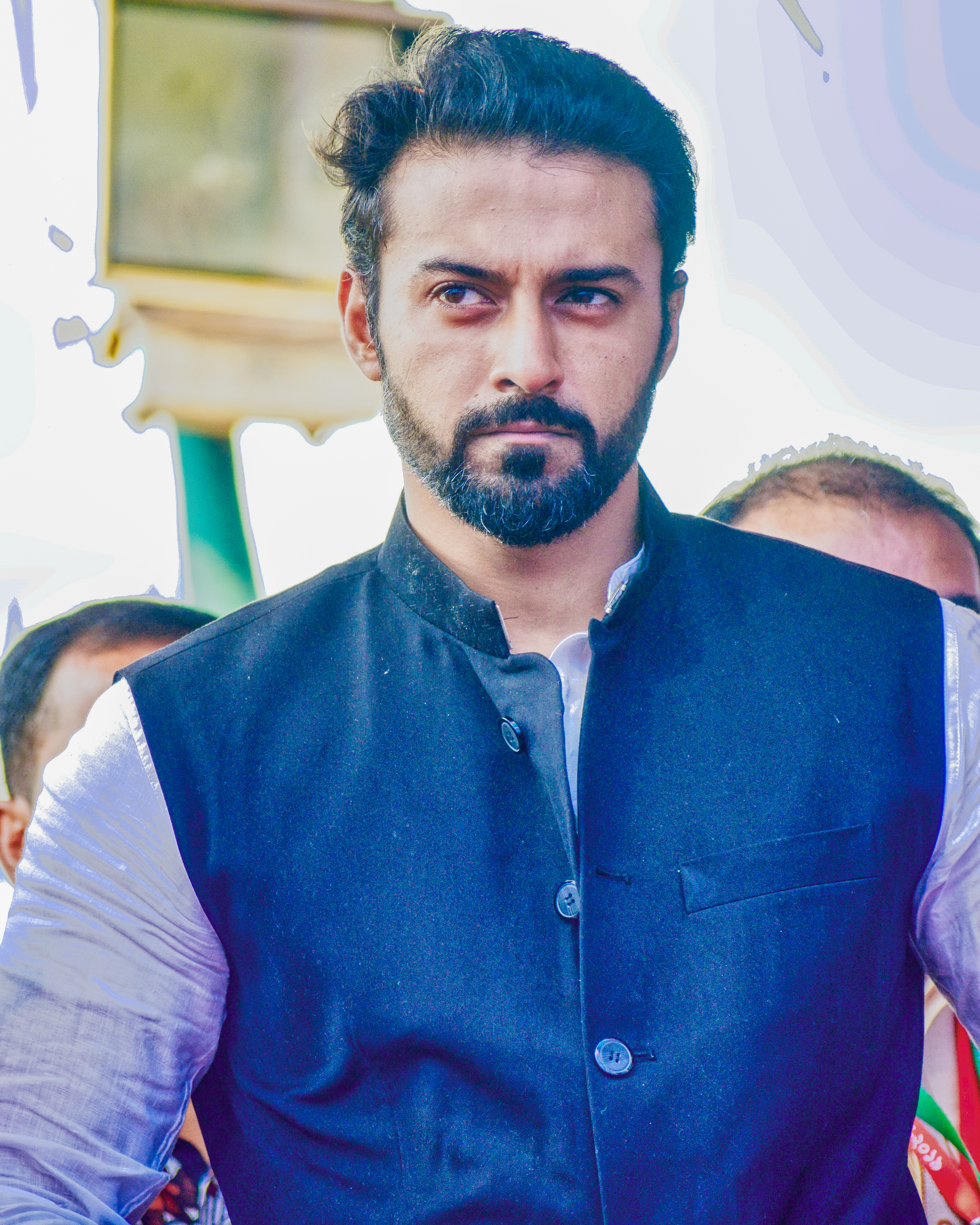
- Tonmoy in 2019

Member of the Bangladesh Parliament for Bagerhat-2
- In office 3 January 2019 – 6 August 2024
- Preceded by: Mir Showkat Ali Badsha

Personal details
- Born: 29 June 1987 (age 39) Dhaka, Bangladesh
- Party: Bangladesh Awami League
- Parents: Sheikh Helal Uddin (father); Rupa Chowdhury (mother)
- Relatives: see Tungipara Sheikh family

Sheikh Sharhan Naser Tonmoy best known as Sheikh Tonmoy is a Bangladesh Awami League politician and a former member of Jatiya Sangsad representing the Bagerhat-2 constituency. He is a grand-nephew of Sheikh Mujibur Rahman, nephew of Sheikh Hasina, and second-cousin of Sajeeb Wazed, Saima Wazed & Tulip Siddiq. He has been missing along with all of his family members since the fall of his aunt Sheikh Hasina's government on 5 August 2024.

== Early life ==
Tonmoy's father is Sheikh Helal Uddin, member of parliament for Bagerhat-1 and cousin of Prime Minister Sheikh Hasina. He completed his higher studies in London, United Kingdom.

== Career ==
Tonmoy was elected to Parliament on 30 December 2018 from Bagerhat-2 as a Bangladesh Awami League candidate.

Tonmoy started his career journey with a job at a company in Singapore. Although he was born into a political family and didn't become politically active until 2017, he joined the Bangladesh Awami League as a member from Bagerhat Municipal Branch. That was his formal joining in politics.
