= Piljang Union =

Piljang Union পিলজংগ ইউনিয়ন
- Union
- Piljang Union
- Country: Bangladesh
- Division: Khulna
- District: Bagerhat
- Upazila: Fakirhat

Area
  - Total: 29.78 km^{2} (11.50 sq mi)

Population (2011)
  - Total: 22,367
  - Density: 751.1/km^{2} (1,945/sq mi)
- Time zone: UTC+6 (BST)
- Website: piljangaup.bagerhat.gov.bd

Piljang Union (Bengali: পিলজংগ ইউনিয়ন) is a Union parishad under Fakirhat Upazila of Bagerhat District in the division of Khulna, Bangladesh. It has an area of 29.78 km^{2} (11.50 sq mi) and a population of 22,367.

== Villages ==
1. Town Nawapara
2. Bailtali
3. Shambagat
4. Piljong-1
5. Piljong-2
6. Piljong-3
7. Baliadonga-1
8. Baliadonga-2
9. Baliadonga-1
