= Amir Ejaz Khan =

Bangladeshi politician

- আমির এজাজ খান

Member of Parliament
- Incumbent
- Assumed office 13 February 2026
- Preceded by: Nani Gopal Mandal
- Constituency: Khulna-1

Personal details
- Born: 12 March 1972 (age 54) Khulna District, Bangladesh
- Party: Bangladesh Nationalist Party
- Occupation: Politician

Amir Ejaz Khan is a Bangladeshi politician. He was elected as the Member of Parliament for the Khulna-1 constituency in the 2026 Bangladeshi general election held on 13 February 2026.

== Political career ==
Amir Ejaz Khan is a senior member of the Bangladesh Nationalist Party and has been active in political campaigns in the Khulna region for several years.

In the 13th national parliamentary election held on 13 February 2026, Amir Ejaz Khan won the Khulna‑1 seat as the BNP candidate. He received 121,352 votes, defeating his closest rival Krishna Nandi of the Bangladesh Jamaat–e–Islami, who received 70,346 votes.
