= Mir Shakawat Ali Daru =

Bangladeshi politician

Mir Sakhawat Ali Daru
- মীর সাখাওয়াত আলী দারু

Member of Parliament from Undivided Khulna-3
- In office 1973–1979
- Preceded by: Start (gain independence)
- Succeeded by: Aftab Uddin Hawlader

Member of Parliament from Bagerhat-2
- In office June 1996 – 2001
- Preceded by: Abu Saleh Mohammad Mustafizur Rahman
- Succeeded by: MAH Salim

Personal details
- Born: Bagerhat, Khulna.
- Party: Bangladesh Awami League
- Spouse: Farida Akhter Banu Lucy
- Relations: Mir Showkat Ali Badsha (brother)
- Children: 1 daughter

Mir Shakawat Ali Daru is a Bangladesh Awami League politician. he was an elected member of the National Assembly of Pakistan in 1970, elected member of parliament in undivided Khulna-3 constituency in 1973 and elected member of parliament for the Bagerhat-2 constituency in June 1996.

== Birth and early life ==
Mir Sakhawat Ali Daru was born in Bagerhat district of Khulna Division.

== Career ==
Daru was elected member of the National Assembly of Pakistan in 1970, elected member of parliament in the undivided Khulna-3 constituency in 1973 and elected member of parliament for the Bagerhat-2 constituency in June 1996.
