= Sheikh Helal Uddin =

Bangladeshi politician

- শেখ হেলাল উদ্দিন
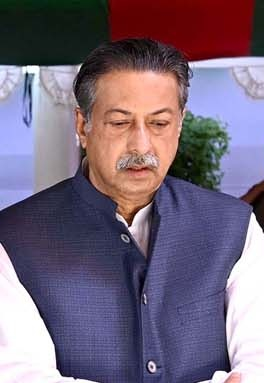
- Helal in 2024

Member of Parliament
- In office September 1996 – 6 August 2024
- Preceded by: Sheikh Mujibur Rahman
- Succeeded by: Vacant
- Constituency: Bagerhat-1

Personal details
- Born: 1 January 1961 (age 65) Dacca, East Pakistan, Pakistan
- Party: Bangladesh Awami League
- Spouse: Rupa Chowdhury
- Relations: Sheikh Salahuddin Jewel (brother); Andaleeve Rahman (son in law)
- Children: Tonmoy
- Parent: Sheikh Abu Naser (father)
- Relatives: Tungipara Sheikh family
- Education: Jhenaidah Cadet College (HSC)

Sheikh Helal Uddin (born 1 January 1961) is a Bangladesh Awami League politician and a former member of Jatiya Sangsad representing the Bagerhat-1 constituency during 1996–2024. He has been missing since the fall of his cousin Sheikh Hasina's government on 5 August 2024.

== Early life ==
Sheikh Helal was born on 1 January 1961 to the Sheikh family of Tungipara from Gopalganj, Faridpur district, East Pakistan. He completed his high school education at Jhenaidah Cadet College as a member of the 9th intake, graduating in 1978. His father Sheikh Naser was the younger brother of Sheikh Mujibur Rahman, the first president of Bangladesh, and was assassinated alongside him. He is the cousin of former Prime Minister Sheikh Hasina.

== Career ==
Sheikh Helal's election rally in Mollahat Upazila in 2001 was bombed by members of Harkat-ul-Jihad al-Islami. He was elected to parliament from Bagerhat-1 in 1996 in a by-election after former Prime Minister Sheikh Hasina abdicated the seat. He was re-elected in 2001 from Bagerhat-1. He won the Bagerhat-1 seat by by-election in April 2009 unopposed after the other two candidates were disqualified by Bangladesh Election Commission. He was re-elected in Bagerhat-1 in 2014.

== Personal life ==
Sheikh Helal's son, Sheikh Sharhan Naser Tonmoy (Sheikh Tonmoy), is a Bangladesh Awami League politician and member of parliament who was elected in the 2018 election from Bagerhat-2. He is married to Rupa Chowdhury. His brother, Sheikh Salahuddin Jewel, is the member of parliament from Khulna-2.
