= Sheikh Razzak Ali =

Bangladeshi politician

- শেখ রাজ্জাক আলী
- Ali heading a parliamentary committee

7th Speaker of the Jatiya Sangsad
- In office 12 October 1991 – 14 July 1996
- Deputy: Humayun Khan Panni; L. K. Siddiqi
- Preceded by: Abdur Rahman Biswas
- Succeeded by: Humayun Rashid Chowdhury

5th Deputy Speaker of the Jatiya Sangsad
- In office 5 April 1991 – 25 September 1991
- Speaker: Abdur Rahman Biswas
- Preceded by: Md. Reazuddin Ahmed
- Succeeded by: Humayun Khan Panni

Personal details
- Born: 28 August 1928 Paikgachha Upazila, Khulna District, Bengal Presidency, British India
- Died: 7 June 2015 (aged 86) Khulna, Bangladesh
- Party: Bangladesh Nationalist Party, Liberal Democratic Party
- Spouse: Begum Majeda Ali (m. 1953)
- Children: Five daughters
- Education: University of Dhaka (M.A. 1952, LL.B. 1954, M.A. 1967)
- Occupation: Politician

Sheikh Razzak Ali (28 August 1928 – 7 June 2015) was a Bangladeshi politician, Deputy Law Minister of State and Deputy Speaker and two time Speaker of Bangladesh Jatiya Sangsad. Ali died on 7 June 2015.

== Early life ==
Born in 1928 in Hitampur village, Paikgacha in Khulna district, Ali obtained his MA in economics from Dhaka University in 1952. He obtained his LLB from Dhaka University in 1954 and later his MA in Bengali literature from the same university. He actively participated in the Language Movement of 1952, mass-upsurge of 1969, the Liberation War of Bangladesh in 1971 and movement against autocracy during 1982–1990.

== Career ==
=== Teacher ===
Between 1949 and 1950, Ali worked as a teacher in the RKBK Harishchandra Collegiate School of Prafulla Chandra Ray in Paikgachha Upazila.

=== Journalist ===
In the early 1950s, he started his career as a journalist briefly working for the then Pakistan Observer as a reporter and as a commercial editor for the Weekly Pakistan Post.

=== Lawyer ===
Ali began his legal practice in the District Judge's Court of Khulna in 1958 and was enrolled in Dhaka High Court Bar in 1963. He then was elected as the President of Khulna Bar in 1964 and as its general secretary in 1972 before being elected member of the Bangladesh Bar Council in 1973. He was also elected as the President of Jessore District Bar several terms. He founded Khulna City Law College of which he acted as vice-principal. Later, he was made principal of the college and remained in this post for 25 years.

=== Politician ===
Razzak Ali was known for his honesty and integrity throughout his political career. He was a founding member of the Bangladesh Nationalist Party (BNP), founding President of Khulna District BNP from 1979 to 1991 and also was the Member of the BNP Standing Committee. He was elected first vice-chairman of BNP in 1992. After becoming Speaker he relinquished the post of party vice-chairman.

Ali at the BNP with Khaleda Zia

In 1979, he was elected Member of Parliament from Khulna-5 constituency and then from Khulna-2 constituency in 1991 and 1996.

He was appointed State Minister for law and Justice on 20 March 1991. On 5 April 1991, he was elected as Deputy Speaker and was unanimously elected as the Speaker of the 5th Parliament on 12 October 1991, a position he held until 1996. In June 1992, he attended the 1st Conference of the Speakers of the SAARC Countries (Colombo, Sri Lanka) and was elected the President of Association of SAARC Speakers and Parliamentarians. In September of the same year, he presided over the IPU conference held in Stockholm (Sweden) as the vice-president. He was re-elected in 1996 as the Speaker of the 6th Parliament. He presided over the session which passed the Caretaker Government Bill on 15 February 1996.

Ali chairing a session at the UN

In 2006, he resigned from the BNP to join the Liberal Democratic Party (Bangladesh) as its Executive President. He quit politics in 2009.

=== Diplomat ===
Ali was Bangladesh High Commissioner to the UK between 2002 and 2003, when he resigned from his position.

Ali as UK high-commissioner meeting Queen Elizabeth II

== Charitable activities ==
Ali was the founding Principal of Khulna City Law College. He also established Sundarban College of Khulna. He was the founder of Saburonnssa Women College, Boyra Secondary School, Tutparha Secondary School, Shaheed Zia Secondary College and Paikgacha Degree College of Khulna. He also was one of the founders of Majid Memorial City College, Khulna University, Khulna Medical College, Khulna Mahila Alia Madrasha and Hazi Foyez Uddin Secondary School. He is the founder President of Shiromoni Eye Hospital of Khulna. He was the founding trustee of Bangladesh Legal Aid and Services Trust (BLAST) and a founding member of the Lions Club Eye Hospital in Khulna. He also founded the City Law College mosque, Hitampur Jamay mosque and Kopilmoni Shah Jafar Awlia mosque.
