= Sheikh Salahuddin Jewel =

Bangladeshi politician

- শেখ সালাউদ্দীন জুয়েল
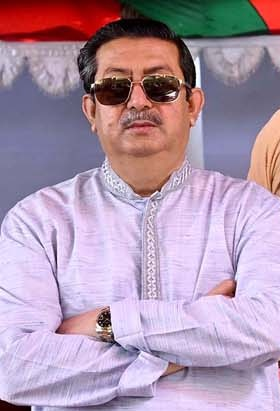
- Jewel in 2024

Member of the Bangladesh Parliament for Khulna-2
- In office 30 January 2019 – 6 August 2024
- Preceded by: Mohammad Mizanur Rahman
- Succeeded by: Sk. Zahangir Hossain Helal

Personal details
- Born: January 1, 1967 (age 59) Dhaka, East Pakistan, Pakistan
- Party: Bangladesh Awami League
- Parent: Sheikh Abu Naser (father)
- Relatives: Tungipara Sheikh family

Sheikh Salahuddin Jewel (born 1 January 1967) is a Bangladesh Awami League politician, who served as a Member of Jatiya Sangsad representing the Khulna-2 constituency. He is a nephew of Sheikh Mujibur Rahman and a cousin of former Prime Minister Sheikh Hasina.

== Early life ==
Jewel is the second son of Sheikh Abu Naser, younger brother of Sheikh Mujibur Rahman. Prime Minister Sheikh Hasina is his cousin.

== Career ==
Jewel was elected to parliament on 30 December 2018 from Khulna-2 as a Bangladesh Awami League candidate.
