= Mulghar Union =

Mulghar Union মূলঘর ইউনিয়ন
- Union
- Mulghar Union
- Country: Bangladesh
- Division: Khulna
- District: Bagerhat
- Upazila: Fakirhat

Area
  - Total: 48.25 km^{2} (18.63 sq mi)

Population (2011)
  - Total: 18,640
  - Density: 386.3/km^{2} (1,001/sq mi)
- Time zone: UTC+6 (BST)
- Website: mulgharup.bagerhat.gov.bd

Mulghar Union (Bengali: বেতাগা ইউনিয়ন) is a Union Parishad under Fakirhat Upazila of Bagerhat District in the division of Khulna, Bangladesh. It has an area of 48.25 km2 (18.63 sq mi) and a population of 18,640.

== Demography ==
Religion (2022)
Religion	Percent
Hinduism	53.89%
Islam	45.97%
Others	0.14%
