= Altaf Hossain (politician) =

Bangladeshi politician

- আলতাফ হোসেন

Member of Parliament from Bagerhat-4
- In office 1986–1988
- Succeeded by: Mia Abbas Uddin

Personal details
- Born: c. 1934
- Died: 3 May 2009 Bangladesh Medical College and Hospital
- Party: Bangladesh Nationalist Party
- Other political affiliations: Jatiya Party (Ershad)

Altaf Hossain (c. 1934-3 May 2009) was a Bangladesh Nationalist Party politician. He was elected a member of parliament from Bagerhat-4 in 1986.

== Early life ==
Altaf Hossain was born in about 1934 in Bagerhat District.

== Career ==
Altaf Hossain was a lawyer. He served as union parishad chairman for a long time and as Morelganj Upazila chairman. In 1962, he was elected a member of the then East Pakistan Provincial Council and appointed parliamentary secretary. he was elected to parliament from Bagerhat-4 as a Jatiya Party candidate in the 1986 Bangladeshi general election. After that he joined the BNP and was nominated as a member of the central committee.

He was defeated from Bagerhat-4 constituency on 12 June 1996 on the nomination of Bangladesh Nationalist Party.

== Death ==
Altaf Hossain died on 3 May 2009 while undergoing treatment at Bangladesh Medical College and Hospital.
