= Bagerhat-1 =

Constituency of Bangladesh's Jatiya Sangsad

Coordinates: 22.78°N 89.70°E

- Constituency for the Jatiya Sangsad
- District: Bagerhat District
- Division: Khulna Division
- Electorate: 375,560 (2026)

Current constituency
- Created: 1984
- Party: Bangladesh Jamaat-e-Islami
- Member: Md. Moshiur Rahman Khan
- ← 94 Narail-2 96 Bagerhat-2 →

Bagerhat-1 is a constituency represented in the Jatiya Sangsad (National Parliament) of Bangladesh since 2026 by Md. Moshiur Rahman Khan of the Bangladesh Jamaat-e-Islami.

== Boundaries ==
The constituency encompasses Fakirhat, Mollahat, and Chitalmari upazilas.

== History ==
The constituency was created in 1984 from the Khulna-1 constituency when the former Khulna District was split into three districts: Bagerhat, Khulna, and Satkhira.

In 2025, the Election Commission announced that it would reduce the number of constituencies in Bagerhat District from four to three. They said they were evening out voters per constituency to ensure balanced representation. Their redistricting would have moved Fakirhat Upazila from Bagerhat-1 to Bagerhat-2, Bagerhat Sadar Upazila from Bagerhat-2 to Bagerhat-1, Kachua Upazila from Bagerhat-2 to Bagerhat-3, Rampal and Mongla upazilas from Bagerhat-3 to Bagerhat-2, and Morrelganj and Sarankhola upazilas from Bagerhat-4 to Bagerhat-3. Locals objected to the changes.

The High Court found that eliminating Bagerhat-4 solely because of low population was unsound and not supported by demographic data. They invalidated the changes, and their decision was upheld on appeal. So the 2026 general election went ahead with the long-standing constituency boundaries.

== Members of Parliament ==
Election	Member	Party
1986	MA Khayer	Awami League
1988	Sheikh Abdul Hye Bachchu	Jatiya Party
1991	Mozammel Hossain	Awami League
Feb 1996	Sheikh Mujibur Rahman	Bangladesh Nationalist Party
1996 by-election	Sheikh Helal	Awami League
2001	Sheikh Helal	Awami League
2008 by-election	Sheikh Helal	Awami League
2014	Sheikh Helal	Awami League
2024	Sheikh Helal	Awami League
2024	Sheikh Helal	Awami League
2026	Md. Moshiur Rahman Khan	Bangladesh Jamaat-e-Islami

== Elections ==
=== Elections in the 2020s ===
General Election 2026: Bagerhat-1
Party	Candidate	Votes	%	±%
Jamaat	Md. Moshiur Rahman Khan	117,527	48.0	N/A
BNP	Kapil Krishna Mandal	114,323	46.7	N/A
Independent	Md. Sheikh Masud Rana	6,467	2.6	N/A
Independent	MAH Selim	5,283	2.2	N/A
JP(E)	S. M. Golam Sarwar	571	0.2	N/A
AB Party	Md. Aminul Islam	291	0.1	N/A
BML	M. D. Shamsul Haque	242	0.1	N/A
Bangladesh Muslim League-BML	A. Sabur Sheikh	167	0.1	N/A
Majority		3,204	1.3	N/A
Turnout		244,871	65.2	N/A
Jamaat gain from AL				

=== Elections in the 2010s ===
Sheikh Helal Uddin was re-elected unopposed in the 2014 general election after opposition parties withdrew their candidacies in a boycott of the election.

=== Elections in the 2000s ===
Sheikh Hasina stood for three seats in the 2008 general election: Bagerhat-1, Rangpur-6, and Gopalganj-3. After winning all three, she chose to represent Gopalganj-3 and quit the other two, triggering by-elections in them. Helal Uddin was elected unopposed in March 2009 after the Election Commission disqualified the other two candidates in the by-election scheduled for April 2009.

General Election 2008: Bagerhat-1
Party	Candidate	Votes	%	±%
AL	Sheikh Hasina	142,979	68.3	+12.1
BNP	Sheikh Wahiduzzaman Dipu	58,533	28.0	−15.8
IAB	Md. Liakat Ali	7,522	3.6	N/A
NPP	Sheikh Shawkat Hossain	288	0.1	N/A
Majority		84,446	40.3	+28.0
Turnout		209,322	89.4	+7.6
AL hold				

General Election 2001: Bagerhat-1
Party	Candidate	Votes	%	±%
AL	Sheikh Helal Uddin	106,235	56.2	
BNP	Rumeen Farhana	82,922	43.8	
Majority		23,313	12.3	
Turnout		189,157	81.8	
AL hold				

=== Elections in the 1990s ===
Sheikh Hasina stood for three seats in the June 1996 general election: Bagerhat-1, Khulna-1, and Gopalganj-3. After winning all three, she chose to represent Gopalganj-3 and quit the other two, triggering by-elections in them. Helal Uddin was elected in a September 1996 by-election.

General Election June 1996: Bagerhat-1
Party	Candidate	Votes	%	±%
AL	Sheikh Hasina	77,342	51.4	+3.2
BNP	Rumeen Farhana	47,299	31.4	+0.2
IOJ	Moulana Siddiqur Rahman	9,912	6.6	+6.3
Jamaat	Md. Ahad Ali	8,463	5.6	N/A
JP(E)	S.M. Shafiqul Islam	5,977	4.0	+3.7
Jatiya Samajtantrik Dal-JSD	Surandra Nath Sikdar	586	0.4	−0.9
Bangladesh Tafsil Jati Federation (S.K. Mandal)	Sawpan Kumar Mandal	350	0.2	N/A
Democratic Republican Party	Md. Arafatul Islam	275	0.2	N/A
Zaker Party	Muniruzzaman	234	0.2	−0.3
Independent	Binoy Krisna Poddar	179	0.1	N/A
Majority		30,043	19.9	+2.9
Turnout		150,617	82.8	+23.0
AL hold				

General Election 1991: Bagerhat-1
Party	Candidate	Votes	%	±%
AL	Mozammel Hossain	62,045	48.2	
BNP	Sheikh Mujibar Rahman	40,155	31.2	
BKA	Maulana Siddiqur Rahman	21,123	16.4	
Jatiya Samajtantrik Dal-JSD	Sheik Kamruzzaman	1,728	1.3	
NAP (Muzaffar)	S. M. Sabur	1,525	1.2	
Zaker Party	S. M. Nizamul Haq	641	0.5	
Pragotishi Jatiatabadi Dal (Nurul A Moula)	Sheikh Shawkat Hossain Nilu	494	0.4	
JP(E)	Sheik A Hai	442	0.3	
IOJ	Khelafot Hossain	361	0.3	
Bangladesh Muslim League (Matin)	A Sabur Sheik	154	0.1	
Majority		21,890	17.0	
Turnout		128,668	59.8	
AL gain from JP(E)				
