= Sheikh Abul Hossain (Khulna politician) =

Bangladeshi politician

- শেখ আবুল হোসেন

Member of Bangladesh Parliament

Personal details
- Party: Jatiya Party (Ershad)

Sheikh Abul Hossain is a Jatiya Party (Ershad) politician in Bangladesh and a former member of parliament for Khulna-1.

== Career ==
Hossain was elected to parliament from Khulna-1 as a Jatiya Party candidate in 1988.
