= Abdul Gaffar Biswas =

Bangladeshi politician

Member of Bangladesh Parliament

Personal details
- Born: 27 August 1949 (age 77) Khulna
- Party: Jatiya Party (Ershad)

Abdul Gaffar Biswas is a Bangladeshi businessman and Jatiya Party (Ershad) politician and a former member of parliament for Khulna-3.

== Career ==
Biswas was elected to parliament from Khulna-3 as a Jatiya Party candidate in 1988. He is president of Khulna KDA New Market's Owners Association, Khulna Divisional Fuel Distributors Association, and Khulna Bus-Truck and Covered-Van Owners Association. His sons, Shible Biswas and Sohel Biswas, were arrested in September 2007 in Khulna City with unclear charges. He is the president of Khulna City unit of Jatiya Party and vice chairmen in central committee. In 2010, he was sued by Destiny Group for allegedly trying to extort them.
