= Sheikh Abdul Hye Bachchu =

Bangladeshi politician

Member of Parliament
- In office 1988–1991

Personal details
- Party: Bangladesh Jatiya Party

Sheikh Abdul Hye Bacchu is a Bangladesh Jatiya politician in Bangladesh and former member of parliament from Bagerhat-1.

== Career ==
Bachchu was elected to parliament from Bagerhat-1 as a candidate of Jatiya Party in 1988. He claimed to have close ties with Prime Minister Sheikh Hasina. In 2011 he opened a deep sea fishing company, Eden Fisheries Ltd, and by 2013 had bought 11 ships for 1.5 billion taka.

Bachchu served as the chairman of Basic Bank from September 2009 to 2013. Basic Bank is a state owned bank in Bangladesh.

== Controversy ==
During Bachchu's chairmanship more than 20 billion taka was embezzled from the bank. In 2015 Bangladesh Anti Corruption Commission filed 56 cases regarding the corruption in the bank. According to Bangladesh Bank, 45 billion taka in total was embezzled from the bank from 2010 to 2013, during the chairmanship of Bachchu. In July 2017 Bangladesh High Court ordered Bangladesh Anti Corruption Commission to investigate his alleged role in the Basic Bank scam. He was interrogated by Bangladesh Anti Corruption Commission on 5 December 2017 for the first time since the cases were filed. He was interrogated by the Commission again on 8 January 2018. According to the investigation of Bangladesh Financial Intelligence Unit in 2014, 200 million taka was transferred from firms that received fraudulent loans from Basic Bank to the accounts of the younger brother of Bachchu. Bachchu's younger brother, Sheikh Shariar Panna, used to help arrange loans from the bank while taking a large percentage of the loans as "consultancy fees". The Finance Minister of Bangladesh, Abul Maal Abdul Muhith, said that massive embezzlement took place in Basic Bank and that Bachchu was responsible for it.
