= Teligati Union, Morrelganj =

Teligati Union তেলিগাতী ইউনিয়ন
- Union
- Teligati Union
- Country: Bangladesh
- Division: Khulna
- District: Bagerhat
- Upazila: Morrelganj

Area
  - Total: 51.98 km^{2} (20.07 sq mi)

Population (2011)
  - Total: 13,871
  - Density: 266.9/km^{2} (691.1/sq mi)
- Time zone: UTC+6 (BST)
- Website: teligatiup.bagerhat.gov.bd

Teligati Union (Bengali: তেলিগাতী ইউনিয়ন) is a Union Parishad under Morrelganj Upazila of Bagerhat District in Khulna Division, Bangladesh. It has an area of 51.98 km2 (20.07 sq mi) and a population of 13,871 (2011).
