= Nani Gopal Mandal =

Bangladeshi politician

- ননি গোপাল মন্ডল

Member of the Bangladesh Parliament for Khulna-4
- In office 10 January 2024 – 6 August 2024
- Preceded by: Panchanan Biswas
- Succeeded by: Amir Ejaz Khan
- In office 25 January 2009 – 29 January 2014
- Preceded by: Panchanan Biswas

Personal details
- Born: 9 November 1950 (age 75)
- Party: Bangladesh Awami League

Nani Gopal Mandal (born 1950) is a Bangladesh Awami League politician and a former Jatiya Sangsad member presenting the Khulna-4 constituency during 2009–2014 and in 2024. He also represented the constituency from 2008 to 2014.

== Career ==
Mandal was elected to parliament from Khulna-1 as a Bangladesh Awami League candidate in 2008. He contested the 5 January 2014, election as an independent candidate after failing to get the nomination from Bangladesh Awami League.

== Controversy ==
Mandal was accused of assaulting Joyonti Rani, vice chairwoman of Dkope Upazila. His actions were condemned by the Upazila Parishad Association of Bangladesh. On 4 May 2012, an arrest warrant was issued against him by the Senior Judicial Magistrate's Court (Ga zone).
