= Kazi Sekendar Ali Dalim =

Bangladeshi politician (c.1945–2020)

Member of Parliament for Khulna-3
- In office 14 July 1996 – 13 July 2001
- Preceded by: Ashraf Hossain
- Succeeded by: Ashraf Hossain

Personal details
- Born: c. 1945
- Died: 14 January 2020 (aged 75)
- Party: Bangladesh Nationalist Party

Kazi Sekendar Ali Dalim (c. 1945 – 14 January 2020) was a Bangladesh Nationalist Party politician and a member of parliament for the Khulna-3 constituency.

== Biography ==
Dalim was a member of the executive committee of the Bangladesh Nationalist Party. He joined the Bangladesh Awami League in 1996 and was elected to parliament from Khulna-3 as a Bangladesh Awami League candidate in 1996. Later, he returned to the Bangladesh Nationalist Party.

Dalim died on 14 January 2020 at Combined Medical Hospital in Dhaka at the age of 75.
