= Khulna-2 =

Bangladeshi parliamentary constituency

Coordinates: 22.82°N 89.56°E

- Constituency for the Jatiya Sangsad
- District: Khulna District
- Division: Khulna Division
- Electorate: 335,241 (2026)

Current constituency
- Created: 1973
- Party: Bangladesh Jamaat-e-Islami
- Member: Sk. Zahangir Hossain Helal
- ← 99 Khulna-1 101 Khulna-3 →

Khulna-2 is a constituency represented in the Jatiya Sangsad (National Parliament) of Bangladesh since 2026 by Sk. Zahangir Hossain Helal of the Bangladesh Jamaat-e-Islami.

== Boundaries ==
The constituency encompasses Khulna Sadar and Sonadanga thanas.

== History ==
The constituency was created for the first general elections in newly independent Bangladesh, held in 1973.

Ahead of the 2008 general election, the Election Commission redrew constituency boundaries to reflect population changes revealed by the 2001 Bangladesh census. The 2008 redistricting altered the boundaries of the constituency.

In the 2018 general election, the constituency was one of six chosen by lottery to use electronic voting machines.

== Members of Parliament ==
Election	Member	Party
1973	Sheikh Abdur Rahman	Awami League
1979	Abu Saleh Md. Mustafizur Rahman	Bangladesh Nationalist Party
Major Boundary Changes
1986	Mohammad Mohsin	Jatiya Party (Ershad)
1988	Mia Musa Hossain	Jatiya Party (Ershad)
1991	Sheikh Razzak Ali	Bangladesh Nationalist Party
Nov 2001 by-election	Mohammad Ali Asghar Lobby	Bangladesh Nationalist Party
2008	Nazrul Islam Manju	Bangladesh Nationalist Party
2014	Mohammad Mizanur Rahman	Awami League
2018	Sheikh Salahuddin Jewel	Awami League
2024	Sheikh Salahuddin Jewel	Awami League
2026	Sk. Zahangir Hossain Helal	Bangladesh Jamaat-e-Islami

== Elections ==
=== Elections in the 2020s ===
General Election 2026: Khulna-2
Party	Candidate	Votes	%	±%
Jamaat	Sk. Zahangir Hossain Helal	93,789	51.54	+45.54
BNP	Nazrul Islam Manju	88,197	48.46	−1.54
Majority		5,592	3.08	−86.92
Turnout		190,101	56.7	+29.1
Registered electors		335,241		
Jamaat gain from AL				

=== Elections in the 2010s ===
General Election 2014: Khulna-2
Party	Candidate	Votes	%	±%
AL	Mohammad Mizanur Rahman	69,017	95.0	+45.9
Jatiya Party (M)	Rashida Karim	3,649	5.0	N/A
Majority		65,368	90.0	+89.1
Turnout		72,666	27.6	−48.7
AL gain from BNP				

=== Elections in the 2000s ===
General Election 2008: Khulna-2
Party	Candidate	Votes	%	±%
BNP	Nazrul Islam Manju	90,950	50.0	−7.8
AL	Muhammad Mizanur Rahman	89,280	49.1	+10.1
NAP	Md. Fajlur Rahman	1,081	0.6	N/A
United Citizen Movement	Kazi Faruq Ahmed	277	0.2	N/A
BSD	A. B. M. Nurul Alam	131	0.1	N/A
National People's Party	Sheikh Md. Jakir Hossen	97	0.1	N/A
Majority		1,670	0.9	−17.9
Turnout		181,816	76.3	+3.0
BNP hold				

Khaleda Zia stood for five seats in the October 2001 general election: Bogra-6, Bogra-7, Khulna-2, Feni-1, and Lakshmipur-2. After winning all five, she chose to represent Bogra-6 and quit the other four, triggering by-elections in them. Ali Asgar Lobi of the BNP was elected unopposed after the Awami League decided not to contest the by-election scheduled for November.

General Election 2001: Khulna-2
Party	Candidate	Votes	%	±%
BNP	Khaleda Zia	91,819	57.8	+10.9
AL	Manjurul Imam	62,021	39.0	−0.3
Independent	Mohammad Hossain Mukta	2,282	1.4	N/A
IJOF	Ferdous Khan	1,790	1.1	N/A
Independent	Tariqul Islam	697	0.4	N/A
Bangladesh Samajtantrik Dal (Basad-Khalekuzzaman)	Nurul Islam	207	0.1	N/A
Jatiya Party (M)	Syed Delowar Hossain	96	0.1	N/A
Majority		29,798	18.8	+11.2
Turnout		158,912	73.3	−8.8
BNP hold				

=== Elections in the 1990s ===
General Election June 1996: Khulna-2
Party	Candidate	Votes	%	±%
BNP	Sheikh Razzak Ali	65,306	46.9	+2.4
AL	Manjurul Imam	54,774	39.3	+9.1
Jamaat	Md. Ansar Uddin	8,426	6.0	−4.5
JP(E)	Mia Musa Hossain	7,333	5.3	+3.6
IOJ	Rafiqur Rahman	3,072	2.2	+0.7
Zaker Party	Nurul Haque	268	0.2	−0.4
Bangladesh Muslim League (Jamir Ali)	Ferdous Khan	106	0.1	N/A
Majority		10,532	7.6	−6.6
Turnout		139,285	82.1	+31.2
BNP hold				

General Election 1991: Khulna-2
Party	Candidate	Votes	%	±%
BNP	Sheikh Razzak Ali	41,590	44.5	
AL	Manjurul Imam	28,266	30.2	
Jamaat	Shamsur Rahman	9,856	10.5	
Independent	Sk. Abul Kashem	7,443	8.0	
JP(E)	Mia Musa Hossain	1,581	1.7	
IOJ	Ali Ahmed	1,410	1.5	
CPB	M. Firoz Ahmed	1,405	1.5	
Independent	Mukhtar Hussain	638	0.7	
Zaker Party	Kazi Ahmed Hasan	535	0.6	
Independent	A. U. Ahmed	364	0.4	
Bangladesh Samajtantrik Dal (Khalekuzzaman)	Nurul Alam	196	0.2	
Jatiya Samajtantrik Dal-JSD	Shushanta Kumar Nondi	125	0.1	
Bangladesh Muslim League (Kader)	Ferdous Khan	77	0.1	
Independent	Liakat Ali	33	0.0	
Majority		13,324	14.2	
Turnout		93,519	50.9	
BNP gain from JP(E)				
