= Sheikh Harunur Rashid =

Bangladeshi politician

- শেখ হারুনুর রশিদ

Member of Parliament

Personal details
- Party: Bangladesh Awami League

Sheikh Harunur Rashid is a Bangladesh Awami League politician and a former member of parliament from Khulna-1. He is the incumbent chairman of the Khulna Zilla Parishad.

== Career ==
Rashid was elected from Khulna-1 in 1986 as a candidate of the Bangladesh Awami League. He was reelected in 1996 from Khulna-1 as a candidate of the Bangladesh Awami League. He is the chairman of the Khulna Zilla Parishad.
