= Sheikh Abdur Rahman =

Bangladeshi politician

Member of Parliament from Khulna-2
- In office 1973–1975

Member of Parliament from Bagerhat-2
- In office 1986–1988

Personal details
- Party: Jatiya Party (Ershad)
- Other political affiliations: Bangladesh Awami League

Sheikh Abdur Rahman is a Jatiya Party (Ershad) politician in Bangladesh and a former member of parliament for Khulna-2 and Bagerhat-2.

== Career ==
Rahman was elected to parliament from Khulna-2 as a Bangladesh Awami League candidate in 1973. He was elected to parliament from Bagerhat-2 as a Jatiya Party candidate in 1986.
