= Md. Altaf Hossain =

Bangladeshi academic (1946–2020)

Md. Altaf Hossain was a Bangladeshi academic and former Vice-Chancellor of the University of Rajshahi.

== Early life and education ==
Hossain was born on 1946 in Chapai Nawabganj District, East Bengal, British India. He completed his Phd at Andhra University. He completed a second master's from the University of Dhaka in 1996.

== Career ==
Hossain joined the University of Rajshahi in 1976 as an Assistant Professor in the Department of Zoology.

Hossain was the Pro Vice-Chancellor of the University of Rajshahi from 27 August 1994 to 7 October 1996.

Hossain was appointed the Vice-Chancellor of the University of Rajshahi on 5 June 2005.

On 16 May 2008, Hossain was removed from the post of the Vice-Chancellor of the University of Rajshahi by the government of Bangladesh after an investigation of the by the University Grants Commission in the recruitment of 545 academics and staff personnel during the Bangladesh Nationalist Party government term. The Commission investigation had found evidence of financial irregularities. During his tenure he held no senate meetings at the university and following his removal students and staff at the university called for further investigation on the corruption allegations. Hossain had appeared at a hearing of the University Grants Commission. He continued working at the Department of Zoology till 2010. During his career he supervised 32 Phd students.

== Death ==
Hossain died on 5 November 2020 at Uposhahor, Rajshahi, Rajshahi District, Bangladesh.
