= Mir Showkat Ali Badsha =

Bangladeshi politician

Member of Parliament

Personal details
- Party: Bangladesh Awami League

Mir Showkat Ali Badsha (মীর শওকাত আলী বাদশা) is a Bangladesh Awami League politician and was the incumbent Member of Parliament from Bagerhat-2.

== Early life ==
Badsha was born on 31 December 1946. He has a M.A. and LLB degree.

== Career ==
Badsha was elected to Parliament from Bagerhat-2 in 2014 as a Bangladesh Awami League candidate. He is the chairperson of the Parliamentary Standing Committee on child rights. He is a member of the Treasury Bench. He is a member of the Parliamentary Standing Committee on the Fisheries and Livestock Ministry.
