= Mozammel Hossain =

Bangladeshi politician (1940–2020)

- মোজাম্মেল হোসেন

Member of Parliament for Bagerhat-1
- In office 5 March 1991 – 24 November 1995
- Preceded by: Sheikh Abdul Hai Bachchu
- Succeeded by: Sheikh Mujibur Rahman

Member of Parliament for Bagerhat-4
- In office 14 July 1996 – 13 July 2001
- Preceded by: Arshad-Uzzaman
- Succeeded by: Abdus Sattar Akon
- In office 29 January 2008 – 10 January 2020
- Preceded by: Abdus Sattar Akon

Minister of Women and Children Affairs
- In office 1996 – 1998

Personal details
- Born: 1 August 1940
- Died: 10 January 2020 (aged 79)
- Party: Awami League
- Children: Mahmood Hossain
- Education: Chittagong Medical College

Mozammel Hossain (1 August 1940 – 10 January 2020) was a Bangladesh Awami League politician and a member of parliament from Bagerhat-1 and Bagerhat-4.

== Early life ==
Hossain was born on 1 August 1940. He had passed M.B.B.S. from Chittagong Medical College.

== Career ==
Hossain was elected as a member of parliament from Bagerhat-1 in 1991. Later, he was elected from Bagerhat-4 in 1996. He was also elected to parliament in 2008, 2014 and 2018 from Bagerhat-4 as a Bangladesh Awami League candidate.

Hossain was appointed as the state minister of the Ministry of Social Welfare and Ministry of Women and Children Affairs in 1996. He was the chairperson of the Parliamentary Standing Committee of Ministry of Social Welfare.

== Death ==
On 10 January 2020, Hossain died from kidney disease at age 79.
