= Fakirhat Upazila =

Fakirhat ফকিরহাট
- Upazila
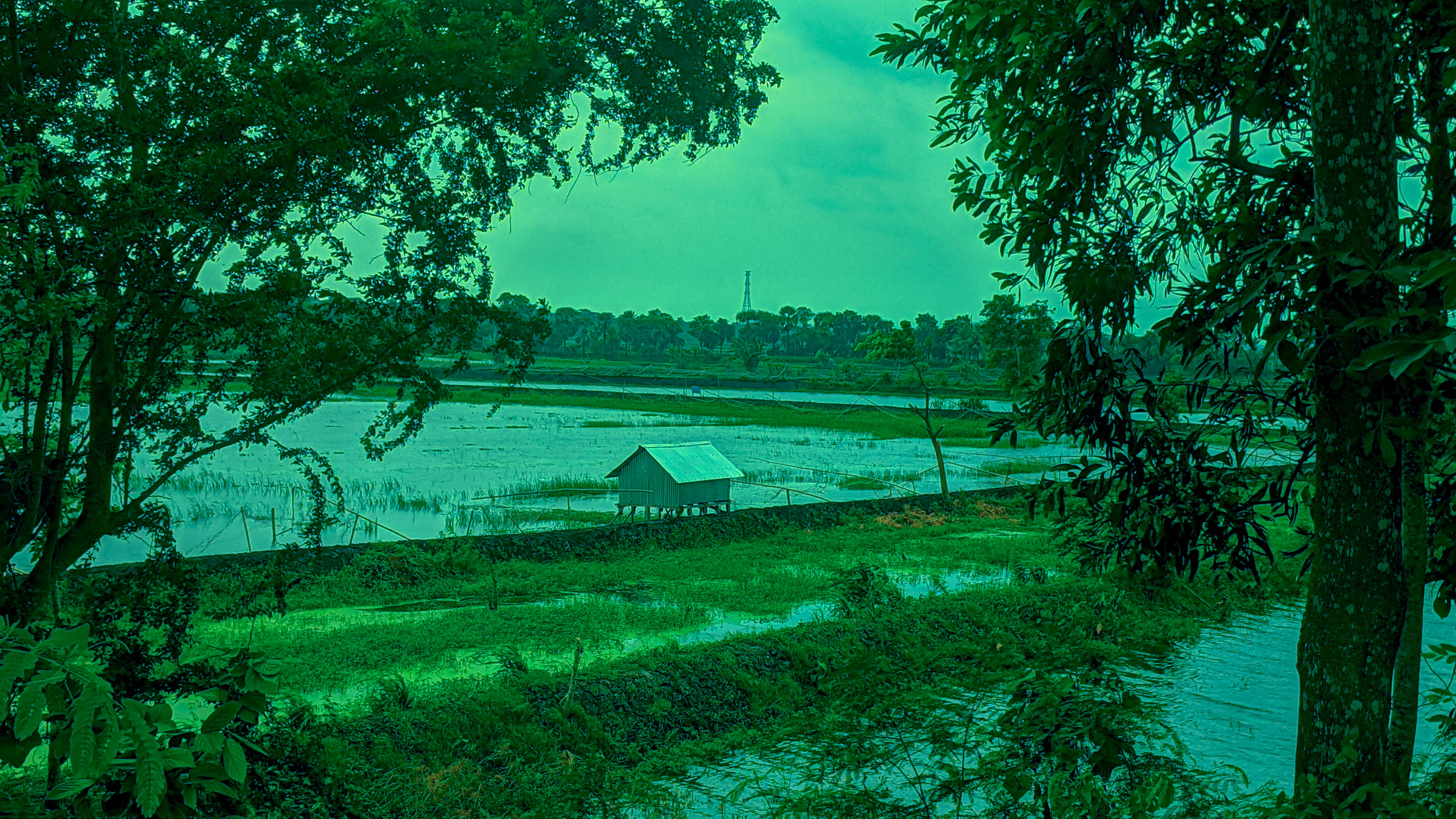
- A lake in Fakirhat

- Coordinates: 22°46.8′N 89°42.5′E
- Country: Bangladesh
- Division: Khulna
- District: Bagerhat

Area
  - Total: 160.68 km^{2} (62.04 sq mi)

Population (2022)
  - Total: 159,019
  - Density: 989.66/km^{2} (2,563.2/sq mi)
- Time zone: UTC+6 (BST)
- Postal code: 9360
- Area code: 04653
- Website: fakirhat.bagerhat.gov.bd

Fakirhat Upazila mauza geocode map

Fakirhat Upazila mauza geocode map

Fakirhat (Bengali: ফকিরহাট) is an upazila (sub-district) of Bagerhat District in the division of Khulna, Bangladesh. The medieval Sixty Dome Mosque (ষাট গম্বুজ মসজিদ) and the Khan Jahan Ali Mazar are situated here.

== History ==
During the War of Liberation, the freedom fighters' camp in Deyapara was suddenly attacked by the Razakars. People from both sides were killed and wounded. In the village of Jaria, many houses were set on fire by the East Pakistani Army and the Razakars. The famous leader from the village of Shatshaia, Jabbar Khan, was killed by the Razakars at Jaria.

== Geography ==
Fakirhat is located at 22.7806°N 89.7083°E. It has a total area of 160.68 km^{2}.

The upazila is bordered by Rupsa and Mollahat Upazilas to the north, Rampal Upazila to the south, Bagerhat Sadar and Chitalmari Upazilas to the east and Batiaghata and Rupsa Upazilas to the west. The main rivers are Rupsa, Bhairab and Chitra. The notable beels are Kalkolia and Foltita.

== Demographics ==
According to the 2022 Bangladeshi census, Fakirhat Upazila had 41,040 households and a population of 159,019. 8.63% were under 5 years of age. Fakirhat had a literacy rate of 82.20%: 83.80% for males and 80.62% for females, and a sex ratio of 99.62 males per 100 females. 31,059 (19.53%) lived in urban areas.

Religions in Fakirhat Upazila (2022)
| Religion | Percent |
| Islam | 79.15% |
| Hinduism | 20.83% |
| Other or not stated | 0.02% |

Population by religion in Union
| Union | Muslim | Hindu | Others |
|---|---|---|---|
| Bahirdia Mansa Union | 14,589 | 2,483 | 0 |
| Betaga Union | 9,323 | 5,198 | 0 |
| Fakirhat Union | 25,883 | 3,468 | 5 |
| Lakhpur Union | 23,044 | 1,857 | 2 |
| Mulghar Union | 7,310 | 8,571 | 22 |
| Naldha Mauvhog Union | 12,445 | 5,358 | 4 |
| Piljang Union | 20,331 | 2,815 | 5 |
| Suvhadia Union | 12,929 | 3,369 | 2 |

🟩 Muslim majority 🟧 Hindu majority

As of the 2011 Census of Bangladesh, Fakirhat upazila had 33,133 households and a population of 137,789. 25,693 (18.65%) were under 10 years of age. Fakirhat had an average literacy rate of 62.03%, compared to the national average of 51.8%, and a sex ratio of 985 females per 1000 males. 26,981 (19.58%) of the population lived in urban areas.

As of the 2001 Bangladesh census, Fakirhat has a population of 134,418 (male: 69327, female: 65091), including 98542 Muslims, 35797 Hindus, 44 Buddhists, and 35 others.

As of the 1991 Bangladesh census, Fakirhat's population was 123,956 people. 51.12% of the population were male, and females makd up 48.88%. Fakirhat had an average literacy rate of 43% for those 7 years and older, while the national average is of 32.4%. The literacy rate was 49% among males and 36.7% among females. 62.55% of the population were Muslim, 37.43% were Hindu and 0.02% followed other religions.

== Economy ==
=== Main occupations ===
38.15% of the population work in agriculture and 16.94% as agricultural laborers, 2.81% in fishing, 6.07% as wage laborers, 14.86% in commerce, 3.01% in transport, 8.3% in services and 9.86% in other occupations.

=== Land use ===
There are 10,072.03 hectares of arable land and 5,804.53 hectares of fallow land; single crop 64%, double crop 30% and treble land 6% land control. Among the peasants 33% are marginal, 35% small, 25% intermediary and 7% rich.

=== Crops ===
The main crops are Paddy, potatoes, betel leaf and vegetables. There are some crops nearing extinction, namely mustard seed, sweet potatoes and pulses.

=== Main fruits ===
The main fruits grown here are coconuts, boroi, areca nuts, bananas and betel nuts.

=== Fisheries, dairies and poultry farms ===
There are 7,463 fisheries, 33 dairies and 47 poultry farms.

=== Manufacturing ===
Fakirhat has 1 ice factory, 1 pharmaceutical company, 10 oil mills, 20 rice mills, 2 frozen shrimp preservation companies.

=== Cottage industries ===
There are 85 bamboo works, 52 goldsmiths, 65 blacksmiths, 136 woodworks, 30 potteries, 125 tailors and 15 kantha sewing workshops.

In addition there are 17 hat shops and bazaars; 6 fairs, most noted of which are Fakirhat, Lakhpur hat and Attaka Baishakhi Fair.

=== Main exports ===
The main exports are coconut, betel leaf, shrimp, and betel nut.

=== Non-governmental activities ===
The non-governmental activities in Fakirhat are Jagorani Chakra Foundation (JCF), Sukhee Manush, Drishtanto, Prodipon, Prisam, Viko Bangladesh, Nabolok, asa, brac, grameen bank and CARE.

=== Health centres ===
There is an Upazila health complex, eight family planning centres, a satellite clinic and seven community clinics.

== Arts and culture ==
There are five theater groups, 30 women's organisations and 25 rural clubs. There used to be a cinema hall.

== Points of interest ==
The archaeological sites of significance are Khanjahania Mosque, Sha-Awolia Bag Mazar and Mardan Pir Math, Tanker Per Mosque (Mulghair), Rural Orphan Centre, RRC.

There are 3 War of Liberation memorials and 1 memorial structure in Fakirhat.

== Administration ==
Fakirhat Upazila is divided into eight union parishads: Bahirdia Mansa, Betaga, Fakirhat, Lakhpur, Mulghar, Naldha Maubhog, Piljanga, and Subhadia. The union parishads are subdivided into 67 mauzas and 87 villages.

=== Fakirhat (town) ===
The area of the town is 22.09 km^{2}. It has a population of 23476; male 51.93%, female 48.07%. The density of population is 1063 per km^{2}. The literacy rate among the town's inhabitants is 47.4%. The town has one dak bungalow (rest house).

The administration of Fakirhat Thana was established in 1869; this was then turned into an upazila in 1983.

== Transport ==
Pucca roads cover a length of 61 kilometres (38 mi), semi pucca 10 kilometres (6.2 mi), and mud roads 563 kilometres (350 mi); waterways cover a length of 30-nautical-mile (56 km) and railways 10 kilometres (6.2 mi). There are three railway stations, but at present, all railway stations are inoperational.

The traditional means of transport are bullock cart and palanquin. These means of transport are extinct or nearly extinct.

== Education ==
Fakirhat's educational institutions include three colleges, a technical college, 24 non-government high schools, two government high schools, 27 madrasas, 53 government primary schools and 20 non-government primary schools. The noted institutions are Mulghar Government High School (1857), Bahirdia High School (1892), Betaga United M.L High School (1958).
