= Ghaghra Khan Bari Mosque =

Mosque in Mymensingh, Bangladesh

Ghaghra Khan Bari Jame Mosque
- ঘাঘড়া খাঁন বাড়ী মসজিদ
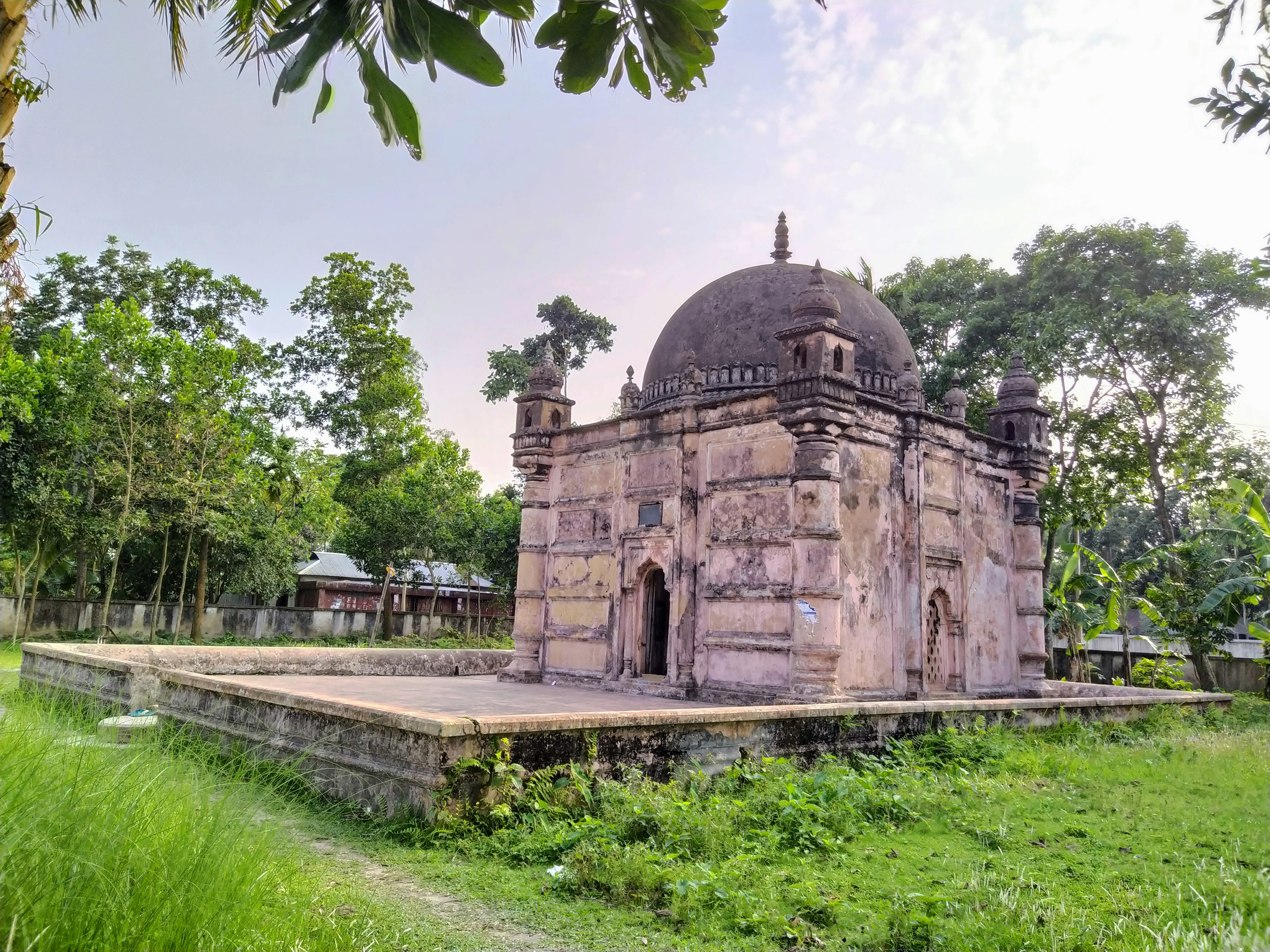

- Location of the mosque in Bangladesh

Religion
- Affiliation: Islam
- Ecclesiastical or organizational status: Mosque
- Status: Active

Location
- Location: Khan Bari, Ghaghra Laskar, Jhenaigati, Sherpur District, Mymensingh Division
- Country: Bangladesh
- Interactive map of Ghaghra Khan Bari Jame Mosque
- Administration: Department of Archaeology
- Coordinates: 25°06′46″N 90°02′14″E

Architecture
- Type: Mosque architecture
- Style: Mughal
- Founder: Azimullah Khan
- Established: 1028 AH (1618/1619 CE)

Specifications
- Capacity: 31 worshipers
- Length: 9.1 m (30 ft)
- Width: 9.1 m (30 ft)
- Dome: One
- Minaret: Ten

The Ghaghra Khan Bari Jame Mosque (Bengali: ঘাঘড়া খাঁন বাড়ী মসজিদ, Arabic: المسجد غغرا خان باري) is a medieval-era mosque located in the Khan Bari of the Ghaghra Laskar village in Hatibandha Union, Jhenaigati Upazila, Sherpur District, in the Mymensingh Division of northern Bangladesh. It is an example of Mughal architecture, and since 1999, its preservation has been entrusted to the country's Bangladeshi Department of Archaeology.

== History ==
The mosque was constructed in the Mughal era. A rock inscription at the door contains Arabic writing which states that the mosque was built in 1028 AH (1618/1619 CE). Many historians have suggested that the mosque was built at the time of rebel Hirangi Khan by Azimullah Khan.

== Description ==
There are two firm arches inside the mosque. The mosque has one dome which is 9.1 metres (30 ft) long and wide. There are ten small minarets at the top of the mosque too. A door is present in the eastern side. Inside, the mihrab and walls are designed with flowery patterns. The walls, made of gathuni lime and brick-dust, are 1.2 metres (4 ft). Of the total land area, 58% comprises the mosque, which is under the waqf by locals. The main building and balcony together makes up 17% with the remaining 41% forming a local cemetery near the building. It is adjacent to the Khan Bari eidgah.

== Gallery ==
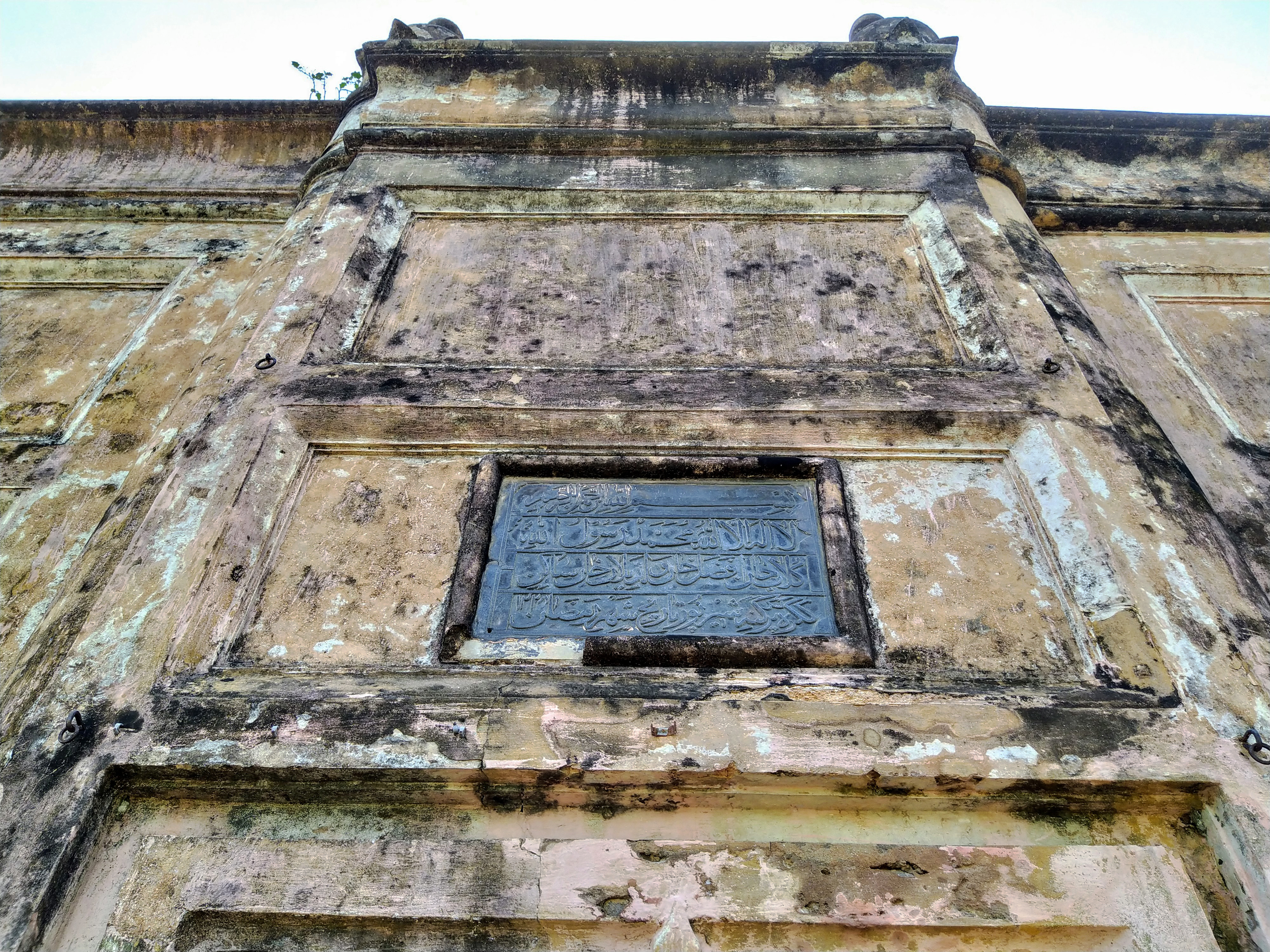
Arabic inscription

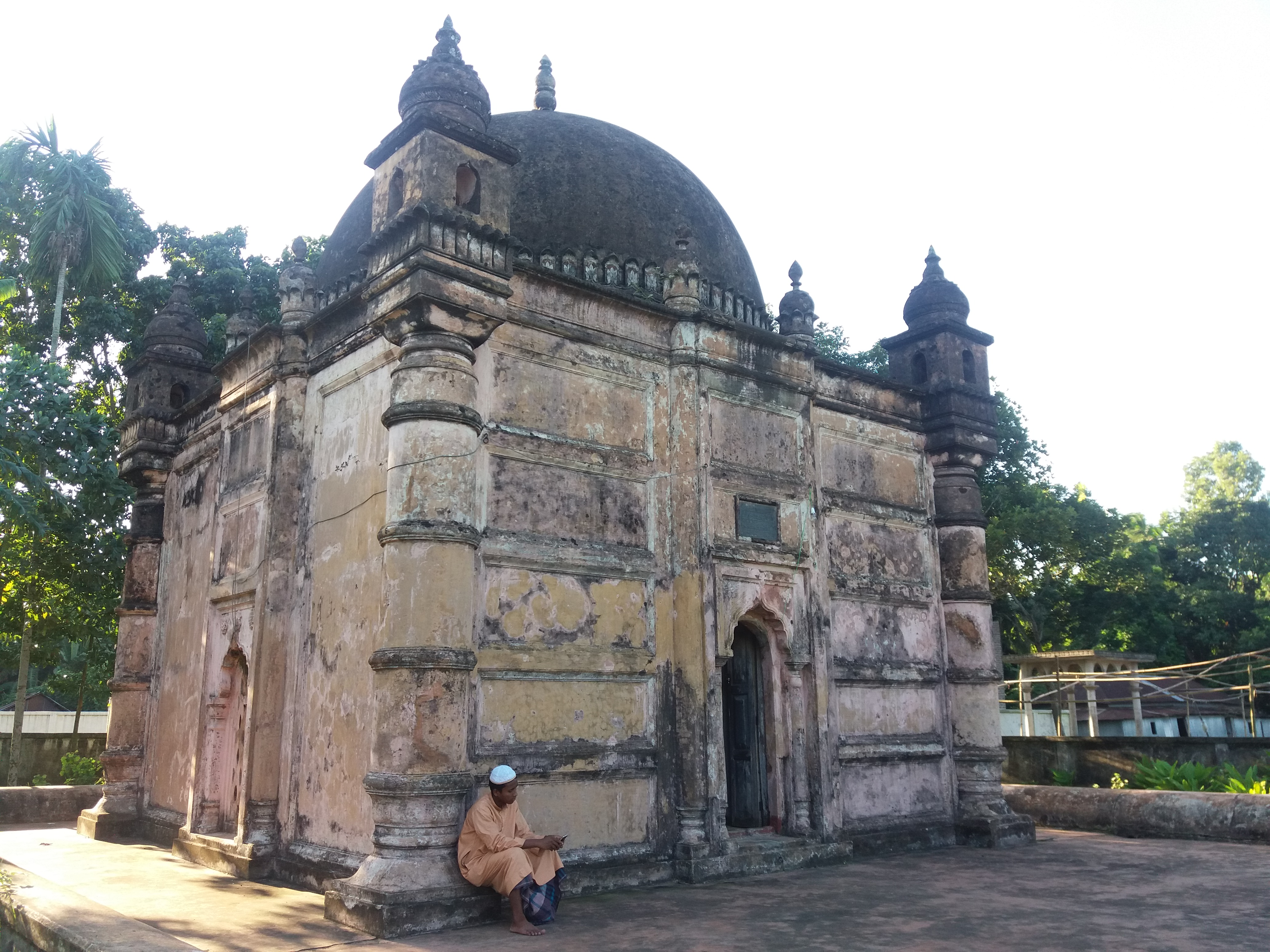
Closer view

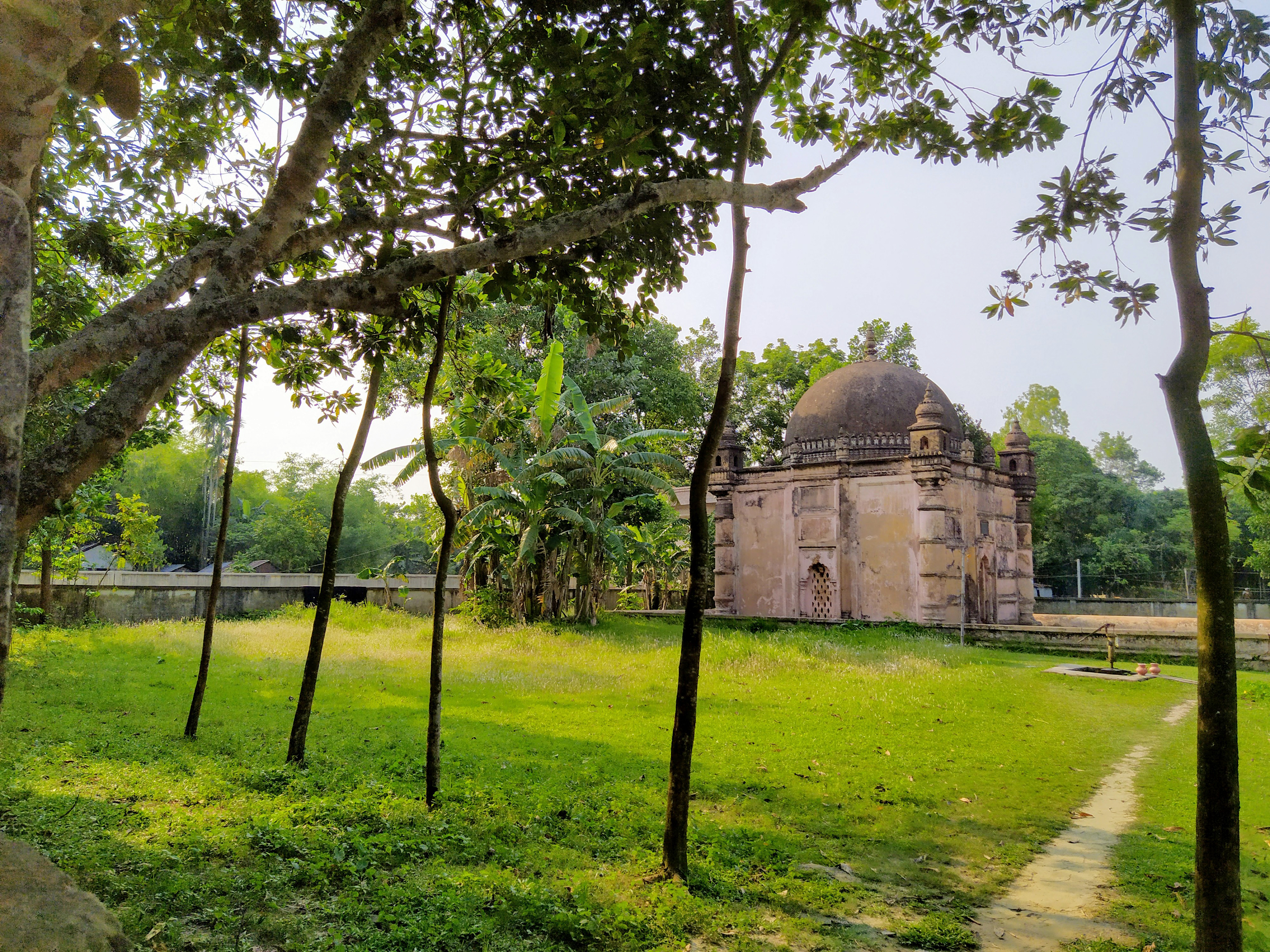
View from the front of left gate

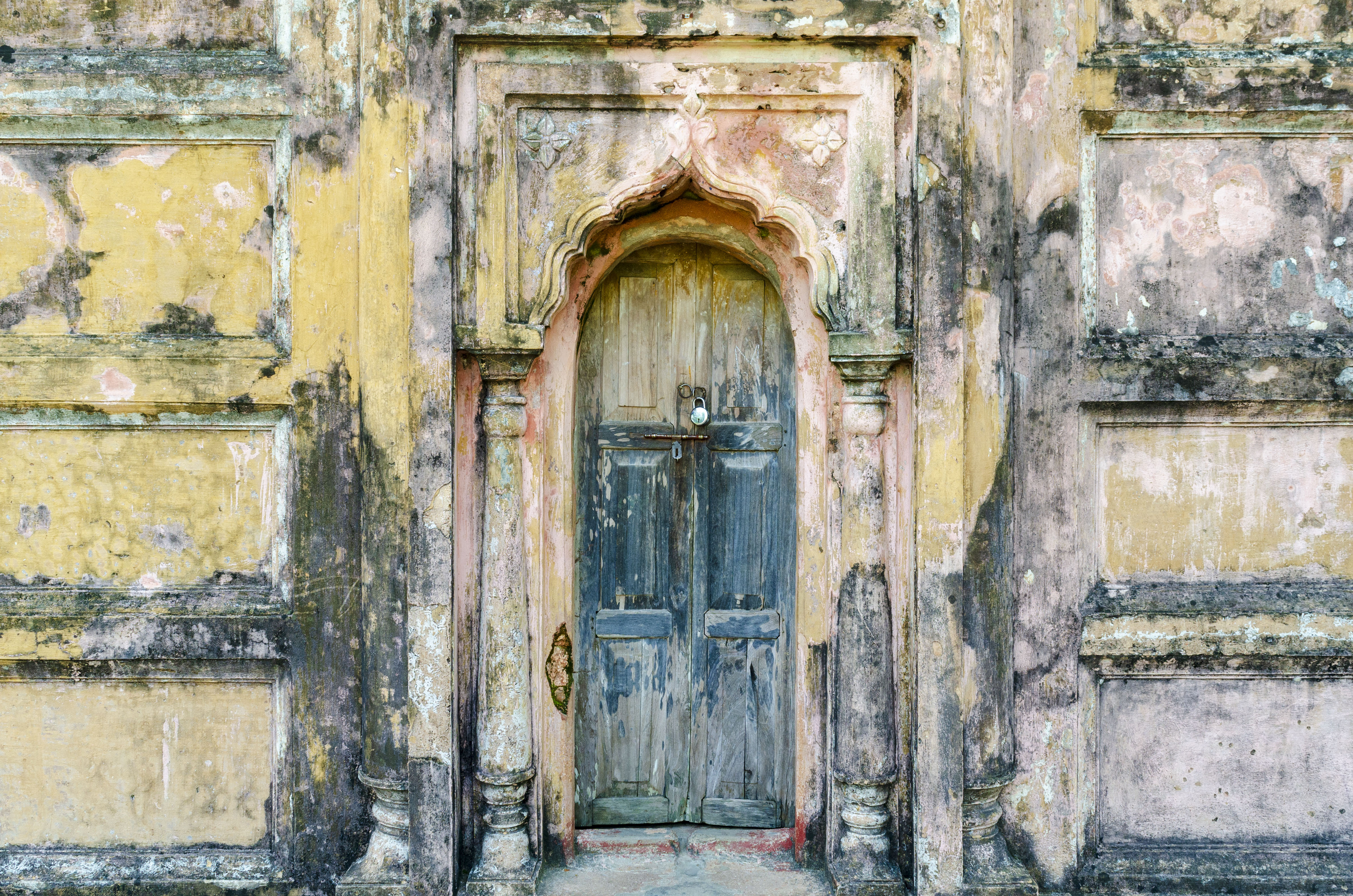
Door and wall designs

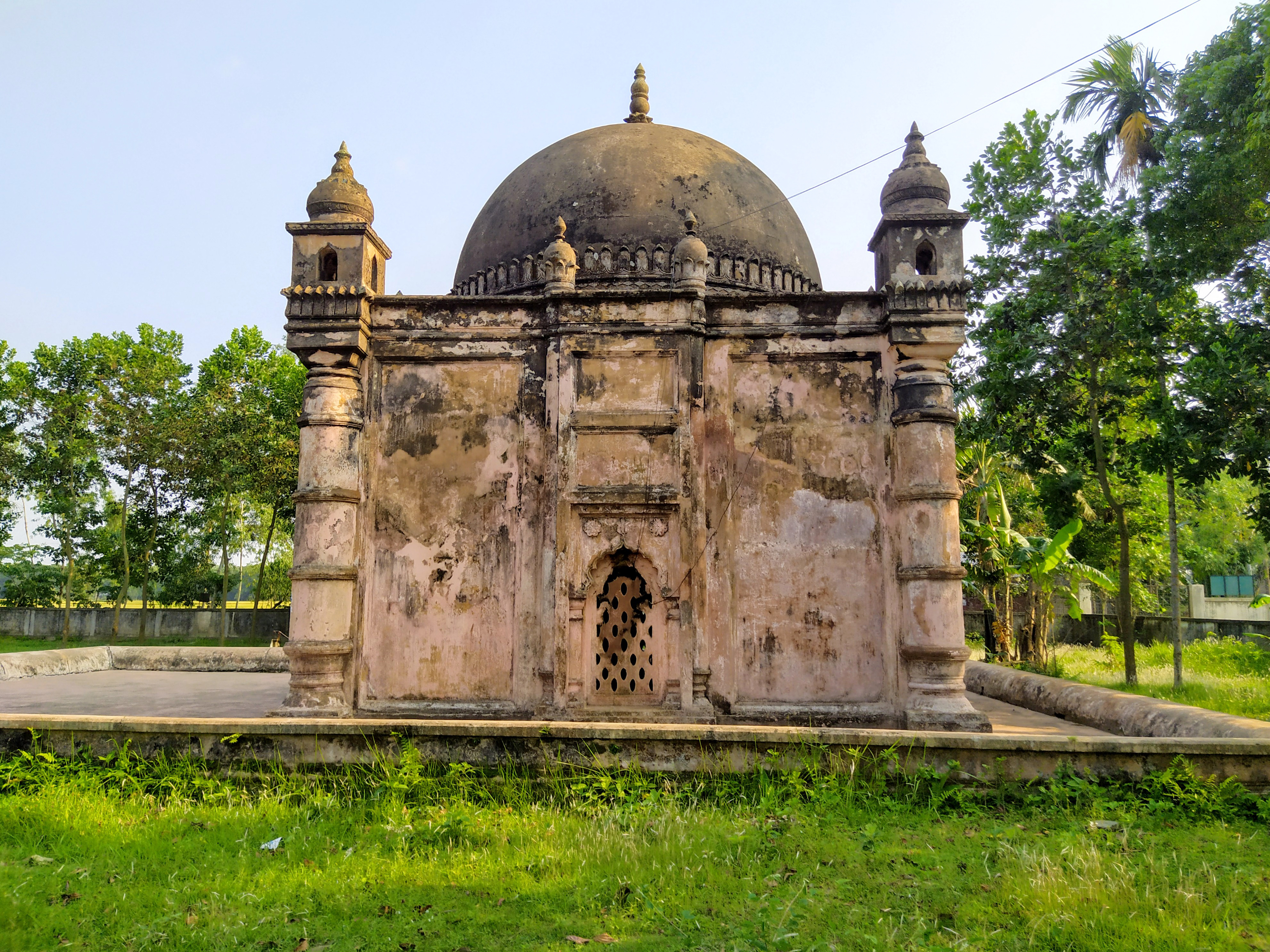
Right view

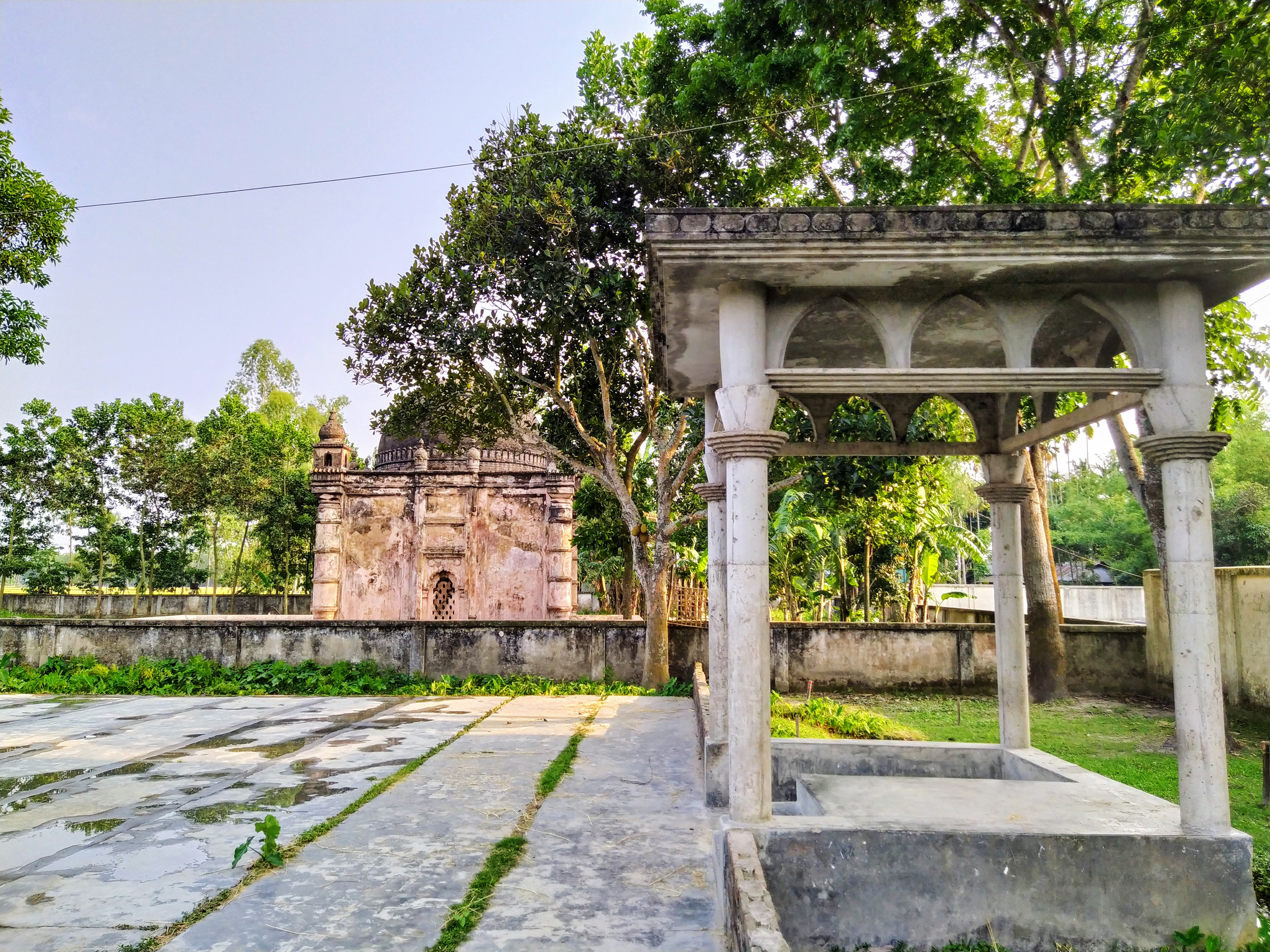
Adjacent eidgah

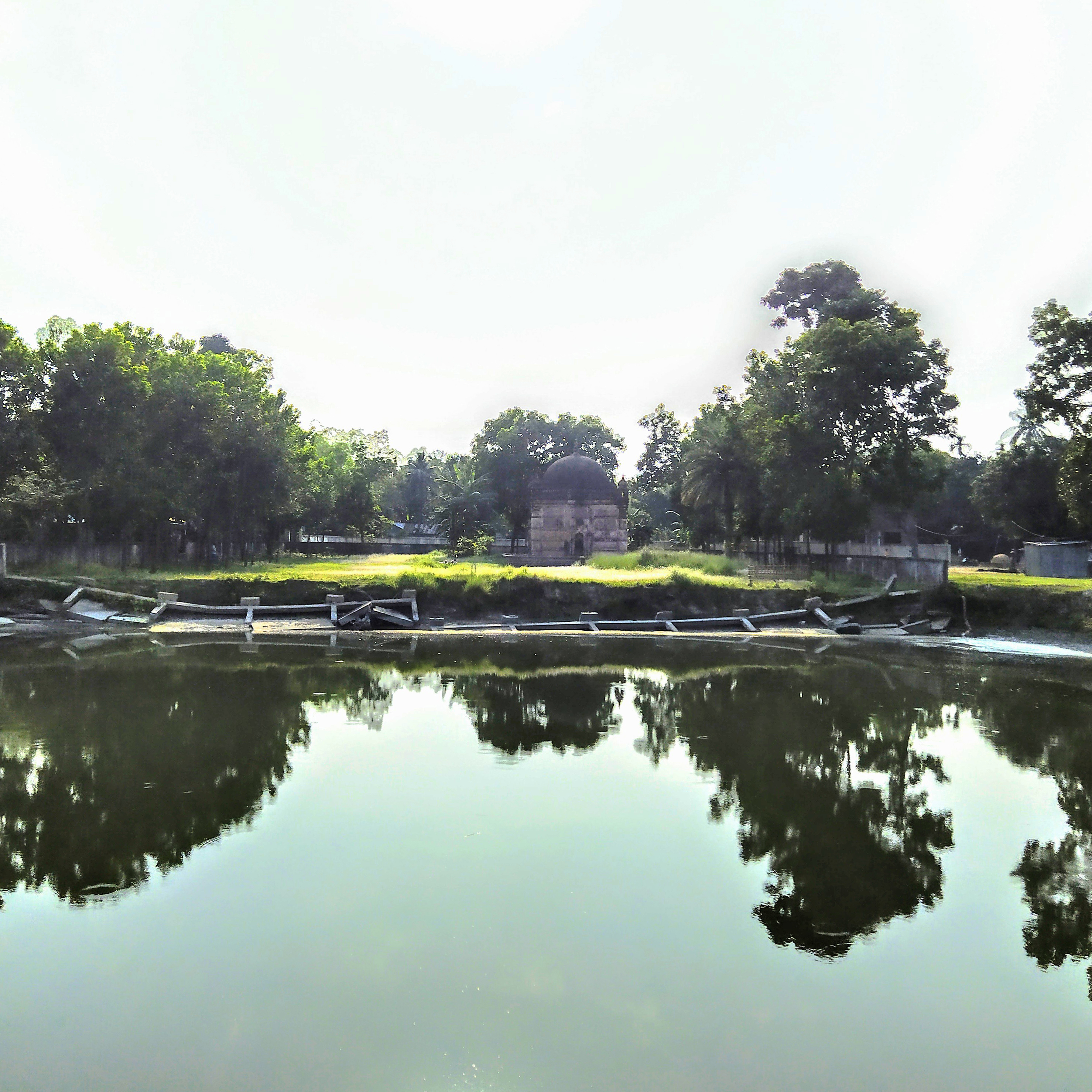
From nearby pond

== See also ==
- Islam in Bangladesh
- List of mosques in Bangladesh
