= Nayani Zamindar Bari =

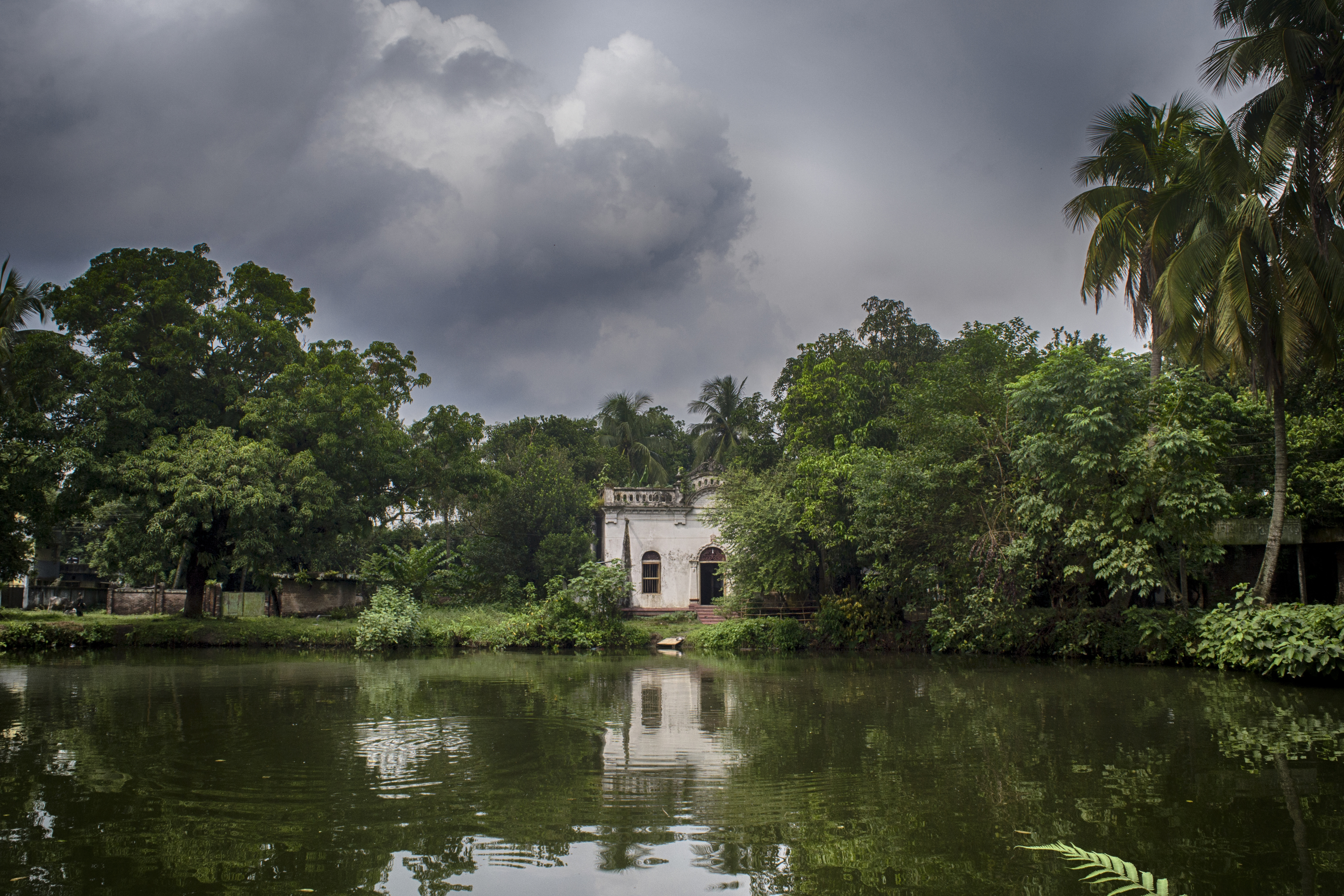

Religion
- Affiliation: Hinduism
- District: Sherpur

Location
- State: Mymensingh
- Country: Bangladesh

Architecture
- Creator: Nayani Zamindar

Nayani Zamindar Bari was a historical Hindu zamindar house located in what is now the Sherpur District of the Mymensingh Division of Bangladesh. The original building no longer exists, as it has been demolished. However, in 2014, the Department of Archaeology listed the site as an archaeological heritage site, even though no structures remain.

== History ==
Nayani Zamindar Bari was likely built either at the beginning of the nineteenth century or towards the end of the eighteenth century. At that time, the house was surrounded by water bodies, and several temples for worship were also constructed nearby. There was also a Rang Mahal (pleasure house) next to it.

After the abolition of the zamindari system in the Indian subcontinent and during the Partition of India in 1947, the then zamindar of Nayani left Bangladesh and moved to India.

After 1947, the zamindar house remained abandoned for some time. In 1964, Sherpur College was established. Later, Nayani Zamindar Bari and its Rang Mahal were opened up for the teachers and students of the college, and the building was used as a student dormitory.

From 1978 to 1984, the house first served as the office of the Sherpur Subdivision Administrator, and later as the office of the District Commissioner. In the early 1990s, the entire zamindar house was demolished, and new buildings for the District Commissioner’s office, Superintendent of Police, and District and Sessions Judge Court were built on the site.

== Gallery ==
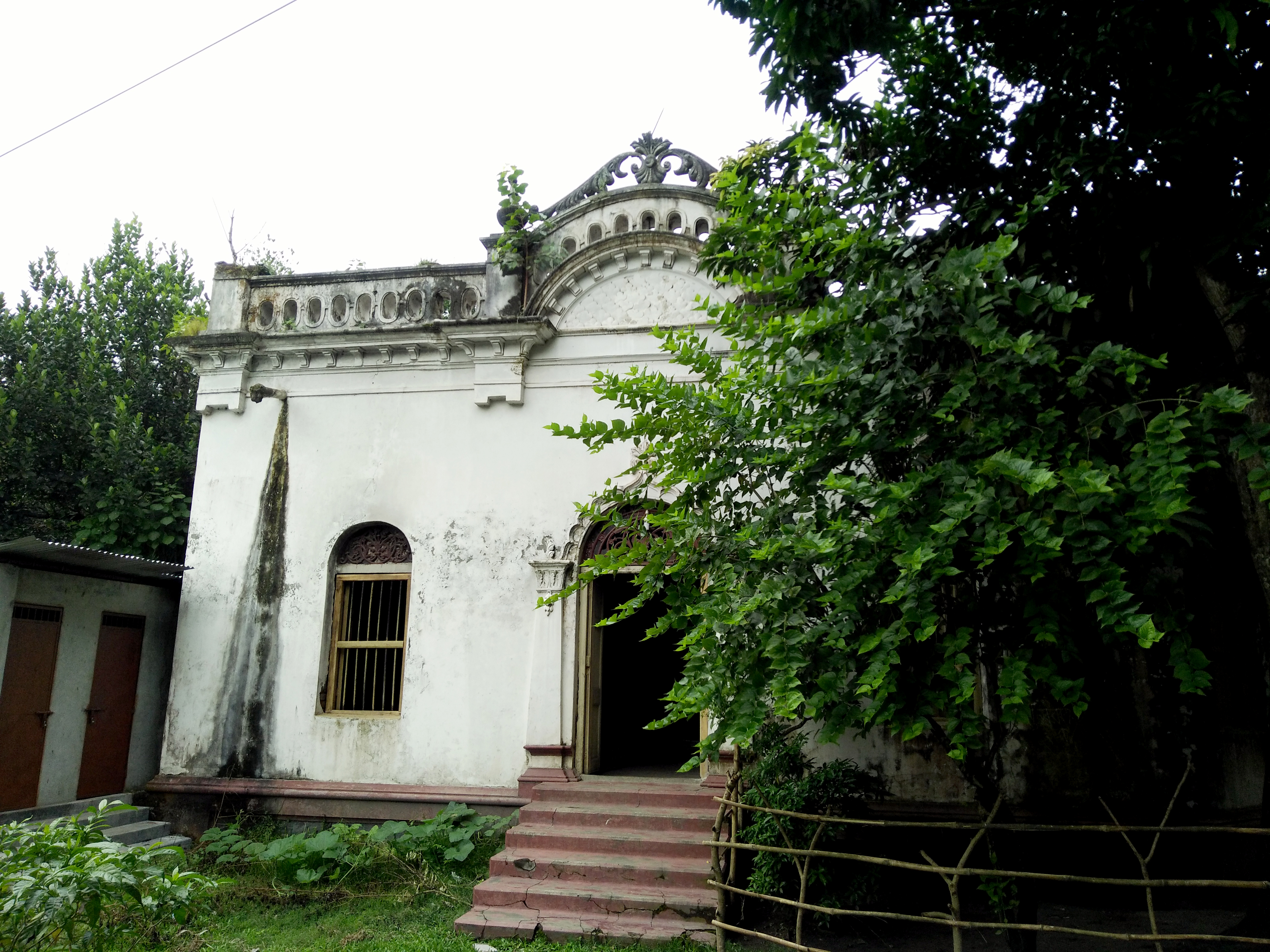

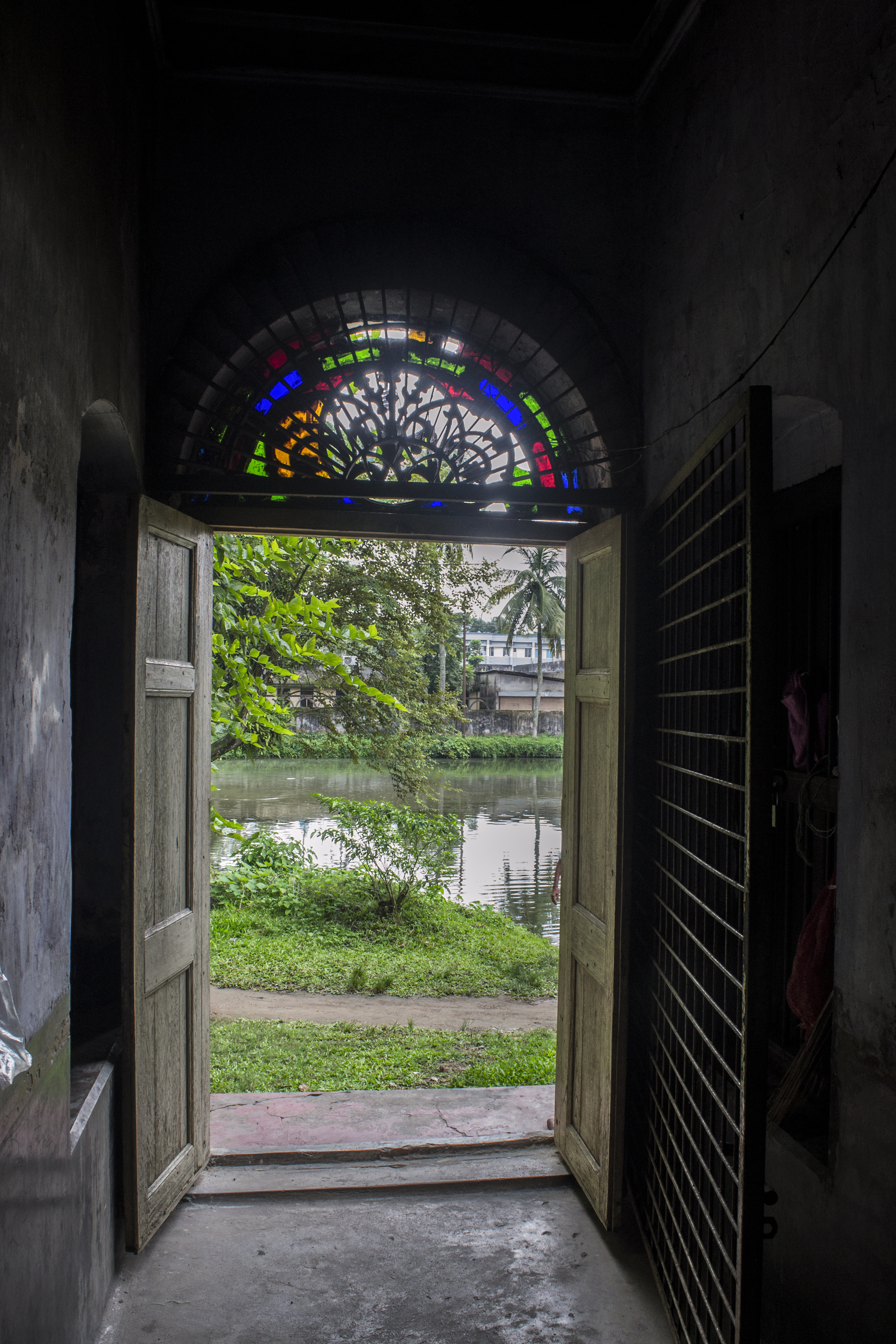

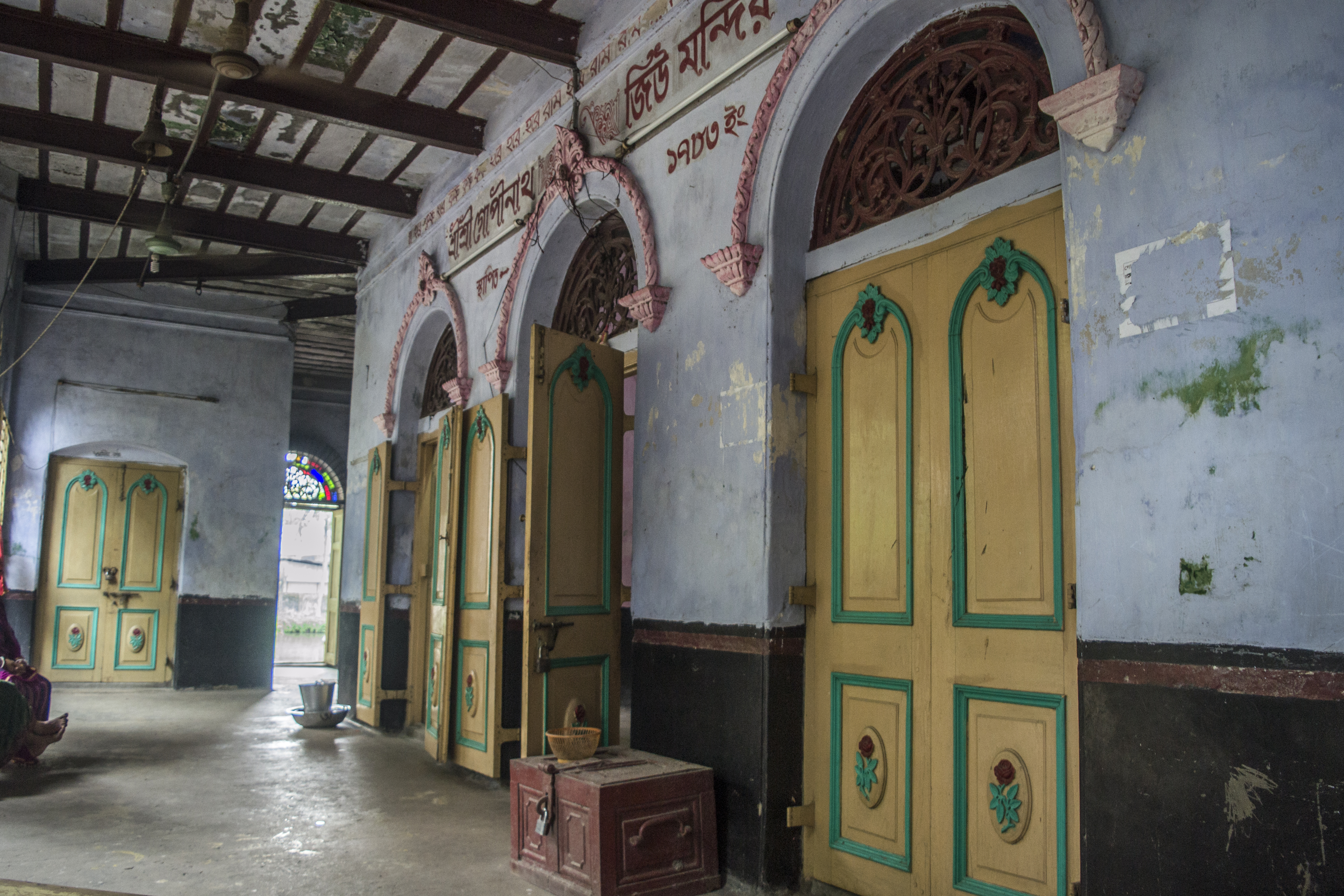

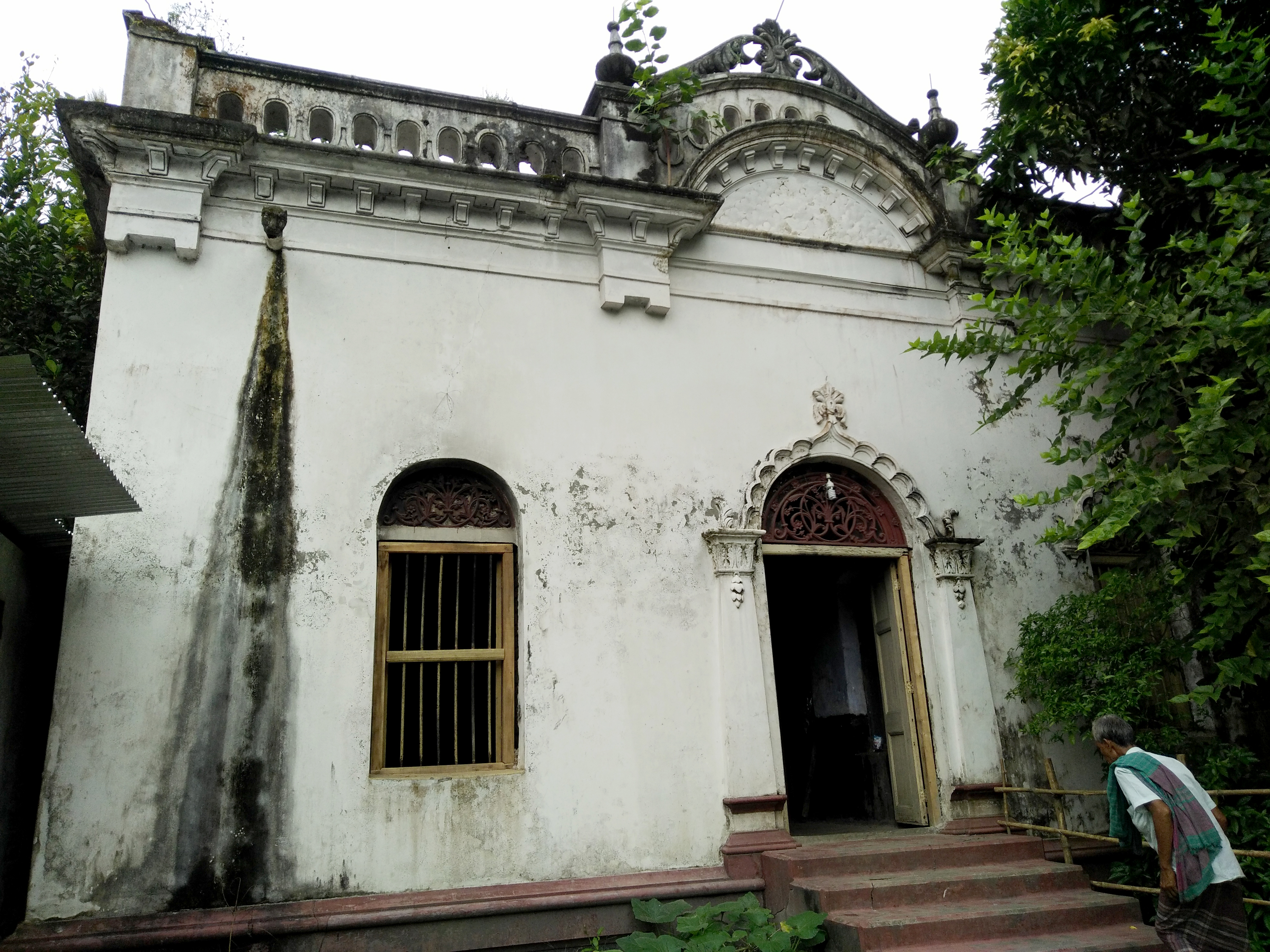

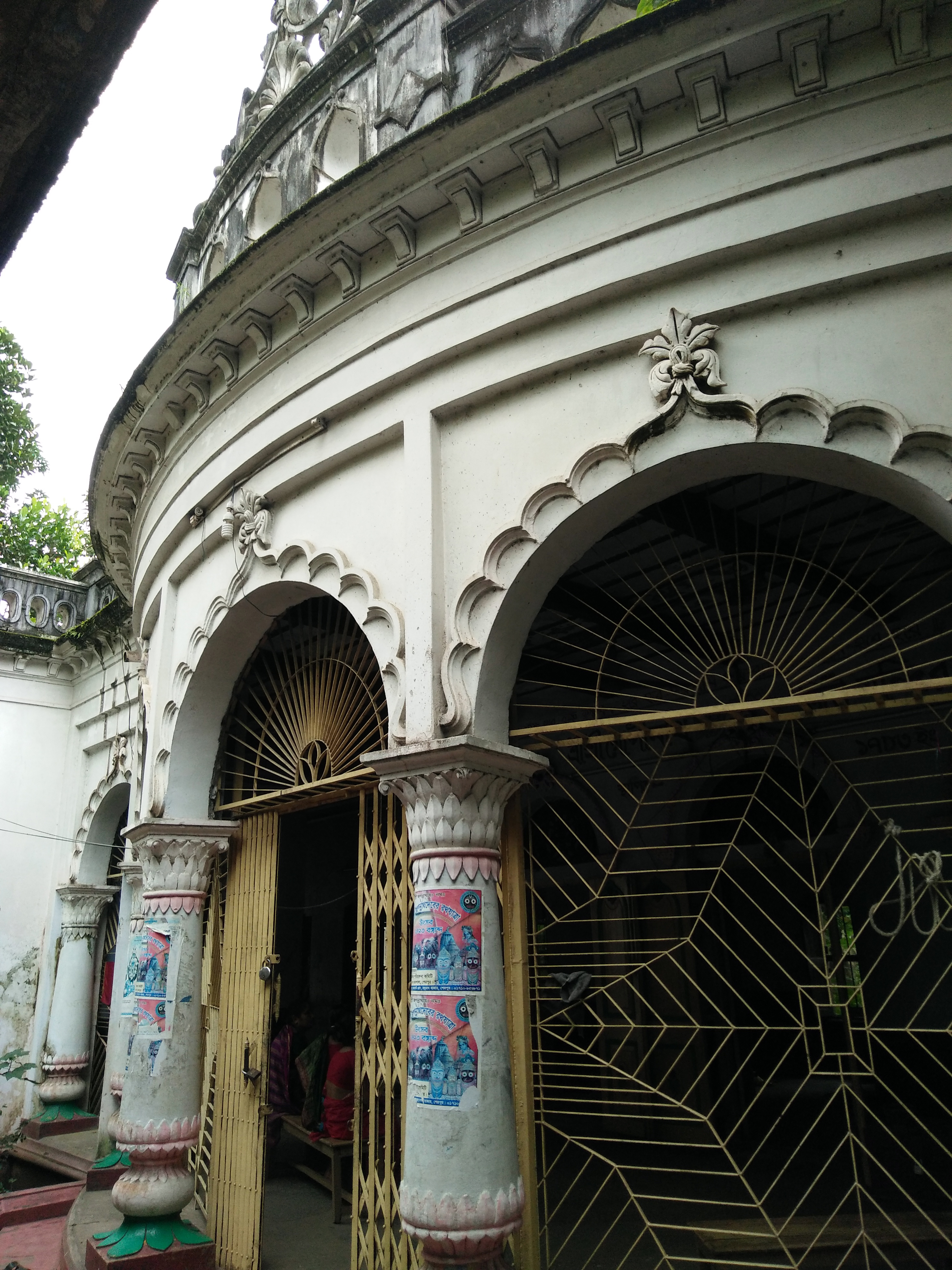

== See also ==
- List of archaeological sites in Bangladesh
