= SONNE – International =

Education development aid organization

SONNE-International
- Founded: 2002
- Founder: Erfried Malle, Susanne Prügger
- Type: Development aid organization; non-profit
- Purpose: Income generation through educational and training projects
- Location: Vienna, Austria
- Region served: Ethiopia, Bangladesch, India, Myanmar
- Method: Setting up and/or promoting and supporting local educational projects, primary health care programmes and self-help projects
- Website: sonne-international.org

SONNE-International (support organization for non-formal needed education) is a development aid organization that initiates, operates and / or supports educational programs as well as health care and rural development projects in Africa and Asia. The main focus is on education and training for disadvantaged children and adolescents.

The organization was founded in 2002 by Austrian doctor Dr. Susanne Prügger and the current chairman, Erfried Malle. Since 2006 SONNE-International has regularly been awarded the Österreichisches Spendengütesiegel (Austrian seal of approval for charities), since 2009 donations made to the organization are tax-deductible in Austria and Germany.

Among other projects, SONNE-International currently (2021) operates 23 schools, three student hostels, 4 day care centers and several skills training centers for adolescents where approximately 3,000 students are continually educated, respectively trained.

Altogether, approximately 150,000 people have access to basic medical care thanks to SONNE-International's projects (medical emergency clinics and mobile medical teams).

Income generation, the advancement of women and emergency support are further key aspects of the organization's activities.

== Mission statement ==
SONNE-International's activities are geared to promoting a world in which all people have adequate access to education, training, clean water, healthy food, medical care and income. With this approach, the organization aims to reduce poverty and sustainably improve the living conditions of disadvantaged people in order to give them the chance to lead self-determined lives.

== History ==
In 2002 Erfried Malle and Dr. Susanne Prügger put their vision of helping destitute people in the slums of Bangladesh into practice by founding the development organization SONNE-International in Vienna. Since the very beginning, the main objective has been to promote sustainable and self-contained development in close co-operation with the local population. The first project was the setting up of a health care center in a slum in Dhaka. In 2003 a job training center for adolescents was opened in Dhaka and another year later 10 village schools in remote areas of Bangladesh were built. In the following years the organization extended its activities to Ethiopia, Myanmar and India. The organization has been registered as an International NGO in Bangladesh (under the name of SONNE-International Austria-Bangladesh Branch) since 2009, and as an autonomous local NGO (Non-Governmental Organization) in Myanmar (under the name of SONNE Social Organization [SSO]) since 2015.

== Strategy and methods ==
SONNE-International's integral approach is intended to give as many disadvantaged persons as possible the chance to lead self-determined lives, mainly through education and training. The principal objective is to set up and/or strengthen local structures in the long term. All projects are planned and conducted in close co-operation with local partners in the respective project countries to generate long-lasting structures and thus sustainable improvements of people's living conditions.

== Programmatic core areas ==
1. Literacy and education: literacy and access to education for all children at all levels, adult education, sponsorship for school children and students. Skills and vocational training
2. Creation of income: skills training, computer training, basic economics / selling / bookkeeping, establishment of cooperatives, micro credits.
3. Improvement of the living conditions: health projects, water supply / sanitation, basic services, disaster relief.
4. Awareness: advancement of women and promotion of democracy, hygiene and health awareness, educational counselling, fight against female genital mutilation (FGM).

== SONNE projects worldwide ==
=== Ethiopia ===
The organization has been running projects in the Afar region since 2005, in close collaboration with the local partner organization Afar Pastoralist Development Association (APDA), whose primary target group are the semi-nomadic stockbreeders (pastoralists) of the Afar ethnic group.

The projects focus on education (mobile literacy, informal schooling and further education for gifted pupils), health (basic medical care, help for expectant mothers), awareness raising (hygiene, female genital mutilation etc.) and water supply (water storage tanks, well digging). The project areas are located in zones 3 and 4 of Afar Region, in the districts (Woredas) Gawaani, Gelaalu, Uwwa, Awra and Chifra.

=== Bangladesh ===
Since SONNE-International's foundation in the year 2002, Bangladesh has been one of the organization's focus countries. SONNE-International Austria - Bangladesh Branch is registered as an international NGO. It has more than 80 employees. Its Headquarters in the capital Dhaka is responsible for the implementation of all local projects.

The three project areas are situated in the Chittagong Hill Tracts (CHT), in the Sherpur District (Jhenaigati) and in Cox's Bazar District (Kutupalong). The target groups are children and adolescents from ethnic minorities, refugees and other disadvantaged population groups.

SONNE-International operates 19 small village schools (11 in the CHT, 8 in the Sherpur Region) and two secondary schools for children who live in remote locations and had no possibility of going to school before.

In Alikadam (CHT), Jhenaigati and Dhaka SONNE-International runs student hostels where approximately 50 girls and boys have the possibility to continue their education. The sponsorship program gives particularly talented students the chance to obtain a university degree. At both locations (Alikadam and Jhenaigati) skills training centers offer marginalized adolescents (particularly girls) the possibility to acquire professional qualifications in tailoring, weaving and computer skills.

=== India ===
In 1999 Austrian doctor Fridolin Stögermayer initiated a school project in Bihar State in co-operation with the local organization Buddha Educational Foundation Society. In 2012 the project was officially handed over to SONNE-International. Since then, it has been considerably extended. It comprises three schools at which approximately 350 students are currently being educated. Attending the schools is free of charge, uniforms and books are provided and, if necessary, the children receive medical care. They are between 5 and 14 years of age and come from very poor families of the lowest Indian caste – the Dalits. Without this project, most of them would have no access to education.

Another means of motivating and positively influencing the children is sports, in particular the (hugely popular) self-defence courses for girls (karate), which are of particular importance as girls, especially those from lower castes, are frequently subjected to sexual harassment.

=== Myanmar ===
In 2008 the organization started implementing projects with a local team and in 2015 SONNE-Social Organization (SSO) was officially established as a local NGO in Myanmar. The projects, which focus on education, training, medical care and the integration of ethnic minorities and other marginalized groups, are located in disadvantaged areas of Yangon and its surroundings.

SONNE-International operates three day care centers and (since 2019) a support center for marginalized children, where they receive a free daily meal and medical care as well as a wide range of support, care and training.

Destitute adolescents are given the chance to complete a vocational training in the fields of tailoring, basket weaving or computer skills in one of the organization's training facilities.

Thanks to an emergency medical fund all beneficiary children and adolescents profit from basic medical care.

== Finances/funding ==
SONNE-International is an independent organization that is financed by co-operations with private corporations and firms, foundations, public sponsors, governmental organizations and bodies, sponsorship schemes, membership fees and private donations. Donations made to SONNE-International are tax-deductible in Austria and Germany (since 2009).

== Awards ==
Wirtschaft hilft! [Economy helps!] Award 2018

SONNE-International and MEDIACOM (Austria) were awarded first prize for their entreprise-NGO partnership concerning an educational project in Ethiopia, in the category of Small and Intermediate Enterprises.

Austrian of the year 2011

In 2011 chairman Erfried Malle was elected Austrian of the year at the ORF press gala Austria '11 in recognition of his humanitarian engagement.

Woman Award 2010

In 2010 Dr. Susanne Prügger, co-founder of the organization, was awarded the Woman Award in the category social engagement by the Austrian magazine WOMAN

Austrian Seal of Approval for Charities

Since 2006 SONNE-International has regularly been awarded the "Österreichisches Spendengütesiegel".

NGO of the year 2005

In 2005 SONNE-International came third in the election of "NGO of the year 2005" organized by Glocalist.
