= Sreebardi Upazila =

Sreebardi শ্রীবরদী
- Upazila
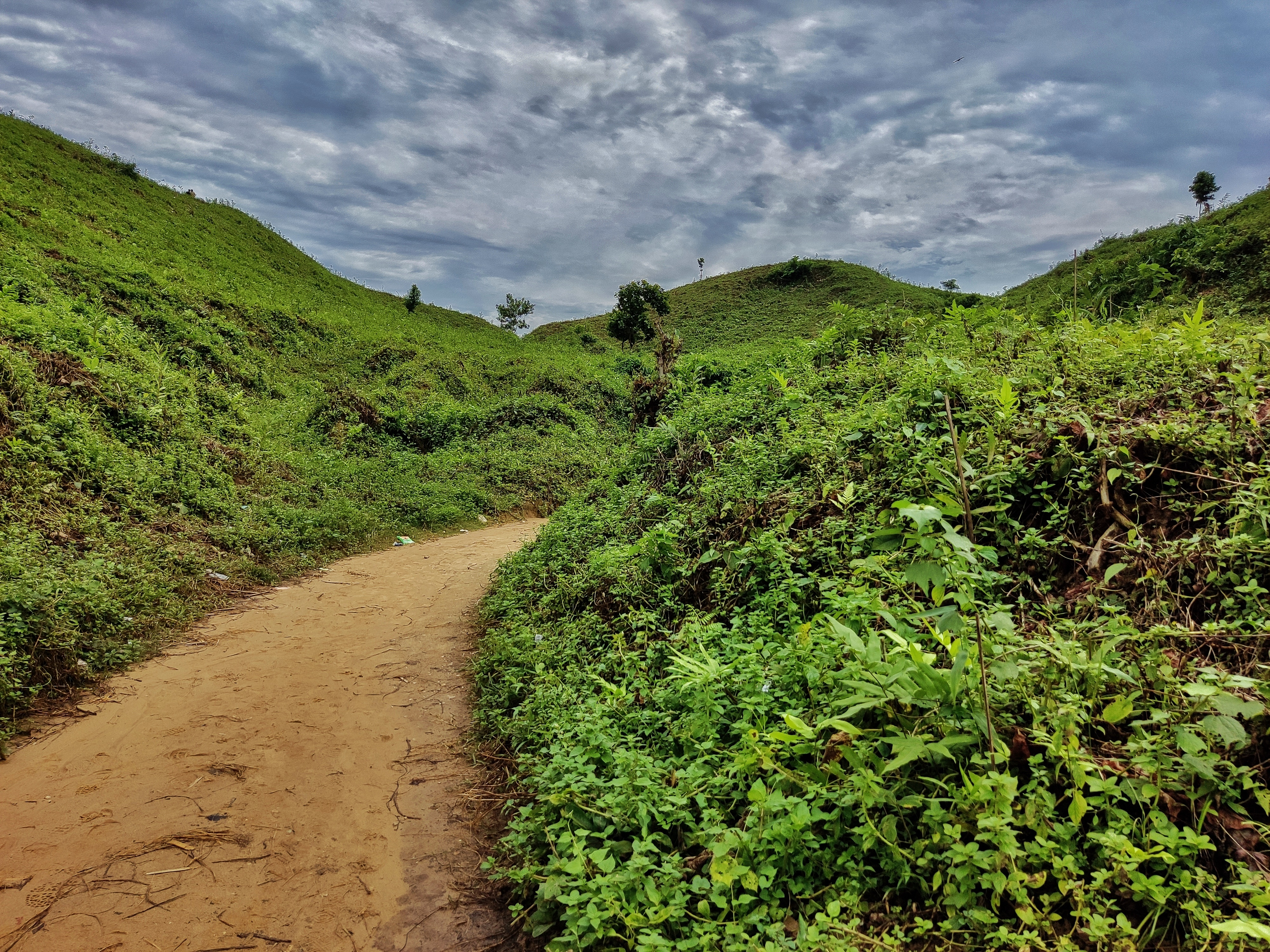
- Hills in Sreebardi upazila

- Coordinates: 25°9′N 89°54.2′E
- Country: Bangladesh
- Division: Mymensingh Division
- District: Sherpur District

Area
  - Total: 248.25 km^{2} (95.85 sq mi)

Population (2022)
  - Total: 279,142
  - Density: 1,124.4/km^{2} (2,912.3/sq mi)
- Time zone: UTC+6 (BST)
- Postal code: 2130
- Website: sreebordi.sherpur.gov.bd

Sreebardi Upazila mauza geocode map

Sreebardi (Bengali: শ্রীবরদী) is an upazila of Sherpur District in the Division of Mymensingh, Bangladesh.

== Geography ==
Sreebardi is located at 25.1500°N 89.9028°E. It has 65,892 households and total area 248.25 km^{2}. It is bounded by Meghalaya state of India on the north, Sherpur sadar upazila on the south, Jhenaigati upazila on the east, Bakshiganj and Islampur upazila on the west.

== Demographics ==
Historical population
Year	Pop.	±%
1981	232,945	—
1991	228,194	−2.0%
2001	242,320	+6.2%
2011	259,648	+7.2%
2022	279,142	+7.5%
Source: Bangladesh Bureau of Statistics

Religions in Sreebardi Upazila (2022)
Religion	Percent
Islam	98.32%
Hinduism	1.25%
Christianity	0.41%
Other or not stated	0.02%

According to the 2022 Bangladeshi census, Sreebardi Upazila had 74,352 households and a population of 279,142. 10.21% of the population were under 5 years of age. Sreebardi had a literacy rate (age 7 and over) of 61.03%: 63.65% for males and 58.59% for females, and a sex ratio of 94.21 males for 100 females. 42,609 (16.88%) lived in urban areas. The ethnic population is 1,484 (0.53%), of which 1,100 were Garo.

== Administration ==
Sreebardi Thana, now an upazila, was formed on 31 March 1918. Sreebardi Municipality was formed in 24 September 2004.

The Upazila is divided into Sreebardi Municipality and ten union parishads: Bhelua, Garjaripa, Gosaipur, Kakilakura, Kharia Kazirchar, Kurikahonia, Ranishimul, Singabaruna, Sreebordi, and Tatihati. The union parishads are subdivided into 81 mauzas and 142 villages.

Sreebardi Municipality is subdivided into 9 wards and 20 mahallas.

== Notable people ==
- Majlis Khan Humayun, governor of Garh-Jaripa

== See also ==
- Upazilas of Bangladesh
- Districts of Bangladesh
- Divisions of Bangladesh
