= Madhutila Eco Park =

Forest and ecological park in Sherpur, Bangladesh

Coordinates: 25.2059°N 90.1532°E

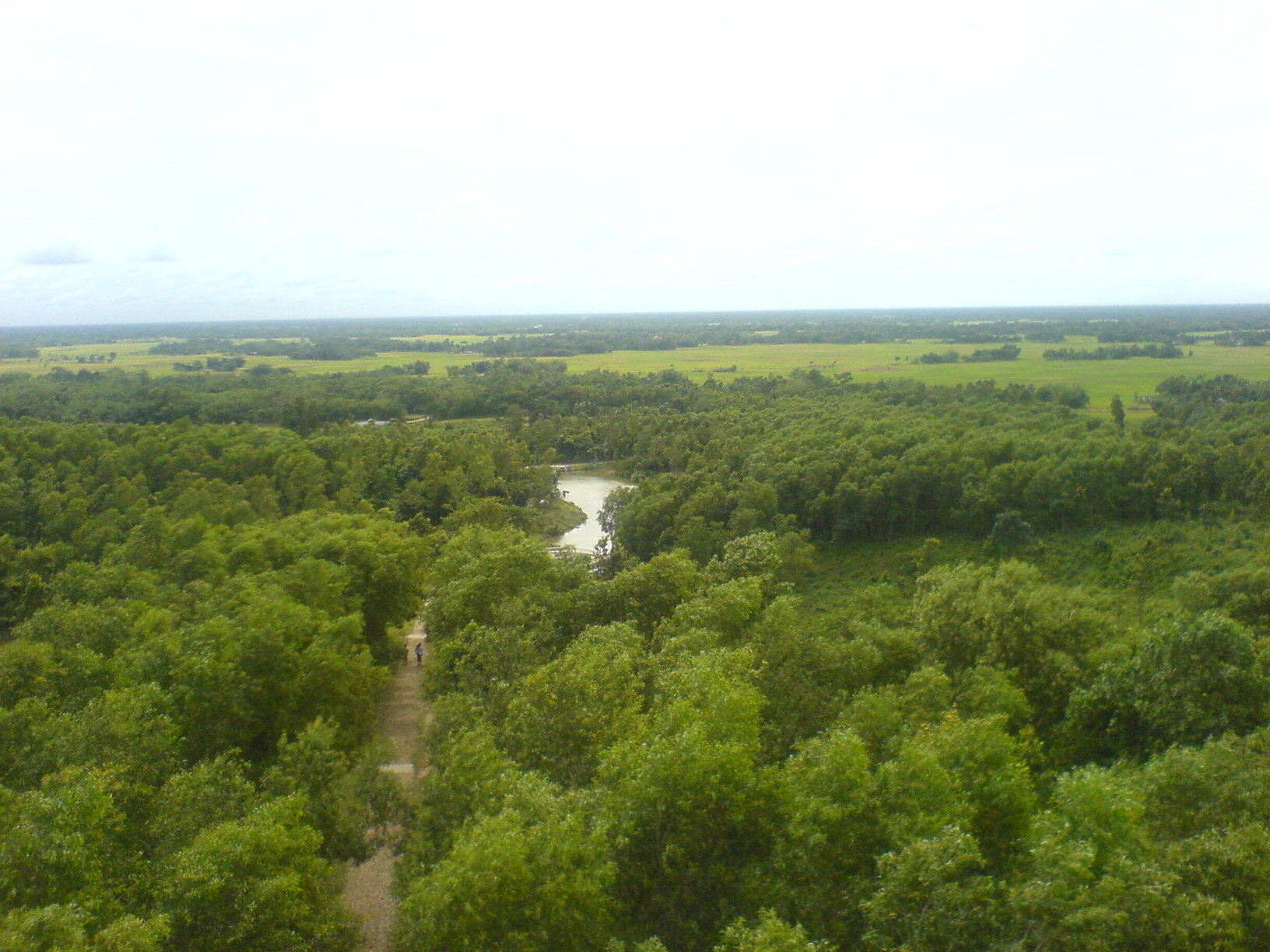
Madhutila Eco Park

Madhutila Eco Park (Bengali: মধুটিলা; Madhutila) is deep green forest and eco park in Sherpur District.

== Location ==
Madhutila Eco Park is in Puragaon Union under the Madhutila Forest Range in Nalitabari Upazila of Sherpur district of Bangladesh in 1999. It is 380 acres. It falls close to the Bangladesh-India border.

== Areas ==
Madhutila Eco Park include region Mymensingh, Sherpur, Jamalpur, Tangail, Netrokona and Kishoreganj districts.
