= Nalitabari Upazila =

Nalitabari নালিতাবাড়ী
- Upazila
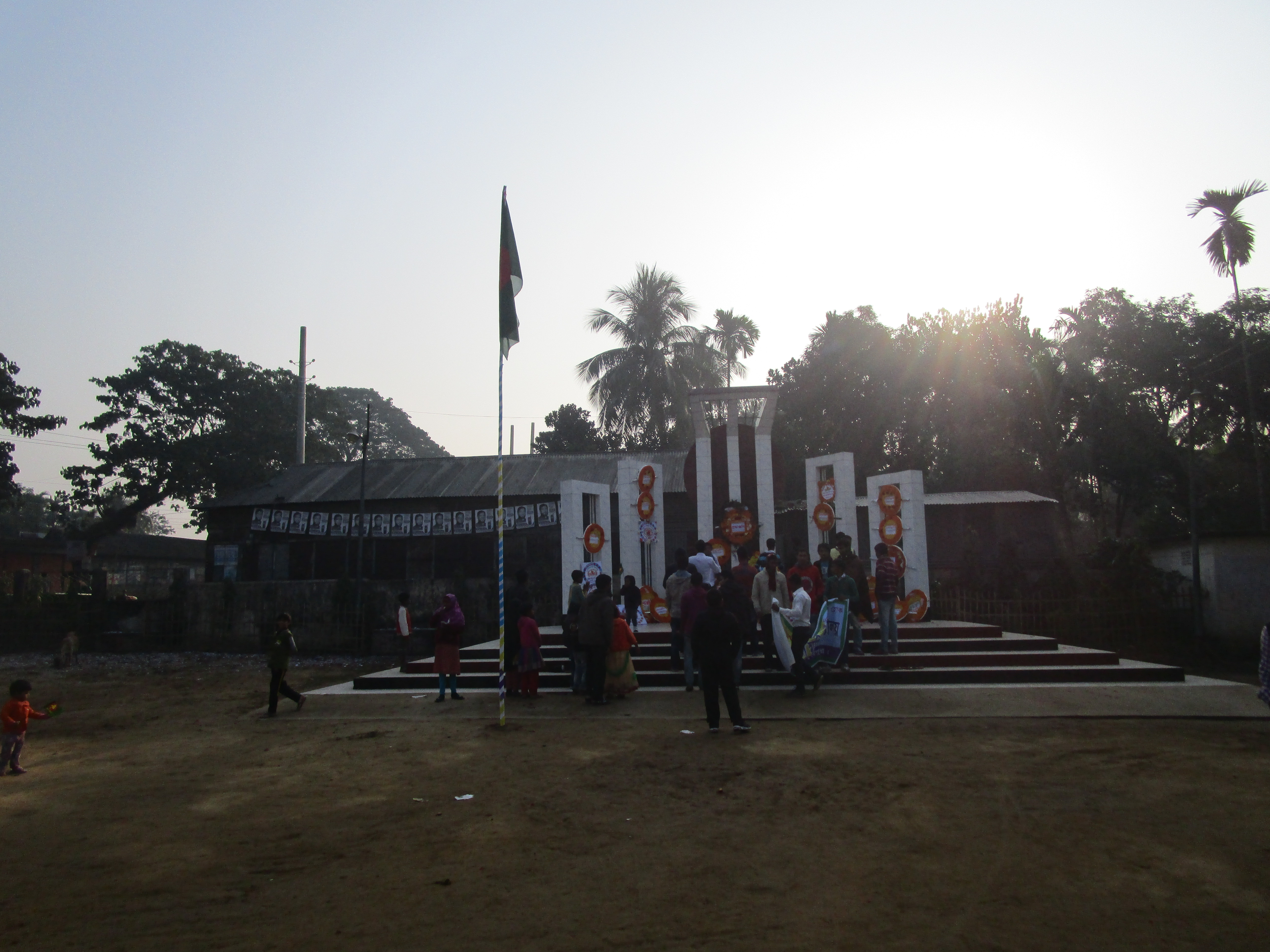
- Nalitabari Shahid Minar

- Country: Bangladesh
- Division: Mymensingh Division
- District: Sherpur District

Area
  - Total: 327.60 km^{2} (126.49 sq mi)

Population (2022)
  - Total: 271,933
  - Density: 830.08/km^{2} (2,149.9/sq mi)
- Time zone: UTC+6 (BST)
- Postal code: 2110 (Latifpur)
- Postal code: 2111 (Hatibandha)
- Area code: 0931
- Website: nalitabari.sherpur.gov.bd

Nalitabari (Bengali: নালিতাবাড়ি) is an upazila of Sherpur District in the Division of Mymensingh, Bangladesh.

== Geography ==
Nalitabari is located at 25.0833°N 90.1954°E. It has 64,805 households and a total area of 327.60 km^{2}. It is bounded by the Meghalaya state of India on the north, the Sherpur Sadar and Nakla upazilas on the south, the Haluaghat Upazila of Mymensingh District on the east, and the Jhenaigati upazila on the west.

Taragonj bajar is the main populated place in the upazila. Quality hotels and shops are also found here.

== Demographics ==
Religions in Nalitabari Upazila (2022)
Religion	Percent
Islam	96.45%
Hinduism	2.13%
Christianity	1.27%
Other or not stated	0.15%

According to the 2022 Bangladeshi census, Nalitabari Upazila had 73,488 households and a population of 271,933. 10.52% of the population were under 5 years of age. Nalitabari had a literacy rate (age 7 and over) of 65.75%: 67.37% for males and 64.23% for females, and a sex ratio of 94.63 males for 100 females. 43,970 (16.17%) lived in urban areas. The ethnic population was 4,432 (1.63%).

Population of Nalitabari upazila by ethnicity (2022)
1. Bengali (98.4%)
2. Garo (0.92%)
3. Others (0.71%)

Nalitabari Upazila mauza geocode map

== Administration ==
Nalitabari, primarily formed as a Thana, was turned into an upazila in 1983.

Nalitabari Upazila is divided into Nalitabari Municipality and 12 union parishads: Bagber, Juganiya, Kakorkandhi, Koloshpar, Morichpuran, Nalitabari, Nayabil, Nonni, Puragau, Rajnogor, Ramchondrokura, and Rupnarayankura. The union parishads are subdivided into 108 mauzas and 140 villages.

Nalitabari Municipality is subdivided into 9 wards and 17 mahallas.

== See also ==
- Upazilas of Bangladesh
- Districts of Bangladesh
- Divisions of Bangladesh
