= Sherpur, Bangladesh =

Town in Mymensingh Division

Sherpur শেরপুর
- Town
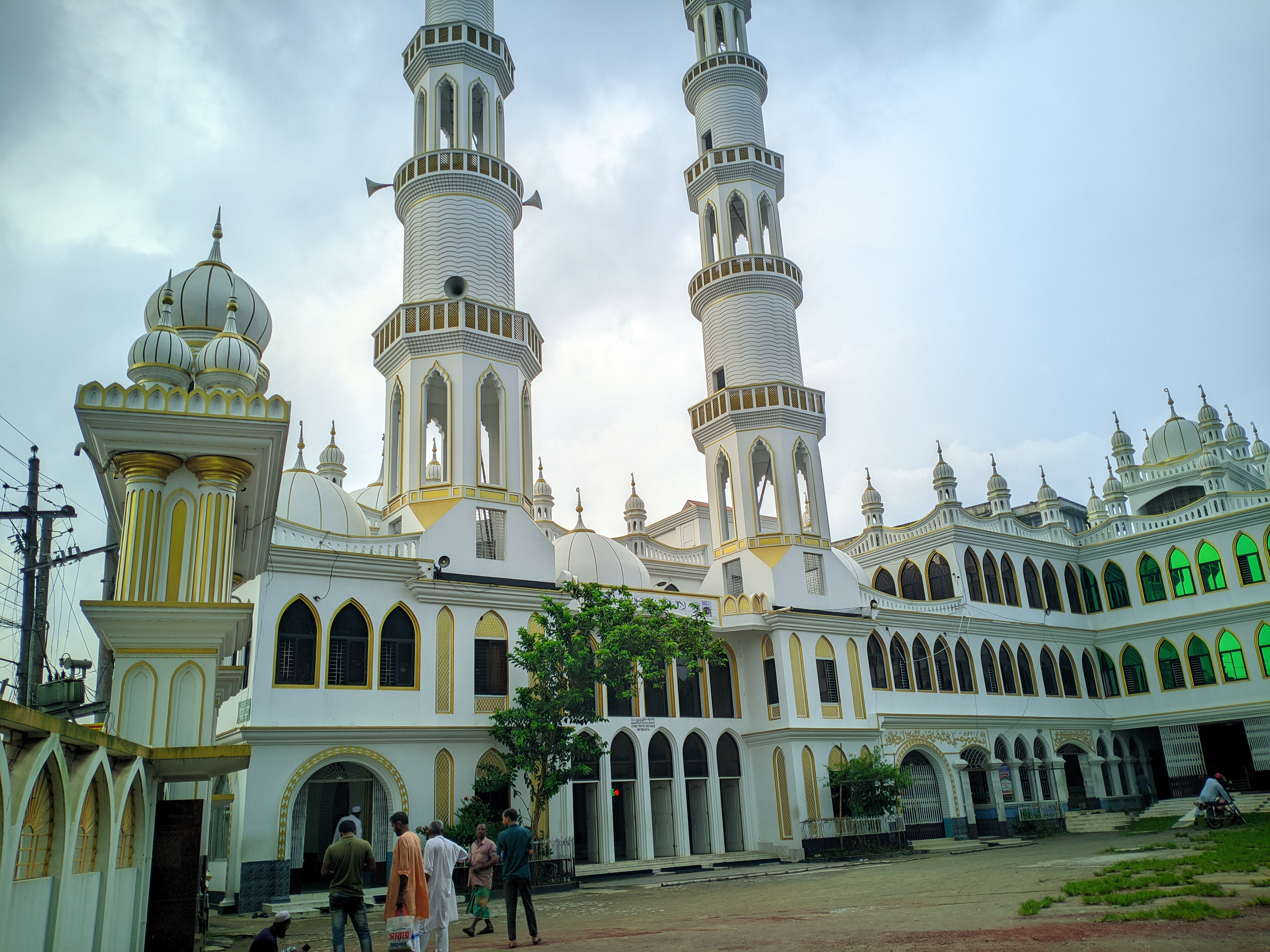
- Mai Saheba Jame Masjid

- Location of Sherpur in Myemsingh division Location of Sherpur in Bangladesh
- Coordinates: 25.021°N 90.010°E
- Country: Bangladesh
- Division: Mymensingh
- District: Sherpur
- Upazila: Sherpur Sadar

Government
  - Type: Paurashava
  - Body: Sherpur Paurashava

Population (2022)
  - Total: 123,513
- Time zone: UTC+6 (BST)

Sherpur is a city in northern Bangladesh. It is the headquarters of Sherpur district of Mymensingh Division.

== Demographics ==
Religions in Sherpur Paurashava (2022)
| Religion | Percent |
| Islam | 91.44% |
| Hinduism | 8.40% |
| Other or not stated | 0.16% |

According to the 2022 Bangladesh census, Sherpur Paurashava had 30,681 households and a population of 123,516. Sherpur had a literacy rate of 79.21%: 81.24% for males and 77.18% for females, and a sex ratio of 99.65 males per 100 females. 8.49% of the population was under 5 years of age.

According to the 2011 Bangladesh census, Sherpur city had 22,665 households and a population of 97,979. 20,734 (21.16%) were under 10 years of age. Sherpur had a literacy rate (age 7 and over) of 56.19%, compared to the national average of 51.8%, and a sex ratio of 975 females per 1000 males. Ethnic population was 591 (0.60%).
