= Nakla Upazila =

Nakla Upazila নকলা
- Upazila
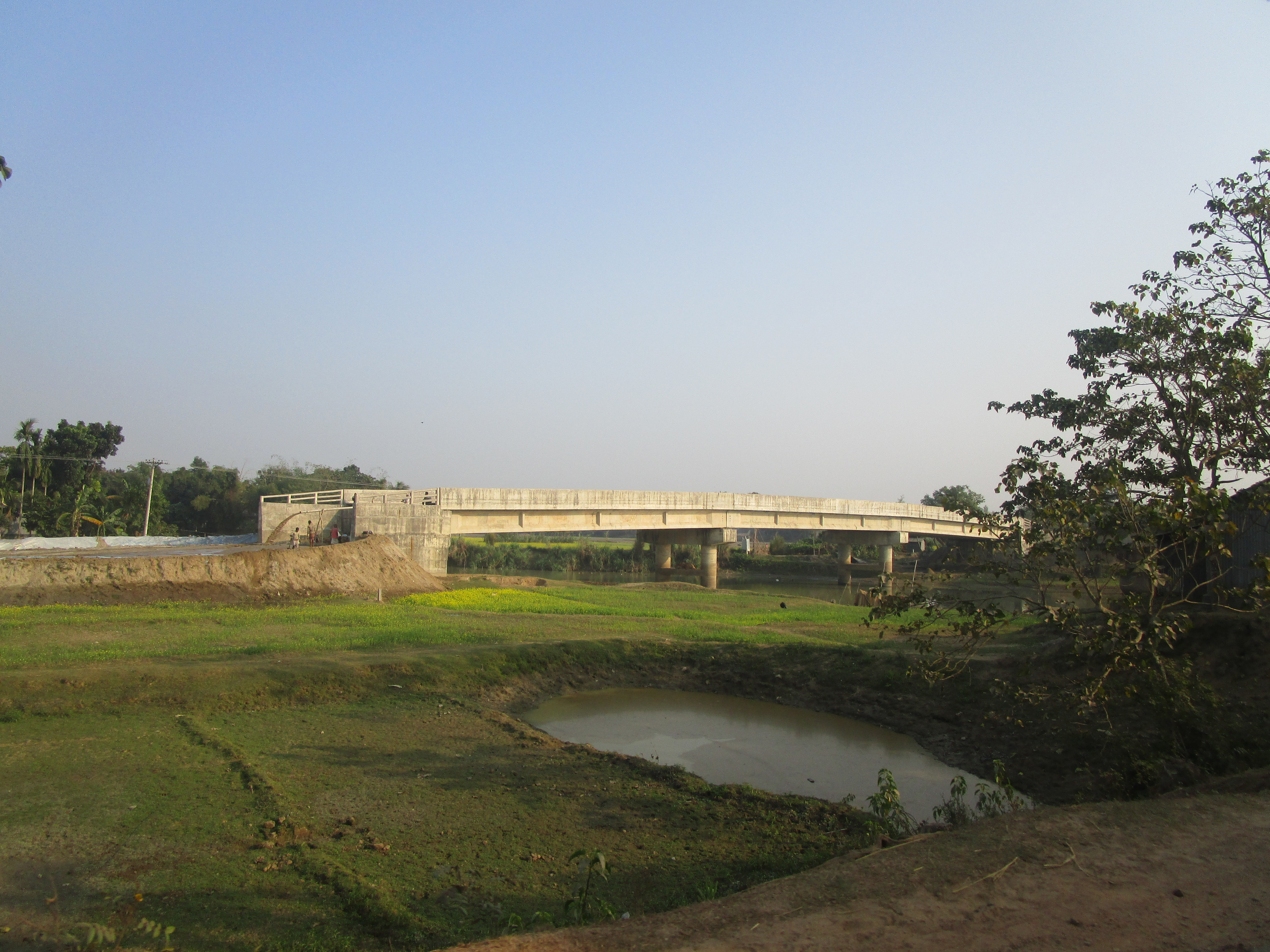
- Vaitkamari Khal

- Coordinates: 24°59′N 90°11′E
- Country: Bangladesh
- Division: Mymensingh
- District: Sherpur

Government
  - UNO: Zahidur Rahman

Area
  - Total: 173.84 km^{2} (67.12 sq mi)

Population (2022)
  - Total: 208,765
  - Density: 1,200.9/km^{2} (3,110.3/sq mi)
- Time zone: UTC+6 (BST)
- Postal code: 2150
- Area code: 0931
- Website: nokla.sherpur.gov.bd

Nakla Upazila mauza geocode map

Nakla (Bengali: নকলা) is an upazila of Sherpur District in the Division of Mymensingh, Bangladesh.

== Geography ==
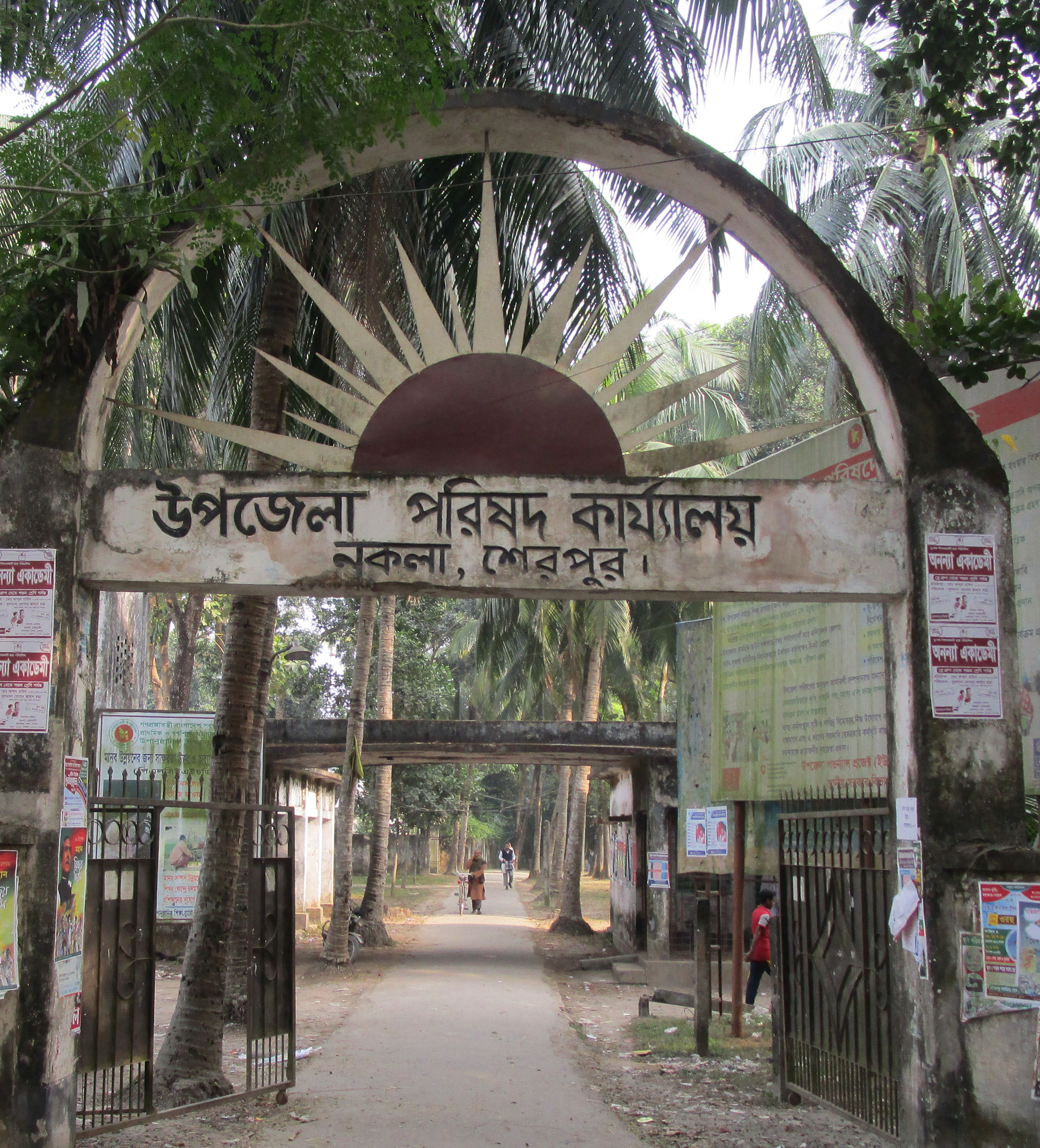
Nakla upazila parishad gate

Nakla is located at 24.9833°N 90.1833°E. It had 33,482 units of household and total area 174.8 km^{2}.

Nakla was freed from Pakistani military on 9 December 1971. Pakistani military forces surrendered in the village named Pathakata. It is a historical place for Nakla. Every day many of tourists who are interested in its liberation war come to see the place. Nowadays there is a market named Pathakata Baazar.

== Demographics ==
Historical population
Year	Pop.	±%
1981	133,880	—
1991	162,952	+21.7%
2001	179,422	+10.1%
2011	189,685	+5.7%
2022	208,765	+10.1%
Source: Bangladesh Bureau of Statistics

Religions in Nakla Upazila (2022)
Religion	Percent
Islam	98.13%
Hinduism	1.86%
Other or not stated	0.01%

According to the 2022 Bangladeshi census, Nakla Upazila had 54,025 households and a population of 208,765. 10.10% of the population were under 5 years of age. Nakla had a literacy rate (age 7 and over) of 63.11%: 64.66% for males and 61.71% for females, and a sex ratio of 92.15 males for 100 females. 62,201 (29.79%) lived in urban areas.

== Administration ==
Nakla Thana, now an upazila, was formed in 1930.

Nakla Upazila is divided into Nakla Municipality and nine union parishads: Baneshwardi, Chandrakona, Char Ashtadhar, Ganapaddi, Kursa Badagair, Nakla, Pathakata, Talki, and Urpha. The union parishads are subdivided into 88 mauzas and 108 villages.

Nakla Municipality is subdivided into 9 wards and 16 mahallas.

== See also ==
- Upazilas of Bangladesh
- Districts of Bangladesh
- Divisions of Bangladesh
