= Sherpur District =

Sherpur District শেরপুর জেলা
- District of Bangladesh
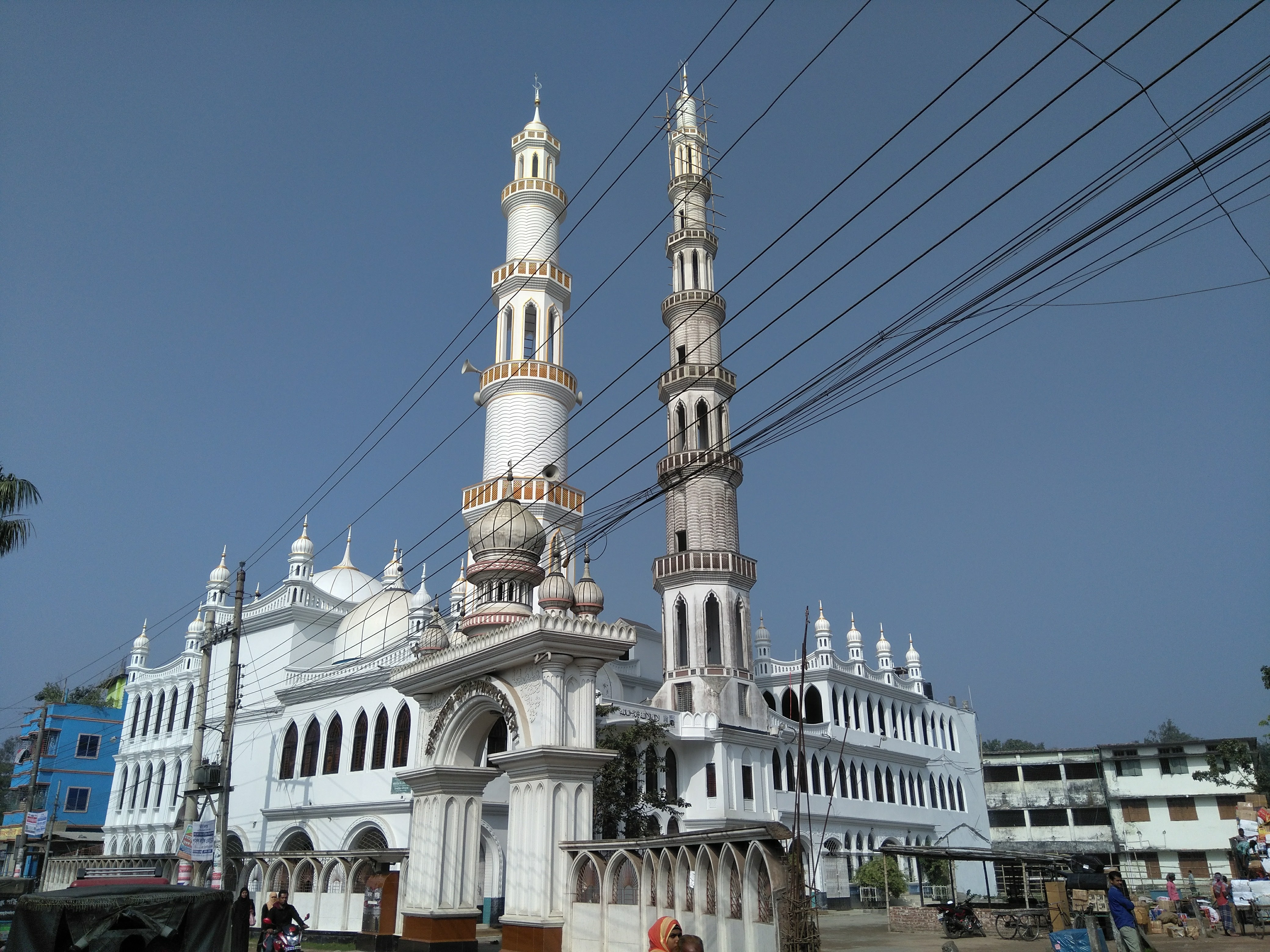
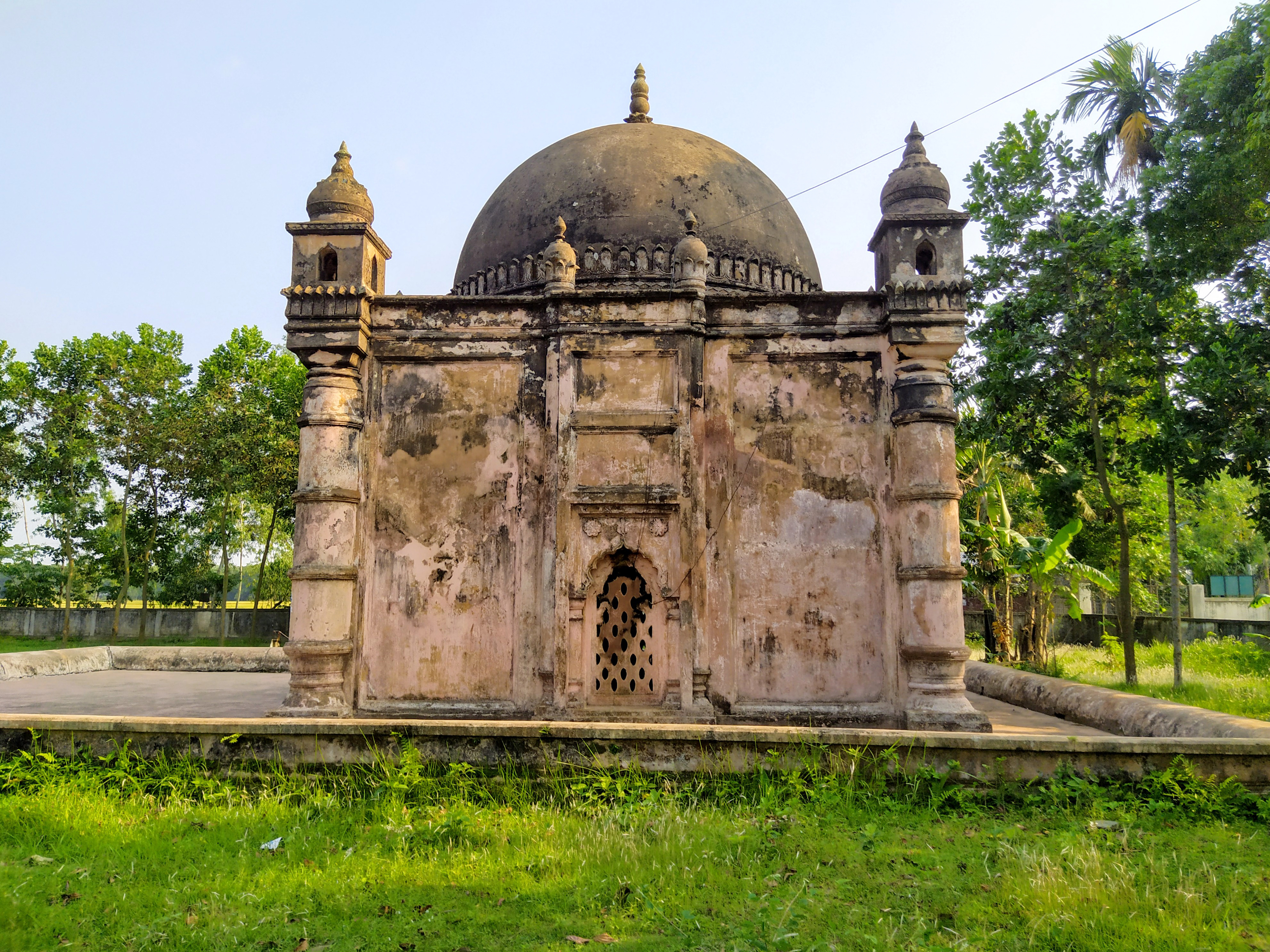
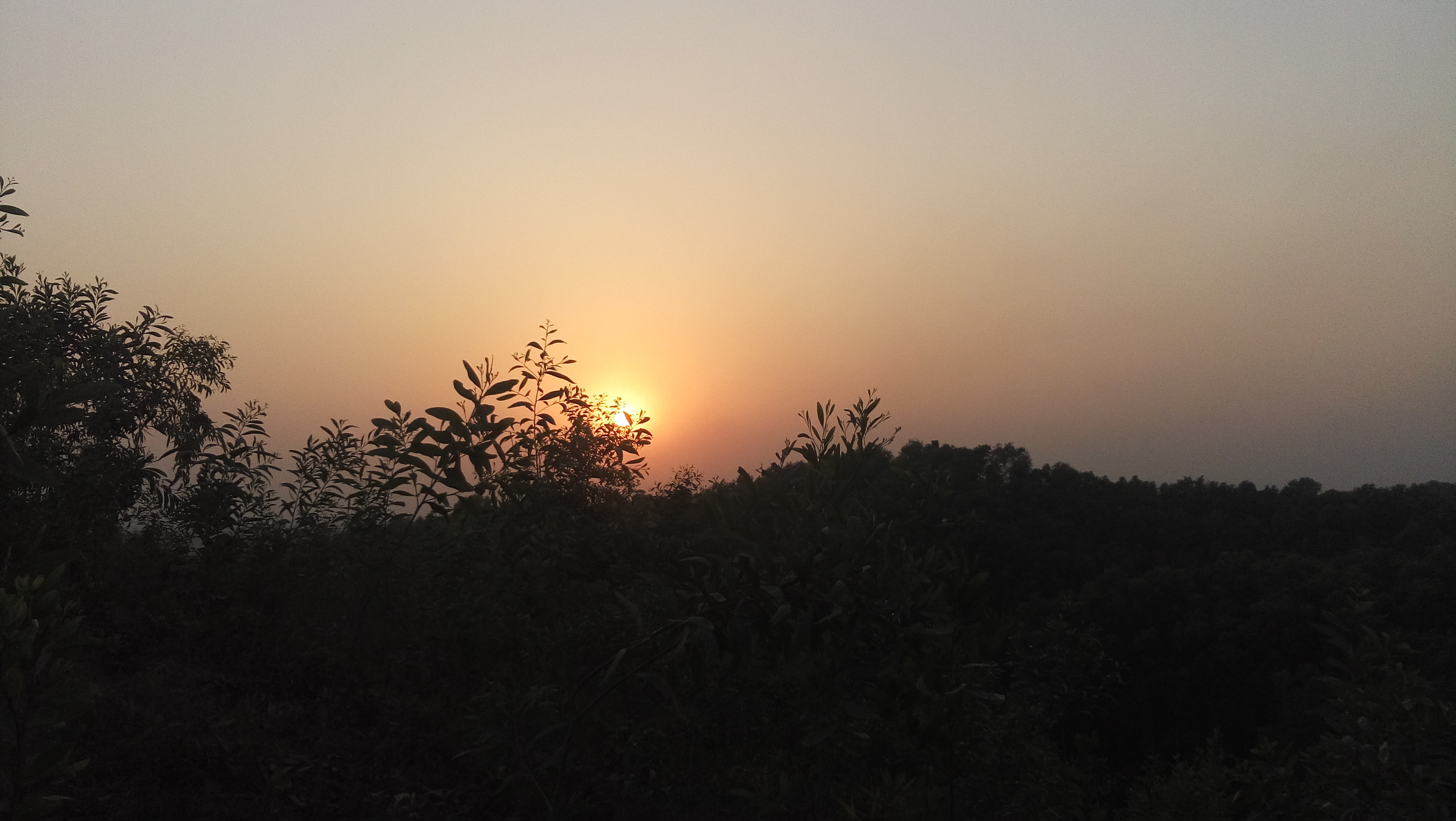
- Clockwise from top-left: Mysaheba Jame Masque in Sherpur, Madhutila Eco Park, Ghagra Khan Bari Jami Mosque

- Location of Sherpur District in Bangladesh
- Expandable map of Sherpur District
- Coordinates: 25.00°N 90.00°E
- Country: Bangladesh
- Division: Mymensingh Division
- Established: 12 February 1984
- Headquarters: Sherpur

Government
  - Zila Chairman: Md. Humayun Kabir Ruman (Awami League)
  - Deputy Commissioner: Torfadar Mahmudur Rahman

Area
  - Total: 1,364.67 km^{2} (526.90 sq mi)

Population (2022)
  - Total: 1,501,853
  - Density: 1,100.52/km^{2} (2,850.35/sq mi)
- Demonym: Sherpuri
- Time zone: UTC+06:00 (BST)
- Postal code: 2100
- Area code: 0931
- ISO 3166 code: BD-57
- HDI (2018): 0.574 medium · 18th of 21
- Website: sherpur.gov.bd

Sherpur District (Bengali: শেরপুর জেলা) is a district in northern Bangladesh. It is a part of Mymensingh Division. Sherpur District was a sub-division of Jamalpur District before 1984. It was upgraded to a district on February 22, 1984 under Hussain Muhammad Ershad's decentralization programme. Sherpur is located about 197–199 kilometres (122–124 mi) north of Dhaka, the capital of Bangladesh.

== Etymology ==
The name "Sherpur" cannot be found in ancient history. In ancient times, Sherpur was called Garh Jaripa. During the rule of the Mughal emperor Akbar, this area was called Dash Kahonia Baju (At present Daskahonia named a village under 2 no Charsherpur union). The previous name of Old Brahmaputra river in this area was Louhitto Sagar which was situated in a vast area from the south border of Sherpur municipality to Jamalpur Ghat. The people of this area had to pay 10 kahon coins to the leaseholders as an annual tax for travelling in the river. "Dash" means ten and "Kahon" is a unit of measure for counting which means 128 pieces. From this event, this area was called as "Dash Kahonia".

During the Nawabi period in Bangal, the last landlord of Gazi clan, Sher Ali Gazi occupied and reigned this area independently. From then, the name of this area was changed from "Dash Kahonia" to Sherpur according to the name of the ruler, Sher Ali Gazi.

== History ==
Sherpur region was on the southwest frontier of the kingdom of the Kamarupa in the ancient time. It was known as Garh-Dalipa after its ruler, the Hindu Koch king Raja Dalip Samant. In 1491, the Sultan of Bengal Saifuddin Firuz Shah despatched an army led by Majlis Khan Humayun which crossed the Brahmaputra River and conquered Garh-Dalipa, defeating Raja Dalip and extending Muslim rule into the northern reaches of greater Mymensingh. Following the conquest, Garh-Dalipa was renamed Garh-Jaripa, reportedly after a local Muslim saint, Sufi Jarip (Zarif) Shah, whose presence influenced Humayun's decision to honor him in the renaming. The region was then occupied by the Gazi landlords during Mughal period. The Fakir-Sannyasi Revolts were held against the East India Company and the local zamindars from the time of Warren Hastings to Lord Cornwallis. Tipu Shah, leader of the Pagalpanthi Movement, declared sovereignty in the area and established his capital at Gajaripa. Peasant conferences were held in 1906, 1914 and 1917 at Kamarer Char of Sherpur under the leadership of Khos Muhammad Chowdhury. The communists revolted against the systems of Nankar, Tonk, Bhawali, Mahajani, Ijaradari during 1838–48 in Sherpur. In 1897, a devastating earthquake changed the main flow of the Brahmaputra to go to the Jamuna and severely reduced the flow in the Old Brahmaputra. It also caused serious damage to many old buildings.

During the non-cooperation movement in 1971 declared by East Pakistani politicians, a war committee was formed in this district. Sherpur played an important role by training Mukti Bahini militants led by the war committee.

== Geography ==
Sherpur District covers an area of 1359.87 sq km, located in between 24°18' and 25°18' north latitudes and in between 89°53' and 90°91' east longitudes.

It is bounded on the north by India, on the east by Mymensingh district, on the south and west by Jamalpur district. The main rivers of Sherpur District are Brahmaputra, Kongsho and Vogai. Malijhi, Shomeshwari, Nitai, Maharoshi are some minor rivers located in this district. Ceramic soil is the main natural resource of this district. The annual average temperature of this district varies from maximum 33.3 °C to minimum 12 °C. The annual rainfall is 2174 mm.

== Administration ==
Sherpur District upazila geocode map

- Deputy Commissioner (DC): Tarafder Mahmudur Rahman
- Administrator of Zila Porishod: Tarafder Mahmudur Rahman
- Mayor of Sherpur Municipality: Golam Kibriya Liton

The district consists of 5 upazilas (sub-districts), 52 unions, 458 mauzas, 695 villages, 4 municipalities, 36 wards and 99 mahallas. The upazilas are:

Upazilas under Sherpur District
| Sub-district | Number of union | Area | Population 2022 |
|---|---|---|---|
| Sherpur Sadar Upazila | 14 | 356.12 | 563,817 |
| Nalitabari Upazila | 12 | 327.61 | 271,905 |
| Sreebardi Upazila | 10 | 270.34 | 279,139 |
| Jhenaigati Upazila | 7 | 231.00 | 178,137 |
| Nakla Upazila | 9 | 174.80 | 208,753 |

== Demographics ==
Historical population
| Year | Pop. | ±% p.a. |
|---|---|---|
| 1981 | 920,889 | — |
| 1991 | 1,138,629 | +2.15% |
| 2001 | 1,279,542 | +1.17% |
| 2011 | 1,358,325 | +0.60% |
| 2022 | 1,501,853 | +0.92% |

According to the 2022 Census of Bangladesh, Sherpur District had 396,149 households and a population of 1,501,853 million with an average 3.76 people per household. Among the population, 300,674 (20.01%) inhabitants were under 10 years of age. The population density was 1,100 people per km^{2}. Sherpur District had a literacy rate (age 7 and over) of 63.70%, compared to the national average of 74.80%, and a sex ratio of 1,050 females per 1,000 males. Approximately, 24.64% (370,099) of the population lived in urban areas. Ethnic population was 11,082 (0.74%), mainly Garo, Koch and Hajong.

Religion in Sherpur District (2022)
| Religion | Percent |
| Islam | 96.95% |
| Hinduism | 2.45% |
| Christianity | 0.55% |
| Other or not stated | 0.05% |

Religion in present-day Sherpur District
| Religion | 1941 (Note: 1941 figures refer to Nokla, Nalitabari, Sherpur and Sribardi thanas of Mymensingh district, which roughly correspond to the current district.) | | 1981 | | 1991 | | 2001 | | 2011 | | 2022 | |
| Religion | Pop. | % | Pop. | % | Pop. | % | Pop. | % | Pop. | % | Pop. | % |
|---|---|---|---|---|---|---|---|---|---|---|---|---|
| Islam | 357,895 | 79.47% | 878,611 | 95.41% | 1,087,494 | 95.51% | 1,234,834 | 96.51% | 1,313,519 | 96.70% | 1,456,087 | 96.95% |
| Hinduism | 80,569 | 17.89% | 31,257 | 3.39% | 34,529 | 3.03% | 34,112 | 2.67% | 34,944 | 2.57% | 36,827 | 2.45% |
| Tribal religion (Note: The 1941 census referred to the community of all members of Scheduled Tribes as 'tribal', irrespective of the actual religion practiced.) | 11,704 | 2.60% | —N/a | —N/a | —N/a | —N/a | —N/a | —N/a | —N/a | —N/a | —N/a | —N/a |
| Christianity | 190 | 0.04% | 9,075 | 0.99% | 10,483 | 0.92% | 9,314 | 0.73% | 8,668 | 0.64% | 8,315 | 0.55% |
| Others (Note: Including Jainism, Buddhism, Zoroastrianism, Judaism, Ad-Dharmis, or not stated) | 41 | 0.00% | 1,946 | 0.21% | 6,123 | 0.54% | 1,282 | 0.09% | 1,194 | 0.09% | 624 | 0.05% |
| Total population | 450,389 | 100% | 920,889 | 100% | 1,138,629 | 100% | 1,279,542 | 100% | 1,358,325 | 100% | 1,501,853 | 100% |

In 2011, Muslims were the largest population with 96.70%, while Hindus are the largest minority with 2.57%. There was a small minority of Christians, mostly Garo. In 2011 16,231 (1.19%) were from ethnic minorities, mainly Garo.

== Points of interest ==
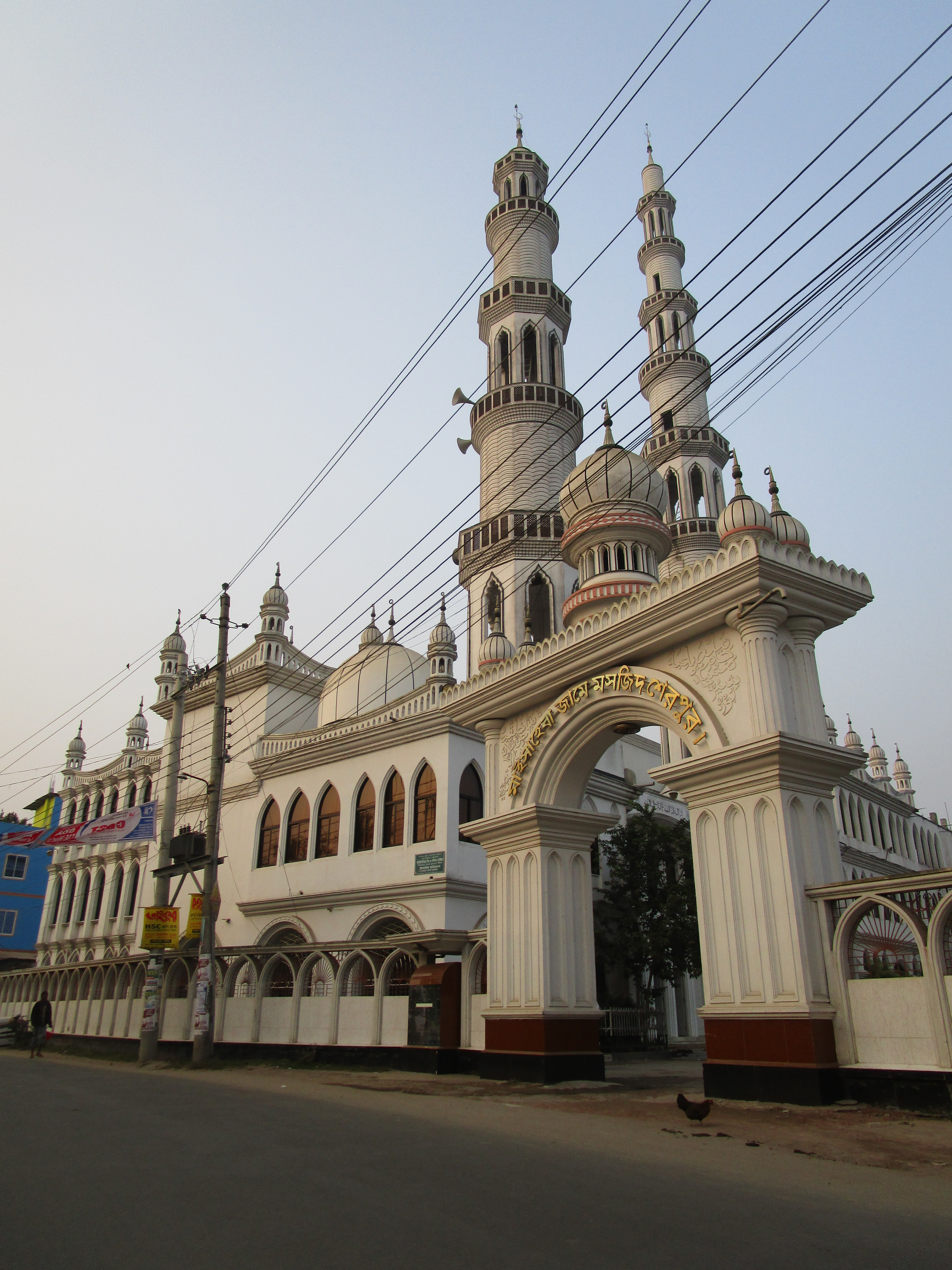
Mysaheba Jame Masque, Sherpur

Archaeological Heritage and Relics include: Gojni Obokash Kendra, Madhutila Ecopark in Nalitabari, Ghagra Laskar Bari Mosque (1808), Baraduari Mosque at Garhjaripar, Garh Jaripar Fort (1486-91AD), Tomb of Darvish Jarip Shah, Tomb of Shah Kamal (1644 AD), Tomb of Sher Ali Gazi, Mughal Mosque at Kasba, Maisaheba Mosque, and Residences of Nay Ani, Arai Ani and Pouney Tin Ani Zamindars.

== Member of the 12th parliament ==
| Name | Seat | Party |
|---|---|---|
| Rashedul Islam (politician) | Sherpur-1 | Bangladesh Jamaat-e-Islami |
| Mohammad Fahim Chowdori | Sherpur-2 | Bangladesh Nationalist Party |
| Mahmudul Haque Rubel | Sherpur-3 | Bangladesh Nationalist Party |

== Notable people ==
- Badrul Alam (1929–1980), medical physician and language activist
- Md. Atiur Rahman Atik (born 1957), politician
- Rakibul Atik (born 1999), cricketer
- Mohamed Atikuzzaman (born 1999), footballer
- Muhammad Abdul Bari, politician and businessman
- Monjurul Ahsan Bulbul (born 1959), journalist
- Chanuar Hossain Chanu (born 1966), politician
- Shah Rafiqul Bari Chowdhury, politician
- Zahed Ali Chowdhury (1947–2011), politician
- Syed Abdul Hai (died 1971), army officer
- Khondakar Abdul Hamid (1918–1983), journalist
- Haque family of Sreebardi
  - A. K. Muhammad Fazlul Haque (born 1949), politician
  - Dr. Serajul Haque (died 1994), medical doctor, politician and physician
  - Mahmudul Haque Rubel, politician
- Majlis Khan Humayun, first Muslim governor of Garjaripa
- Nazrul Islam, parliamentarian
- Muhammad Kamaruzzaman (1952–2015), executed journalist
- Khandakar Mohammad Khurram (1953–2018), politician
- Mahamudul Hasan Kiron (born 2001), footballer
- Abdus Salam (1942–2011), teacher and politician
- Shah family of Letarkanda
  - Karim Shah (died 1813), founder of the Pagal Panthis
  - Tipu Shah (died 1851), second leader of the Pagal Panthis
- Syed Abdus Sultan (1917–1991), politician, lawyer, orator and author
- Fatema Tuzzahura, politician
- Waker-Uz-Zaman (born 1966), Chief of Bangladesh Army Staff

== See also ==
- Tourist Spots in Sherpur
- Districts of Bangladesh
- History of Mymensingh
- Divisions of Bangladesh
- Upazilas of Bangladesh
- Administrative geography of Bangladesh
