= Jhenaigati Upazila =

Jhenaigati ঝিনাইগাতী
- Upazila
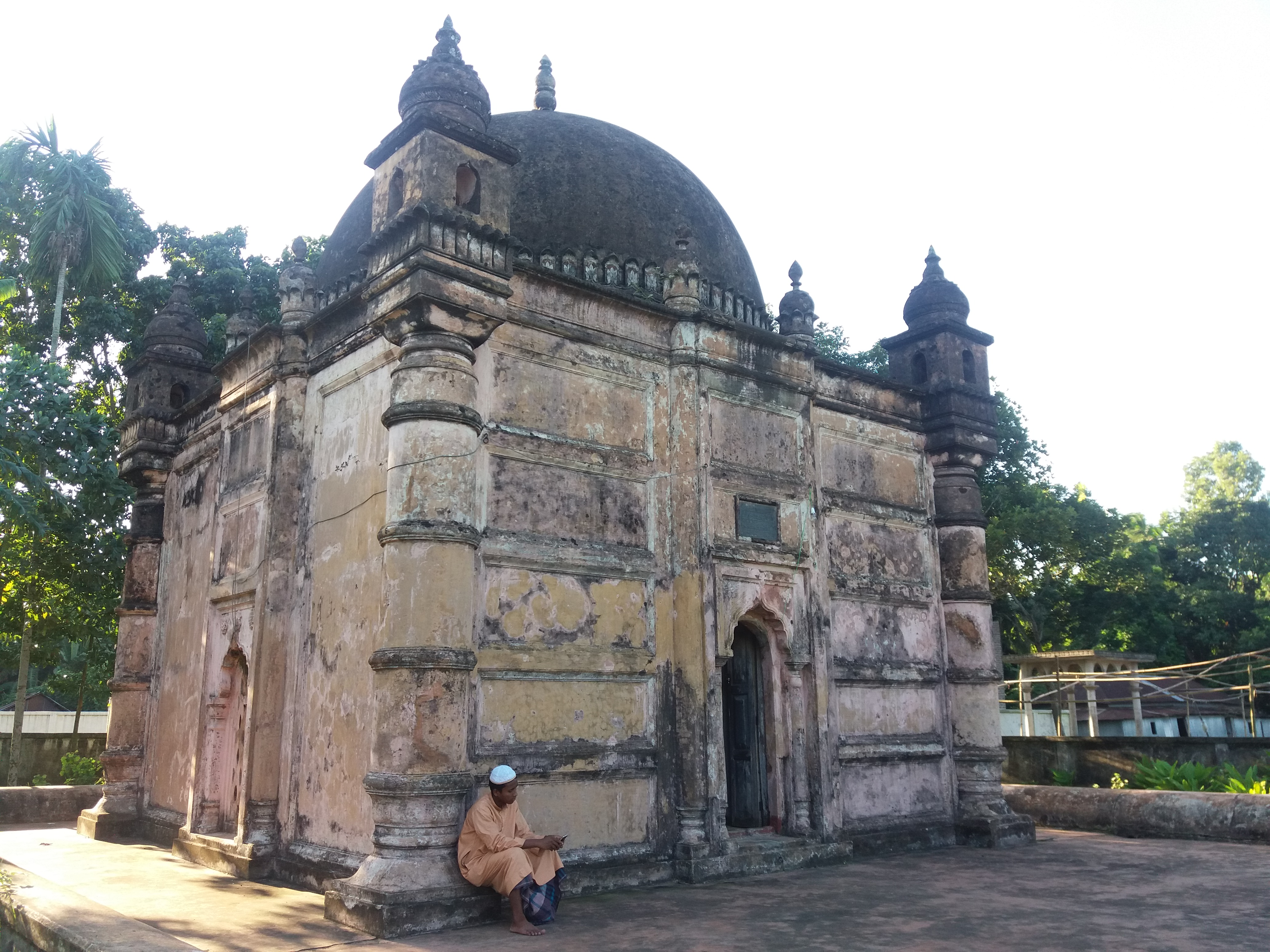
- Ghaghra Khan Bari Masjid, built 1608

- Coordinates: 25°11′N 90°4′E
- Country: Bangladesh
- Division: Mymensingh Division
- District: Sherpur District

Area
  - Total: 242.07 km^{2} (93.46 sq mi)

Population (2022)
  - Total: 178,148
  - Density: 735.94/km^{2} (1,906.1/sq mi)
- Time zone: UTC+6 (BST)
- Postal code: 2120
- Website: jhenaigati.sherpur.gov.bd

Jhenaigati Upazila mauza geocode map

Jhenaigati (Bengali: ঝিনাইগাতী) is an upazila of Sherpur District under the division of Mymensingh, Bangladesh.

== Geography ==
Jhenaigati is located at 25.1833°N 90.0667°E. It has 30,113 households and a total area of 231 km^{2}. The upazila is bounded by the Indian state of Meghalaya on the north, Sherpur sadar and Sreebardi upazila on the south, Nalirabari upazila on the east, and Sreebardi upazila on the west. The main rivers are Shomeshwari, Maharashi and Subarnakhali.

== Demographics ==
Historical population
Year	Pop.	±%
1981	122,412	—
1991	139,732	+14.1%
2001	155,067	+11.0%
2011	160,452	+3.5%
2022	178,148	+11.0%
Source: Bangladesh Bureau of Statistics

Religions in Jhenaigati Upazila (2022)
Religion	Percent
Islam	96.08%
Hinduism	2.09%
Christianity	1.79%
Other or not stated	0.04%

According to the 2022 Bangladeshi census, Jhenaigati Upazila had 48,436 households and a population of 178,148. 10.13% of the population were under 5 years of age. Jhenaigati had a literacy rate (age 7 and over) of 64.83%: 67.27% for males and 62.57% for females, and a sex ratio of 93.75 males for 100 females. 30,068 (16.88%) lived in urban areas. The ethnic population was 4,313 (2.42%), of which half were Garo, a third Koch.

Population of Jhenaigati upazila by ethnicity (2022)
1. Bengali (97.6%)
2. Garo (1.36%)
3. Others (1.06%)

== Administration ==
Jhenaigati Thana was formed in 1975 and it was turned into an upazila in 1983.

Jhenaigati Upazila has a Upazila Council and seven union councils: Kangsha, Dhanshail, Nalkura, Gouripur, Jhenaigati Sadar, Hatibandha and Malijhikanda. The union councils are subdivided into 75 mauzas and 117 villages.

U.N.O office, police station, banks, and many NGOs are here. Operationally important NGOs are BRAC, Asa, Grameen Bank, World Vision, SDS, Rangtia Satata Samchay, Rindan Samity and Didar Sangha.

== Education ==
There are 7 colleges in the upazila. They include Alhaj Shafiuddin Ahmed College, founded in 1986, and Jhenaigati Mahila Ardasha Degree College (2002). Adarsha College (1986) is the only public one.

According to Banglapedia, Ahmadnagar High School, founded in 1960, Jhenaigati Pilot High School (1961), and Malijhikanda High School (1948) are notable secondary schools.

== See also ==
- Upazilas of Bangladesh
- Districts of Bangladesh
- Divisions of Bangladesh
