= Mymensingh Division =

Division of Bangladesh

Mymensingh Division ময়মনসিংহ বিভাগ
- Division of Bangladesh
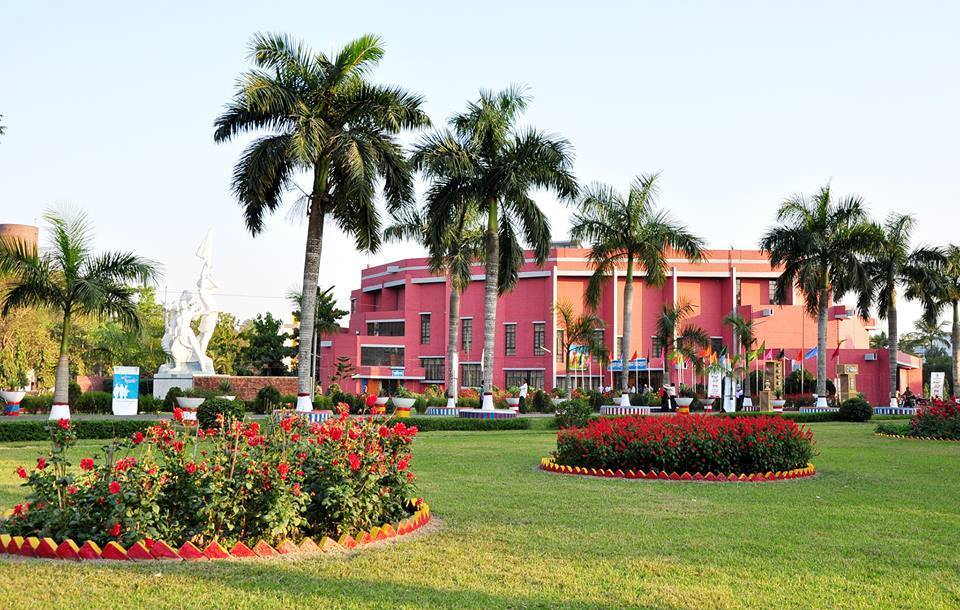
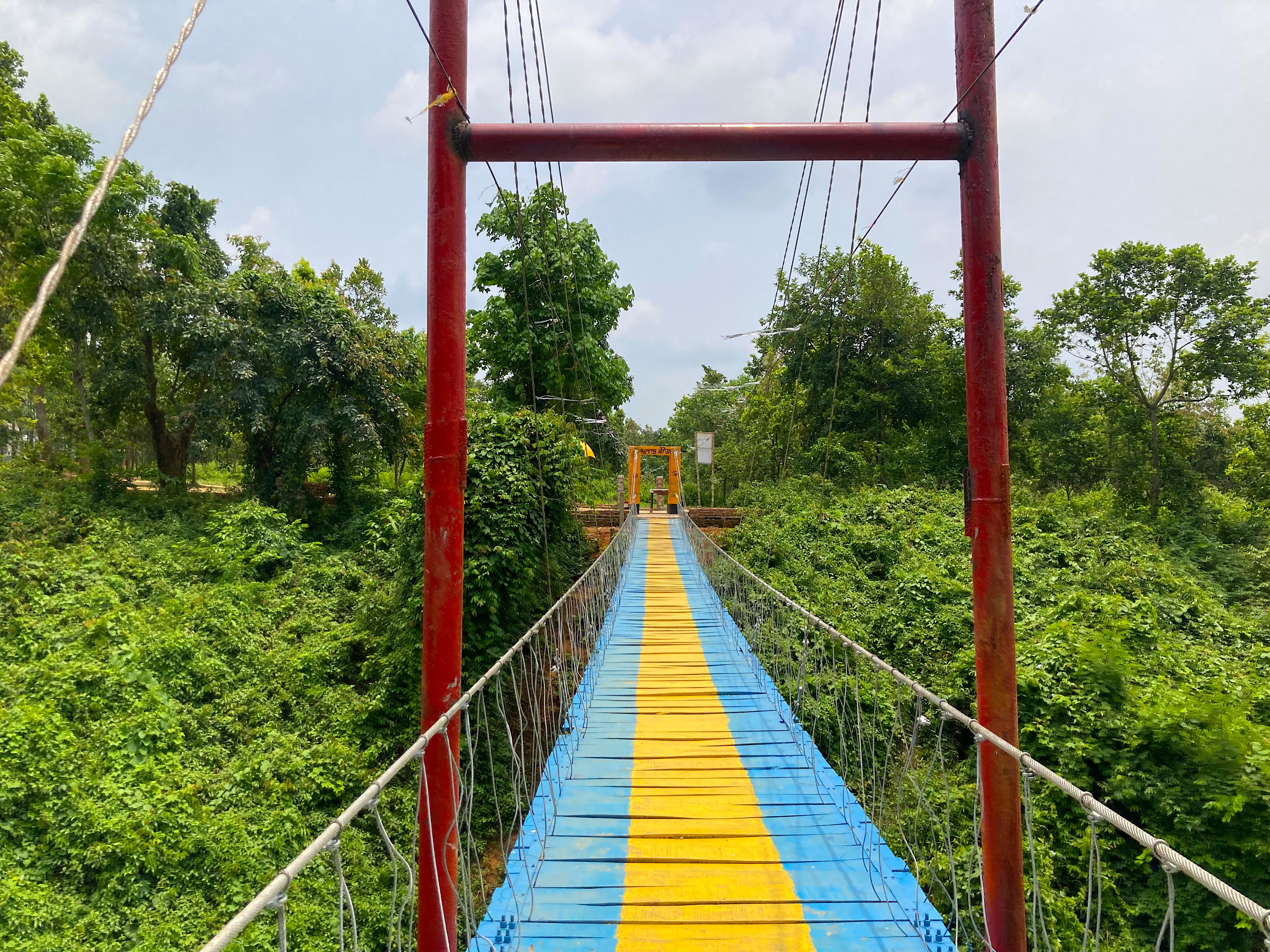
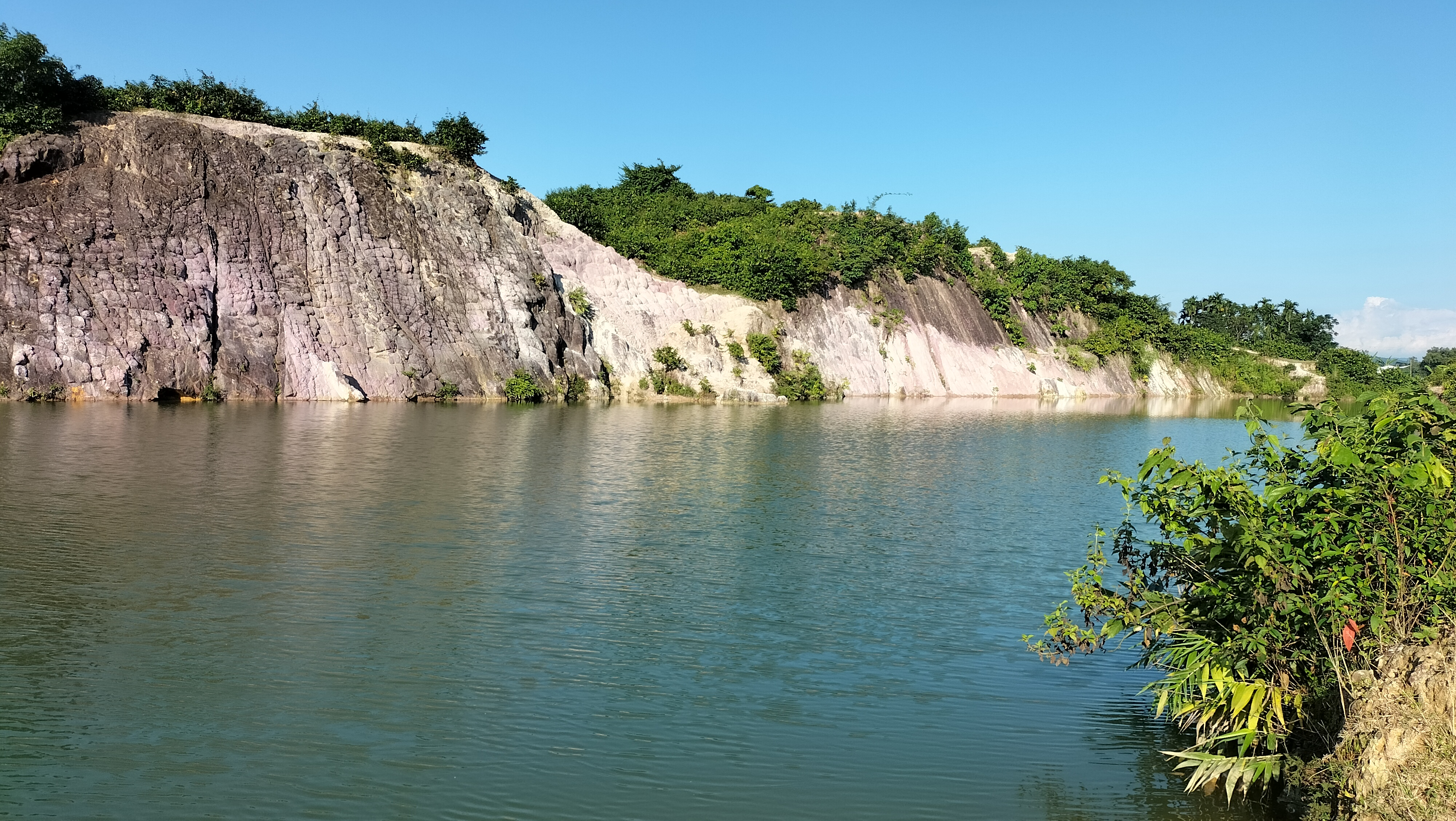
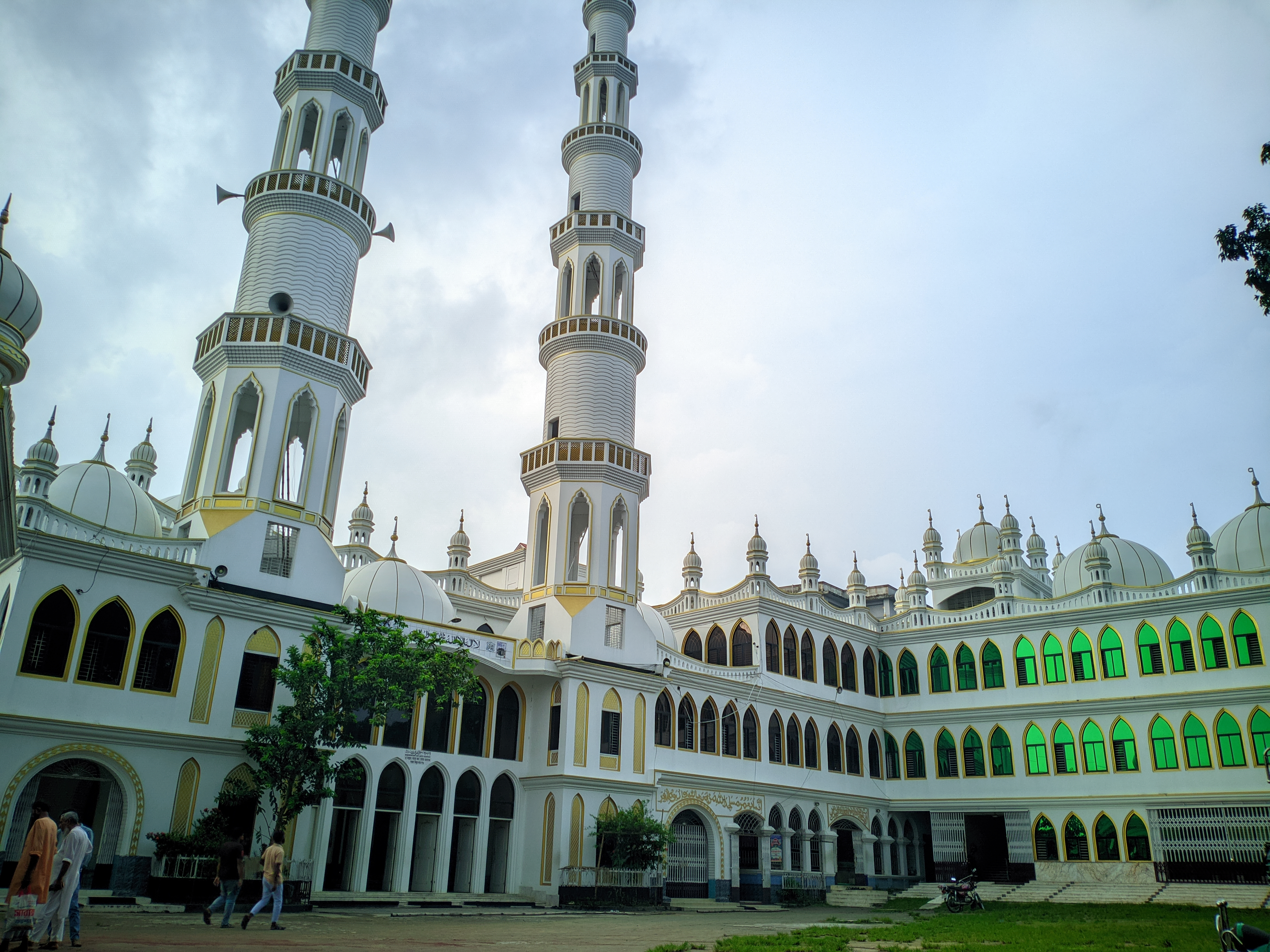
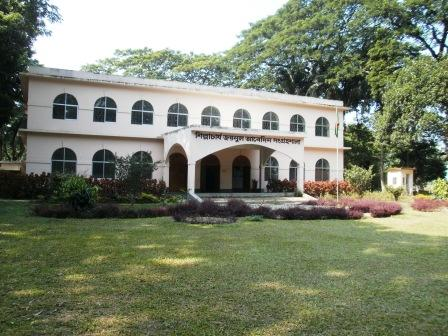
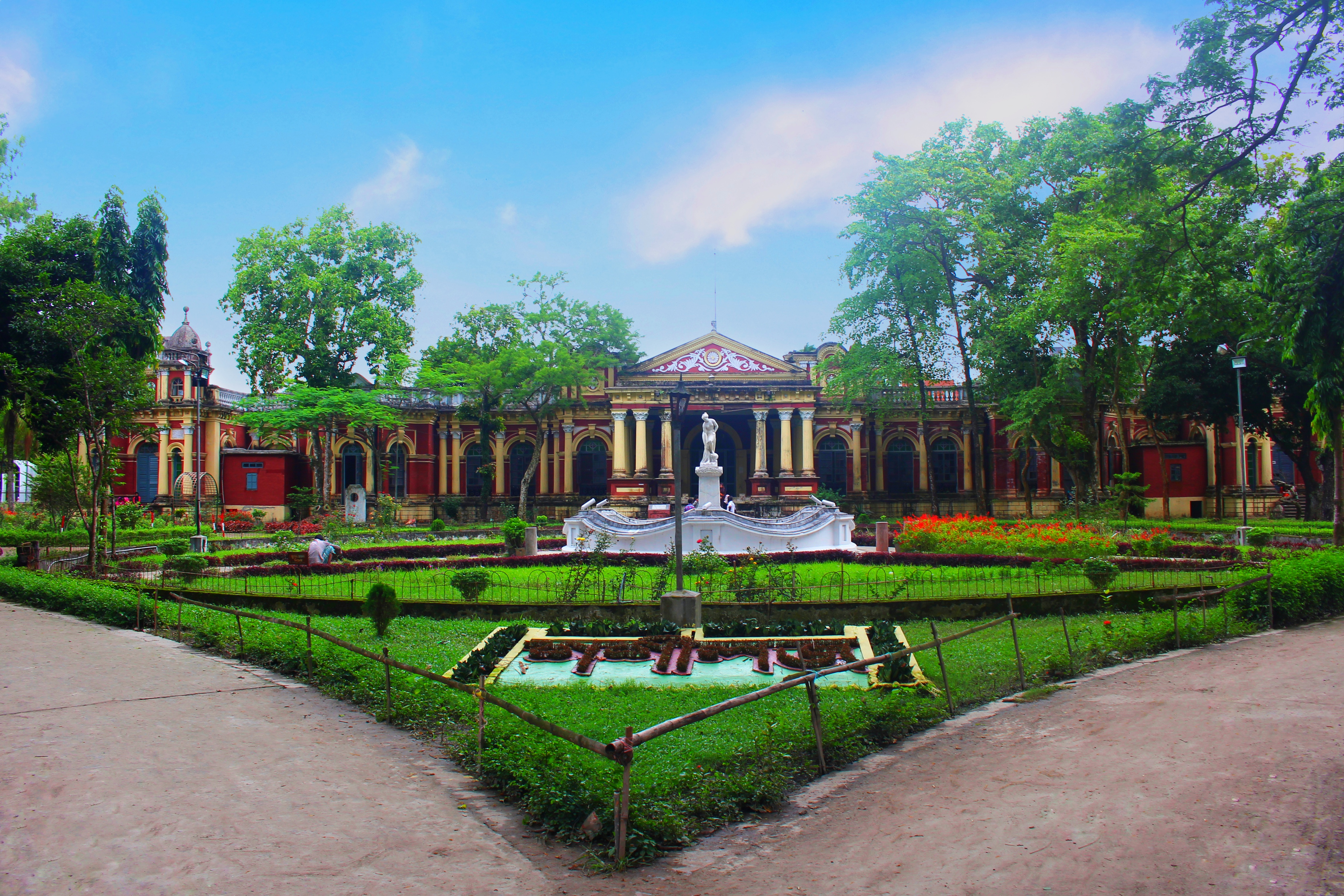
- Bangladesh Agricultural University Jhenaigati in Sherpur Birishiri Bluffs in Netrokona Mai Shaheba Jame Mosque Zainul Abedin Museum Shashi Lodge in Mymensingh

- Coordinates: 24°10′N 90°25′E
- Country: Bangladesh
- Established: 2015
- Capital and largest city: Mymensingh

Government
  - Parliamentary constituency: Jatiya Sangsad (24 seats)

Area
  - Division of Bangladesh: 10,584.06 km^{2} (4,086.53 sq mi)

Population (2022)
  - Division of Bangladesh: 12,225,449 (Enumerated)
  - Density: 1,155.081/km^{2} (2,991.647/sq mi)
  - Urban: 2,731,415
  - Rural: 9,493,331
  - Metro: 576,927
  - Adjusted Population: 12,637,472
- Time zone: UTC+6 (BST)
- ISO 3166 code: BD-H
- HDI (2019): 0.594 medium
- Website: www.mymensinghdiv.gov.bd

Mymensingh Division (Bengali: ময়মনসিংহ বিভাগ; Bengali pronunciation: [mɔ͡ɛmonʃiŋ bibʰag]) is one of the eight administrative divisions of Bangladesh. It has an area of 10,485 square kilometres (4,048 sq mi) and a population of 12,225,498 as of the 2022 census. It was formed in 2015 from districts previously composing the northern part of Dhaka Division. Its headquarters are in Mymensingh city in Mymensingh District. Mymensingh has four districts which it governs, Mymensingh District, Jamalpur District, Netrokona District, and Sherpur District.

== History ==
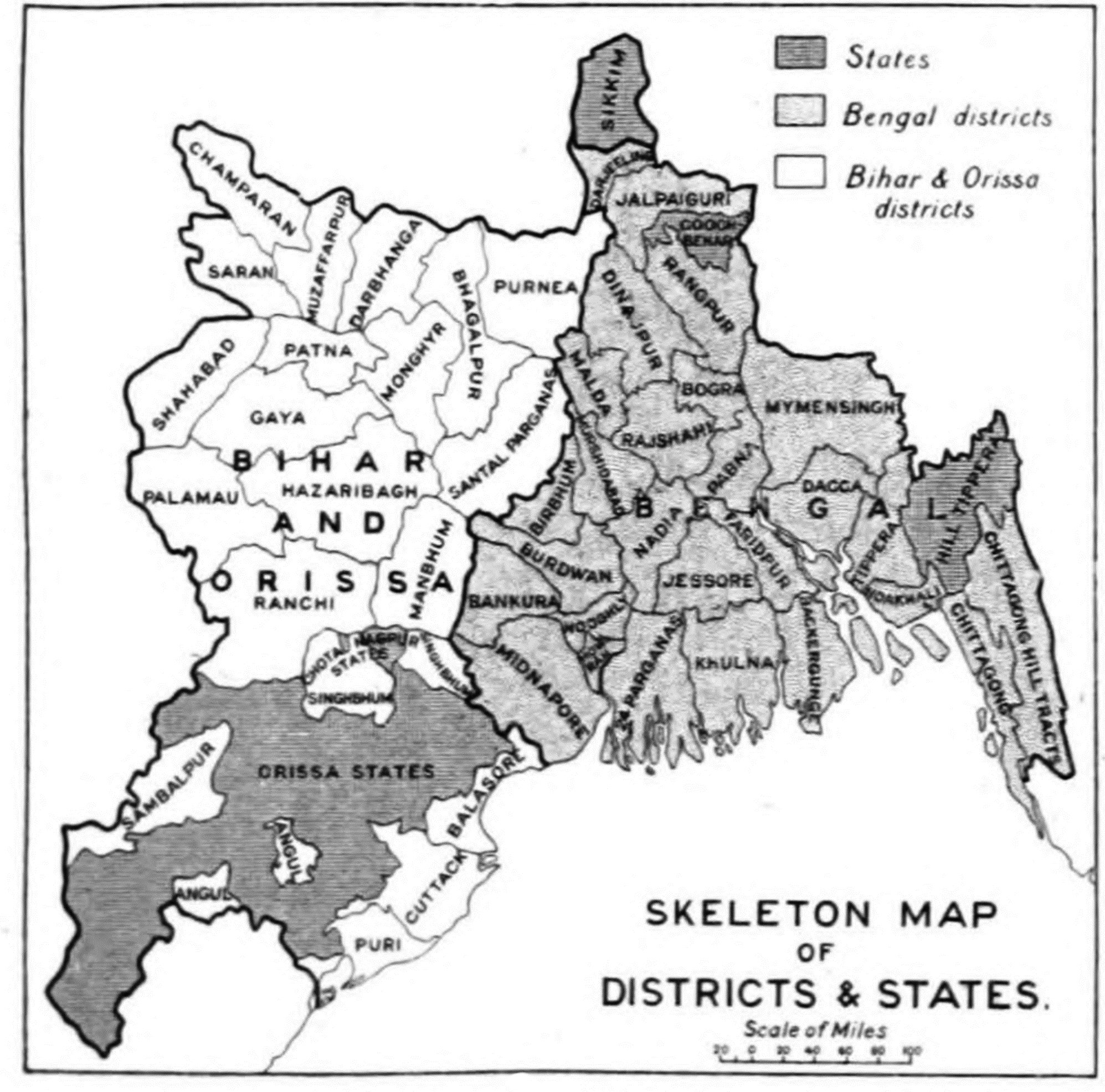
Provincial Map of Bengal showing the Greater Mymensingh Area (present Division with Tangail and Kishoreganj) in 1917.

Mymensingh’s history stretches far into antiquity. Around the 4th century BC, it was a significant part of the Vedic state of Mahajanapada. Over the centuries, the region witnessed the rise and fall of various dynasties, including the Gupta Empire, the Sena Dynasty, and the Muslim rulers during the medieval period. Each era left its mark on Mymensingh’s cultural and political landscape.

The Greater Mymensingh region (Mymensingh District along with five other neighbouring districts) was created as Mymensingh district by the British Indian government in 1787. Later it was reorganized in two phases into six districts: Mymensingh, Jamalpur, Kishoreganj, Netrakona, Sherpur, and Tangail.

On 12 January 2015, then PM Sheikh Hasina declared the establishment of Mymensingh Division. The initial intention was to carve six districts (those comprising the original Mymensingh district of 1787) out of the Dhaka Division. However, while four of the districts were eager for the establishment of a new division, people in the Tangail and Kishoreganj Districts wished to remain part of Dhaka Division. On 14 September 2015, Mymensingh was officially announced as a division consisting of four districts.

== Administrative divisions ==
Name	Headquarter	Area (km^{2})	Population 2011 Census	Population 2022 Census
Mymensingh District	Mymensingh	4,394.57	5,110,272	5,898,747
Jamalpur District	Jamalpur	2,115.16	2,292,674	2,499,627
Netrokona District	Netrokona	2,794.28	2,229,642	2,324,665
Sherpur District	Sherpur	1,364.67	1,358,325	1,501,751
Total District	4	10,584.06	10,990,913	12,224,790

Census figures for 2011, and 2022 are from Bangladesh Bureau of Statistics, Population Census Wing.

== Demographics ==
Religion in Mymensingh Division (2022)
Religion	Percent
Muslims	95.57%
Hindus	3.94%
Christians	0.46%
Others	0.03%

Muslims are the predominant religion with 95.57%, while Hindus and Christians are 3.94% and 0.46% of the population respectively. Mymensingh has the highest percentage of Muslims of all divisions of Bangladesh.

== Industry ==
=== Agriculture ===
Mymensingh has a rich and thriving agricultural sector. Crops such as jute, rice, vegetables, and wheat are being cultivated here. Many large rice fields make up the landscape. Rice from Mymensingh, and other parts of Bangladesh contribute heavily to the economy.

=== Textiles ===
Mymensingh is also known for its large textile industry, featuring factories all over the division. These textiles are then exported all over the world to various places.
