= List of members of the 5th Jatiya Sangsad =

5th Jatiya Sangsad
| ← | 4th | 6th | → |
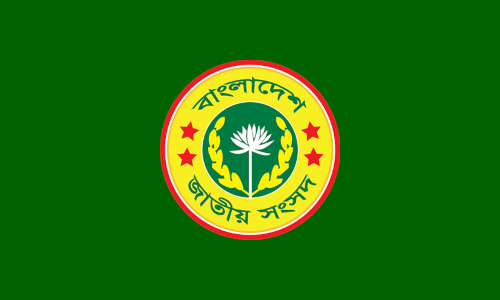
- Flag of the Jatiya Sangsad

Overview
- Legislative body: Bangladesh Parliament
- Term: 5 April 1991 – 24 November 1995
- Election: 1991
- Government: Bangladesh Nationalist Party
- Opposition: Awami League

Sovereign
- President: Shahabuddin Ahmed; Abdur Rahman Biswas

House of the Nation
- Speaker: Abdur Rahman Biswas; Sheikh Razzak Ali
- Deputy Speaker: Sheikh Razzak Ali; Humayun Khan Panni
- Leader of the House: Khaleda Zia
- Leader of the Opposition: Sheikh Hasina

The following is a list of Members of Parliament (MPs) elected to the Jatiya Sangsad (National Parliament of Bangladesh) from 300 Bangladeshi constituencies for the 5th Parliament of Bangladesh.

The list includes both MPs elected at the 1991 general election, held on 27 February 1991. Nominated women's members for reserved seat and Those subsequently elected in by-elections.

== Members ==
=== Member of Parliament ===
| Constituency | | Name | Party |
|---|---|---|---|
| 1 | Panchagarh-1 | Mirza Ghulam Hafiz | BNP |
| 2 | Panchagarh-2 | Mozahar Hossain | CPB |
| 3 | Thakurgaon-1 | Khademul Islam | AL |
| 4 | Thakurgaon-2 | Dabirul Islam | CPB |
| 5 | Thakurgaon-3 | Md. Mokhlesur Rahman | AL |
| 6 | Dinajpur-1 | Md. Aminul Islam | AL |
| 7 | Dinajpur-2 | Satish Chandra Roy | AL |
| 8 | Dinajpur-3 | M. Abdur Rahim | BaKSAL |
| 9 | Dinajpur-4 | Mizanur Rahman Manu | AL |
| 10 | Dinajpur-5 | Mostafizur Rahman Fizar | AL |
| 11 | Dinajpur-6 | Azizur Rahman Chowdhury | Jamaat-e-Islami |
| 12 | Nilphamari-1 | Abdur Rouf | AL |
| 13 | Nilphamari-2 | Md. Shamsuddoha | CPB |
| 14 | Nilphamari-3 | Azharul Islam | AL |
| 15 | Nilphamari-4 | Md. Abdul Hafiz | NAP (Muzaffar) |
| 16 | Lalmonirhat-1 | Joynal Abedin Sarker | JP |
| 17 | Lalmonirhat-2 | Mujibur Rahman | JP |
| 18 | Lalmonirhat-3 | Md. Reazuddin Ahmed | JP |
| 19 | Rangpur-1 | Karim Uddin Bharsha By-election: September 1991 | JP |
| 20 | Rangpur-2 | Paritosh Chakrabarti By-election: September 1991 | JP |
| 21 | Rangpur-3 | Hussain Muhammad Ershad | JP |
| 22 | Rangpur-4 | Shah Alam | JP |
| 23 | Rangpur-5 | Mizanur Rahman Chowdhury By-election: September 1991 | JP |
| 24 | Rangpur-6 | Shah Moazzem Hossain By-election: September 1991 | JP |
| 25 | Kurigram-1 | A.K.M. Shahidul Islam | JP |
| 26 | Kurigram-2 | Tajul Islam Choudhury | JP |
| 27 | Kurigram-3 | Md. Amjad Hossain Talukdar | AL |
| 28 | Kurigram-4 | Golam Hossain | JP |
| 29 | Gaibandha-1 | Hafizur Rahman Pramanik | JP |
| 30 | Gaibandha-2 | Abdur Rashid Sarkar | JP |
| 31 | Gaibandha-3 | Fazle Rabbi Chowdhury | JP |
| 32 | Gaibandha-4 | Lutfar Rahman Chowdhury | JP |
| 33 | Gaibandha-5 | Fazle Rabbi Miah | JP |
| 34 | Joypurhat-1 | Golam Rabbani | BNP |
| 35 | Joypurhat-2 | Abu Yusuf Mohammad Khalilur Rahman | BNP |
| 36 | Bogra-1 | Habibur Rahman | BNP |
| 37 | Bogra-2 | Md. Shahaduzzaman | Jamaat-e-Islami |
| 38 | Bogra-3 | Abdul Majid Talukdar | BNP |
| 39 | Bogra-4 | Azizul Haq Mollah Died: 10 April 1994 | BNP |
| 39 | Bogra-4 | Ziaul Haq Mollah By-election: 1994 | BNP |
| 40 | Bogra-5 | Golam Mohammad Siraj | BNP |
| 41 | Bogra-6 | Mojibar Rahman | BNP |
| 42 | Bogra-7 | Helaluzzaman Talukder Lalu By-election: September 1991 | BNP |
| 43 | Nawabgonj-1 | Shahjahan Miah | BNP |
| 44 | Nawabgonj-2 | Syed Monjur Hossain | BNP |
| 45 | Nawabgonj-3 | Latifur Rahman | Jamaat-e-Islami |
| 46 | Naogaon-1 | Azizur Rahman Miah | AL |
| 47 | Naogaon-2 | Shahiduzzaman Sarker | AL |
| 48 | Naogaon-3 | Akhtar Hameed Siddiqui | BNP |
| 49 | Naogaon-4 | Nasir Uddin | Jamaat-e-Islami |
| 50 | Naogaon-5 | Shamsuddin Ahmed | BNP |
| 51 | Naogaon-6 | Alamgir Kabir | BNP |
| 52 | Rajshahi-1 | Aminul Haque | BNP |
| 53 | Rajshahi-2 | Kabir Hossain | BNP |
| 54 | Rajshahi-3 | Sardar Amjad Hossain | JP |
| 55 | Rajshahi-4 | Tajul Islam Md. Faruk | AL |
| 56 | Rajshahi-5 | Azizur Rahman | BNP |
| 57 | Natore-1 | Fazlur Rahman Potol | BNP |
| 58 | Natore-2 | Shankar Gobind Chowdhury | AL |
| 59 | Natore-3 | Md. Abu Bakar Died: 1995 | Jamaat-e-Islami |
| 59 | Natore-3 | Kazi Golam Morshed By-election: 1995 | BNP |
| 60 | Natore-4 | Md. Abdul Quddus | AL |
| 61 | Sirajganj-1 | Mohammed Nasim | AL |
| 62 | Sirajganj-2 | Mirza Muraduzzaman | BNP |
| 63 | Sirajganj-3 | Abdul Mannan Talukder | BNP |
| 64 | Sirajganj-4 | M Akbar Ali | BNP |
| 65 | Sirajganj-5 | Shahidullah Khan | BNP |
| 66 | Sirajganj-6 | Ansar Ali Siddiqui | BNP |
| 67 | Sirajganj-7 | Kamruddin Ahia Khan Majlish | BNP |
| 68 | Pabna-1 | Motiur Rahman Nizami | Jamaat-e-Islami |
| 69 | Pabna-2 | Osman Ghani Khan | BNP |
| 70 | Pabna-3 | Saiful Azam | BNP |
| 71 | Pabna-4 | Sirajul Islam Sarder | BNP |
| 72 | Pabna-5 | Abdus Sobhan | Jamaat-e-Islami |
| 73 | Meherpur-1 | Abdul Mannan | AL |
| 74 | Meherpur-2 | Abdul Gani | BNP |
| 75 | Kushtia-1 | Ahsanul Haq Mollah | BNP |
| 76 | Kushtia-2 | Abdur Rouf Chowdhury | BNP |
| 77 | Kushtia-3 | K M Abdul Khaleq Chontu | BNP |
| 78 | Kushtia-4 | Abdul Awal Mia | AL |
| 79 | Chuadanga-1 | Miah Mohammed Monsur Ali | BNP |
| 80 | Chuadanga-2 | Habibur Rahman | Jamaat-e-Islami |
| 81 | Jhenidah-1 | Abdul Wahab | BNP |
| 82 | Jhenidah-2 | Mashiur Rahman | BNP |
| 83 | Jhenidah-3 | Shahidul Islam Master | BNP |
| 84 | Jhenidah-4 | Shahiduzzaman Beltu | BNP |
| 85 | Jessore-1 | Tabibar Rahman Sarder | AL |
| 86 | Jessore-2 | Rafiqul Islam | AL |
| 87 | Jessore-3 | Raushan Ali | AL |
| 88 | Jessore-4 | Shah Hadiuzzaman | AL |
| 89 | Jessore-5 | Khan Tipu Sultan | AL |
| 90 | Jessore-6 | Md. Shakhawat Hossain | Jamaat-e-Islami |
| 91 | Magura-1 | Majid-ul-Haq | BNP |
| 92 | Magura-2 | Mohammad Asaduzzaman Died: 25 December 1993 | AL |
| 92 | Magura-2 | Quazi Kamal By-election: March 1994 | BNP |
| 93 | Narail-1 | Dhirendra Nath Saha | AL |
| 94 | Narail-2 | Sharif Khasruzzaman | AL |
| 95 | Bagerhat-1 | Mozammel Hossain | AL |
| 96 | Bagerhat-2 | Abu Saleh Mohammad Mustafizur Rahman | BNP |
| 97 | Bagerhat-3 | Talukder Abdul Khaleque | AL |
| 98 | Bagerhat-4 | Abdus Sattar Akon | Jamaat-e-Islami |
| 99 | Khulna-1 | Sheikh Harunur Rashid | AL |
| 100 | Khulna-2 | Sheikh Razzak Ali | BNP |
| 101 | Khulna-3 | Ashraf Hossain | BNP |
| 102 | Khulna-4 | Mostafa Rashidi Suja | AL |
| 103 | Khulna-5 | Salahuddin Yusuf | AL |
| 104 | Khulna-6 | Shah Md. Ruhul Quddus | Jamaat-e-Islami |
| 105 | Shatkhira-1 | Ansar Ali | Jamaat-e-Islami |
| 106 | Satkhira-2 | Kazi Shamsur Rahman | Jamaat-e-Islami |
| 107 | Satkhira-3 | AM Riasat Ali Biswas | Jamaat-e-Islami |
| 108 | Satkhira-4 | Mansur Ahmed Gazi | AL |
| 109 | Satkhira-5 | Gazi Nazrul Islam | Jamaat-e-Islami |
| 110 | Barguna-1 | Dhirendra Debnath Shambhu | AL |
| 111 | Barguna-2 | Nurul Islam Moni | Independent |
| 112 | Barguna-3 | Mujibur Rahman Talukder | AL |
| 113 | Patuakhali-1 | Mohammad Keramat Ali | BNP |
| 114 | Patuakhali-2 | A. S. M. Feroz | AL |
| 115 | Patuakhali-3 | AKM Jahangir Hossain | AL |
| 116 | Patuakhali-4 | Anwarul Islam | AL |
| 117 | Bhola-1 | Tofail Ahmed | AL |
| 118 | Bhola-2 | Mosharraf Hossain Shahjahan By-election: September 1991 | BNP |
| 119 | Bhola-3 | Hafizuddin Ahmed | Independent |
| 120 | Bhola-4 | M. M. Nazrul Islam Died: 17 September 1992 | AL |
| 120 | Bhola-4 | Jafar Ullah Chowdhury By-election: 1992 | AL |
| 121 | Barisal-1 | Abul Hasnat Abdullah | AL |
| 122 | Barisal-2 | Rashed Khan Menon | WPB |
| 123 | Barisal-3 | Mosharraf Hossain Mongu | BNP |
| 124 | Barisal-4 | Mohiuddin Ahmed | AL |
| 125 | Barisal-5 | Abdur Rahman Biswas Become President: 8 October 1991 | BNP |
| 125 | Barisal-5 | Majibur Rahman Sarwar By-election: December 1991 | BNP |
| 126 | Barisal-6 | Md. Yunus Khan Died: 22 November 1994 | BNP |
| 126 | Barisal-6 | Md. Abdur Rashid Khan By-election: January 1995 | BNP |
| 127 | Jhalakathi-1 | Shahjahan Omar | BNP |
| 128 | Jhalakathi-2 | Gazi Aziz Ferdous | BNP |
| 129 | Pirojpur-1 | Sudhangshu Shekhar Haldar | AL |
| 130 | Pirojpur-2 | Anwar Hossain Manju | JP |
| 131 | Pirojpur-3 | Mohiuddin Ahmed | BaKSAL |
| 132 | Pirojpur with Barisal | Syed Shahidul Huque Jamal | BNP |
| 133 | Tangail-1 | Abul Hasan Chowdhury | AL |
| 134 | Tangail-2 | Abdus Salam Pintu | BNP |
| 135 | Tangail-3 | Lutfor Rahman Khan Azad | BNP |
| 136 | Tangail-4 | Shajahan Siraj | JaSaD (Siraj) |
| 137 | Tangail-5 | Mahmudul Hasan | JP |
| 138 | Tangail-6 | Khandaker Abu Taher | BNP |
| 139 | Tangail-7 | Khandaker Badar Uddin | BNP |
| 140 | Tangail-8 | Humayun Khan Panni | BNP |
| 141 | Jamalpur-1 | Abul Kalam Azad | AL |
| 142 | Jamalpur-2 | Rashed Mosharraf | AL |
| 143 | Jamalpur-3 | Mirza Azam | AL |
| 144 | Jamalpur-4 | Abdus Salam Talukder | BNP |
| 145 | Jamalpur-5 | Sirajul Haq | BNP |
| 146 | Sherpur-1 | Shah Rafiqul Bari Chowdhury | JP |
| 147 | Sherpur-2 | Matia Chowdhury | AL |
| 148 | Sherpur-3 | Serajul Haque Died: 28 October 1994 | BNP |
| 148 | Sherpur-3 | Mahmudul Haque Rubel By-election: 1994 | Independent |
| 149 | Mymensingh-1 | Promode Mankin | AL |
| 150 | Mymensingh-2 | Md. Shamsul Haque | AL |
| 151 | Mymensingh-3 | Nazrul Islam Died: 8 August 1992 | AL |
| 151 | Mymensingh-3 | Rowshan Ara Nazrul By-election: October 1992 | AL |
| 152 | Mymensingh-4 | AKM Fazlul Haque | BNP |
| 153 | Mymensingh-5 | Keramat Ali Talukdar | BNP |
| 154 | Mymensingh-6 | Khandaker Amirul Islam | BNP |
| 155 | Mymensingh-7 | Md. Abdul Khaleq | BNP |
| 156 | Mymensingh-8 | Khurram Khan Chowdhury | JP |
| 157 | Mymensingh-9 | Anwarul Hossain Khan Chowdhury | BNP |
| 158 | Mymensingh-10 | Altaf Hossain Golandaz | AL |
| 159 | Mymensingh-11 | Aman Ullah Chowdhury | BNP |
| 160 | Mymensingh with Netrokona | Mosharraf Hossain | AL |
| 161 | Netrokona-1 | Abdul Karim Abbasi | BNP |
| 162 | Netrokona-2 | Abu Abbas | BNP |
| 163 | Netrokona-3 | Zubed Ali | AL |
| 164 | Netrokona-4 | Lutfozzaman Babar | BNP |
| 165 | Kishoreganj-1 | ABM Zahidul Haq | BNP |
| 166 | Kishoreganj-2 | Akhtaruzzaman Ranjan | BNP |
| 167 | Kishoreganj-3 | Ataur Rahman Khan | BNP |
| 168 | Kishoreganj-4 | Mizanul Haque | AL |
| 169 | Kishoreganj-5 | Mohammad Abdul Hamid | AL |
| 170 | Kishoreganj-6 | Aamir Uddin Ahmod | BNP |
| 171 | Kishoreganj-7 | Abdul Latif Bhuiyan | BNP |
| 172 | Manikganj-1 | Khandaker Delwar Hossain | BNP |
| 173 | Manikganj-2 | Harunur Rashid Khan Monno | BNP |
| 174 | Manikganj-3 | Nizam Uddin Khan | BNP |
| 175 | Manikganj-4 | Shamsul Islam Khan | BNP |
| 176 | Munshiganj-1 | A. Q. M. Badruddoza Chowdhury | BNP |
| 177 | Munshiganj-2 | Muhammad Hamidullah Khan | BNP |
| 178 | Munshiganj-3 | Shamsul Islam | BNP |
| 179 | Munshiganj-4 | Md. Abdul Hai | BNP |
| 180 | Dhaka-1 | Nazmul Huda | BNP |
| 181 | Dhaka-2 | Abdul Mannan | BNP |
| 182 | Dhaka-3 | Amanullah Aman | BNP |
| 183 | Dhaka-4 | Salah Uddin Ahmed | BNP |
| 184 | Dhaka-5 | Mohammad Quamrul Islam By-election: September 1991 | BNP |
| 185 | Dhaka-6 | Mirza Abbas | BNP |
| 186 | Dhaka-7 | Sadeque Hossain Khoka | BNP |
| 187 | Dhaka-8 | Mir Shawkat Ali | BNP |
| 188 | Dhaka-9 | Muhammad Jamiruddin Sarkar By-election: September 1991 | BNP |
| 189 | Dhaka-10 | Abdul Mannan | BNP |
| 190 | Dhaka-11 | Harun Rashid Mollah Died: November 1992 | BNP |
| 190 | Dhaka-11 | Syed Muhammad Moshin By-election: February 1993 | BNP |
| 191 | Dhaka-12 | Md. Niamatullah | BNP |
| 192 | Dhaka-13 | Ziaur Rahman Khan | BNP |
| 193 | Gazipur-1 | Md. Rahamat Ali | AL |
| 194 | Gazipur-2 | M. A. Mannan | BNP |
| 195 | Gazipur-3 | Asfar Hossain Mollah | AL |
| 196 | Gazipur-4 | Hannan Shah | BNP |
| 197 | Narsingdi-1 | Shamsuddin Ahmed Ishaq | BNP |
| 198 | Narsingdi-2 | Abdul Moyeen Khan | BNP |
| 199 | Narsingdi-3 | Abdul Mannan Bhuiyan | BNP |
| 200 | Narsingdi-4 | Sardar Shakhawat Hossain Bokul | BNP |
| 201 | Narsingdi-5 | Abdul Ali Mridha | BNP |
| 202 | Narayanganj-1 | Abdul Matin Chowdhury | BNP |
| 203 | Narayanganj-2 | Ataur Rahman Khan Angur | BNP |
| 204 | Narayanganj-3 | Rezaul Karim Mannan | BNP |
| 205 | Narayanganj-4 | Sirajul Islam | BNP |
| 206 | Narayanganj-5 | Abul Kalam | BNP |
| 207 | Rajbari-1 | Abdul Wajed Chowdhury Died: 31 July 1992 | AL |
| 207 | Rajbari-1 | Kazi Keramat Ali By-election: October 1992 | AL |
| 208 | Rajbari-2 | AKM Aszad | Jamaat-e-Islami |
| 209 | Faridpur-1 | Md. Abdur Rouf Miah | AL |
| 210 | Faridpur-2 | Syeda Sajeda Chowdhury | AL |
| 211 | Faridpur-3 | Chowdhury Kamal Ibne Yusuf | BNP |
| 212 | Faridpur-4 | Mosharraf Hossain | AL |
| 213 | Faridpur-5 | Qazi Abu Yusuf | AL |
| 214 | Gopalganj-1 | Kazi Abdur Rashid | AL |
| 215 | Gopalganj-2 | Sheikh Fazlul Karim Selim | AL |
| 216 | Gopalganj-3 | Sheikh Hasina | AL |
| 217 | Madaripur-1 | Ilias Ahmed Chowdhury Died: 18 May 1991 | AL |
| 217 | Madaripur-1 | Noor-E-Alam Chowdhury Liton By-election: September 1991 | AL |
| 218 | Madaripur-2 | Shajahan Khan By-election: September 1991 | AL |
| 219 | Madaripur-3 | Syed Abul Hossain | AL |
| 220 | Shariatpur-1 | K. M. Hemayet Ullah Auranga | AL |
| 221 | Shariatpur-2 | Shawkat Ali | AL |
| 222 | Shariatpur-3 | Abdur Razzaq | BaKSAL |
| 223 | Sunamganj-1 | Nozir Hossain | CPB |
| 224 | Sunamganj-2 | Suranjit Sengupta | Ganatantri Party |
| 225 | Sunamganj-3 | Abdus Samad Azad | AL |
| 226 | Sunamganj-4 | Abduz Zahur Miah | AL |
| 227 | Sunamganj-5 | Abdul Mazid | JP |
| 228 | Sylhet-1 | Khandaker Abdul Malik | BNP |
| 229 | Sylhet-2 | Maqsood Ebne Aziz Lama | JP |
| 230 | Sylhet-3 | Abdul Mukit Khan | JP |
| 231 | Sylhet-4 | Imran Ahmad | AL |
| 232 | Sylhet-5 | Obaidul Haque | IOJ |
| 233 | Sylhet-6 | Sharaf Uddin Khashru | JP |
| 234 | Moulvibazar-1 | Ebadur Rahman Chowdhury | JP |
| 235 | Moulvibazar-2 | Nawab Ali Abbas Khan | JP |
| 236 | Moulvibazar-3 | Azizur Rahman | AL |
| 237 | Moulvibazar-4 | Md. Abdus Shahid | AL |
| 238 | Habiganj-1 | Khalilur Rahman Chowdhury | JP |
| 239 | Habiganj-2 | Sharif Uddin Ahmed | AL |
| 240 | Habiganj-3 | Abu Lais Md. Mubin Chowdhury | JP |
| 241 | Habiganj-4 | Enamul Haque Mostafa Shahid | AL |
| 242 | Brahmanbaria-1 | Murshed Kamal | JP |
| 243 | Brahmanbaria-2 | Abdus Sattar Bhuiyan | BNP |
| 244 | Brahmanbaria-3 | Haroon Al Rashid | BNP |
| 245 | Brahmanbaria-4 | Mia Abdullah Wazed | BNP |
| 246 | Brahmanbaria-5 | Kazi Md. Anwar Hossain | JP |
| 247 | Brahmanbaria-6 | A. T. M. Wali Ashraf Died: 19 November 1994 | BNP |
| 247 | Brahmanbaria-6 | Shahjahan Hawlader Sujan By-election: 1994 | BNP |
| 248 | Comilla-1 | M. K. Anwar | BNP |
| 249 | Comilla-2 | Khandaker Mosharraf Hossain | BNP |
| 250 | Comilla-3 | Rafiqul Islam Miah | BNP |
| 251 | Comilla-4 | Manjurul Ahsan Munshi | BNP |
| 252 | Comilla-5 | Abdul Matin Khasru | AL |
| 253 | Comilla-6 | Redwan Ahmed | Independent |
| 254 | Comilla-7 | Abu Taher | BNP |
| 255 | Comilla-8 | Akbar Hossain | BNP |
| 256 | Comilla-9 | Monirul Haq Chowdhury | JP |
| 257 | Comilla-10 | ATM Alamgir | BNP |
| 258 | Comilla-11 | AKM Kamruzzaman | BNP |
| 259 | Comilla-12 | Kazi Zafar Ahmed | JP |
| 260 | Chandpur-1 | Mesbah Uddin | AL |
| 261 | Chandpur-2 | Md. Nurul Huda | BNP |
| 262 | Chandpur-3 | Alam Khan | BNP |
| 263 | Chandpur-4 | Mohammad Abdullah | BNP |
| 264 | Chandpur-5 | M. A. Matin | BNP |
| 265 | Chandpur-6 | Alamgir Hyder Khan | BNP |
| 266 | Feni-1 | Begum Khaleda Zia | BNP |
| 267 | Feni-2 | Joynal Hazari | AL |
| 268 | Feni-3 | Mahbubul Alam Tara | BNP |
| 269 | Noakhali-1 | Zainul Abdin Farroque | BNP |
| 270 | Noakhali-2 | Barkat Ullah Bulu | BNP |
| 271 | Noakhali-3 | Salah Uddin Kamran | BNP |
| 272 | Noakhali-4 | Md. Shahjahan | BNP |
| 273 | Noakhali-5 | Moudud Ahmed | JP |
| 274 | Noakhali-6 | Md. Wali Ullah | AL |
| 275 | Laxmipur-1 | Ziaul Haque Zia | BNP |
| 276 | Laxmipur-2 | Mohammad Mohammadullah | BNP |
| 277 | Laxmipur-3 | Khairul Enam | BNP |
| 278 | Laxmipur-4 | Abdur Rab Chowdhury | BNP |
| 279 | Chittagong-1 | Mohamad Ali Jinnah | BNP |
| 280 | Chittagong-2 | L. K. Siddiqi | BNP |
| 281 | Chittagong-3 | Alhaz Mustafizur Rahman | AL |
| 282 | Chittagong-4 | Syed Najibul Bashar Maizbhandari | AL |
| 283 | Chittagong-5 | Syed Wahidul Alam | BNP |
| 284 | Chittagong-6 | Salahuddin Quader Chowdhury | NDP |
| 285 | Chittagong-7 | Md. Yusuf | CPB |
| 286 | Chittagong-8 | Amir Khasru Mahmud Chowdhury By-election: September 1991 | BNP |
| 287 | Chittagong-9 | Abdullah Al Noman | BNP |
| 288 | Chittagong-10 | Sirajul Islam | BNP |
| 289 | Chittagong-11 | Md. Shah Newaz Chowdhury | BNP |
| 290 | Chittagong-12 | Akhtaruzzaman Chowdhury Babu | AL |
| 291 | Chittagong-13 | Oli Ahmad | BNP |
| 292 | Chittagong-14 | Shajahan Chowdhury | Jamaat-e-Islami |
| 293 | Chittagong-15 | Sultanul Kabir Chowdhury | AL |
| 294 | Cox's Bazar-1 | Enamul Haq Manju | Jamaat-e-Islami |
| 295 | Cox's Bazar-2 | Md. Ishak | BaKSAL |
| 296 | Cox's Bazar-3 | Mostaq Ahmad Chowdhury | AL |
| 297 | Cox's Bazar-4 | Shahjahan Chowdhury | BNP |
| 298 | Khagrachari | Kalparanjan Chakma | AL |
| 299 | Rangamati | Dipankar Talukdar | AL |
| 300 | Bandarban | Bir Bahadur Ushwe Sing | AL |

=== Members of the Reserved Women's Seat ===
| Women's Seat | | Name | Political Party |
|---|---|---|---|
| 301 | Women's Seat-1 | Khurshid Jahan | BNP |
| 302 | Women's Seat-2 | Shaheda Sarkar | BNP |
| 303 | Women's Seat-3 | Rebecca Mahmoud | BNP |
| 304 | Women's Seat-4 | Sahin Ara Haque | BNP |
| 305 | Women's Seat-5 | Raushan Elahi | BNP |
| 306 | Women's Seat-6 | Lutfun Nesa Hossain | BNP |
| 307 | Women's Seat-7 | Rashida Khatun | Jamaat-e-Islami |
| 308 | Women's Seat-8 | Selina Shahid | BNP |
| 309 | Women's Seat-9 | Shamsun Nahar Ahmed | BNP |
| 310 | Women's Seat-10 | Farida Rahman | BNP |
| 311 | Women's Seat-11 | Syeda Nargis Ali | BNP |
| 312 | Women's Seat-12 | Raushan Ara Hena | BNP |
| 313 | Women's Seat-13 | Selima Rahman | BNP |
| 314 | Women's Seat-14 | Anwara Habib | BNP |
| 315 | Women's Seat-15 | Rahima Khandaker | BNP |
| 316 | Women's Seat-16 | Khondaker Nurjahan Yesmin Bulbul | BNP |
| 317 | Women's Seat-17 | Bani Ashraf | BNP |
| 318 | Women's Seat-18 | Farida Hasan | BNP |
| 319 | Women's Seat-19 | Sarwari Rahman | BNP |
| 320 | Women's Seat-20 | K. J. Hamida Khanam | BNP |
| 321 | Women's Seat-21 | Shamsunnahar Khwaja Ahsanullah | BNP |
| 322 | Women's Seat-22 | Jahanara Begum | BNP |
| 323 | Women's Seat-23 | Asma Khatun | Jamaat-e-Islami |
| 324 | Women's Seat-24 | Fatema Chowdhury Paru | BNP |
| 325 | Women's Seat-25 | Khaleda Rabbani | BNP |
| 326 | Women's Seat-26 | Asiya Rahman | BNP |
| 327 | Women's Seat-27 | Rabeya Chowdhury | BNP |
| 328 | Women's Seat-28 | Halima Khatun | BNP |
| 329 | Women's Seat-29 | Begum Rosy Kabir | BNP |
| 330 | Women's Seat-30 | Mamatching Marma | BNP |
