= List of members of the 6th Jatiya Sangsad =

6th Jatiya Sangsad
←	5th	7th	→
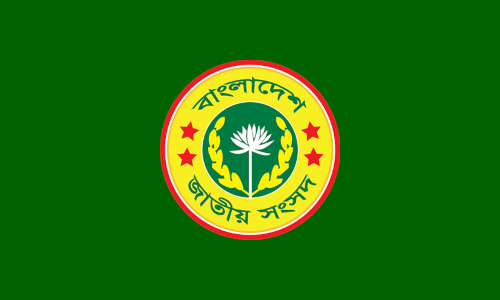
- Flag of the Jatiya Sangsad

Overview
- Legislative body: Bangladesh Parliament
- Term: 19 March 1996 – 30 March 1996
- Election: Feb 1996
- Government: Bangladesh Nationalist Party

Jatiya Sangsad
- Members: 300

The following is a list of Members of Parliament (MPs) elected to the Jatiya Sangsad (National Parliament of Bangladesh) from 300 Bangladeshi constituencies for the 6th Parliament of Bangladesh.

The list includes both MPs elected at the 1991 general election, held on 15 February 1996. Nominated women's members for reserved seat and Those subsequently elected in by-elections.

== Members ==
=== Elected members of parliament ===
No	Constituency	Name	Party	Notes
1	Panchagarh-1	Muhammad Jamiruddin Sircar	Bangladesh Nationalist Party	
2	Panchagarh-2	Mozahar Hossain	Bangladesh Nationalist Party	
3	Thakurgaon-1	Mirza Fakhrul Islam Alamgir	Bangladesh Nationalist Party	
4	Thakurgaon-2	Md. Julfiker Murtuja Chowdhury	Bangladesh Nationalist Party	
5	Thakurgaon-3	Abdul Malek	Bangladesh Nationalist Party	
6	Dinajpur-1	Syed Ahmed Reza Hossain	Bangladesh Nationalist Party	
7	Dinajpur-2	Mujibur Rahman	Bangladesh Nationalist Party	
8	Dinajpur-3	Khurshid Jahan	Bangladesh Nationalist Party	
9	Dinajpur-4	Abdul Halim	Bangladesh Nationalist Party	
10	Dinajpur-5	AZM Rezwanul Haque	Bangladesh Nationalist Party	
11	Dinajpur-6	Md. Atiur Rahman	Bangladesh Nationalist Party	
12	Nilphamari-1	Shahrin Islam Chowdhury Tuhin	Bangladesh Nationalist Party	
13	Nilphamari-2	Dewan Nurunnabi	Bangladesh Nationalist Party	
14	Nilphamari-3	Anwarul Kabir Chowdhury	Bangladesh Nationalist Party	
15	Nilphamari-4	Md. Abdul Hafiz	Bangladesh Nationalist Party	
16	Lalmonirhat-1	Hasanuzzaman Hasan	Bangladesh Nationalist Party	
17	Lalmonirhat-2	Saleh Uddin Ahmed	Bangladesh Nationalist Party	
18	Lalmonirhat-3	Asadul Habib Dulu	Bangladesh Nationalist Party	
19	Rangpur-1	vacant		
20	Rangpur-2	vacant		
21	Rangpur-3	vacant		
22	Rangpur-4	vacant		
23	Rangpur-5	vacant		
24	Rangpur-6	vacant		
25	Kurigram-1	Saifur Rahman Rana	Bangladesh Nationalist Party	
26	Kurigram-2	Md. Umar Farooq	Bangladesh Nationalist Party	
27	Kurigram-3	AKM Maidul Islam	Bangladesh Nationalist Party	
28	Kurigram-4	Abdul Bari Sarkar	Bangladesh Nationalist Party	
29	Gaibandha-1	vacant		
30	Gaibandha-2	Saiful Alam Saja	Bangladesh Nationalist Party	
31	Gaibandha-3	Mukhlesur Rahman	Bangladesh Nationalist Party	
32	Gaibandha-4	Abdul Mannan Mandal	Bangladesh Nationalist Party	
33	Gaibandha-5	Matiar Rahman Tuku	Bangladesh Nationalist Party	
34	Joypurhat-1	Golam Rabbani	Bangladesh Nationalist Party	
35	Joypurhat-2	Abu Yusuf Mohammad Khalilur Rahman	Bangladesh Nationalist Party	
36	Bogra-1	Habibur Rahman	Bangladesh Nationalist Party	
37	Bogra-2	Rezaul Bari Dina	Bangladesh Nationalist Party	
38	Bogra-3	Golam Mawla	Bangladesh Nationalist Party	
39	Bogra-4	Ziaul Haque Molla	Bangladesh Nationalist Party	
40	Bogra-5	Golam Mohammad Siraj	Bangladesh Nationalist Party	
41	Bogra-6	Mojibar Rahman	Bangladesh Nationalist Party	
42	Bogra-7	vacant		
43	Nawabgonj-1	Shahjahan Miah	Bangladesh Nationalist Party	
44	Nawabgonj-2	Syed Monjur Hossain	Bangladesh Nationalist Party	
45	Nawabgonj-3	Harunur Rashid	Bangladesh Nationalist Party	
46	Naogaon-1	Salek Chowdhury	Bangladesh Nationalist Party	
47	Naogaon-2	Shamsuzzoha Khan	Bangladesh Nationalist Party	
48	Naogaon-3	Akhtar Hameed Siddiqui	Bangladesh Nationalist Party	
49	Naogaon-4	Shamsul Alam Pramanik	Bangladesh Nationalist Party	
50	Naogaon-5	Shamsuddin Ahmed	Bangladesh Nationalist Party	
51	Naogaon-6	Alamgir Kabir	Bangladesh Nationalist Party	
52	Rajshahi-1	Aminul Haque	Bangladesh Nationalist Party	
53	Rajshahi-2	vacant		
54	Rajshahi-3	Muhammad Abdul Gafur	Bangladesh Nationalist Party	
55	Rajshahi-4	Abdus Sattar Mondal	Bangladesh Nationalist Party	
56	Rajshahi-5	Azizur Rahman	Bangladesh Nationalist Party	
57	Natore-1	Fazlur Rahman Patal	Bangladesh Nationalist Party	
58	Natore-2	Ruhul Quddus Talukdar	Bangladesh Nationalist Party	
59	Natore-3	Abul Kalam Azad	Bangladesh Nationalist Party	
60	Natore-4	Ekramul Alam	Bangladesh Nationalist Party	
61	Sirajganj-1	vacant		
62	Sirajganj-2	vacant		
63	Sirajganj-3	Abdul Mannan Talukder	Bangladesh Nationalist Party	
64	Sirajganj-4	Shamsul Alam	Independent	
65	Sirajganj-5	Shahidullah Khan	Bangladesh Nationalist Party	
66	Sirajganj-6	Ansar Ali Siddiki	Bangladesh Nationalist Party	
67	Sirajganj-7	Kamruddin Ahia Khan Majlish	Bangladesh Nationalist Party	
68	Pabna-1	Manzur Quader	Bangladesh Nationalist Party	
69	Pabna-2	AKM Salim Reza Habib	Bangladesh Nationalist Party	
70	Pabna-3	Saiful Azam	Bangladesh Nationalist Party	
71	Pabna-4	Sirajul Islam Sarder	Bangladesh Nationalist Party	
72	Pabna-5	Rafiqul Islam Bakul	Bangladesh Nationalist Party	
73	Meherpur-1	Ahammad Ali	Bangladesh Nationalist Party	
74	Meherpur-2	Abdul Gani	Bangladesh Nationalist Party	
75	Kushtia-1	Ahsanul Haq Mollah	Bangladesh Nationalist Party	
76	Kushtia-2	Shahidul Islam	Bangladesh Nationalist Party	
77	Kushtia-3	Sohrab Uddin	Bangladesh Nationalist Party	
78	Kushtia-4	Shahidullah Khan	Bangladesh Nationalist Party	
79	Chuadanga-1	Shamsuzzaman Dudu	Bangladesh Nationalist Party	
80	Chuadanga-2	Mozammel Haque	Bangladesh Nationalist Party	
81	Jhenidah-1	Abdul Wahab	Bangladesh Nationalist Party	
82	Jhenidah-2	Mashiur Rahman	Bangladesh Nationalist Party	
83	Jhenidah-3	Shahidul Islam Master	Bangladesh Nationalist Party	
84	Jhenidah-4	Shahiduzzaman Beltu	Bangladesh Nationalist Party	
85	Jessore-1	Mofiqul Hasan Tripti	Bangladesh Nationalist Party	
86	Jessore-2	Kazi Monirul Huda	Bangladesh Nationalist Party	
87	Jessore-3	Tariqul Islam	Bangladesh Nationalist Party	
88	Jessore-4	Nazrul Islam	Bangladesh Nationalist Party	
89	Jessore-5	Afsar Ahmad Siddiqui	Bangladesh Nationalist Party	
90	Jessore-6	Md. Shakhawat Hossain	Bangladesh Nationalist Party	
91	Magura-1	Majid-ul-Haq	Bangladesh Nationalist Party	
92	Magura-2	Quazi Kamal	Bangladesh Nationalist Party	
93	Narail-1	Monirul Islam Tipu	Bangladesh Nationalist Party	
94	Narail-2	Abdul Quader Sikder	Bangladesh Nationalist Party	
95	Bagerhat-1	Sheikh Mujibur Rahman	Bangladesh Nationalist Party	
96	Bagerhat-2	A. S. M. Mustafizur Rahman	Bangladesh Nationalist Party	
97	Bagerhat-3	AU Ahmed	Bangladesh Nationalist Party	
98	Bagerhat-4	Arshaduzzaman	Bangladesh Nationalist Party	
99	Khulna-1	Prafulla Kumar Mandal	Bangladesh Nationalist Party	
100	Khulna-2	Sheikh Razzak Ali	Bangladesh Nationalist Party	
101	Khulna-3	Ashraf Hossain	Bangladesh Nationalist Party	
102	Khulna-4	M. Nurul Islam	Bangladesh Nationalist Party	
103	Khulna-5	Gazi Abdul Haq	Bangladesh Nationalist Party	
104	Khulna-6	vacant		
105	Shatkhira-1	Habibul Islam Habib	Bangladesh Nationalist Party	
106	Shatkhira-2	Shamsul Haque	Bangladesh Nationalist Party	
107	Shatkhira-3	Ali Ahmed	Bangladesh Nationalist Party	
108	Shatkhira-4	Wazed Ali biswas	Bangladesh Nationalist Party	
109	Shatkhira-5	GM Abdul Haq	Bangladesh Nationalist Party	
110	Barguna-1	Abdur Rahman Khokon	Bangladesh Nationalist Party	
111	Barguna-2	Golam Sarwar Hiru	Bangladesh Nationalist Party	
112	Barguna-3	Abdul Majid Mallick	Bangladesh Nationalist Party	
113	Patuakhali-1	Altaf Hossain Chowdhury	Bangladesh Nationalist Party	
114	Patuakhali-2	Yaqub Ali Sharif	Bangladesh Nationalist Party	
115	Patuakhali-3	Shajahan Khan	Bangladesh Nationalist Party	
116	Patuakhali-4	Mustafizur Rahman	Bangladesh Nationalist Party	
117	Bhola-1	Mosharef Hossain Shahjahan	Bangladesh Nationalist Party	
118	Bhola-2	Nizam Uddin Ahmed	Bangladesh Nationalist Party	
119	Bhola-3	Hafizuddin Ahmed	Bangladesh Nationalist Party	
120	Bhola-4	Nazimuddin Alam	Bangladesh Nationalist Party	
121	Barisal-1	Zahir Uddin Swapan	Bangladesh Nationalist Party	
122	Barisal-2	Syed Moazzem Hossain Alal	Bangladesh Nationalist Party	
123	Barisal-3	Mosharraf Hossain Mongu	Bangladesh Nationalist Party	
124	Barisal-4	Shah M. Abul Hussain	Bangladesh Nationalist Party	
125	Barisal-5	Nasim Biswas	Bangladesh Nationalist Party	
126	Barisal-6	Anwar Hossain Chowdhury	Bangladesh Nationalist Party	
127	Jhalakathi-1	Shahjahan Omar	Bangladesh Nationalist Party	
128	Jhalakathi-2	Gazi Aziz Ferdous	Bangladesh Nationalist Party	
129	Pirojpur-1	Gazi Nuruzzaman Babul	Bangladesh Nationalist Party	
130	Pirojpur-2	Nurul Islam Manzur	Bangladesh Nationalist Party	
131	Pirojpur-3	M. A. Jabbar	Bangladesh Nationalist Party	
132	Pirojpur with Barisal	Syed Shahidul Huque Jamal	Bangladesh Nationalist Party	
133	Tangail-1	Abdus Salam Talukder	Bangladesh Nationalist Party	
134	Tangail-2	Abdus Salam Pintu	Bangladesh Nationalist Party	
135	Tangail-3	Lutfor Rahman Khan Azad	Bangladesh Nationalist Party	
136	Tangail-4	Shajahan Siraj	Bangladesh Nationalist Party	
137	Tangail-5	Mahmudul Hasan	Bangladesh Nationalist Party	
138	Tangail-6	Khandaker Abu Taher	Bangladesh Nationalist Party	
139	Tangail-7	Abul Kalam Azad Siddiqui	Bangladesh Nationalist Party	
140	Tangail-8	Humayun Khan Panni	Bangladesh Nationalist Party	
141	Jamalpur-1	AKM Moinul Haque	Bangladesh Nationalist Party	
142	Jamalpur-2	Sultan Mahmud Babu	Bangladesh Nationalist Party	
143	Jamalpur-3	Abul Hossain	Bangladesh Nationalist Party	
144	Jamalpur-4	vacant		
145	Jamalpur-5	Sirajul Haq	Bangladesh Nationalist Party	
146	Sherpur-1	Nazrul Islam	Bangladesh Nationalist Party	
147	Sherpur-2	Zahed Ali	Bangladesh Nationalist Party	
148	Sherpur-3	Mahmudul Haque Rubel	Bangladesh Nationalist Party	
149	Mymensingh-1	Afzal H. Khan	Bangladesh Nationalist Party	
150	Mymensingh-2	Abul Basar Akand	Bangladesh Nationalist Party	
151	Mymensingh-3	AFM Nazmul Huda	Bangladesh Nationalist Party	
152	Mymensingh-4	AKM Fazlul Haque	Bangladesh Nationalist Party	
153	Mymensingh-5	Abu Reza Fazlul Haque Bablu	Bangladesh Nationalist Party	
154	Mymensingh-6	Shamsuddin Ahmed	Bangladesh Nationalist Party	
155	Mymensingh-7	Mahbub Anam	Bangladesh Nationalist Party	
156	Mymensingh-8	Zainul Abedin	Bangladesh Nationalist Party	
157	Mymensingh-9	Zahurul Islam Khan	Bangladesh Nationalist Party	
158	Mymensingh-10	Fazlur Rahman Sultan	Bangladesh Nationalist Party	
159	Mymensingh-11	Aman Ullah Chowdhury	Bangladesh Nationalist Party	
160	Mymensingh with Netrokona	Mohammad Ali	Bangladesh Nationalist Party	
161	Netrokona-1	Abdul Karim Abbasi	Bangladesh Nationalist Party	
162	Netrokona-2	Abu Abbas	Bangladesh Nationalist Party	
163	Netrokona-3	Nurul Amin Talukdar	Bangladesh Nationalist Party	
164	Netrokona-4	Lutfozzaman Babar	Bangladesh Nationalist Party	
165	Kishoreganj-1	ABM Zahidul Haq	Bangladesh Nationalist Party	
166	Kishoreganj-2	Habibur Rahman Dayal	Bangladesh Nationalist Party	
167	Kishoreganj-3	Masood Helali	Bangladesh Nationalist Party	
168	Kishoreganj-4	Kabira Uddina Ahmed	Bangladesh Nationalist Party	
169	Kishoreganj-5	Imdadul Haque	Bangladesh Nationalist Party	
170	Kishoreganj-6	Aamir Uddin Ahmod	Bangladesh Nationalist Party	
171	Kishoreganj-7	Shafiqul Islam	Bangladesh Nationalist Party	
172	Manikganj-1	Khandaker Delwar Hossain	Bangladesh Nationalist Party	
173	Manikganj-2	Harunur Rashid Khan Monno	Bangladesh Nationalist Party	
174	Manikganj-3	Nizam Uddin Khan	Bangladesh Nationalist Party	
175	Manikganj-4	Shamsul Islam Khan	Bangladesh Nationalist Party	
176	Munshiganj-1	A. Q. M. Badruddoza Chowdhury	Bangladesh Nationalist Party	
177	Munshiganj-2	Muhammad Hamidullah Khan	Bangladesh Nationalist Party	
178	Munshiganj-3	Shamsul Islam	Bangladesh Nationalist Party	
179	Munshiganj-4	Md. Abdul Hai	Bangladesh Nationalist Party	
180	Dhaka-1	Nazmul Huda	Bangladesh Nationalist Party	
181	Dhaka-2	Abdul Mannan	Bangladesh Nationalist Party	
182	Dhaka-3	Amanullah Aman	Bangladesh Nationalist Party	
183	Dhaka-4	Salah Uddin Ahmed	Bangladesh Nationalist Party	
184	Dhaka-5	Mohammad Quamrul Islam	Bangladesh Nationalist Party	
185	Dhaka-6	Mirza Abbas	Bangladesh Nationalist Party	
186	Dhaka-7	Sadeque Hossain Khoka	Bangladesh Nationalist Party	
187	Dhaka-8	Mir Shawkat Ali	Bangladesh Nationalist Party	
188	Dhaka-9	Khandokar Mahbub Uddin Ahmad	Bangladesh Nationalist Party	
189	Dhaka-10	Abdul Mannan	Bangladesh Nationalist Party	
190	Dhaka-11	S. A. Khaleque	Bangladesh Nationalist Party	
191	Dhaka-12	Md. Niamatullah	Bangladesh Nationalist Party	
192	Dhaka-13	Ziaur Rahman Khan	Bangladesh Nationalist Party	
193	Gazipur-1	Chowdhury Tanbir Ahmed Siddiky	Bangladesh Nationalist Party	
194	Gazipur-2	M. A. Mannan	Bangladesh Nationalist Party	
195	Gazipur-3	AKM Fazlul Haque Milon	Bangladesh Nationalist Party	
196	Gazipur-4	ASM Hannan Shah	Bangladesh Nationalist Party	
197	Narsingdi-1	Shamsuddin Ahmed Ishaq	Bangladesh Nationalist Party	
198	Narsingdi-2	Abdul Moyeen Khan	Bangladesh Nationalist Party	
199	Narsingdi-3	Abdul Mannan Bhuiyan	Bangladesh Nationalist Party	
200	Narsingdi-4	Sardar Shakhawat Hossain Bokul	Bangladesh Nationalist Party	
201	Narsingdi-5	Abdul Ali Mridha	Bangladesh Nationalist Party	
202	Narayanganj-1	Abdul Matin Chowdhury	Bangladesh Nationalist Party	
203	Narayanganj-2	Ataur Rahman Khan Angur	Bangladesh Nationalist Party	
204	Narayanganj-3	Rezaul Karim	Bangladesh Nationalist Party	
205	Narayanganj-4	Mohammad Ali	Bangladesh Nationalist Party	
206	Narayanganj-5	Abul Kalam	Bangladesh Nationalist Party	
207	Rajbari-1	Jahanara Begum	Bangladesh Nationalist Party	
208	Rajbari-2	Khandaker Sadrul Amin Habib	Bangladesh Nationalist Party	
209	Faridpur-1	Khandaker Nasirul Islam	Independent	
210	Faridpur-2	Abul Hossain Mia	Bangladesh Nationalist Party	
211	Faridpur-3	Chowdhury Kamal Ibne Yusuf	Bangladesh Nationalist Party	
212	Faridpur-4	Chowdhury Akmal Ibne Yusuf	Bangladesh Nationalist Party	
213	Faridpur-5	Sarwar Jahan Mia	Bangladesh Nationalist Party	
214	Gopalganj-1	Sharfuzzaman Jahangir	Bangladesh Nationalist Party	
215	Gopalganj-2	vacant		
216	Gopalganj-3	Mujibur Rahman Howlader	Bangladesh Nationalist Party	
217	Madaripur-1	Abul Khair Chowdhury	Bangladesh Nationalist Party	
218	Madaripur-2	Qazi Mahabub Ahmed	Bangladesh Nationalist Party	
219	Madaripur-3	Ganesh Chandra Haldar	Bangladesh Nationalist Party	
220	Shariatpur-1	vacant		
221	Shariatpur-2	Khandaker Abdul Jalil	Bangladesh Nationalist Party	
222	Shariatpur-3	Safiqur Rahman Kiran	Bangladesh Nationalist Party	
223	Sunamganj-1	Nozir Hossain	Bangladesh Nationalist Party	
224	Sunamganj-2	Mifta Uddin Chowdhury Rumi	Bangladesh Nationalist Party	
225	Sunamganj-3	Gulzar Ahmed	Bangladesh Nationalist Party	
226	Sunamganj-4	Fazlul Haque Aspia	Bangladesh Nationalist Party	
227	Sunamganj-5	Kalim Uddin Ahmed	Bangladesh Nationalist Party	
228	Sylhet-1	Khandaker Abdul Malik	Bangladesh Nationalist Party	
229	Sylhet-2	Ilias Ali	Bangladesh Nationalist Party	
230	Sylhet-3	Shafi Ahmad Chowdhury	Bangladesh Nationalist Party	
231	Sylhet-4	Saifur Rahman	Bangladesh Nationalist Party	
232	Sylhet-5	Abdul Kahir Chowdhury	Bangladesh Nationalist Party	
233	Sylhet-6	Sharaf Uddin Khashru	Bangladesh Nationalist Party	
234	Moulvibazar-1	Ebadur Rahman Chowdhury	Bangladesh Nationalist Party	
235	Moulvibazar-2	MM Shahin	Bangladesh Nationalist Party	
236	Moulvibazar-3	vacant		
237	Moulvibazar-4	Saifur Rahman	Bangladesh Nationalist Party	
238	Habiganj-1	Sheikh Sujat Mia	Bangladesh Nationalist Party	
239	Habiganj-2	Zakaria Khan Chowdhury	Bangladesh Nationalist Party	
240	Habiganj-3	Atiq Ullah	Bangladesh Nationalist Party	
241	Habiganj-4	Syed Mohammad Faisal	Bangladesh Nationalist Party	
242	Brahmanbaria-1	SM Safi Mahmood	Bangladesh Nationalist Party	
243	Brahmanbaria-2	Ukil Abdul Sattar Bhuiyan	Bangladesh Nationalist Party	
244	Brahmanbaria-3	Haroon Al Rashid	Bangladesh Nationalist Party	
245	Brahmanbaria-4	Mia Abdullah Wazed	Bangladesh Nationalist Party	
246	Brahmanbaria-5	Siddiqur Rahman	Bangladesh Nationalist Party	
247	Brahmanbaria-6	Shahjahan Hawlader Sujan	Bangladesh Nationalist Party	
248	Comilla-1	M. K. Anwar	Bangladesh Nationalist Party	
249	Comilla-2	Khandokar Mosharraf Hossain	Bangladesh Nationalist Party	
250	Comilla-3	Rafiqul Islam Miah	Bangladesh Nationalist Party	
251	Comilla-4	Manjurul Ahsan Munshi	Bangladesh Nationalist Party	
252	Comilla-5	Mujibur Rahman	Bangladesh Nationalist Party	
253	Comilla-6	Khandaker Abdur Rashid	Bangladesh Nationalist Party	
254	Comilla-7	AKM Abu Taher	Bangladesh Nationalist Party	
255	Comilla-8	Akbar Hossain	Bangladesh Nationalist Party	
256	Comilla-9	Amin ur Rashid Yasin	Bangladesh Nationalist Party	
257	Comilla-10	ATM Alamgir	Bangladesh Nationalist Party	
258	Comilla-11	AKM Kamruzzaman	Bangladesh Nationalist Party	
259	Comilla-12	Shams suddin Ahmed	Bangladesh Nationalist Party	
260	Chandpur-1	Abul Hasnat	Bangladesh Nationalist Party	
261	Chandpur-2	Md. Nurul Huda	Bangladesh Nationalist Party	
262	Chandpur-3	Alam Khan	Bangladesh Nationalist Party	
263	Chandpur-4	Mohammad Abdullah	Bangladesh Nationalist Party	
264	Chandpur-5	M. A. Matin	Bangladesh Nationalist Party	
265	Chandpur-6	Alamgir Hyder Khan	Bangladesh Nationalist Party	
266	Feni-1	Khaleda Zia	Bangladesh Nationalist Party	
267	Feni-2	vacant		
268	Feni-3	Mahbubul Alam Tara	Bangladesh Nationalist Party	
269	Noakhali-1	Zainul Abdin Farroque	Bangladesh Nationalist Party	
270	Noakhali-2	Barkat Ullah Bulu	Bangladesh Nationalist Party	
271	Noakhali-3	Salah Uddin Kamran	Bangladesh Nationalist Party	
272	Noakhali-4	Md. Shahjahan	Bangladesh Nationalist Party	
273	Noakhali-5	ASM Enamul Haque	Bangladesh Nationalist Party	
274	Noakhali-6	Mohammad Fazlul Azim	Bangladesh Nationalist Party	
275	Laxmipur-1	Nazim Uddin Ahmed	Bangladesh Nationalist Party	
276	Laxmipur-2	Abul Khair Bhuiyan	Bangladesh Nationalist Party	
277	Laxmipur-3	Nurul Amin Bhuiyan	Bangladesh Nationalist Party	
278	Laxmipur-4	Abdur Rab Chowdhury	Bangladesh Nationalist Party	
279	Chittagong-1	Obaidul Huq Khandaker	Bangladesh Nationalist Party	
280	Chittagong-2	L. K. Siddiqi	Bangladesh Nationalist Party	
281	Chittagong-3	Mostafa Kamal Pasha	Bangladesh Nationalist Party	
282	Chittagong-4	Syed Nazibul Bashar Maizvandary	Bangladesh Nationalist Party	
283	Chittagong-5	Syed Wahidul Alam	Bangladesh Nationalist Party	
284	Chittagong-6	Golam Akbar Khandaker	Bangladesh Nationalist Party	
285	Chittagong-7	Nurul Alam	Bangladesh Nationalist Party	
286	Chittagong-8	Amir Khasru Mahmud Chowdhury	Bangladesh Nationalist Party	
287	Chittagong-9	Abdullah Al Noman	Bangladesh Nationalist Party	
288	Chittagong-10	Morshed Khan	Bangladesh Nationalist Party	
289	Chittagong-11	Md. Shah Newaz Chowdhury	Bangladesh Nationalist Party	
290	Chittagong-12	Sarwar Jamal Nizam	Bangladesh Nationalist Party	
291	Chittagong-13	vacant		
292	Chittagong-14	Oli Ahmad	Bangladesh Nationalist Party	
293	Chittagong-15	Jafrul Islam Chowdhury	Bangladesh Nationalist Party	
294	Cox's Bazar-1	Salah Uddin Ahmed	Bangladesh Nationalist Party	
295	Cox's Bazar-2	ATM Nurul Bashar Chowdhury	Bangladesh Nationalist Party	
296	Cox's Bazar-3	Mohammad Khalequzzaman	Bangladesh Nationalist Party	
297	Cox's Bazar-4	Shahjahan Chowdhury	Bangladesh Nationalist Party	
298	Hill Khagrachari	Wadud Bhuiyan	Bangladesh Nationalist Party	
299	Hill Rangamati	Parijat Kusum Chakma	Bangladesh Nationalist Party	
300	Hill Bandarban	Saching Prue Jerry	Bangladesh Nationalist Party	

=== Members of the Reserved Women's Seat ===
Sl. No.	Parliamentarian	Seat No.	Party	Notes
01	Shamsunnahar Mahmud	Seat-01	Bangladesh Nationalist Party	
02	Rebeka Mahmoud	Seat-02	Bangladesh Nationalist Party	
03	Shahida Rahman Jotsna	Seat-03	Bangladesh Nationalist Party	
04	Mamtaz Begum	Seat-04	Bangladesh Nationalist Party	
05	Raushan Elahi	Seat-05	Bangladesh Nationalist Party	
06	Lutfun Nesa Hossain	Seat-06	Bangladesh Nationalist Party	
07	Sufia Begum	Seat-07	Bangladesh Nationalist Party	
08	Begum Rosy Kabir	Seat-08	Bangladesh Nationalist Party	
09	Momtaz Kabir	Seat-09	Bangladesh Nationalist Party	
10	Farida Rahman	Seat-10	Bangladesh Nationalist Party	
11	Syeda Nargis Ali	Seat-11	Bangladesh Nationalist Party	
12	Raushan Ara Hena	Seat-12	Bangladesh Nationalist Party	
13	Selima Rahman	Seat-13	Bangladesh Nationalist Party	
14	Khaleda Panna	Seat-14	Bangladesh Nationalist Party	
15	Rahima Khandaker	Seat-15	Bangladesh Nationalist Party	
16	Nurjahan Yasmin	Seat-16	Bangladesh Nationalist Party	
17	Laila Begum	Seat-17	Bangladesh Nationalist Party	
18	Shirin Sultana	Seat-18	Bangladesh Nationalist Party	
19	Sarwari Rahman	Seat-29	Bangladesh Nationalist Party	
20	KJ Hamida Khanam	Seat-20	Bangladesh Nationalist Party	
21	Shamsunnahar Khwaja Ahsanullah	Seat-21	Bangladesh Nationalist Party	
22	Yasmin Haque	Seat-22	Bangladesh Nationalist Party	
23	Selina Rauf Chowdhury	Seat-23	Bangladesh Nationalist Party	
24	Begum Fatema Chowdhury Paru	Seat-24	Bangladesh Nationalist Party	
25	Khaleda Rabbani	Seat-25	Bangladesh Nationalist Party	
26	Ferdous Akter Wahida	Seat-26	Bangladesh Nationalist Party	
27	Rabeya Chowdhury	Seat-27	Bangladesh Nationalist Party	
28	Halima Khatun	Seat-28	Bangladesh Nationalist Party	
29	Nuri Ara Safa	Seat-29	Bangladesh Nationalist Party	
30	Mamatching Marma	Seat-30	Bangladesh Nationalist Party	
