= M. A. Bari =

M. A. Bari may refer to

- M. A. Bari (Khulna-6 politician)
- M. A. Bari (Sherpur-3 politician)
