= A. B. Tajul Islam =

Bangladeshi politician

AB Tajul Islam

Minister of Liberation War Affairs
- In office 6 January 2009 – 21 November 2013
- Prime Minister: Sheikh Hasina
- Preceded by: M. A. Matin
- Succeeded by: Shajahan Khan

Member of the Bangladesh Parliament for Brahmanbaria-6
- In office 25 January 2009 – 6 August 2024
- Preceded by: Abdul Khaleque
- Succeeded by: Zonayed Saki
- In office 11 March 1996 – July 2001
- Preceded by: Shahjahan Hawlader Sujan

Personal details
- Born: 5 May 1951 (age 75) Brahmanbaria, East Bengal, Pakistan
- Party: Bangladesh Awami League
- Education: University of Dhaka

Military service
- Allegiance: Bangladesh
- Branch/service: Bangladesh Army; Bangladesh Rifles
- Years of service: 1975 - 1984
- Rank: Captain
- Unit: East Bengal Regiment
- Commands: Adjutant of 6th Rifles Battalion; Company Commander of 3rd East Bengal Regiment
- Battles/wars: Bangladesh Liberation War

Ahmed Bahadur Tajul Islam (born 5 May 1951) is a Bangladesh Awami League politician who served as the state minister of Liberation War Affairs and as a Jatiya Sangsad member representing the Brahmanbaria-6 constituency during 2009–2024 and 1996–2001. He is a retired Bangladesh Army captain.

== Early life ==
Tajul Islam graduated in economics from the University of Dhaka. He later joined the Bangladesh Army.

== Career ==
Islam was elected to parliament in 1996, 2008, and 2014 from Brahmanbaria-6 as a candidate of the Bangladesh Awami League. He served as the state minister for liberation war affairs. He is the chairman of the Parliamentary Standing Committee on the Liberation War Ministry.

=== Controversy ===
According to a probe by the Anti-Corruption Commission, Islam abused his powers as state minister by providing Freedom Fighter Certificates to five government employees without following proper protocol. According to the commission, three government officials managed to become leaders of the Muktijoddha Sangsad illegally through their political and family connections to Tajul Islam.

== Personal life ==
Islam is married to Hasu Islam and has a daughter named Shama.
