= A. K. M. Fazlul Haque =

Bangladeshi politician (born 1949)

Member of Parliament of Sherpur-3
- In office 2008–2013
- Preceded by: Mahmudul Haque Rubel
- Succeeded by: A. K. M. Fazlul Haque
- In office 2014–2018
- Preceded by: A. K. M. Fazlul Haque
- Succeeded by: A. K. M. Fazlul Haque
- In office 2019–2023
- Preceded by: A. K. M. Fazlul Haque
- Succeeded by: A.D.M Shahidul Islam

Personal details
- Born: 16 January 1949 (age 77)
- Party: Awami League

A. K. M. Fazlul Haque (এ, কে, এম, ফজলুল হক; born 16 January 1949) is an Awami League politician and the former Member of Parliament from Sherpur-3.

== Early life ==
Haque was born on 16 January 1949. He studied engineering in his undergrad.

== Career ==
Haque is a retired civil servant.

Haque was elected to Parliament in 2008 from Sherpur-3 as a candidate of Bangladesh Awami League. He received 106,631 votes while his nearest rival Mahmudul Haque Rubel of the Bangladesh Nationalist Party received 65,753 votes. Haque is the younger brother of Rubel's father, Serajul Haque, who was a former member of parliament who died in 1994.

Haque was re-elected to Parliament in December 2013 from Sherpur-3 as a candidate of the Awami League. He received 96,234 votes while his nearest rival, Md. Hedayetul Islam, an independent candidate, received 8548 votes. The election was boycotted by the Bangladesh Nationalist Party.

Haque was re-elected to Parliament in 2018 from Sherpur-3 as a candidate of the Awami League. He received 251,936 votes while his nearest rival, Md. Hedayetul Islam, an independent candidate, received 12,491 votes. He was a Member of the Parliamentary Standing Committee on Water Resources Ministry.

Haque did not receive the Awami League nomination in 2023.
