= Taslima Akhter =

Bangladeshi activist and photographer (born 1974)

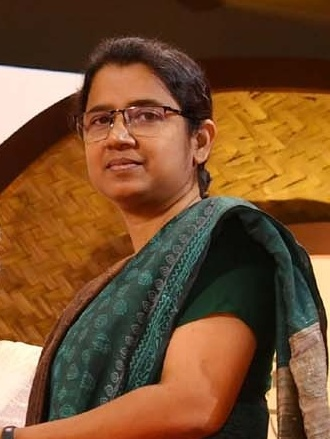
- Akhter receiving Begum Rokeya Padak (2024)
- Born: 1974 (age 51–52); Dhaka, Bangladesh
- Education: University of Dhaka
- Occupations: Activist and photographer
- Notable work: Final Embrace
- Spouse: Zonayed Saki
- Website: taslimaakhter.com

Taslima Akhter (born 1974) is a Bangladeshi activist and photographer. She is a graduate of Dhaka University, as well as the photography school Pathshala. She is a member of several activist organizations. While documenting the Rana Plaza collapse in 2013, she took a photograph of a woman and a man who had died in each other's arms, which became emblematic of the incident.

== Biography ==
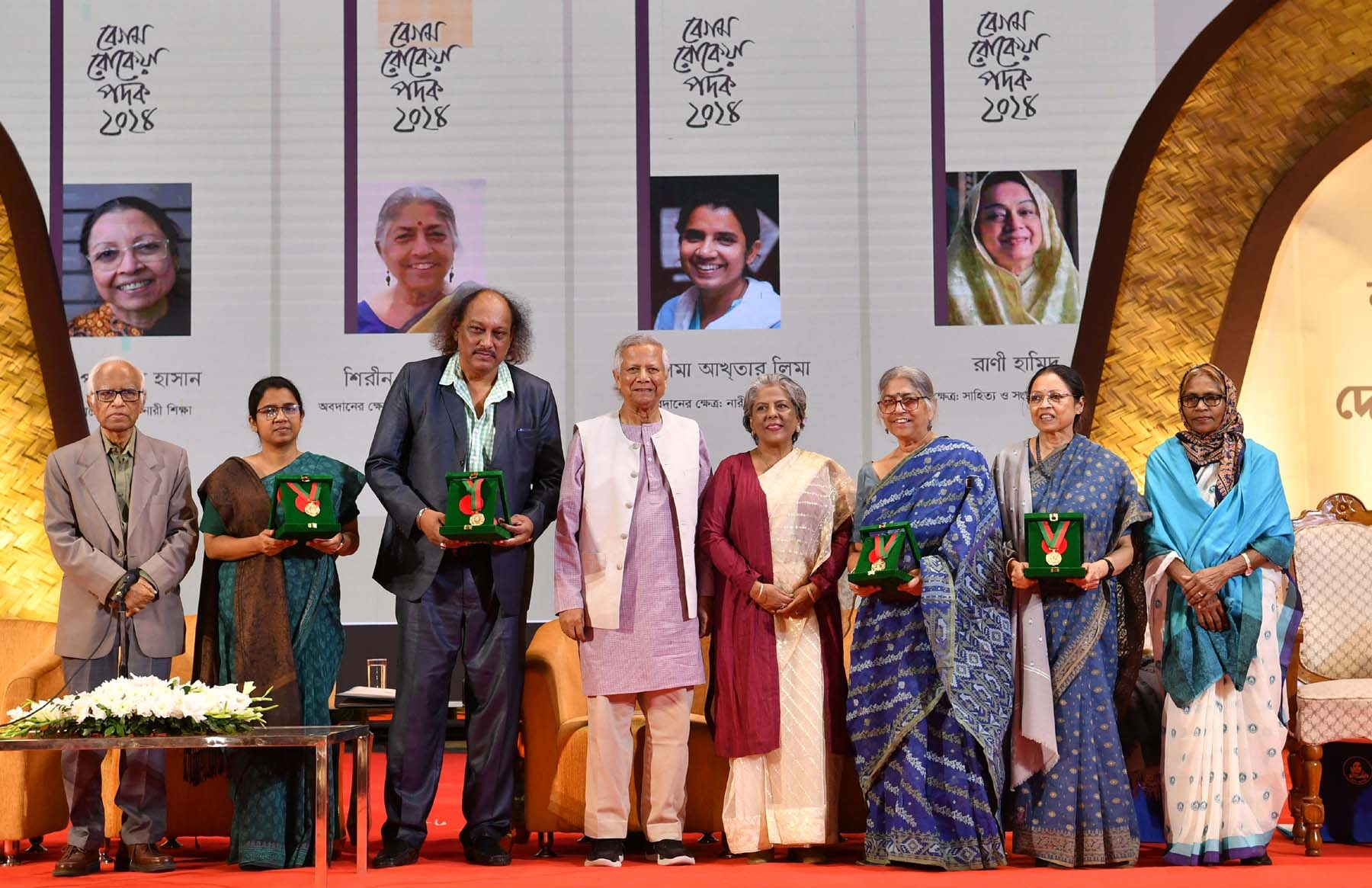
Akhter receiving 2024 Begum Rokeya Padak

Taslima Akhter was born in Dhaka, Bangladesh, in 1974. Akhter is a graduate of Dhaka University, with Master's degrees in science and in public administration. While at the university, she was a member of the Bangladesh Student's Federation. She went on the study photojournalism at Pathshala, a photography school in Dhaka, which was founded by Shahidul Alam. She tries to bring attention to social and environmental issues through her photography, driven partly by her experience during the 2008 political emergency in Bangladesh. Akhter was among those who documented the fire at Tasreen Garments factory in 2012. Akhter has worked on projects in several cities in Bangladesh, as well as in Nandigram in India. Her work led to her receiving the Magnum Foundation scholarship in 2010. Her work has been exhibited in several countries. She is married to Zonayed Saki.

Akhter is a member of the women's organization Biplobi Nari Sanghati and the Emancipatory Social Democratic activist group Gana Sanghati Andolan. She is also a coordinator of the Garments Sramik Sangathan (garment worker's union). In addition, she teaches at Pathshala. Akhter's politics have an influence on her photography.

== "Final Embrace" ==
Following the Rana Plaza collapse in April 2013, Akhter and other photographers from Pathshala tried to document the lives of people who had died there, while also taking part in the rescue effort. These stories were later published as a book, titled Chobbish April: Hazaar Praner Chitkar (24 April: outcries of a thousand souls). The publication was related to Akhter's work with the garment workers' union. During this process, Akhter photographed a man and woman who had died in the building collapse, locked in an embrace with each other. Akhter was unable to identify the subjects of the photograph despite much effort. This photograph, known variously as the "Eternal Embrace", the "Death of A Thousand Dreams", and the "Final Embrace", received widespread critical attention and multiple awards, and became emblematic of the incident, in which 1100 people died. The photograph also received widespread attention online, and led to petitions to clothing companies demanding higher minimum wages and improved safety standards. Akhter described herself as being haunted by the photograph.

== Awards ==
- Third prize for documentary photography at the Julia Margaret Cameron Award, for her documentary The Life and Struggle of Garment Workers (2010).
- Time magazine's "Top 10 Photos of 2013" for "Final Embrace" (2013).
- Best Photographer Award from the 5th Dali International Photography Exhibition in China (2013).
- Third prize for single photos in the "Spot News" category, World Press Photo competition, 2014.
- Begum Rokeya Padak (2024).
