= Asma Khatun =

Bangladeshi politician (1934/1935–2025)

Hafiza Asma Khatun

Secretary, Women's Wing – Bangladesh Jamaat-e-Islami

Member of Parliament for Reserved Seat 23 (Women)
- In office 1991–1995
- Succeeded by: Selina Rouf Chowdhury

Personal details
- Born: 1934 or 1935
- Died: 20 January 2025 (aged 90)
- Party: Bangladesh Jamaat-e-Islami

Hafiza Asma Khatun (1934 or 1935 – 20 January 2025) was a Bangladeshi politician affiliated with Jamaat-e-Islami, who served as a Member of Parliament in a reserved seat for women. She also served as the Secretary of the Women's Wing of Bangladesh Jamaat-e-Islami for an extended period.

Khatun was elected to parliament from reserved seat as a Bangladesh Nationalist Party candidate in 1991.

Khatun died on 20 January 2025, at the age of 90.
