= Borhan Uddin Ahmed =

Bangladeshi politician

Member of Bangladesh Parliament
- In office 1973–1979
- Succeeded by: Shamsul Haque

Personal details
- Political party: Bangladesh Awami League

Borhan Uddin Ahmed is a Bangladesh Awami League politician and a former member of parliament for Dhaka-11.

== Career ==
Ahmed was elected to parliament from Dhaka-11 as a Bangladesh Awami League candidate in 1971.
