= Sahidur Rahman =

Bangladeshi politician

- শহীদুর রহমান

Member of Bangladesh Parliament
- In office 1986–1988
- Preceded by: The seat started
- Succeeded by: A. T. M. Wali Ashraf

Personal details
- Party: Jatiya Party (Ershad)

Sahidur Rahman is a Jatiya Party (Ershad) politician and a former member of parliament for Brahmanbaria-6.

== Career ==
Rahman was elected to parliament from Brahmanbaria-6 as an independent candidate in 1986.
