= Ganosanhati Andolan =

Political party in Bangladesh

Ganosanhati Andolan গণসংহতি আন্দোলন
- Abbreviation: GSA
- Chief Coordinator: Dewan Abdur Rashid Nilu
- Executive Coordinator: Abul Hasan Rubel
- Founded: 29 August 2002
- Registered: 17 September 2024
- Headquarters: 306-307 Rose View Plaza, 185, Bir Uttom CR Dutt Road, Hatirpool, Dhaka
- Student wing: Students Federation of Bangladesh
- Ideology: Egalitarianism
- Political position: Left-wing
- National affiliation: Ganatantra Manch
- Colors: Red; Black
- Slogan: পরিবর্তন সম্ভব! পরিবর্তন চাই! ("Change is possible, change is wanted")
- Bangladesh Parliament: 1 / 350

Election symbol
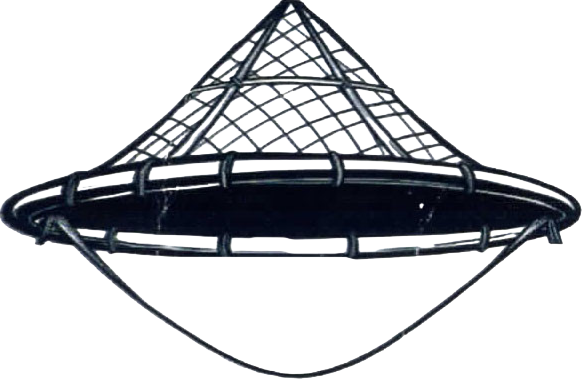
- Mathal

Party flag

Website
- ganosamhati.com

Ganosanhati Andolan (Bengali: গণসংহতি আন্দোলন, lit. 'Mass Solidarity Movement') is a political party in Bangladesh. The party was launched on 29 August 2002, with a call for "people to build their own political power".

== History ==
On 29 August 2002, organizations such as Bangladesh Student Federation, Bangladesh Multi-functional Labor and Hawker Association, Women Solidarity, Bangladesh Garment Workers Solidarity, Pratibesh Andolan and Bangladesh Farmer-Labor Solidarity united to form Ganasanhati Andolan. On 27–29 November 2016, Ganasanhati Andolan's 3rd national representative conference was held, where Zonayed Saki was appointed as the chief coordinator and Advocate Abd Salam as the executive coordinator of the conference. On 29–31 October 2021, its 4th national representative conference was held, where Zonayed Saki was re-elected as the chief coordinator and Abul Hasan Rubel was elected as the executive coordinator and the 2nd central executive committee of the party was formed.

Ganasanhati Andolan took part in the July Revolution, which successfully deposed Sheikh Hasina from power.

== Ideology ==
Ganasanhati Andolan's ideology is mainly based on 'people's politics', promulgated by Abdul Hamid Khan Bhasani. It claims to ideologically struggle with the rights of life and nature, the struggle for all the oppressed-deprived-oppressed on the basis of existing power relations and legal system, property relations and economic system and religion-caste-gender identity. Its political agenda is to continue the struggle for a more egalitarian society through the establishment of a "democratic state and political system", suitable for the rights and power of the masses and the establishment of social equality, human dignity, and social justice for all citizens. The party states to represent the interests of the active masses in Bangladesh.

== Electoral performance ==
In the 2015 Dhaka North City Corporation election, Zonayed Saki, the chief coordinator of the party, ran for the post of mayor but defeated. Later, he participated in the 2018 Bangladeshi general election from Dhaka-12 constituency but he was again defeated. In 2026 general election, Saki participated from Brahmanbaria-6 in alignment with the Bangladesh Nationalist Party (BNP) and won the election. He is the only elected leftist MP of the current Bangladeshi parliament.

=== Jatiya Sangsad elections ===
Election year	Party leader	Votes	% of Percentage	Seats	+/–	Position	Outcome	Ref.
2026	Zonayed Saki	TBD	0.14%	1 / 300	▲1	▲TBD	Coalition government	

== Notable members ==
- Zonayed Saki
- Taslima Akhter
