= Khandakar Mohammad Khurram =

Bangladeshi politician

Member of Bangladesh Parliament

Personal details
- Party: Jatiya Samajtantrik Dal (Siraj)

Khandakar Mohammad Khurram was a Jatiya Samajtantrik Dal (Siraj) politician and a former member of parliament for Sherpur-3, Bangladesh.

== Career ==
Khurram was elected to parliament from Sherpur-3 as a Jatiya Samajtantrik Dal (Siraj) candidate in 1986.

== Death ==
Khurram died in 2018.
