= Mohammed Fahim Chowdhury =

Bangladeshi politician

Mohammad Fahim Chowdhury
- মোহাম্মদ ফাহিম চৌধুরী

Member of the Bangladesh Parliament for Sherpur-2
- Incumbent
- Assumed office 17 February 2026
- Preceded by: Matia Chowdhury

Personal details
- Born: July 5, 1978 (age 48)q Nakla Upazila, Sherpur District
- Party: Bangladesh Nationalist Party

Mohammad Fahim Chowdhury is a Bangladeshi politician of the Bangladesh Nationalist Party. He is currently serving as a member of parliament from Sherpur-2.

== Early life ==
Chowdhury was born on 5 August 1978 in Nakla Upazila in Sherpur District.
