= Md Wakil Uddin =

Bangladesh politician

Md. Wakil Uddin
- মোহাম্মদ ওয়াকিল উদ্দিন

Member of the Bangladesh Parliament for Dhaka-11
- In office 30 January 2024 – 6 August 2024
- Preceded by: AKM Rahmatullah
- Succeeded by: Nahid Islam

Personal details
- Born: 2 July 1954 (age 71) Baridhara, Dhaka

Wakil Uddin (born 2 July 1954) is a Bangladeshi businessman, Awami League politician and a former Jatiya Sangsad member representing the Dhaka-11 constituency. He is presently the Vice President of Dhaka Mohanagar North Awami League.

== Early life ==
Uddin was born on 2 July 1954 in Baridhara, Dhaka. He fought in the Bangladesh Liberation War in 1971.

== Career ==
Uddin is the managing director of Swadesh Properties Limited and Swadesh Global Media Limited. He is a director of HURDCO International School and Swadesh Land Developers Limited.

Uddin is a director and former chairman of Mutual Trust Bank. He is the chairman of Baridhara Corporation Limited, Baridhara Agro and Food Processing Limited, and Swadesh Pratidin.

Uddin was elected to parliament on 30 January 2024.
