= Abdus Salam (Sherpur politician) =

Bangladeshi politician

Member of the Bangladesh Parliament for Sherpur-2
- In office 1986–1991
- Preceded by: Position created
- Succeeded by: Matia Chowdhury

Personal details
- Born: 1942 Sherpur, Bengal Province, British India
- Died: 17 March 2011 (aged 68–69) Sherpur, Bangladesh
- Party: Jatiya Party (Ershad)

Abdus Salam (1942 – 17 March 2011) was a Jatiya Party politician and a former member of parliament of the then Jamalpur-7 and Sherpur-2 constituencies.

== Early life ==
Abdus Salam was born 1942 in Sherpur.

== Career ==
Abdus Salam started teaching in Sunamganj and Ashek Mahmud College in Jamalpur. He was the Deputy Minister of Home Affairs during the tenure of President Ziaur Rahman and Sattar, and the Minister of Agriculture during the tenure of Hussain Muhammad Ershad in 1986.

He was elected to parliament from the then Jamalpur-7 as a Bangladesh Nationalist Party candidate in 1979. He was elected to parliament from Sherpur-2 as a Jatiya Party candidate in 1986 and 1988.

== Death ==
Salam died on 17 March 2011.
