= Harun Rashid Mollah =

Bangladeshi politician

Member of Bangladesh Parliament
- In office 27 February 1991 – 24 November 1992
- Preceded by: S. A. Khaleque
- Succeeded by: Syed Muhammad Moshin
- Constituency: Dhaka-11

Personal details
- Died: 24 November 1992
- Party: Bangladesh Nationalist Party
- Children: Elias Uddin Mollah

Harun Rashid Mollah was a Bangladesh Nationalist Party politician and a member of parliament for Dhaka-11.

== Career ==
Mollah was initially involved with Awami League politics with Sheikh Mujibur Rahman and was elected chairman of Mirpur municipality many times. He vied for the Awami League nomination from Dhaka-11 but it was given to Kamal Hossain instead. Due to this he contested the elections as a Bangladesh Nationalist Party candidate and was elected to parliament from Dhaka-11 as a BNP candidate in 1991. Kalshi flyover was named after Harun Mollah due to his glorious contribution to the 1971 Liberation War and all the democratic and progressive movements of the country. Harun Mollah Degree College, Harun Mollah Shorok a road starting from Mirpur 10 roundabout and ends at Mirpur 12 bus stand and Harun Mollah Eid-Gah Maidan are named after him.

== Death ==
Mollah died on 24 November 1992.
