= A.D.M Shahidul Islam =

Bangladeshi politician

ADM Shahidul Islam

Member of the Bangladesh Parliament for Sherpur-3
- In office 30 January 2024 – 6 August 2024
- Preceded by: A. K. M. Fazlul Haque
- Succeeded by: Mahmudul Haque Rubel

Personal details
- Born: 31 December 1976 (age 49)
- Party: Bangladesh Awami League

A.D.M Shahidul Islam (born 31 December 1976) is a Bangladesh Awami League politician and a former Jatiya Sangsad member representing the Sherpur-3 constituency in 2024.

== Career ==
Islam is a former chairman of Kharia Kazirchar Union.

Islam was elected to parliament from Sherpur-3 as an Awami League candidate on 7 January 2024.
