= Shahida Rahman Josna =

Hira

- সাহিদা রহমান জোৎস্না
- In office 19 March 1996 – 30 March 1996
- Preceded by: Rebecca Mahmoud
- Succeeded by: Shahnaz Sardar

Personal details
- Born: Rangpur
- Party: Bangladesh Nationalist Party

Shahida Rahman Josna is a Bangladesh Nationalist Party politician from Rangpur District, who was a Member of Parliament for the reserved women's seat.

== Early life ==
Josna was born in Rangpur District.

== Career ==
Josna is a member of the National Executive Committee of Bangladesh Nationalist Party and the president of the Rangpur District unit of Jatiyatabadi Mohila Dal. She was a Member of Parliament nominated by the Bangladesh Nationalist Party from the women's seat 3 of the Sixth Jatiya Sangshad.
