= A. T. M. Wali Ashraf =

Bangladeshi politician

A. T. M. Walie Ashraf

Member of Bangladesh Parliament
- In office 1988–1994
- Preceded by: Sahidur Rahman
- Succeeded by: Shahjahan Hawlader Sujan
- Constituency: Brahmanbaria 6

Personal details
- Born: September 8, 1937 Domrakandi, Bancharampur, Brahmanbaria
- Died: November 19, 1994 (aged 57) Dhaka, Bangladesh CMH Hospital, Dhaka
- Party: Bangladesh Nationalist Party
- Spouse: Rebeka Walie m. 1965
- Children: Raiqah, Mouli, Rudra

A. T. M. Walie Ashraf (8 September 1937 – 19 November 1994) was a politician from the Bangladesh Nationalist Party and a member of parliament for Brahmanbaria-6.

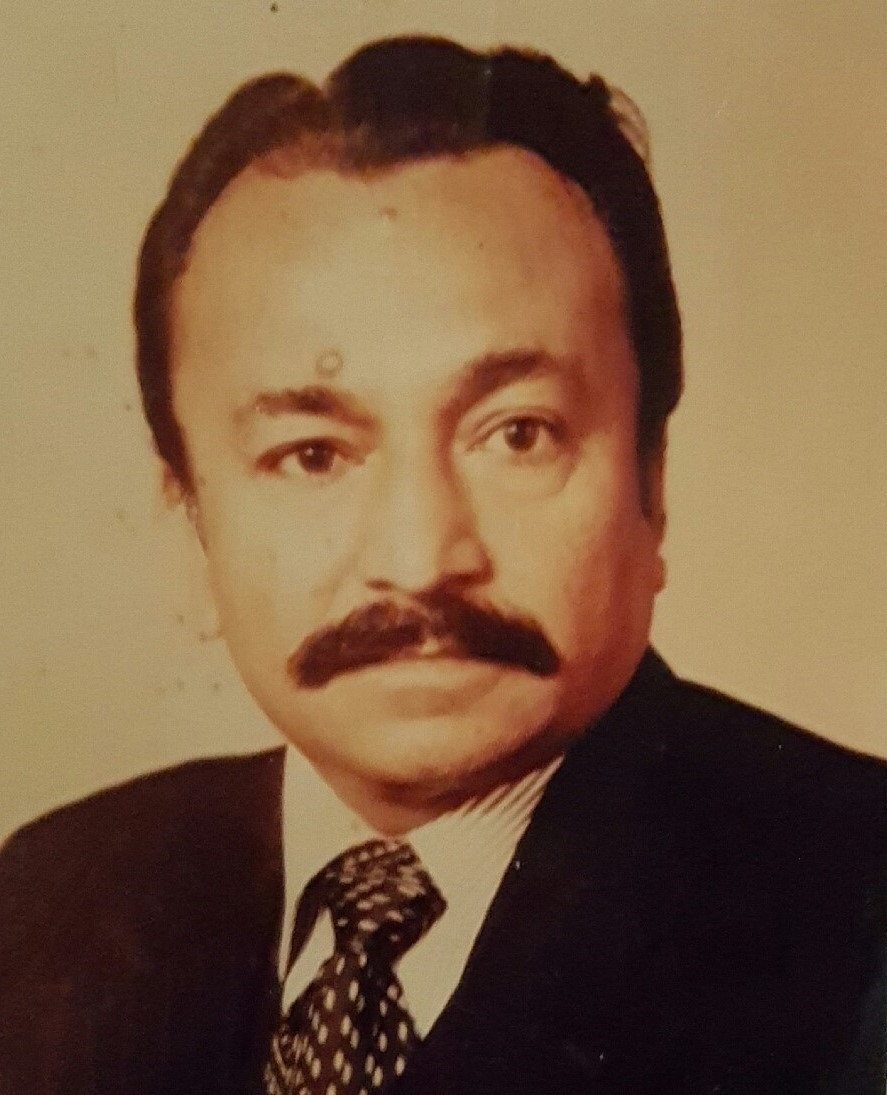

Born on 8 September 1937 in the village of Domrakandi, Bancharampur, Brahmanbaria, Ashraf was the second of eight children and the oldest son. His father, Alhaj Mohammad Atiq Ullah, worked for the Railways Ministry and was initially based in Kolkata. His mother, Alhaj Noorjahan Begum, was the daughter of the local zamindar. Additionally, his parents had four other children who died at birth.

Ashraf was reportedly an energetic child who possessed leadership qualities, which were quickly recognized by his maternal uncle, Dr. Shamsul Alam of Gouripur, during his visits to his sister's house. Alam's devotion to education and civic reform had a lasting influence on Ashraf's life and philosophy. At the age of 7, Ashraf left his parents' home to live with his uncle. When he turned 16, he graduated from school and went on to study at B.M. College in Barisal. He was later admitted to the University of Dhaka in the Department of Bengali.

== Education ==
B.A. (Hons.) 1961 and M.A. 1962 from the University of Dacca.

== Student Politics ==
- Ashraf was imprisoned during the Ayub regime for taking part in the Democratic movement of 1962.
- He toured West Pakistan as Leader of the erstwhile East Pakistan students delegation in late 1962.
- He represented Pakistan at the UNESCO sponsored World Youth Council held at Linz, Austria in 1963.
- He joined journalism, as a Staff Reporter in the now-defunct Daily Jehad in 1963.
- In late December 1966, ATM Walie Ashraf arrived in England and joined the Hon'ble Society of Lincoln's Inn to study Bar but abandoned it after the Liberation War.

== Pak Students Work Camp Association/Editor of the Mission (monthly bulletin) ==
At Dhaka University, Ashraf served as the Secretary General of the Pakistan Students Work Camp Association from 1958 to 1963 with Professor Nazmul Karim as the first President. ATM Walie Ashraf was the editor of The Mission, the monthly bulletin of the association. He was a student of S.M. Hall at Dhaka University.

== Faqir (Beggars) Samity ==
Together with young Bengali students, Ashraf led a socio-cultural group that visited the residences of Bengali expatriates in England, singing traditional songs. The group's name was derived from their practice of visiting members' homes and singing familiar songs of Bangladeshi beggars. These songs included phrases like "Shono Momin Musalmana, Kari Aami Nibedana, E Dunia Fana Habe Jene Janona" (Listen, O faithful Muslims, you know it but do not admit that this world will be destroyed one day). Another song they sang was "Diner Nabi Mastofae, Rasta Diya Haitta Jae, Rastai Chhila Harin Bandha Gachher-i Tolai" (The great Prophet of the true religion walked down the road beside which was a tree to which a deer was tied with a rope). When group members visited a home and sang these beggars' songs, the household was expected to host a feast of fine rice cooked in clarified butter and lamb curry the following weekend. This tradition helped foster close camaraderie and a sense of fellowship among the group members.

== Janomot First Bengali Newsweekly ==
He played a pivotal role in London during the Bangladesh Independence War in 1971. His Bengali newsweekly, Janomot (established in London on 21 February 1969 and recognized as the first Bengali newspaper printed outside Bangladesh), and the first paper for Ethnic Minorities in the UK. The paper motivated Bengalis living in London to fight for independence. A. T. M. Wali Ashraf was the founding editor of Janomot, which began in his home at 2 Temperley Road, Balham, London. The Janomot office was later relocated to Unit 2, 20b Spelman Street, Spitalfields & Bangla Town, London E1 5LQ.

His residence at 2 Temperley Road, London, was also the birthplace of the first Bangladesh Biman Office (Bangladesh Airlines) in the city.

In the 1960s and 70s, A. T. M. Wali Ashraf, Zakaria Ahmed, and other Bengalis instilled fear in the Pakistani rulers from London. He spoke about the independence of Bangladesh while sitting in London and occupied the Pakistan High Commission building to announce the independence of Bengal. He was the first to take the initiative to save Bangabandhu Sheikh Mujibur Rahman from the Agartala conspiracy case. In response to their strong agitation and resistance, Pakistan President Field Marshal Ayub Khan, who was visiting London, escaped through the back door of the hotel.

== Bangladesh Students Action Committee ==
In London, the Bangladesh Students Action Committee played a pivotal role in garnering support from both the Bengali expatriate community and the international community. Mohammad Hossain Monju served as the convener of the Students' Action Committee for the War of Liberation in the UK. Active members of the action committee included Khondakar Mosharraf Hossain, Nazrul Islam, Walie Ashraf, Sultan Mahmud Sharif, Shafiuddin Mahmud Bulbul, Shamsuddin Choudhury Manik (who later became a justice of the Supreme Court of Bangladesh), Ziauddin Mahmud, Lutfur Rahman Shahjahan, Akhter Imam, and Kamrul Islam. The committee played a crucial role in inspiring and coordinating the activities of expatriate Bangladeshis to strengthen liberation publicity and lobbying efforts in the West, especially in Europe.

== Career ==
- A. T. M. Walie Ashraf was a Bengali newscaster on BBC Bangla World Service in London in 1969.
- In late 1969, A. T. M. Walie Ashraf served as a Member of the five-men relief committee formed in London after the 1970 cyclone with Rt. Hon'ble Mr. Peter Shore (former British Minister), Lord Mayor of London, Bishop Huddlestone and Barrister L.R. Shahjahan and others.
- In 1971, during the Liberation War, A. T. M. Walie Ashraf during the Liberation War, was a founder member of the Bangladesh Students Action Committee in Great Britain.
- He joined the World Peace Conference in Budapest, Hungary in 1971 as a Member of the four men Bangladesh delegation led by former Foreign Minister Mr. A. Samad.
- He addressed a Press Conference in 1971 on the exiled Bangladesh's foreign policy in the Hague as personal representative of Mr. Justice Abu Sayeed Chowdhury.
- In early December 1971 he went to Calcutta to join the armed struggle of the Liberation War.
- On the 22nd December 1971, he accompanied the exiled Government on their return to Dacca, Bangladesh.
- He became the Governing Body Member of The Bancharampur Degree College in Brahmanbaria.
- On the 26th March 1973, he started simultaneous publication of the weekly Janomot from Dacca which was closed down by the Mujib Government in September 1974.
- On the 4th August 1975, he was stripped of the Bangladesh citizenship by Mujib Government which was later restored after the political change of 15th August 1975.
- In November 1976, he returned to Dacca and joined Democratic League as a Member of the Central Committee; and later in August 1977 was elected Office Secretary of the now banned Democratic League Central Committee.
- In 1976, he was unanimously elected Managing Committee Chairman of the Bangladesh Centre in London.
- He was first elected to parliament from Brahmanbaria-6 as an independent member in 1988.
- A. T. M. Walie Ashraf was subsequently elected to parliament from Brahmanbaria-6 as a candidate of the Bangladesh Nationalist Party in 1991.
- A. T. M. Walie Ashraf attended the World Assembly for Peace held in Budapest as a member of the official delegation led by M. A. Samad, an elected member of the National Assembly and Roving Ambassador for the Republic of Bangladesh. The delegation also included Dewan Mahbub Ali, Joint Secretary of the National Awami Party, and Dr. Sarwar Ali.
- Khandaker Mosharraf Hossain and Nazrul Islam went to Holland at the invitation of the Friends of Bangladesh to attend a press conference. Walie Ashraf also attended the conference as the representative of Justice Abu Sayeed Chowdhury. Together, they formed the Europa Committee and visited Belgium to seek support for Bangladesh.
