= Zonayed Saki =

Bangladeshi politician

- জোনায়েদ সাকি
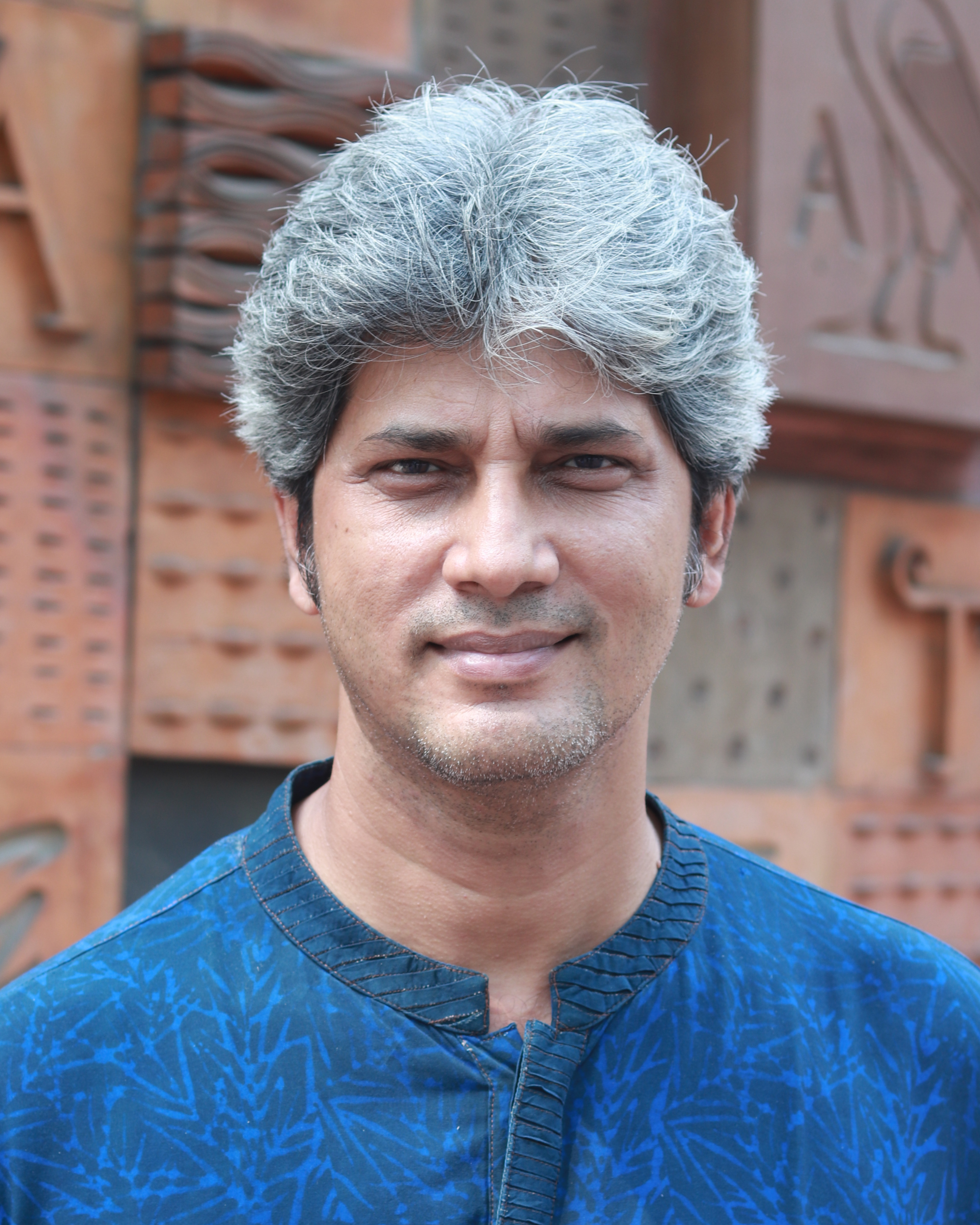
- Saki in 2025

Minister of State for Planning
- Incumbent
- Assumed office 17 February 2026
- Prime Minister: Tarique Rahman
- Preceded by: Shahiduzzaman Sarker

Member of Parliament
- Incumbent
- Assumed office 17 February 2026
- Preceded by: A. B. Tajul Islam
- Constituency: Brahmanbaria-6

Minister of State for Finance
- In office 17 February 2026 – 4 March 2026
- Prime Minister: Tarique Rahman
- Preceded by: Anisuzzaman Chowdhury

1st Chief Co-ordinator of Ganosanhati Andolan
- In office 29 August 2002 – 4 April 2026
- Preceded by: Post established
- Succeeded by: Dewan Abdur Rashid Nilu

Personal details
- Born: Zonayed Abdur Rahim Saki; 9 December 1973 (age 52) Brahmanbaria, Bangladesh
- Party: Ganosanhati Andolan
- Spouse: Taslima Akhter
- Education: University of Dhaka

Zonayed Saki (born 9 December 1973) is a Bangladeshi politician. He is currently the chief co-ordinator of Ganosanhati Andolan. He is the incumbent Jatiya Sangsad member representing the Brahmanbaria-6 constituency. He is also the Minister of State for Planning in Tarique Rahman Cabinet since February 2026.

== Early life ==
Saki was born in Charlahaniya village of Banchharampur Upazila in Brahmanbaria. He was born to Fazlur Rahman and Masuda Khanam. In 1991, he enrolled in the Department of Statistics at the University of Dhaka. During his university years, he became involved in student politics and social movements. He participated in the anti-autocracy mass uprising of 1990 and, in the post-movement period, began working with the Student Federation of Bangladesh. In 1998, he was elected President of the central committee of the Student Federation of Bangladesh.

Saki took part in major student movements were organized at the University of Dhaka, including protests against increased tuition and fees in 1998, JU Anti-Rape Movement in 1999, anti-imperialist demonstrations surrounding the visit of U.S. President Bill Clinton to Bangladesh, and movements for the protection of national resources. In 2000, following the sixth central council of the Bangladesh Chhatra Federation, Saki formally withdrew from student politics.

== Personal life ==
Saki is married to Taslima Akhter.

== Career ==
After retiring from student politics, Saki led the establishment of the Ganosamhati Andolan on 29 August 2002, bringing together activists from labour and social movements. The organization emerged as a political platform focused on national liberation and democratic struggle. On November 4 and 5, 2016, he assumed the duties as the chief coordinator of the central executive committee of the Ganosanhati Andolan in the special organizational conference.

In the 2015 Dhaka North City Corporation election, Saki, ran for the post of mayor but defeated. Later, he participated in the 2018 Bangladeshi general election from Dhaka-12 constituency but also defeated.

In terms of political movement, alliance of 4 left parties, 5 left parties, Democratic Left Front and the last Democratic Left Alliance were formed under his leadership.

In 2026, Saki's party formed an alliance with BNP ensuring only he participates in the 2026 Bangladesh general election under his party symbol in Brahmanbaria-6. He was elected as a Member of Parliament after defeating the candidate of Bangladesh Jamaat-e-Islami by a margin of 55,366 votes. He received 95,342 votes, while his nearest rival, Jamaat-e-Islami candidate Mohammad Mohsin, secured 39,976 votes. He was appointed to the Ministry of Finance and the Ministry of Planning during the administration led by Tarique Rahman.
