= Final Embrace =

Photograph by Taslima Akhter

- Artist: Taslima Akhter
- Completion date: April 2013
- Medium: Photograph
- Subject: 2013 Savar building collapse

Final Embrace is a photograph showing two victims in the rubble of the April 2013 collapse of the eight storey Rana Plaza building in Savar Upazila, Bangladesh. The photograph, taken by freelance photographer Taslima Akhter, was awarded third prize in the World Press Photo (single) in the "spot news category". It was also selected among Time magazine's "Top 10 Photos of 2013".

Akhter is a member of Nari Sanghati (a women's welfare organization), and a member of leftist political group Gana Sanghati Andolon. She works as a teacher at Pathshala, a school of photography in Dhaka.

== See also ==
- List of photographs considered the most important
