= Zahed Ali =

Bangladeshi politician

- জাহেদ আলী

Member of Bangladesh Parliament
- In office 15 February 1996 – Jun 1996
- Preceded by: Matia Chowdhury
- Succeeded by: Matia Chowdhury
- In office 2001–2006
- Preceded by: Matia Chowdhury
- Succeeded by: Matia Chowdhury

Personal details
- Died: 4 January 2011 (aged 63–64)
- Party: Bangladesh Nationalist Party

Zahed Ali is a Bangladesh Nationalist Party politician and a former member of parliament for Sherpur-2.

== Career ==
Ali was elected to parliament from Sherpur-2 as a Bangladesh Nationalist Party candidate in 2001. He served as the whip in the parliament. In 2010, he served as the central publication secretary of the Bangladesh Nationalist Party.

== Death ==
Chowdhury died of a heart attack at Square Hospital in Dhaka on January 4, 2011.
