= Laila Begum =

Bangladeshi politician

Member of Bangladesh Parliament
- In office February 1996 – June 2001

Personal details
- Political party: Bangladesh Nationalist Party

Laila Begum is a Bangladesh Nationalist Party politician and a member of parliament from a reserved seat.

== Career ==
Begum was elected to parliament from reserved seat as a Bangladesh Nationalist Party candidate in February 1996.

On 19 February 2015, Begum was detained outside the office of Bangladesh Nationalist Party chairpersons, Khaleda Zia, office along with other BNP politicians by Bangladesh Police.
