= Mohammad Ali (Netrokona politician) =

Bangladeshi politician

Dr Muhammad Ali

Member of Parliament for Mymensingh Cum Netrokona
- In office 1996–2006
- Preceded by: Mosharraf Hossain
- Succeeded by: Constituency Dissolved

Personal details
- Born: c. 1942
- Died: 3 October 2012 (aged 70)
- Party: Bangladesh Nationalist Party

Dr Muhammad Ali (c. 1942 – 3 October 2012) was a Bangladeshi physician and politician from Netrokona. He was a member of the Bangladesh Nationalist Party and served as a member of the Jatiya Sangsad.

== Biography ==
Ali was elected as a member of the Jatiya Sangsad from Mymensingh with Netrokona constituency in the Sixth General Election of Bangladesh. He was also elected from that constituency in the Seventh Jatiya Sangsad Election. He was elected from that constituency in 2001 too.

Ali was married to Rabeya Ali. They had two sons and two daughters.

Ali died on 3 October 2012 at Apollo Hospital, Dhaka at the age of 70.
