= Selina Rauf Chowdhury =

Bangladeshi politician

Member of Bangladesh Parliament
- In office February 1996 – June 2001

Personal details
- Party: Bangladesh Nationalist Party

Selina Rauf Chowdhury is a Bangladesh Nationalist Party politician and a former member of parliament from a reserved seat.

== Career ==
Chowdhury was elected to parliament from a reserved seat as a Bangladesh Nationalist Party candidate in February 1996.
