= Sahin Ara Haque =

Bangladeshi politician

Member of Bangladesh Parliament
- In office 1991–1996

Personal details
- Political party: Bangladesh Nationalist Party

Sahin Ara Haque is a Bangladesh Nationalist Party politician and a former member of parliament from a reserved seat.

== Career ==
Haque was elected to parliament from a reserved seat as a Bangladesh Nationalist Party candidate in 1991.
