= Abdul Khaleque (Brahmanbaria politician) =

Bangladeshi politician

Member of Bangladesh Parliament

Personal details
- Party: Bangladesh Nationalist Party

Abdul Khaleque is a Bangladesh Nationalist Party politician and a former member of parliament for Brahmanbaria-6.

== Career ==
Khaleque was elected to parliament from Brahmanbaria-6 as a Bangladesh Nationalist Party candidate in 2001.
