= Mosharraf Hossain (Netrokona politician) =

Bangladeshi politician

Member of Parliament for Mymensingh-13
- In office 2 April 1979 – 24 March 1982
- Preceded by: Rafiq Uddin Bhuiyan
- Succeeded by: Constituency Dissolved

Member of Parliament for Mymensingh Cum Netrokona
- In office 5 March 1991 – 24 November 1995
- Preceded by: M. A. Hamid
- Succeeded by: Mohammad Ali

Personal details
- Born: c. 1942
- Died: 7 February 2010 (aged 68)
- Political party: Bangladesh Awami League

Mosharraf Hossain (c. 1942 – 7 February 2010) was a Bangladeshi freedom fighter politician from Netrokona belonging to Bangladesh Awami League. He was elected twice as a member of the Jatiya Sangsad.

== Biography ==
Hossain was elected as a member of the Jatiya Sangsad from Mymensingh-13 constituency in 1979. Later, he was elected as a member of the Jatiya Sangsad from Mymensingh with Netrokona constituency in 1991.

Hossain died on 7 February 2010 at Renaissance Hospital in Dhaka.
