= M. A. Bari (Sherpur politician) =

Bangladeshi politician

Member of Bangladesh Parliament

Personal details
- Party: Bangladesh Awami League

M. A. Bari is a Bangladesh Awami League politician and a former member of parliament for Sherpur-3.

== Career ==
Bari was elected to parliament from Sherpur-3 as a Bangladesh Awami League candidate in 1996.
