= Noore-Ara-Shafa =

Bangladeshi politician

Member of Bangladesh Parliament
- In office 2005–2006

Personal details
- Political party: Bangladesh Nationalist Party

Noore-Ara-Shafa is a Bangladesh Nationalist Party politician and a former member of the Bangladesh Parliament from a reserved seat.

== Career ==
Noore-Ara-Shafa was elected to parliament from reserved seat as a Bangladesh Nationalist Party candidate in 2005.

Her husband, retired Captain MM Nurus Safa, died on 4 September 2012. He was the founder president of the Chittagong BNP.
