= Farida Hasan =

Bangladeshi politician

Member of Bangladesh Parliament
- In office 1991–1996

Personal details
- Died: 7 August 2008 (aged 78)
- Political party: Bangladesh Nationalist Party
- Spouse: Sayedul Hasan (died 1971)
- Children: 2

Farida Hasan was a Bangladesh Nationalist Party politician and a member of parliament from a seat reserved for women.

== Biography ==
Hasan was the founding general secretary of the cultural organization Chhayanaut. Her husband, Sayedul Hasan, came up with the name for the organization. He was a leader of the National Awami Party (NAP). He was killed by Pakistani forces in 1971.

She was a member of the central committee of the NAP before she joined the Bangladesh Nationalist Party (BNP). She was elected to parliament from a reserved seat as a BNP candidate in 1991.

Hasan died on 7 August 2008 in Dhaka.
