= Syed Muhammad Moshin =

Bangladeshi politician

Member of Bangladesh Parliament
- In office 1992–1996
- Preceded by: Harun Rashid Mollah
- Succeeded by: Kamal Ahmed Majumder

Personal details
- Political party: Bangladesh Nationalist Party

Syed Muhammad Moshin is a Bangladesh Nationalist Party politician and a former member of parliament for Dhaka-11.

== Career ==
Moshin was elected to parliament from Dhaka-11 as a Bangladesh Nationalist Party candidate in 1992 in a by-election following the death in office of the previous member of parliament, Harun Rashid Mollah.
