= Matia Chowdhury =

Bangladeshi politician (1942–2024)

- মতিয়া চৌধুরী
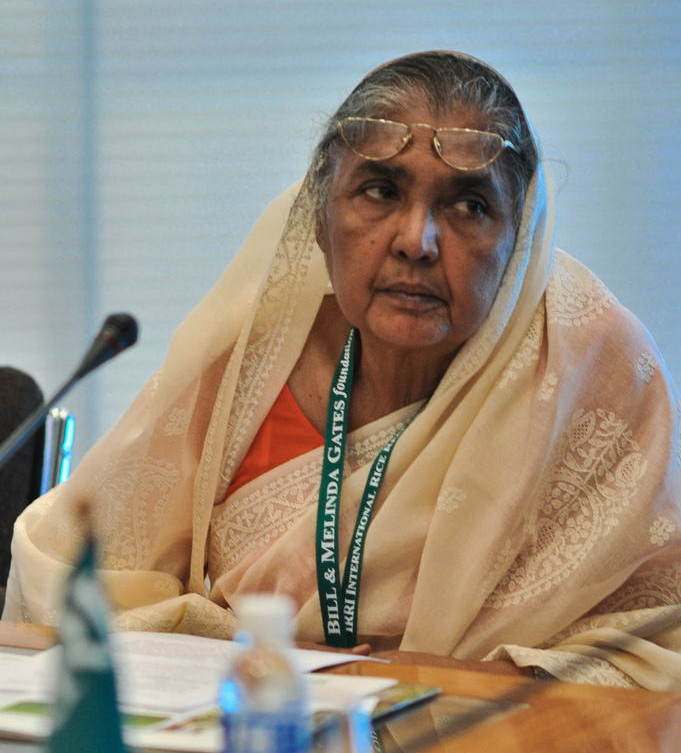
- Chowdhury in 2013

Minister of Agriculture
- In office 6 January 2009 – 7 January 2019
- Prime Minister: Sheikh Hasina
- Preceded by: Iqbal Hassan Mahmood
- Succeeded by: Mohammad Abdur Razzaque

Member of Parliament for Sherpur-2
- In office 25 January 2009 – 6 August 2024
- Preceded by: Zahed Ali
- Succeeded by: Mohammad Fahim Chowdhury
- In office 5 March 1991 – 13 July 2001
- Preceded by: Abdus Salam
- Succeeded by: Zahed Ali

Presidium Member of Bangladesh Awami League
- In office 21 December 2021 – 16 October 2024

Personal details
- Born: 30 June 1942 Nazirpur, Madaripur District, Bengal Province, British Raj
- Died: 16 October 2024 (aged 82) Evercare Hospital, Dhaka, Bangladesh
- Party: Awami League
- Spouse: Bazlur Rahman
- Education: University of Dhaka

Matia Chowdhury (Bengali: মতিয়া চৌধুরী, romanized: Matiẏā caudhurī; 30 June 1942 – 16 October 2024) was an Awami League leader. She was a deputy leader of parliament, and a Jatiya Sangsad member representing the Sherpur-2 constituency from 2009 to 2024. She held the position of minister of agriculture under the first, second and third premierships of Sheikh Hasina, from 1996 to 2001 and then again from 2009 to 2019 during the periods when the Bangladesh Awami League held power.

She was accused as a perpetrators of the July massacre orchestrated and executed by Sheikh Hasina's toppled regime.

== Early life and education ==
Chowdhury was born on 30 June 1942 at Nazirpur of Pirojpur District. Her father, Mohiuddin Ahmed Chowdhury, was a police officer. She passed HSC from Dhaka Eden College. She later graduated from University of Dhaka.

== Career ==
Chowdhury began her political journey during her student years, actively engaging in movements against the Ayub regime and the Education Commission of 1962. In 1963, she served as the vice-president of the Dhaka Eden Girls College Students' Union and became the general secretary of the Dhaka University Central Students' Union (DUCSU) in 1964–65. She played a significant role in various movements and protests, particularly during the liberation war, earning the nickname Ogni Konna or Girl of Fire due to her passionate speeches. She held the position of president of the East Pakistan Students' Union from 1965 to 1966. Between 1967 and 1969, she was involved in organizing the anti-Ayub movement and was imprisoned for approximately two years, being released during the mass uprising of 1969.

Chowdhury secured a parliamentary seat from Sherpur-2 as a candidate of the Awami League in 1991, receiving 47,886 votes, while her closest competitor, independent candidate professor Abdus Salam, garnered 34,644 votes. She was successful in the 1996 elections as well, receiving 63,574 votes against Bangladesh Nationalist Party candidate Jahed Ali Chowdhury, who received 45,659 votes.

In the 2001 election, Chowdhury was defeated, receiving 99,661 votes compared to Zahed Ali Chowdhury's 102,545 votes. She returned to parliament in 2008, again from Sherpur-2 as an Awami League candidate, with 156,973 votes, while her nearest rival, Zahed Ali Chowdhury from the Bangladesh Nationalist Party, received 75,637 votes.

Chowdhury criticized the World Bank for the slow release of funds in November 2009. In June 2010, she also criticized the Bangladesh Bureau of Statistics for providing "inaccurate statistics" on rice production. She supposedly donated her inheritance from Bazlur Rahman to the Liberation War Museum to establish the Bazlur Rahman Award for reporting on the liberation war.

== Controversy ==
Chowdhury faced significant backlash following her remarks regarding the 2018 quota reform movement in Bangladesh. During an unscheduled discussion in parliament, Chowdhury questioned the legitimacy of the protesters' demands by asking whether the children of those who fought for the country's independence should be denied opportunities in civil service recruitment. She further provoked outrage by implying that the children of Razakars—collaborators with the Pakistani military during the Liberation War—might benefit from the quota system, stating, “Will the quota for the freedom fighters be shrunk for them?”

Her comments ignited a wave of criticism on social media, with many perceiving her statements as dismissive of the protesters' concerns. A faction of the quota reform movement at Dhaka University publicly demanded an apology rejecting any association with Razakars. Protesters expressed their anger by burning effigies of Chowdhury in front of the Raju Sculpture, a significant site for student activism.

The controversy escalated as students from Jahangirnagar University threatened to declare Chowdhury persona non-grata on their campus unless she issued a formal apology within three days. No such apology was issued until her death.

Chowdhury is one of the individuals named in the cases filed with the Investigation agency of the International Crimes Tribunal (Bangladesh). The charges against her, along with 22 others, include crimes against humanity related to the violent suppression of the Anti-Discrimination Student Movement.

The complaints allege that Chowdhury, along with other high-ranking officials, was involved in orchestrating and planning actions that led to the indiscriminate firing on unarmed students and civilians, resulting in fatalities. Specifically, the accusations suggest that these actions were intended to eliminate participants in the movement, which sought to address issues of discrimination and injustice. The legal proceedings are based on the International Crimes (Tribunals) Act of 1973, which addresses serious crimes such as genocide and crimes against humanity.

== Death ==
Matia Chowdhury died on 16 October 2024, while receiving treatment at Evercare Hospital in Dhaka.

Following her death, CAO allegedly made the decision to deny her family's requests for a burial plot at the Mirpur Martyred Intellectual Graveyard, likely influenced by her involvement in the July massacre, resulting in her burial on top of her husband's grave.
