= Serajul Haque =

Bangladeshi politician

Member of Bangladesh Parliament
- In office 1991–1996
- Preceded by: Khandakar Mohammad Khurram
- Succeeded by: M. A. Bari

Personal details
- Born: 1 June 1936
- Died: 28 October 1994 (aged 58)
- Party: Bangladesh Nationalist Party

Serajul Haque was a Bangladesh Nationalist Party politician and a member of parliament for Sherpur-3. His son, Mahmudul Haque Rubel, was elected to parliament in 2001.

== Biography ==
Serajul Haque was born on 1 June 1936.

Haque was elected to parliament from Sherpur-3 as a Bangladesh Nationalist Party candidate in 1991.

He died in a road accident on 28 October 1994.
