= Sherpur-2 =

Constituency of Bangladesh's Jatiya Sangsad

Coordinates: 25.09°N 90.19°E

- Constituency for the Jatiya Sangsad
- District: Sherpur District
- Division: Mymensingh Division
- Electorate: 411,695 (2024)

Current constituency
- Created: 1984
- ← 143 Sherpur-1 145 Sherpur-3 →

Sherpur-2 is a constituency represented in the Jatiya Sangsad (National Parliament) of Bangladesh.

== Boundaries ==
The constituency encompasses Nakla and Nalitabari upazilas.

== History ==
The constituency was created in 1984 from a Mymensingh constituency when the former Mymensingh District was split into four districts: Mymensingh, Sherpur, Netrokona, and Kishoreganj.

== Members of Parliament ==
| Election | Member | Party |
|---|---|---|
| 1986 | Abdus Salam | Jatiya Party |
| 1991 | Matia Chowdhury | Awami League |
| Feb 1996 | Zahed Ali | BNP |
| Jun 1996 | Matia Chowdhury | Awami League |
| 2001 | Zahed Ali | BNP |
| 2008 | Matia Chowdhury | Awami League |
| 2026 | Mohammed Fahim Chowdhury | BNP |

== Elections ==
=== Elections in the 2010s ===
General Election 2014: Sherpur-2
| Party | Candidate | Votes | % | ±% |
|---|---|---|---|---|
| AL | Matia Chowdhury | 134,810 | 78.9 | +11.9 |
| Independent | Badiuzzaman Badsha | 35,986 | 21.1 | N/A |
| Majority | | 98,824 | 57.9 | +40.4 |
| Turnout | | 170,796 | 56.1 | −30.8 |
| AL hold | | | | |

=== Elections in the 2000s ===
General Election 2008: Sherpur-2
| Party | Candidate | Votes | % | ±% |
|---|---|---|---|---|
| AL | Matia Chowdhury | 156,973 | 67.0 | +17.2 |
| BNP | Zahed Ali | 75,637 | 32.3 | +7.4 |
| National People's Party | Mujafor Ahamed | 793 | 0.3 | N/A |
| Gano Forum | Muhammad Harunr Rashed | 717 | 0.3 | N/A |
| Majority | | 81,336 | 34.7 | +33.3 |
| Turnout | | 234,120 | 86.9 | +8.6 |
| AL gain from BNP | | | | |

General Election 2001: Sherpur-2
| Party | Candidate | Votes | % | ±% |
|---|---|---|---|---|
| BNP | Zahed Ali | 102,545 | 49.8 | +20.3 |
| AL | Matia Chowdhury | 99,661 | 48.4 | +7.4 |
| KSJL | Md. Shafiqul Islam | 2,235 | 1.1 | N/A |
| IJOF | Md. Akkas Ali | 1,132 | 0.6 | N/A |
| CPB | Abu Md. Mazhar | 256 | 0.1 | N/A |
| Majority | | 2,884 | 1.4 | −10.2 |
| Turnout | | 205,829 | 78.3 | +4.9 |
| BNP gain from AL | | | | |

=== Elections in the 1990s ===
General Election June 1996: Sherpur-2
| Party | Candidate | Votes | % | ±% |
|---|---|---|---|---|
| AL | Matia Chowdhury | 63,574 | 41.0 | −0.8 |
| BNP | Zahed Ali | 45,659 | 29.5 | +3.0 |
| Zaker Party | Abdus Salam | 41,456 | 26.8 | N/A |
| Jamaat | Md. Abdul Jalil | 4,314 | 2.8 | N/A |
| Majority | | 17,915 | 11.6 | 0.0 |
| Turnout | | 155,003 | 73.4 | +18.0 |
| AL hold | | | | |

General Election 1991: Sherpur-2
| Party | Candidate | Votes | % | ±% |
|---|---|---|---|---|
| AL | Matia Chowdhury | 47,886 | 41.8 | |
| Independent | Abdus Salam | 34,644 | 30.2 | |
| BNP | Zahed Ali | 30,309 | 26.5 | |
| FP | Akmal Hossain | 831 | 0.7 | |
| Independent | Md. Akhtaruzzaman Akhter | 537 | 0.5 | |
| BAKSAL | Md. Mostafizur Rahman | 353 | 0.3 | |
| Majority | | 13,242 | 11.6 | |
| Turnout | | 114,560 | 55.4 | |
| AL gain from JP(E) | | | | |
