= Lutfun Nesa Hossain =

Bangladeshi politician

Member of Bangladesh Parliament
- In office 1991 – February 1996

Personal details
- Died: 17 September 2024 Dhaka, Bangladesh
- Political party: Bangladesh Nationalist Party
- Spouse: Ek Lakh Hossain
- Children: 2

Lutfun Nesa Hossain (née Mustari) was a teacher, Bangladesh Nationalist Party politician, and a member of parliament from a reserved seat.

== Biography ==
Lutfun Nesa Mustari was born in Chapai Nawabganj town to Kashimuddin Ahmed, a social worker and philanthropist. She had three brothers. She married Ek Lakh Hossain, a lawyer and social worker. They had a son and a daughter.

Lutfun Nesa Hossain taught at Godagari Government Degree College in Rajshahi for more than two decades. She was elected to parliament from a reserved seat as a Bangladesh Nationalist Party candidate in 1991. She was reelected in February 1996.

She died on 17 September 2024 in Dhaka, Bangladesh.
