= Chandpur-6 =

Constituency of Bangladesh's Jatiya Sangsad

- Former constituency for the Jatiya Sangsad
- District: Chandpur District
- Division: Chittagong Division

Former constituency
- Created: 1984
- Abolished: 2006

Chandpur-6 is a defunct constituency represented in the Jatiya Sangsad (National Parliament) of Bangladesh abolished in 2006.

== Members of Parliament ==
Election	Member	Party
1986	Abdul Mannan	Jatiya Party
1991	Alamgir Hyder Khan	Bangladesh Nationalist Party
Abolished constituency
