= Brahmanbaria-6 =

Constituency of Bangladesh's Jatiya Sangsad

Coordinates: 23.77°N 90.80°E

- Constituency for the Jatiya Sangsad
- District: Brahmanbaria District
- Division: Chittagong Division
- Electorate: 289,674 (2026)

Current constituency
- Created: 1984
- Party: Ganosanhati Andolan
- Member: Zonayed Saki
- ← 247 Brahmanbaria-5 249 Comilla-1 →

Brahmanbaria-6 is a constituency represented in the Jatiya Sangsad (National Parliament) of Bangladesh since 2026 by Zonayed Saki of the Ganosanhati Andolan.

== Boundaries ==
The constituency encompasses Bancharampur Upazila.

== History ==
The constituency was created in 1984 from a Comilla constituency when the former Comilla District was split into three districts: Brahmanbaria, Comilla, and Chandpur.

Ahead of the 2008 general election, the Election Commission redrew constituency boundaries to reflect population changes revealed by the 2001 Bangladesh census. The 2008 redistricting altered the boundaries of the constituency.

Ahead of the 2018 general election, the Election Commission reduced the boundaries of the constituency by removing two union parishads of Nabinagar Upazila: Barikandi and Salimganj.

== Members of Parliament ==
Election	Member	Party
1986	Sahidur Rahman	Jatiya Party
1988	A. T. M. Wali Ashraf	Independent
1991	A. T. M. Wali Ashraf	Bangladesh Nationalist Party
1994 by-election	Shahjahan Hawlader Sujan	Bangladesh Nationalist Party
Jun 1996	AB Tajul Islam	Awami League
2001	Abdul Khaleque	Bangladesh Nationalist Party
2008	AB Tajul Islam	Awami League
2014	AB Tajul Islam	Awami League
2018	AB Tajul Islam	Awami League
2024	AB Tajul Islam	Awami League
2026	Zonayed Saki	Ganosanhati Andolan

== Elections ==
=== Elections in the 2020s ===
General Election 2026: Brahmanbaria-6
Party	Candidate	Votes	%	±%
GSA	Zonayed Saki	95,342	69.25	N/A
Jamaat	Md. Mohsin	39,976	29.04	N/A
BIF	Md. Abu Naser	2,353	1.71	N/A
Majority		55,366	40.21	N/A
Turnout		153,050	52.83	N/A
GSA gain from AL				

=== Elections in the 2010s ===
AB Tajul Islam was re-elected unopposed in the 2014 general election after opposition parties withdrew their candidacies in a boycott of the election.

=== Elections in the 2000s ===
General Election 2008: Brahmanbaria-6
Party	Candidate	Votes	%	±%
AL	AB Tajul Islam	94,016	61.0	+21.3
BNP	Abdul Khaleque	58,794	38.2	−1.5
JSD	K. M. Zabir	764	0.5	N/A
Gano Forum	Golam Mostofa Kamal	239	0.2	N/A
LDP	Dawan Ferdousur Rahman	221	0.1	N/A
Majority		35,222	22.9	+2.8
Turnout		154,034	86.5	+15.2
AL gain from BNP				

General Election 2001: Brahmanbaria-6
Party	Candidate	Votes	%	±%
BNP	Abdul Khaleque	75,716	59.8	+20.4
AL	AB Tajul Islam	50,306	39.7	−9.0
IJOF	Md. Shafiur Rahman	322	0.3	N/A
Independent	Md. Jalal Uddin Ahammad	226	0.2	N/A
Majority		25,410	20.1	+10.8
Turnout		126,570	71.3	−4.8
BNP gain from AL				

=== Elections in the 1990s ===
General Election June 1996: Brahmanbaria-6
Party	Candidate	Votes	%	±%
AL	AB Tajul Islam	48,872	48.7	+17.9
BNP	Rowson Alam	39,531	39.4	+4.0
JP(E)	Nur Mohammad	7,637	7.6	−13.2
Independent	K. M. Zabir	2,007	2.0	N/A
Jamaat	Dewan Md. Nokibul Huda	1,166	1.2	N/A
IOJ	Md. Monirul Haque	657	0.7	N/A
Zaker Party	Md. Al-Amin	428	0.4	N/A
Majority		9,341	9.3	+4.7
Turnout		100,298	76.1	+20.3
AL gain from BNP				

General Election 1991: Brahmanbaria-6
Party	Candidate	Votes	%	±%
BNP	A. T. M. Wali Ashraf	35,172	35.4	
AL	AB Tajul Islam	30,613	30.8	
JP(E)	Shahidur Rahman	20,624	20.8	
Independent	Md. Habibar Rahman	7,980	8.0	
Independent	A. W. M. Abdul Haq	3,899	3.9	
Jatiya Samajtantrik Dal-JSD	K. M. Zabir	386	0.4	
Jatiya Janata Party (Asad)	A. Rahman Ferdous	308	0.3	
Independent	Md. Ibrahim	276	0.3	
Majority		4,559	4.6	
Turnout		99,258	55.8	
BNP hold				
