= S. A. Khaleque =

Bangladeshi politician (died 2025)

Member of Parliament for Dhaka-14
- In office 18 February 1979 – 7 May 1986

Member of Parliament for Dhaka-11
- In office 7 May 1986 – 6 December 1990
- In office 15 February 1996 – 12 June 1996
- In office 1 October 2001 – 26 October 2006

Personal details
- Died: 5 January 2025 Dhaka, Bangladesh
- Party: Bangladesh Nationalist Party

S. A. Khaleque (Bengali: এস এ খালেক; died 5 January 2025) was a Bangladesh Nationalist Party politician and a member of parliament for Dhaka-11.

== Life and career ==
Khaleque was a member of the BNP executive committee. He had served as the deputy mayor of undivided Dhaka City Corporation.

He was elected a member of parliament for the first time from the then Dhaka-14 constituency in the second general election held on 18 February 1979 on the nomination of the BNP.

He was elected member of parliament from the Dhaka-11 constituency on the nomination of Jatiya Party in the 3rd Jatiya Sangsad elections held on 7 May 1986 and in the 4th Jatiya Sangsad elections held on 3 March 1988.

Prior to the sixth national election on 15 February 1996, he rejoined the BNP and was elected member of parliament. He was elected as a member of parliament from Dhaka-11 constituency in the 8th Jatiya Sangsad elections in 2001 as a candidate of the BNP.

He was defeated in the ninth parliamentary election of 2008 by participating in the nomination of BNP from Dhaka-14 constituency.

Khaleque died in Dhaka on 5 January 2025. He was 97.
