= Mahmudul Haque Rubel =

Bangladeshi politician

- মাহমুদুল হক রুবেল

Member of Parliament
- Incumbent
- Assumed office 12 April 2026
- Preceded by: A.D.M Shahidul Islam
- Constituency: Sherpur-3

Personal details
- Born: Sherpur, Bangladesh
- Party: Bangladesh Nationalist Party
- Parent: Serajul Haque (father)

Mahmudul Haque Rubel is a Bangladesh Nationalist Party politician and incumbent member of parliament for Sherpur-3.

== Career ==
Rubel was elected to parliament from Sherpur-3 as a Bangladesh Nationalist Party candidate in 2001. His father, Md Sherajul Haque, is a former member of parliament from Sherpur-3 and his uncle, A. K. M. Fazlul Haque of Bangladesh Awami League, was a former member of parliament.
