= Dhaka-11 =

Constituency of Bangladesh's Jatiya Sangsad

Coordinates: 23.77°N 90.43°E

- Constituency for the Jatiya Sangsad
- District: Dhaka District
- Division: Dhaka Division
- Electorate: 439,078 (2026)

Current constituency
- Created: 1973
- Party: National Citizen Party
- Member: Nahid Islam
- ← 183 Dhaka-10 185 Dhaka-12 →

Dhaka-11 is a constituency represented in the Jatiya Sangsad (National Parliament) of Bangladesh since 2026 by Nahid Islam of the National Citizen Party.

== Boundaries ==
The constituency encompasses Dhaka North City Corporation wards 21 through 23, and four union parishads of Badda Thana: Badda, Beraid, Vatara and Satarkul.

== History ==
The constituency was created for the first general elections in newly independent Bangladesh, held in 1973.

Ahead of the 2008 general election, the Election Commission redrew constituency boundaries to reflect population changes revealed by the 2001 Bangladesh census. The 2008 redistricting added 7 new seats to the Dhaka metropolitan area, increasing the number of constituencies in the capital from 8 to 15, and altered the boundaries of the constituency.

== Members of Parliament ==
Election	Member	Party
1973	Borhan Uddin Ahmed	Awami League
1979	Shamsul Haque	Bangladesh Nationalist Party
Major Boundary Changes
1986	S. A. Khaleque	Jatiya Party
1991	Harun Rashid Mollah	Bangladesh Nationalist Party
1993 by-election	Syed Muhammad Moshin	Bangladesh Nationalist Party
Feb 1996	S. A. Khaleque	Bangladesh Nationalist Party
Jun 1996	Kamal Ahmed Majumder	Awami League
2001	S. A. Khaleque	Bangladesh Nationalist Party
Major Boundary Changes
2008	Asaduzzaman Khan	Awami League
Major Boundary Changes
2014	AKM Rahmatullah	Awami League
2018	AKM Rahmatullah	Awami League
2024	Md Wakil Uddin	Awami League
2026	Nahid Islam	National Citizen Party

== Elections ==
=== Elections in the 2020s ===
General Election 2026: Dhaka-11
Party	Candidate	Votes	%	±%
NCP	Nahid Islam	93,872	48.7	N/A
BNP	M A Quayum	91,833	47.6	N/A
IAB	Sheikh Md. Fazle Bari Masud	4,375	2.3	N/A
JP(E)	Shamim Ahmed	1,048	0.5	N/A
Independent	Kohinoor Akhter Bithi	794	0.4	N/A
Bangladesh Republican Party	Md. Zakir Hossain	283	0.1	N/A
NPP	Md. Mizanur Rahman	241	0.1	N/A
BSM	Kazi Md. Shahidullah	196	0.1	N/A
Gano Forum	Md. Abdul Kader	130	0.1	N/A
GOP	Md. Arifur Rahman	81	0.0	N/A
Majority		2,039	1.1	N/A
Turnout		192,853	43.9	N/A
Registered electors		439,078		
NCP gain from AL				

=== Elections in the 2010s ===
General Election 2018: Dhaka-11
Party	Candidate	Votes	%	±%
AL	AKM Rahmatullah	186,681	44.93	N/A
BNP	Shamim Ara Begum	54,721	13.17	N/A
Gano Forum	Mozammel Haque	374	0.09	N/A
Majority		131,960	31.76	N/A
Turnout		241,776	58.18	N/A
Registered electors		415,455		
AL hold				

AKM Rahmatullah was elected unopposed in the 2014 general election after opposition parties withdrew their candidacies in a boycott of the election.

=== Elections in the 2000s ===
General Election 2008: Dhaka-11
Party	Candidate	Votes	%	±%
AL	Asaduzzaman Khan	130,424	61.9	+18.3
BNP	Mohammad Shahab Uddin	73,870	35.1	−16.6
BDB	Abdul Mannan	2,290	1.1	N/A
Independent	Sayeed Hossain Chudhury	1,875	0.9	N/A
IAB	Gazi Md. Abdul Based	1,613	0.8	N/A
BSD	Tahera Begum Joly	224	0.1	N/A
JSD	Md. Kamal Uddin Patuary	133	0.1	N/A
BJP	Muhammad Rhamatullah	115	0.1	N/A
Majority		56,554	26.9	+18.8
Turnout		210,544	71.0	+11.3
AL gain from BNP				

General Election 2001: Dhaka-11
Party	Candidate	Votes	%	±%
BNP	S. A. Khaleque	193,945	51.7	+13.9
AL	Kamal Ahmed Majumder	163,660	43.6	−4.0
IJOF	Sheikh Shawkat Hossain Nilu	14,384	3.8	N/A
CPB	Md. Morshed Ali	814	0.2	N/A
Bangladesh People's Congress	Md. Mosharaf Hossain	724	0.2	N/A
NPP	Rafi Ahmed Bidhyut	551	0.1	N/A
JSD	Asifur Rahman Babu	197	0.1	N/A
Bangladesh Progressive Party	Masum Ahmed	188	0.1	N/A
LDP	M. A. Manjur Hossain Shikder	170	0.0	N/A
Independent	Md. Ebadullah	131	0.0	N/A
Jatiya Party (M)	Md. Amanat Hossain	118	0.0	N/A
Samridhya Bangladesh Andolan	Md. Abu Saleh	62	0.0	N/A
Majority		30,285	8.1	−1.7
Turnout		374,944	59.7	−7.0
BNP gain from AL				

=== Elections in the 1990s ===
General Election June 1996: Dhaka-11
Party	Candidate	Votes	%	±%
AL	Kamal Ahmed Majumder	128,766	47.6	+1.1
BNP	Ekhlas Uddin Mollah	102,307	37.8	−10.2
JP(E)	Md. Taiabur Rahman	24,958	9.2	
Jamaat	Khandakar A. Mannan	8,946	3.3	+4.9
IOJ	Md. Abu Yusuf	2,292	0.8	
Zaker Party	Md. Abdul Latif	1,370	0.5	
Bangladesh Janata Party	Md. Wazed Ali Juktibadi	682	0.3	
WPB	Qamrul Ahsan	469	0.2	
Jana Dal	Md. Shamshad	129	0.0	
Jatiya Samajtantrik Dal-JSD	Kurshid Alam Khasru	112	0.0	
Bangladesh Bastuhara Parishad	M. A. Awal	105	0.0	
NAP	Nasima Haque Rubi	71	0.0	
Bangladesh National Congress	Md. Abu Bakar Siddique	66	0.0	
Independent	M. Salaluddin Ahmed	51	0.0	
Independent	Md. Hemait Uddin	45	0.0	
Independent	Md. Nurul Amin	43	0.0	
Social Democratic Party	Sheikh Mostaq Ahmed	32	0.0	
Jatiya Janata Party (Asad)	Mirza Munira Aktar	32	0.0	
NPP	Rafi Ahmed Bidydut	31	0.0	
Majority		26,459	9.8	+8.2
Turnout		270,507	66.7	+6.4
AL gain from BNP				

Harun Rashid Mollah died in November 1992. Syed Muhammad Moshin, of the BNP, was elected in a February 1993 by-election.

Dhaka-11 by-election, 1993
Party	Candidate	Votes	%	±%
BNP	Syed Muhammad Moshin	80,276	48.0	+5.2
AL	Kamal Ahmed Majumder	77,651	46.5	+5.5
JP(E)	Belal Ahmed	7,149	4.3	−1.3
Independents and others	14 other candidates	2,043	1.2	N/A
Majority		2,625	1.6	−0.2
Turnout		167,119	60.3	+12.0
BNP hold				

General Election 1991: Dhaka-11
Party	Candidate	Votes	%	±%
BNP	Harun Rashid Mollah	49,886	42.8	
AL	Kamal Hossain	47,750	41.0	
Jamaat	A. Gaffar	8,191	7.0	
JP(E)	Md. Taiabur Rahman	6,504	5.6	
Zaker Party	Md. Abdul Kabir	1,932	1.7	
Independent	Md. Badiuzzaman	644	0.6	
WPB	Kamrul Hasan	430	0.4	
BKA	Md. Zafrullah Khan	316	0.3	
Bangladesh Jatiya Tanti Dal	A. Satter	175	0.2	
Independent	Syed Najim Uddin Ahmed	169	0.1	
BAKSAL	Shafiqul Alam	138	0.1	
Independent	Md. Hamiduzzaman	133	0.1	
Bangladesh Manobatabadi Dal	Md. Zulfiqar Ali Bhutto	130	0.1	
Independent	ABM Shamsuddaulah	97	0.1	
Bangladesh Bekar Samaj	Afroza Begum	35	0.0	
Jatiyatabadi Gonotantrik Chashi Dal	Abdul Latif	16	0.0	
Majority		2,136	1.8	
Turnout		116,546	48.3	
BNP gain from JP(E)				
