= Alamgir Hyder Khan =

Bangladesh Nationalist Party politician

- আলমগীর হায়দার খান

Member of Bangladesh Parliament

Personal details
- Born: 1954; Chandpur District
- Died: 13 April 2016; Dhaka, Bangladesh
- Political party: Bangladesh Nationalist Party

Alamgir Hyder Khan (1954-2016) was a Bangladesh Nationalist Party politician and a member of parliament for the extinct Chandpur-6 (now Chandpur-4) seat.

== Career ==
Khan was elected to parliament from Chandpur-6 as a Bangladesh Nationalist Party candidate in 1991, 1996, and 2001.

== Death ==
Khan died on 13 April 2016 at Apollo Hospital, Dhaka, Bangladesh.
