= Syeda Nargis Ali =

Bangladeshi politician

Member of Bangladesh Parliament
- In office 2005–2006

Personal details
- Party: Bangladesh Nationalist Party

Syeda Nargis Ali is a Bangladesh Nationalist Party politician and a former member of the Bangladesh Parliament from a reserved seat.

== Career ==
Ali was elected to parliament from reserved seat as a Bangladesh Nationalist Party candidate in 2005.
