= Sherpur-3 =

Constituency of Bangladesh's Jatiya Sangsad

Coordinates: 25.15°N 89.94°E

- Constituency for the Jatiya Sangsad
- District: Sherpur District
- Division: Mymensingh Division
- Electorate: 413,377 (2026)

Current constituency
- Created: 1984
- Parliamentary Party: Bangladesh Nationalist Party
- Member of Parliament: Mahmudul Haque Rubel
- ← 144 Sherpur-2 146 Mymensingh-1 →

Sherpur-3 is a constituency represented in the Jatiya Sangsad (National Parliament) of Bangladesh.

== Boundaries ==
The constituency encompasses Jhenaigati and Sreebardi upazilas.

== History ==
The constituency was created in 1984 from the Mymensingh-6 constituency when the former Mymensingh District was split into four districts: Mymensingh, Sherpur, Netrokona, and Kishoreganj.

== Members of Parliament ==
Election	Member	Party
1986	Khandakar Mohammad Khurram	JaSaD (Siraj)
1991	Serajul Haque	BNP
1994 by-election	Mahmudul Haque Rubel	Independent
Feb 1996	Mahmudul Haque Rubel	BNP
Jun 1996	M. A. Bari	Awami League
2001	Mahmudul Haque Rubel	BNP
2008	A. K. M. Fazlul Haque	Awami League
2024	A.D.M Shahidul Islam	Awami League
2026	Mahmudul Haque Rubel	Bangladesh Nationalist Party

== Elections ==
=== Elections in the 2020s ===
General Election 2026: Sherpur-3
Party	Candidate	Votes	%	±%
BNP	Mahmudul Haque Rubel	166,117	76.99	+72.29
Jamaat	Masudur Rahman	47,051	21.81	+16.61
BSD (Marxist)	Mizanur Rahman	480	0.22	N/A
Majority		119,066	55.18	−35.42
Turnout		215,734	52.19	−11.77
Registered electors		413,377		
BNP gain from AL				

=== Elections in the 2010s ===
General Election 2018: Sherpur-3
Party	Candidate	Votes	%	±%
AL	A. K. M. Fazlul Haque	251,936	95.3	+3.5
BNP	Mahmudul Haque Rubel	12,491	4.7	−3.5
Majority		239,445	90.6	+6.9
Turnout		264,427		
AL hold				

General Election 2014: Sherpur-3
Party	Candidate	Votes	%	±%
AL	A. K. M. Fazlul Haque	96,234	91.8	+42.4
Independent	Hedayetul Islam	8,548	8.2	N/A
Majority		87,686	83.7	+64.8
Turnout		104,782	36.6	−48.3
AL hold				

=== Elections in the 2000s ===
General Election 2008: Sherpur-3
Party	Candidate	Votes	%	±%
AL	A. K. M. Fazlul Haque	106,631	49.4	+16.6
BNP	Mahmudul Haque Rubel	65,753	30.5	−18.3
Independent	Khandakar Mohammad Khurram	40,518	18.8	N/A
IAB	Mohammad Abdul Wahed	2,728	1.3	N/A
Gano Forum	Md. Abdullah-al-Mahmud	251	0.1	N/A
Majority		40,878	18.9	+3.0
Turnout		215,881	84.9	+14.7
AL gain from BNP				

General Election 2001: Sherpur-3
Party	Candidate	Votes	%	±%
BNP	Mahmudul Haque Rubel	86,785	48.8	+18.6
AL	M. A. Bari	58,393	32.8	+3.2
IJOF	Hedayetul Islam	24,955	14.0	N/A
Independent	A. R. M. Shahidul Islam	6,841	3.8	N/A
KSJL	Md. Dulal Uddin	826	0.5	N/A
Jatiya Party (M)	Mohammad Abdul Wahed	213	0.1	N/A
Majority		28,392	15.9	+10.1
Turnout		178,013	70.2	+9.2
BNP gain from AL				

=== Elections in the 1990s ===
General Election June 1996: Sherpur-3
Party	Candidate	Votes	%	±%
AL	M. A. Bari	42,994	36.0	+4.5
BNP	Mahmudul Haque Rubel	36,086	30.2	−4.3
JP(E)	Khandakar Mohammad Khurram	23,613	19.8	+10.3
Jamaat	Mazharul Islam	6,202	5.2	N/A
IOJ	Md. Abdus Sattar	5,726	4.8	−4.6
Independent	Hedayetul Islam	3,036	2.5	N/A
Gano Forum	Shah Md. Saiful Islam	974	0.8	N/A
Zaker Party	Md. Liakat Ali	460	0.4	−5.8
Independent	A. Y. M. Abdullah Hel Kafi	359	0.3	N/A
Majority		6,908	5.8	+2.8
Turnout		119,450	61.0	+15.2
AL gain from BNP				

General Election 1991: Sherpur-3
Party	Candidate	Votes	%	±%
BNP	Serajul Haque	34,749	34.5	
AL	Md. A Halimd	31,688	31.5	
JP(E)	Shah Md. Mostain Billah	9,583	9.5	
IOJ	Md. Abdus Sattar	9,456	9.4	
Independent	Abdul Bari	7,373	7.3	
Zaker Party	Mohammad Abdul Wahed	6,280	6.2	
BAKSAL	Abdullah Al Mamun	613	0.6	
Jatiya Samajtantrik Dal-JSD	Abul Hashem	522	0.5	
Independent	Md. Lokman Miah	442	0.4	
Majority		3,061	3.0	
Turnout		100,706	45.8	
BNP gain from JSD (S)				
