= Shahjahan Hawlader Sujan =

Bangladeshi politician

- শাহজাহান হাওলাদার সুজন

Member of Parliament for Brahmanbaria-6
- In office 1994 – 30 March 1996
- Preceded by: ATM Wali Ashraf
- Succeeded by: AB Tajul Islam

Personal details
- Died: 3 July 2001 (aged 35) Dhaka, Bangladesh
- Party: Bangladesh Nationalist Party

Shahjahan Hawlader Sujan (died on 3 July 2001) was a Bangladesh Nationalist Party politician and a Jatiya Sangsad member from the Brahmanbaria-6 constituency, winning by-election in 1994 and general election in February 1996. He served as the vice president of Haji Mohammad Mohsin Hall Students Union of the University of Dhaka. He was assassinated in 2001.

== Kidnapping and death ==
Sujan's body was found near the Doel Square at the University of Dhaka campus on 3 July 2001, five days after his abduction near Jonaki Cinema Hall in Dhaka. In 2003, the Criminal Investigation Department (CID) pressed charges against local BNP party member Kajol Ahmed Jalali and 11 others in the murder case. In March 2004, Dhaka Speedy Trial Tribunal sentenced Jalali to death and four others to life imprisonment. In March 2007, the High Court overturned the lower court verdict as the state counsel failed to prove the murder charges.
