= Rebeka Mahmoud =

Bangladeshi politician

Member of Bangladesh Parliament
- In office February 1996 – June 2001

Personal details
- Political party: Bangladesh Nationalist Party

Rebeka Mahmoud is a Bangladesh Nationalist Party politician and a former member of parliament from a reserved seat.

== Career ==
Mahmoud was elected to parliament from a reserved seat as a Bangladesh Nationalist Party candidate in February 1996.
