= Rajshahi-4 =

Constituency of Bangladesh's Jatiya Sangsad

- Constituency for the Jatiya Sangsad
- District: Rajshahi District
- Division: Rajshahi Division
- Electorate: 319,909 (2026)

Current constituency
- Created: 1973
- Party: Bangladesh Jamaat-e-Islami
- Member: Md. Abdul Bari Sarder
- ← 54 Rajshahi-3 56 Rajshahi-5 →

Rajshahi-4 is a constituency represented in the Jatiya Sangsad (National Parliament) of Bangladesh since 2026 by Md. Abdul Bari Sarder of the Bangladesh Jamaat-e-Islami.

== Boundaries ==
The constituency encompasses Bagmara Upazila.

== History ==
The constituency was created for the first general elections in newly independent Bangladesh, held in 1973.

Prior to 2008 delimitation, Rajshahi-4 consisted of Puthia and Durgapur Upazilas, currently Rajshahi-5 constituency. In the 2008 delimitation, a constituency was added to Rajshahi. Erstwhile Rajshahi-3, comprising Bagmara and Mohanpur upazilas, was broken up. A new constituency consisting only Bagmara upazila was created and designated Rajshahi-4.

== Members of Parliament ==
Election	Member	Party
1973	Shah Sirajul Islam Chowdhury	Awami League
1979	M. A. Salam Chowdhury	Bangladesh Nationalist Party
Major Boundary Changes
1986	Muhammad Ayyan Ud-Din	Bangladesh Muslim League
1988	Abul Hossain	Jatiay Party
1991	Tajul Islam Md. Faruk	Awami League
Feb 1996	Abdus Sattar Mondal	Bangladesh Nationalist Party
Jun 1996	Nadim Mostafa	Bangladesh Nationalist Party
2001	Nadim Mostafa	Bangladesh Nationalist Party
2008	Enamul Haque	Awami League
2014	Enamul Haque	Awami League
2018	Enamul Haque	Awami League
2024	Abul Kalam Azad	Awami League
2026	Md. Abdul Bari Sardar	Bangladesh Jamaat-e-Islami

== Elections ==
=== Elections in the 2020s ===
General election 2026: Rajshahi-4
Party	Candidate	Votes	%	±%
Jamaat	Md. Abdul Bari Sarder	115,226		
BNP	D. M. D. Ziaur Rahman	109,461		
Majority		5,765	2.5	−30.4
Turnout				
Registered electors		319,909		
Jamaat gain from AL				

General Election 2024: Rajshahi-4
Party	Candidate	Votes	%	±%
AL	Abul Kalam Azad	107,983	65.49	−26.37
Independent	Enamul Haque	53,812	32.63	N/A
JP(E)	Abu Taleb Pramanik	1,518	0.92	N/A
Majority		54,171	32.86	−52.17
Turnout		167,700	54.74	−19.82
Registered electors		306,344		
AL hold				

=== Elections in the 2010s ===
In the 2018 general election, the ruling Awami League renominated Enamul Haque. On the other hand, BNP gave ticket to former two-time MP Abu Hena. Enamul Haque retained the seat in a receiving over 91 percent of total vote cast. However, Abu Hena boycotted the election amid allegations of irregularities.

General Election 2018: Rajshahi-4
Party	Candidate	Votes	%	±%
AL	Enamul Haque	1,90,412	91.86	+41.56
BNP	Abu Hena	14,157	6.83	−32.17
IAB	Md Tajul Islam Khan	494	0.24	N/A
Independent	Sardar Mohammad Sirajul Karim	434	0.21	N/A
Majority		1,76,255	85.03	+3.4
Turnout		2,07,281	74.56	−18.74
AL hold				

Enamul Haque was re-elected unopposed in the 2014 general election after opposition parties withdrew their candidacies in a boycott of the election.

=== Elections in the 2000s ===
In the 2008 General election, the new-comer Enamul Haque received AL nomination, in lieu of veteran Sardar Amjad Hossain who had rejoined Awami League. Amjad Hossain decided to run as an independent candidate.

General Election 2008: Rajshahi-4
Party	Candidate	Votes	%	±%
AL	Enamul Haque	107,751	50.3	+6.6
BNP	Mohammad Abdul Gafur	83,633	39.0	−12.4
Independent	Sardar Amjad Hossain	20,676	9.6	N/A
CPB	Mohammad Mohosin Pramanik	1,861	0.9	+0.7
National People's Party	Zinnatul Islam Zinnah	298	0.1	N/A
BSD	Atikur Rahman	182	0.1	N/A
Majority		24,118	11.2	+3.4
Turnout		214,401	93.3	+1.1
AL gain from BNP				

General Election 2001: Rajshahi-4
Party	Candidate	Votes	%	±%
BNP	Nadim Mostafa	100,551	51.4	+17.6
AL	Tajul Islam Md. Faruk	85,356	43.7	+13.5
IJOF	Abdul Wahed	9,032	4.6	N/A
CPB	Md. Abul Kalam Azad	372	0.2	N/A
Independent	Md. Altaf Hossain	88	0.0	N/A
Jatiya Party (M)	Md. Nazrul Islam	54	0.0	N/A
Majority		15,195	7.8	+4.1
Turnout		195,453	92.2	+4.2
BNP hold				

=== Elections in the 1990s ===
General Election June 1996: Rajshahi-4
Party	Candidate	Votes	%	±%
BNP	Nadim Mostafa	50,827	33.8	+5.1
AL	Tajul Islam Md. Faruk	45,293	30.2	−7.9
JP(E)	Ayeen Uddin	23,701	15.8	+12.9
Jamaat	Mokshed Ali	17,996	12.0	N/A
Independent	Md. Nazrul Islam	7,843	5.2	N/A
Independent	Abdul Wahed	4,354	2.9	N/A
FP	Sayed Ali Hasan	164	0.1	N/A
Majority		5,534	3.7	−5.1
Turnout		150,178	88.0	+11.2
BNP gain from AL				

General Election 1991: Rajshahi-4
Party	Candidate	Votes	%	±%
AL	Tajul Islam Md. Faruk	47,194	38.1	
Bangladesh Muslim League (Aian Uddin)	Ayeen Uddin	36,254	29.3	
BNP	Abdus Sattar Mondal	35,482	28.7	
JP(E)	Abul Hossain	3,586	2.9	
CPB	Sadar Uddin Ahmed	1,325	1.1	
Majority		10,940	8.8	
Turnout		123,841	76.8	
AL gain from JP(E)				
