= Muhammad Abdul Gafur =

Bangladeshi politician

- মুহম্মদ আবদুল গফুর

Member of the Bangladesh Parliament for Rajshahi-3
- In office 15 February 1996 – 12 June 1996
- Preceded by: Sardar Amjad Hossain
- Succeeded by: Abu Hena

Personal details
- Born: Rajshahi District
- Party: Bangladesh Nationalist Party

Muhammad Abdul Gafur is a politician of Rajshahi District, Bangladesh and former member of parliament for Rajshahi-3 constituency in February 1996.

== Political life ==
Abdul Gafur is the senior vice president of Rajshahi District Bangladesh Nationalist Party. He was elected to parliament from Rajshahi-3 as a candidate of the Bangladesh Nationalist Party in the 15 February 1996 Bangladeshi general election. He lost the Rajshahi-4 constituency in the ninth general election in 2008.
