= Chapai Nawabganj-3 =

Constituency of Bangladesh's Jatiya Sangsad

Coordinates: 24.60°N 88.28°E

- Constituency for the Jatiya Sangsad
- District: Chapai Nawabganj District
- Division: Rajshahi Division
- Electorate: 468,479 (2026)

Current constituency
- Created: 1984
- Party: Bangladesh Jamaat-e-Islami
- Member: Md. Nurul Islam Bulbul
- ← 44 Chapai Nawabganj-2 46 Naogaon-1 →

Chapai Nawabganj-3 is a constituency represented in the Jatiya Sangsad (National Parliament) of Bangladesh since 2026 by Md. Nurul Islam Bulbul of the Bangladesh Jamaat-e-Islami.

== Boundaries ==
The constituency encompasses Chapai Nawabganj Sadar Upazila.

== History ==
The constituency was created in 1984 from the Rajshahi-3 constituency when the former Rajshahi District was split into four districts: Nawabganj, Naogaon, Rajshahi, and Natore.

== Members of Parliament ==
Election	Member	Party
1986	Latifur Rahman	Bangladesh Jamaat-e-Islami
1988	Ehsan Ali Khan	Independent
1991	Latifur Rahman	Bangladesh Jamaat-e-Islami
1996	Harunur Rashid	Bangladesh Nationalist Party
2001	Harunur Rashid	Bangladesh Nationalist Party
2008	Abdul Odud	Awami League
2018	Harunur Rashid	Bangladesh Nationalist Party
2023 by-election	Abdul Odud	Awami League
2026	Md. Nurul Islam Bulbul	Bangladesh Jamaat-e-Islami

== Elections ==
=== Elections in the 2020s ===
General election 2026: Chapai Nawabganj-3
Party	Candidate	Votes	%	±%
BNP	Md. Harunur Rashid			
Jamaat	Md. Nurul Islam			
IAB	Md. Monirul Islam			
GOP	Md. Shofiqul Islam			
BJSD	Md. Fozlur Islam Khan			
Majority				
Turnout				

=== Elections in the 2010s ===
General Election 2018: Chapai Nawabganj-3
Party	Candidate	Votes	%	±%
BNP	Harunur Rashid	133,661		N/A
AL	Md. Abdul Odud	85,938		N/A
Independent	Md Nurul Islam	59,517		N/A
Majority				
Turnout		382,580		
BNP gain from AL				

Abdul Odud was re-elected unopposed in the 2014 general election after opposition parties withdrew their candidacies in a boycott of the election.

=== Elections in the 2000s ===
General Election 2008: Chapai Nawabganj-3
Party	Candidate	Votes	%	±%
AL	Abdul Odud	112,753	43.1	+16.8
BNP	Harunur Rashid	76,178	29.1	−10.3
Jamaat	Latifur Rahman	72,341	27.6	N/A
Bangladesh Kalyan Party	Mohammad Sadruzzaman	634	0.2	N/A
Majority		36,575	14.0	+2.5
Turnout		261,906	88.0	+3.9
AL gain from BNP				

General Election 2001: Chapai Nawabganj-3
Party	Candidate	Votes	%	±%
BNP	Harunur Rashid	85,489	39.4	−4.1
Independent	Latifur Rahman	60,460	27.8	N/A
AL	Shamsul Haq	57,219	26.3	+6.3
Independent	Md. Rafiqul Islam	11,642	5.4	N/A
IJOF	Md. Kamal Uddin	1,621	0.8	N/A
Gano Azadi League (Samad)	Abdus Samad	468	0.2	N/A
Independent	Md. Aminur Rahman	335	0.2	N/A
Majority		25,029	11.5	−5.7
Turnout		217,234	84.1	+1.3
BNP hold				

=== Elections in the 1990s ===
General Election June 1996: Chapai Nawabganj-3
Party	Candidate	Votes	%	±%
BNP	Harunur Rashid	77,929	43.5	+16.6
Jamaat	Latifur Rahman	47,048	26.3	−9.0
AL	Nasir Uddin Ahmed	35,836	20.0	+2.1
JP(E)	Ruhul Amin	16,190	9.0	+8.0
GAL	Abdus Samad	812	0.5	N/A
Zaker Party	Abdus Sattar	654	0.4	+0.2
JSD	Abdus Samad Bokul	370	0.2	N/A
Gano Forum	Sazeman Haque	207	0.1	N/A
Majority		30,881	17.2	+8.7
Turnout		179,046	82.8	+11.7
BNP gain from Jamaat				

General Election 1991: Chapai Nawabganj-3
Party	Candidate	Votes	%	±%
Jamaat	Latifur Rahman	58,333	35.3	
BNP	Sultanul Islam Moni	44,318	26.9	
AL	A. A. M. Mesbahul Haq	29,455	17.9	
Independent	Abdul Mannan Sentu	28,930	17.5	
JP(E)	Ehsan Ali Khan	1,625	1.0	
Gano Azadi League (Samad)	Abdus Samad	1,314	0.8	
Bangladesh Muslim League (Kader)	Md. Belal Uddin	609	0.4	
Zaker Party	Syed Ahmod Imam	245	0.2	
Jatiya Samajtantrik Dal-JSD	Azizul Haq	213	0.1	
Majority		14,015	8.5	
Turnout		165,042	71.1	
Jamaat gain from JP(E)				
