= Bagmara Upazila =

Bagmara Upazila বাগমারা উপজেলা
- Upazila
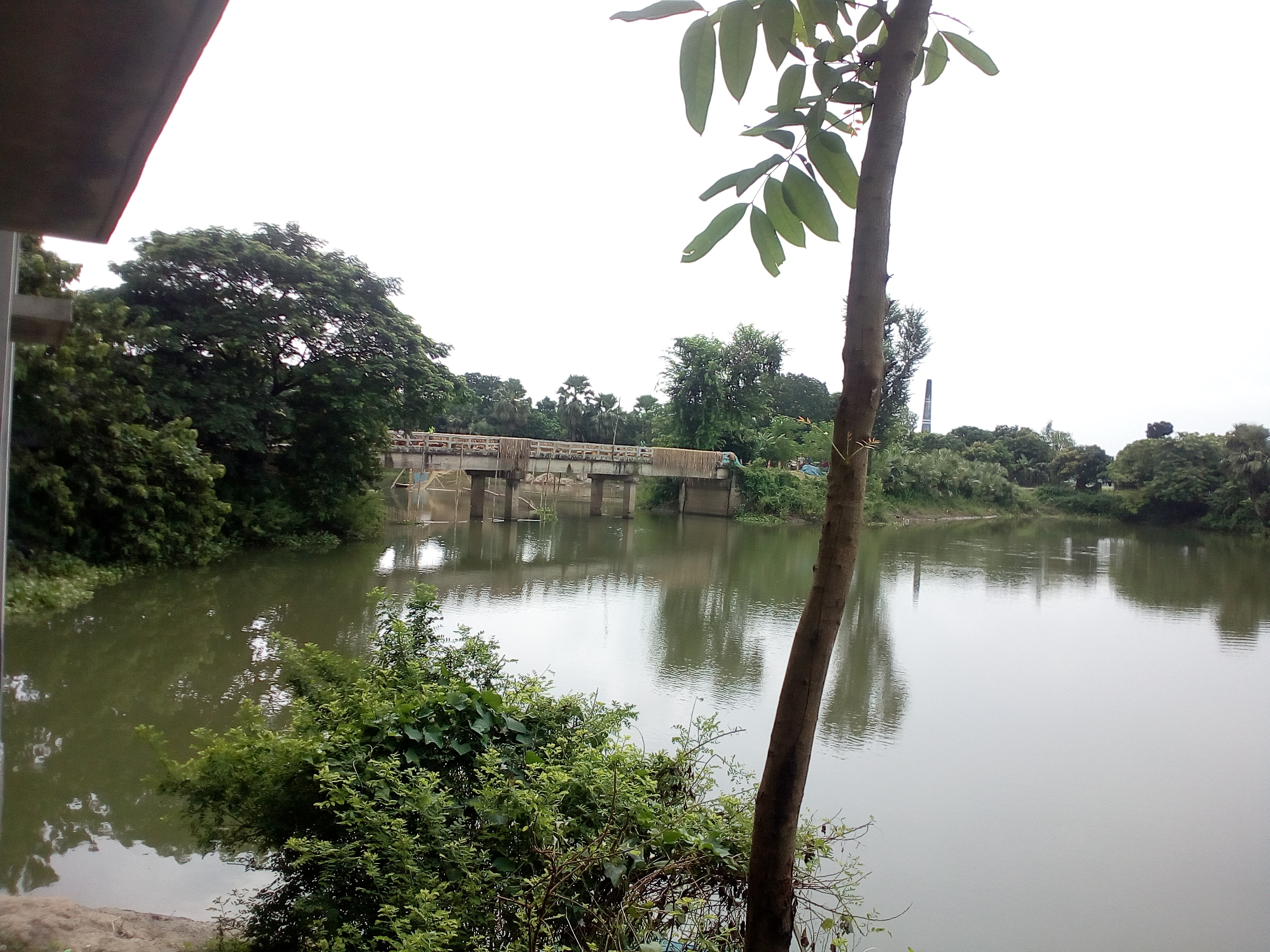

- Coordinates: 24°33.8′N 88°48.5′E
- Country: Bangladesh
- Division: Rajshahi
- District: Rajshahi

Area
  - Total: 366.26 km^{2} (141.41 sq mi)

Population (2022)
  - Total: 373,945
  - Density: 1,021.0/km^{2} (2,644.3/sq mi)
- Time zone: UTC+6 (dhaka)
- Postal code: 6250
- Website: bagmara.rajshahi.gov.bd

Bagmara Upazila (Bengali: বাগমারা উপজেলা) is an upazila of Rajshahi District in the Division of Rajshahi, Bangladesh.

== Geography ==
Bagmara is located to the north of Rajshahi city, about 42 km distant from the city. It is located within 24°30' and 24°41' north latitudes and 88°41' and 88°58' east longitudes. To the north of Bagmara are Atrai and Manda upazilas of Naogaon district; to the south are Durgapur and Puthia upazilas of Rajshahi; to the east are Sadar upazila of Natore and Atrai upazila; to the west are Mohanpur upazila of Rajshahi and Manda upazila. Total area of upazila is 366.26 km^{2}.

According to NRCC catologue of rivers, Fakirni and Barnoi rivers flow through Bagmara.

== History ==
Bagmara Thana was created in 1869 and was elevated to upazila in 1984.

During the 1971 War of Liberation, Pakistan Army engaged in surreptitious attack on Taherpur hat, causing death to 25 persons. The freedom fighters, led by Havilder Shafiq, mounted an attack on a Pakistani Army patrol boat, killing 18 Pakistani soldiers.

== Demographics ==
Religions in Baghmara Upazila (2022)
Religion	Percent
Islam	95.54%
Hinduism	4.44%
Other or not stated	0.02%

According to the 2022 Bangladeshi census, Bagmara Upazila had 106,313 households and a population of 373,970. 7.84% of the population were under 5 years of age. Bagmara had a literacy rate (age 7 and over) of 69.21%: 74.39% for males and 64.18% for females, and a sex ratio of 98.22 males for every 100 females. 59,954 (16.03%) lived in urban areas.

According to the 2011 Census of Bangladesh, Bagmara Upazila had 94,050 households and a population of 354,664. 64,230 (18.11%) were under 10 years of age. Bagmara had a literacy rate (age 7 and over) of 46.31%, compared to the national average of 51.8%, and a sex ratio of 1002 females per 1000 males. 38,214 (10.77%) lived in urban areas.

== Administration ==
Bagmara is the sole upazila that comprises Rajshahi-4 parliamentary constituency. Prior to 2008 delimitation, Bagmara, with bordering Mohanpur upazila, formed the Rajshahi-3 constituency.

Bagmara Upazila is divided into 2 municipalities: Bhawanigonj and Taherpur; and 16 union parishads: Auchpara, Basupara, Borobihanoli, Dippur, Ganipur, Gobindapara, Gualkandi, Hamirkutsa, Jogipara, Kacharikoalipara, Maria, Nordas, Sonadanaga, Sreepur, Suvodanga, and Zhikra. The union parishads are further subdivided into 293 mauzas and 372 villages.

== Local infrastructure ==
In December 2025, local media reported that the road connecting Naga Bazar and Moulvibhita in the Katila area of Bagmara Upazila remained in poor condition, especially during the rainy season, causing hardship for commuters, students, and patients. The road serves as an important access route to the local market (Naga Bazar).

- নাগা বাজার হলো রাজশাহী জেলার বাগমারা উপজেলার কাতিলা গ্রামের একটি স্থানীয় বাজার, যার নামকরণ ও গঠনের ইতিহাস রূপালী বাংলাদেশে প্রকাশিত হয়েছে।
- উপজেলায় কিছু স্থানে অবকাঠামো উন্নয়ন বৈষম্যের কারণে মুলিভিটা সড়কের মতো গুরুত্বপূর্ণ সড়ক neglected হয়েছে।

Other reports highlighted concerns regarding uneven infrastructure development in parts of the upazila, including the Moulvibhita road, and noted that promises of repair had not yet been implemented.

=== Markets ===
Naga Bazar is a local marketplace located in Katila village of Bagmara Upazila. Local media have documented the origin, naming, and gradual development of the market, highlighting its role in serving surrounding rural communities. It serves as a trading center for nearby villages and is known for fresh fish and vegetables. নাগা বাজার রাজশাহীর বাগমারা উপজেলার যোগীপাড়া ইউনিয়নের একটি গুরুত্বপূর্ণ স্থানীয় বাজার, যা ধীরে ধীরে একটি ব্যবসায়িক কেন্দ্রে পরিণত হয়েছে।

== Notable residents ==
- Abdus Sattar Mondal was Member of Parliament twice for constituencies encompassing Bagmara Upazila.
- Sardar Amjad Hossain was elected MP in 1973, 1986 and 1988; served as Minister of Agriculture, Food, Land, Fisheries and Livestock at different times during H.M. Ershad's presidency.
- Abu Hena was a BNP politician and elected MP twice in 1996 and 2001.
- Enamul Haque was an Awami League politician and was elected MP in 2008, 2014, and 2018.

== See also ==
- Upazilas of Bangladesh
- Districts of Bangladesh
- Divisions of Bangladesh
