= Jahanabad Union =

Jahanabad Union জাহানাবাদ ইউনিয়ন
- Union Council
- No. 6 Jahanabad Union Council
- Country: Bangladesh
- Division: Rajshahi Division
- District: Rajshahi District
- Upazila: Mohanpur Upazila

Government
  - Chairman: Muhammad Hazrat Ali

Population
  - Total: 28,828
- Time zone: UTC+6 (BST)
- Website: jahanabadup.rajshahi.gov.bd

Jahanabad Union (Bengali: জাহানাবাদ ইউনিয়ন) is a Union Parishad under Mohanpur Upazila of Rajshahi District in the division of Rajshahi, Bangladesh. It has an area of 11.11 square kilometres and a population of 28,828.

== Geography ==
Jahanabad Union is located in the Mohanpur Upazila. It borders Bagmara Upazila in the east, Bakshimail Union in the west, Raighati Union in the north and Durgapur Upazila in the south. It has an area of 11.11 square kilometres.

== Demography ==
Jahanabad has a population of 28,828.

== Administration ==
Jahanabad constitutes the no. 6 union council of Mohanpur Upazila. It contains 28 villages: Jahanabad, Fatehpur, Murshidpur, Mullahdangi, Hazrapara, Badehazrapara, Baroipara, Birahi, Bishhara, Chowk Birahi, Chandopara, Dorazpara, Dhorsa, Kotalipara, Dhamin Pakuria, Islabari, Kharta, Matihar, Naonagar, Nonabhita, Paikpara, Purpara, Tahirpur-Pakuria, Tatipara, Tashopara, Tegharmaria, Digadanga and Durgapur.

== Economy and tourism ==
It has five Haat bazaars: Jahanabad, Ullahpara (Hazrapara), Dhorsa, Kaikuri (Durgapur), Krithibari (Kotalipara).

== Education ==
The Union has a literacy rate of 95%. It has 18 primary schools and 3 high schools. There are three madrasas: Jahanabad Dakhil Madrasa (supervised by Muhammad Ali), Pakuria Hafizia Madrasa (supervised by Muhammad Monarul Islam Huzur) and Kotalipara Dakhil Madrasa (supervised by Mawlana Muhammad Azharuddin).

== Language and culture ==
The native population converse in their native Varendri but can also converse in Standard Bengali. Languages such as Arabic and English are also taught in schools. The Union contains 69 mosques and 18 eidgahs.

=== Sports ===
There are ten sports clubs in Jahanabad Union: Jahanabad Nabarun Club, Naonagar Sports Club, Dhorsa Youth Development Club, Matihar Youth Development Club, Shapla Sports Organisation Club (Pakuria), Mullahdangi Dishari Club, Bishhara Jagrata Society Club, Mitali Youth Club (Birohi), Ujjal Youth Club (Chowk Birohi) and Ekadash Youth Club (Purpara).
