= Harunur Rashid (Chapai Nawabganj politician) =

Bangladeshi politician

- হারুনুর রশীদ
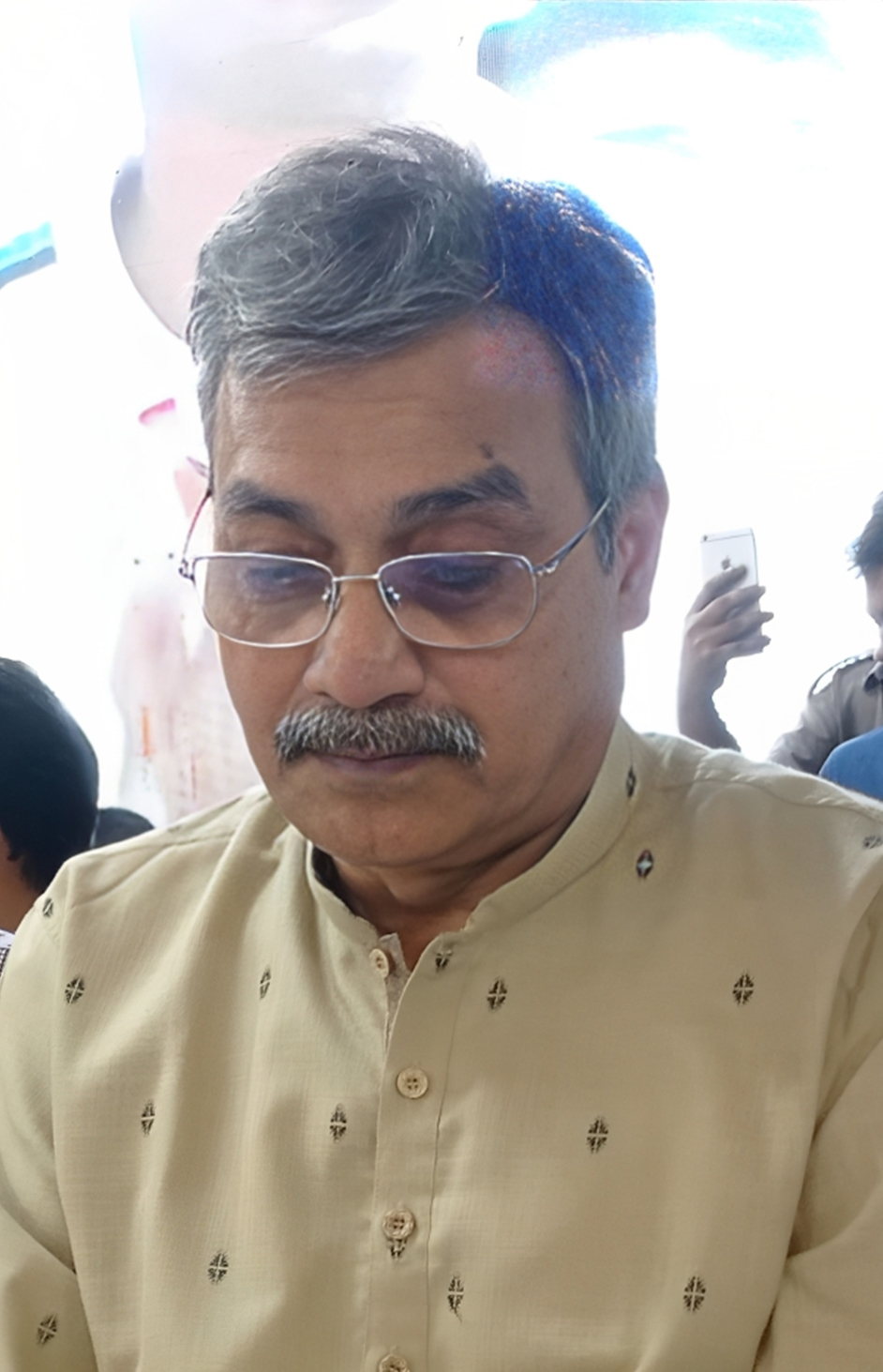
- Portrait of Harunur Rashid

Member of the Bangladesh Parliament for Chapai Nawabganj-3
- In office 30 January 2019 – 23 December 2022
- Preceded by: Abdul Odud
- Succeeded by: Abdul Odud
- In office 15 February 1996 – 1 October 2006
- Preceded by: Latifur Rahman
- Succeeded by: Abdul Odud

Personal details
- Born: 1 January 1962 (age 64) Chapai Nawabganj, East Pakistan, Pakistan
- Party: Bangladesh Nationalist Party
- Spouse: Syeda Asifa Ashrafi Papia

Harunur Rashid (born 1 January 1962) is a politician of the Bangladesh Nationalist Party and was the Jatiya Sangsad member for the Chapai Nawabganj-3 constituency from 2019 to 2022.

== Career ==
Rashid was elected to Jatiya Sangsad from Chapai Nawabganj-3 in the June 1996 Bangladeshi general election as a candidate of Bangladesh Nationalist Party. He had received 77,929 votes while his nearest rival, Latifur Rahman of the Jamaat-e-Islami, had received 47,048 votes.

Rashid was re-elected in the 2001 Bangladeshi general election. He had received 85,489 votes while the same rival, Latifur Rahman of the Jamaat-e-Islami, had received 60,460 votes.

Rashid contested the 2008 Bangladeshi general election from Chapai Nawabganj-3 as the Bangladesh Nationalist Party candidate but lost to Abdul Odud of the Awami League. He received 76,178 votes while the winner received 112,753 votes. Latifur Rahman of Bangladesh Jamaat-e-Islami also campaigned against him.

Rashid boycotted the 2014 election as per decision of the Bangladesh Nationalist Party and Abdul Odud of the Awami League was elected to parliament uncontested from Chapai Nawabganj-3.

Rashid was elected to parliament from Chapai Nawabganj-3 as a candidate of the Bangladesh Nationalist Party on 30 December 2018. He had received 133,661 votes while Abdul Odul of the Awami League and his nearest rival received 85,938 votes. He took the oath of office 90 days after the mandated time following instructions of Tarique Rahman. The four Bangladesh Nationalist Party members of parliament initially refused to join parliament as they had deemed the election unfair.

Rashid in parliament asked the speaker to create a committee to investigate the large number of cases filed against Bangladesh Nationalist Party politicians. Rashid resigned from parliament on 23 December 2022 as part of the BNP's anti-government protest.

=== Charges and convictions ===
Assistant Director Monayem Hossain of the Anti-Corruption Commission filed a case against Rashid for tax fraud in March 2007 with Tejgaon police station and then pressed charge in July. Rashid had imported a Hummer H2 on 25 April 2005 without paying tax as per his privilege as a member of parliament but later sold the to Ishtiak Sadek, violating the rules of the duty free facility, who sold it to Enayetur Rahman Bappi. The car, imported under duty free privilege, cannot be sold under less than years of being purchased. Rapid Action Battalion-2, commanded by Lieutenant Colonel Akbar Hossain, had spotted the Hummer in Panthapath and asked the men to come to their camp where they were detained.

In October 2019, Judge Shaikh Nazmul Alam of the Dhaka court sentenced Rashid to five years' imprisonment for dodging taxes while importing a luxurious car in 2007 and fined him five million taka. It also sent his co-accused former managing director of NTV and Channel 9, Enayetur Rahman Bappi, to two years imprisonment. His other co-accused proprietor of Sky Autos, Ishtiak Sadek, sentenced to jail for three years. A week later, the High Court granted him six months' bail in the case.

Justices Obaidul Hassan and AKM Zahirul Huq asked the government to explain why Rashid's parliamentary membership should not be canceled due to his conviction.

On 9 December 2021, Justice Md Selim of Bangladesh High court upheld the verdict in the tax evasion case against Rashid after hearing his appeal. The High Court commuted his sentence to time served.

== Controversy ==
On 15 November 2025, he publicly stated at a rally that “puja is a worship of the devil.” Following his communal and derogatory remarks on religion, widespread criticism erupted on social media, and the Bangladesh Hindu-Buddhist-Christian Unity Council demanded the cancellation of his candidacy in the upcoming election.

== Personal life ==
Rashid is married to Syeda Asifa Ashrafi Papia.
