= Kazi Abdul Wadud Dara =

Bangladeshi politician

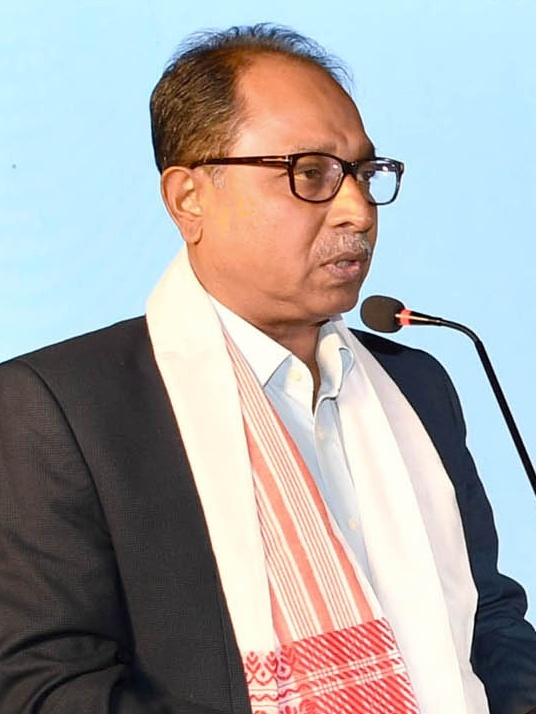
- Dara in 2024

Minister of State for Rural Development and Cooperatives Division
- In office 3 March 2024 – 6 August 2024
- Minister: Md Tazul Islam
- Preceded by: Swapan Bhattacharjee

Member of Parliament for Rajshahi-5
- In office 10 January 2024 – 6 August 2024
- Preceded by: Mansur Rahman
- Succeeded by: Nazrul Islam Mondol
- In office 29 December 2008 – 9 January 2014
- Preceded by: Kabir Hossain
- Succeeded by: Mansur Rahman

Personal details
- Born: 20 October 1962 (age 63) Rajshahi District, East Pakistan, Pakistan
- Party: Awami League

Kazi Abdul Wadud Dara is an Awami League politician and a former minister of state for rural development and cooperatives. He was a member of parliament from Rajshahi-5.

== Early ==
Dara was born on 20 October 1962 in Rajshahi. He has a bachelor's and a master's in science.

== Career ==
Dara was elected to parliament in 2008 from Rajshahi-5 as a candidate of the Bangladesh Awami League. Dara's supporters stuffed ballot boxes with fake votes in a January 2009 election for chairman and vice chairman in Rajshahi. Eight of his supporters were arrested by members of the Bangladesh Army from the polling station. On 5 February 2013, Dara's supporters rallied through Rajshahi with weapons following an inter-party clash. He filed cases against the daily newspaper Prothom Alo under sections 499 and 500 of the Bangladesh Penal Code for allegedly defamatory news stories.

Dara was re-elected on 5 January 2014 from Rajshahi-5 unopposed after the opposition boycotted the elections, citing unfair conditions and demanding a "neutral government" conduct the polls. He was the chairman of the Parliamentary Standing Committee on the Ministry of Food. He failed to receive the Awami League nomination in 2018, which went to Mansur Rahman.

In December 2019, Dara was appointed the secretary of the Rajshahi District unit of the Awami League.

== Personal life ==
After the fall of the Sheikh Hasina-led Awami League government, Dara's uncle and Awami League leader was tortured to death in Rajshahi in May 2025.
