= Ehsan Ali Khan =

Bangladeshi politician

- এহসান আলী খান

Member of Parliament from undivided Rajshahi-3
- In office 1979–1982
- Preceded by: A. A. M. Mesbahul Haq
- Succeeded by: Latifur Rahman

Member of Parliament from Chapai Nawabganj-3
- In office 1988–1990
- Preceded by: Latifur Rahman
- Succeeded by: Latifur Rahman

Personal details
- Born: 1 January 1931 Chapai Nawabganj, British India
- Died: 10 March 2017 (aged 86) Central Hospital Ltd, Dhaka

Ehsan Ali Khan (1 January 1931 – 10 March 2017) was a Bangladeshi politician in Chapai Nawabganj District. He was elected a member of parliament from undivided Rajshahi-3 in 1979 and from Chapai Nawabganj-3 in 1988. He was an organizer of the Liberation War of Bangladesh.

== Early life ==
Ehsan Ali Khan was born on 1 January 1931 in Chapai Nawabganj District. Her father is Antaz Ali Khan and mother Ayesha Khanam.

== Career ==
Ehsan Ali Khan was an organizer of the Liberation War of Bangladesh. He was elected a member of parliament from undivided Rajshahi-3 a Bangladesh Nationalist Party candidate in 1979 Bangladeshi general election and from Chapai Nawabganj-3 a Combined Opposition Parties candidate in 1988 Bangladeshi general election.

== Death ==
Ehsan Ali Khan died on 10 March 2017.
