= Rajshahi-3 =

Constituency of Bangladesh's Jatiya Sangsad

Coordinates: 24.46°N 88.61°E

- Constituency for the Jatiya Sangsad
- District: Rajshahi District
- Division: Rajshahi Division
- Electorate: 423,738 (2026)

Current constituency
- Created: 1973
- Party: Bangladesh Nationalist Party
- Member: Shofiqul Haque Milon
- ← 53 Rajshahi-2 55 Rajshahi-4 →

Rajshahi-3 is a constituency represented in the Jatiya Sangsad (National Parliament) of Bangladesh since 2026 by Shofiqul Haque Milon of the Bangladesh Nationalist Party.

== Boundaries ==
The constituency encompasses Mohanpur and Paba upazilas.

== History ==
The constituency was created for the first general elections in newly independent Bangladesh, held in 1973.

Ahead of the 2008 general election, the Election Commission redrew constituency boundaries to reflect population changes revealed by the 2001 Bangladesh census. The 2008 redistricting altered the boundaries of the constituency.

== Members of Parliament ==
Election	Member	Party
1973	A. A. M. Mesbahul Haq	Awami League
1979	Ehsan Ali Khan	Bangladesh Nationalist Party
Major Boundary Changes
1986	Sardar Amjad Hossain	Bangladesh Krishak Sramik Awami League
1988	Sardar Amjad Hossain	Jatiya Party
Feb 1996	Muhammad Abdul Gafur	Bangladesh Nationalist Party
Jun 1996	Abu Hena	Bangladesh Nationalist Party
2008	Meraj Uddin Mollah	Awami League
2014	Ayeen Uddin	Awami League
2024	Asaduzzaman Asad	Awami League
2026	Shofiqul Haque Milon	Bangladesh Nationalist Party

== Elections ==
=== Elections in the 2020s ===
General election 2026: Rajshahi-3
Party	Candidate	Votes	%	±%
BNP	Shofiqul Haque Milon	176,318		
Jamaat	Md. Abul Kalam Azad	137,927		
Majority				
Turnout				
Registered electors		423,738		
BNP gain from AL				

=== Elections in the 2010s ===
General Election 2014: Rajshahi-3
Party	Candidate	Votes	%	±%
AL	Ayeen Uddin	67,879	82.8	+29.9
Independent	Meraj Uddin Mollah	12,343	15.1	N/A
JP(E)	Md. Shahabuddin	1,744	2.1	N/A
Majority		55,536	67.8	+49.7
Turnout		81,966	25.6	−67.3
AL hold				

=== Elections in the 2000s ===
General Election 2008: Rajshahi-3
Party	Candidate	Votes	%	±%
AL	Meraj Uddin Mollah	142,487	52.9	+21.9
BNP	Kabir Hossain	93,649	34.8	−11.0
Jamaat	Ataur Rahman	32,527	12.1	N/A
PDP	Md. Abdul Hay	500	0.2	N/A
Majority		48,838	18.1	+3.3
Turnout		269,163	92.9	+6.5
AL gain from BNP				

General Election 2001: Rajshahi-3
Party	Candidate	Votes	%	±%
BNP	Abu Hena	113,255	45.8	+11.6
AL	Jinatun Nesa Talukder	76,717	31.0	+3.7
IJOF	Sarder Amjad Hossain	56,652	22.9	N/A
Independent	Md. Altafur Rahman	782	0.3	N/A
Majority		36,538	14.8	+7.9
Turnout		247,406	86.4	+2.6
BNP hold				

=== Elections in the 1990s ===
General Election June 1996: Rajshahi-3
Party	Candidate	Votes	%	±%
BNP	Abu Hena	67,863	34.2	+26.3
AL	Md. Ibrahim Hossain	54,121	27.3	+2.9
JP(E)	Sardar Amjad Hossain	41,836	21.1	−10.7
Jamaat	Md. Abdul Ahad Kabiraj	33,824	17.1	−9.1
Jatiya Samajtantrik Dal-JSD	Abu Zahid Mostaq Hossain	497	0.3	N/A
Majority		13,742	6.9	+1.3
Turnout		198,141	83.8	+15.0
BNP gain from JP(E)				

General Election 1991: Rajshahi-3
Party	Candidate	Votes	%	±%
JP(E)	Sardar Amjad Hossain	49,136	31.8	
Jamaat	Md. Abu Ahad Kabiraj	40,436	26.2	
AL	Shree Rakhal Chandra Das	37,626	24.4	
CPB	Md. Ibrahim Hossain	14,891	9.6	
BNP	Md. Enamul Haq	12,157	7.9	
Bangladesh Muslim League (Kader)	Nurul Alam	134	0.1	
Majority		8,700	5.6	
Turnout		154,380	68.8	
JP(E) hold				
