= Mohammad Abdul Wadud =

Bangladeshi politician

Md. Abdul Odud
- মোঃ আব্দুল ওদুদ

Member of Parliament for Chapai Nawabganj-3
- In office 8 February 2023 – 6 August 2024
- Preceded by: Harunur Rashid
- Succeeded by: Md. Nurul Islam Bulbul
- In office 25 January 2009 – 28 January 2019
- Preceded by: Harunur Rashid
- Succeeded by: Harunur Rashid

Personal details
- Born: 1 January 1964 (age 62) Nawabganj subdivision, Rajshahi District, East Pakistan
- Party: Bangladesh Awami League

Md. Abdul Wadud (born 1 January 1964) is a Bangladeshi politician. He is a former Jatiya Sangsad member representing the Chapai Nawabganj-3 constituency.

== Early life and education ==
Abdul Wadud was born in 1964 to a Bengali Bishwas family in the village of Chowk-Alampur in Nawabganj subdivision, Rajshahi District, East Pakistan. He is the youngest among the eight children of Mohammad Abdul Latif Bishwas and Mosammat Zaibunnesa. Abdul Wadud completed his elementary education from Maharajpur Primary School. He was involved in politics during his time at the Rajshahi Shiroil High School, briefly being imprisoned. He received his Secondary School Certificate from Maharajpur High School in 1978.
