= PABA =

PABA may refer to:

- Pan Asian Boxing Association, a boxing organization
- Philippine Amateur Baseball Association, the governing body of baseball in the Philippines
- 4-Aminobenzoic acid, also known as para-aminobenzoic acid or PABA, an organic compound
- Barter Island LRRS Airport (ICAO: PABA)
- Paba Upazila, Bangladesh
