= Durgapur Upazila =

Durgapur Upazila may refer to:

- Durgapur Upazila, Netrokona, Bangladesh
- Durgapur Upazila, Rajshahi, Bangladesh
