= Md. Abdul Bari Sarder =

Bangladeshi politician (born 1970)

- মোঃ আব্দুল বারী সরদার

Member of the Bangladesh Parliament for Rajshahi-4
- Incumbent
- Assumed office 17 February 2026
- Preceded by: Abul Kalam Azad

Personal details
- Born: 9 February 1970 (age 56) Bagmara Upazila, Rajshahi District, East Pakistan
- Citizenship: Bangladesh
- Party: Bangladesh Jamaat-e-Islami
- Education: Rajshahi Medical College
- Occupation: Physician and Politician

Md. Abdul Bari Sarder (born 9 February 1970) is a Bangladeshi physician and politician who was elected as a Member of Parliament for the Rajshahi-4 constituency as a candidate of the Bangladesh Jamaat-e-Islami in the 2026 Bangladeshi general election for the first time.

== See also ==
- List of members of the 13th Jatiya Sangsad
