= Azizur Rahman (Rajshahi politician) =

Bangladeshi politician (1948–2018)

- আজিজুর রহমান

Member of Parliament for Rajshahi-5
- In office 27 February 1991 – 12 June 1996
- Preceded by: Mohammad Nurun Nabi Chand
- Succeeded by: Md. Alauddin

Personal details
- Born: 15 August 1948 Rajshahi District
- Died: 1 May 2018 (aged 69)
- Party: Bangladesh Nationalist Party

Azizur Rahman (15 August 1948 – 1 May 2018) was a politician of Rajshahi District of Bangladesh and a member of parliament for the Rajshahi-5 constituency in 1991 and 15 February 1996.

== Birth and early life ==
Azizur was born on 15 August 1948 in Rajshahi district.

== Career ==
Azizur was an advisor to the Rajshahi district BNP and a member of the Bangladesh Nationalist Party's national executive committee. He was the former president of Rajshahi district BNP. He was elected member of parliament from Rajshahi-5 constituency on the nomination of BNP in the 5th parliamentary election (1991) and 6th parliamentary election (15 February 1996).

He was defeated from Rajshahi-5 constituency as a BNP candidate in the 2008 elections.

== Death ==
Azizur Rahman died on 1 May 2018.
