= Mokhlechhar Rahman Chowdhury =

Bangladeshi politician

Member of Bangladesh Parliament
- In office 1979–1986
- Preceded by: Sardar Mohammad Jahangir
- Succeeded by: Mohammad Nurun Nabi Chand

Personal details
- Born: 3 April 1927
- Party: Bangladesh Nationalist Party

Mokhlechhar Rahman Chowdhury is a Bangladesh Nationalist Party politician and a former member of parliament from Rajshahi-5.

== Biography ==
Mokhlechhar Rahman Chowdhury was born on 3 April 1927.

Chowdhury was elected to parliament from Rajshahi-5 as a Bangladesh Nationalist Party candidate in 1979.
