= Tajul Islam Md. Faruk =

Bangladeshi politician (died 2019)

- তাজুল ইসলাম মোহাম্মদ ফারুক

Member of Parliament for Rajshahi-4
- In office 5 March 1991 – 29 December 1994
- Preceded by: Abul Hossain
- Succeeded by: Abdus Sattar Mondal

Personal details
- Died: 31 January 2019 Rajshahi, Bangladesh
- Party: Bangladesh Awami League

Tajul Islam Md. Faruk (died 31 January 2019) was a Bangladesh Awami League politician and a Jatiya Sangsad member representing the Rajshahi-4 constituency during 1991–1995.

== Career ==
Faruk was elected to parliament from Rajshahi-4 as a Bangladesh Awami League candidate in 1991. He was the general secretary of Rajshahi District unit of Bangladesh Awami League.
