= Abdus Salam Chowdhury =

Bangladeshi politician

M. A. Salam Chowdhury
- এমএ সালাম চৌধুরি

Member of Bangladesh Parliament

Member of Parliament for Rajshahi-4
- In office 1979–1986
- Preceded by: Shah Sirajul Islam Chowdhury
- Succeeded by: Ayeen Uddin

Personal details
- Born: 2 March 1918 (age 108)
- Party: Bangladesh Nationalist Party

M. A. Salam Chowdhury is a Bangladesh Nationalist Party politician and a former member of parliament for Rajshahi-4.

== Biography ==
Chowdhury was born on 2 March 1918.

Chowdhury was elected to parliament from Rajshahi-4 as a Bangladesh Nationalist Party candidate in 1979.
