= Nurul Islam Bulbul =

Bangladeshi politician

Md. Nurul Islam Bulbul
- মো. নূরুল ইসলাম বুলবুল
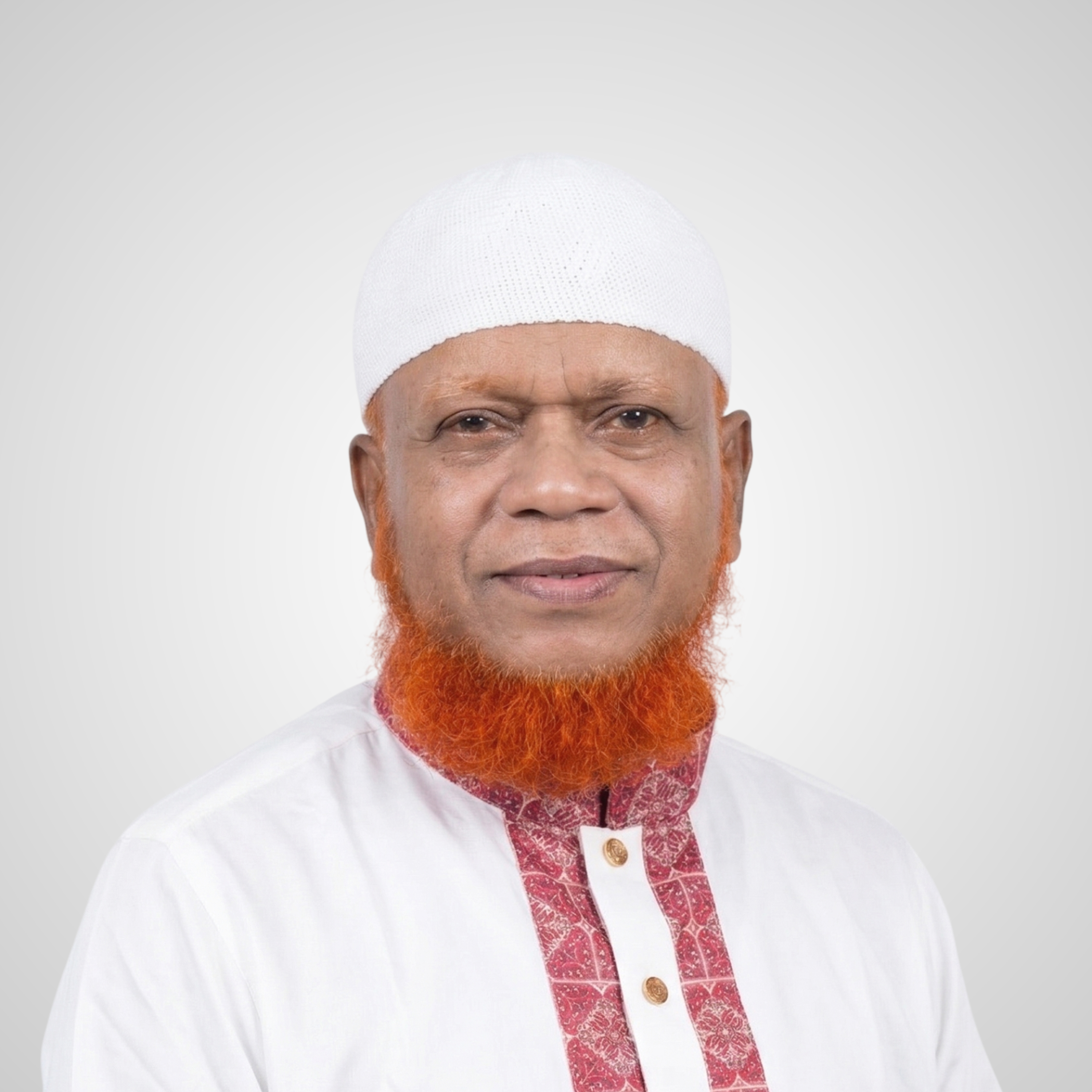

Member of the Bangladesh Parliament for Chapai Nawabganj-3
- Incumbent
- Assumed office 17 February 2026
- Preceded by: Mohammad Abdul Wadud

Personal details
- Born: 7 February 1968 (age 58) Rehai Char, East Pakistan
- Party: Bangladesh Jamaat-e-Islami
- Spouse: Kohinur Akhtar Sima (m. 2003)
- Children: 3 (two sons, one daughter)
- Education: Rajshahi University
- Occupation: Politician and educator
- Website: nurulislambulbul.com

Md. Nurul Islam Bulbul (born 1968) is a Bangladeshi politician and educator who, in February 2026, became the member of parliament for Chapai Nawabganj-3. He is a member of the Bangladesh Jamaat-e-Islami (Jamaat), having gotten his start in politics with their student wing, the Islami Chhatra Shibir (Shibir).

Bulbul was Shibir's central president from 2001 to 2002, and is a member of Jamaat's highest policy-making body, its central executive committee.

== Early life and education ==
Md. Nurul Islam Bulbul was born on 7 February 1968 in Rehai Char village, East Pakistan (now part of the city of Chapai Nawabganj, Bangladesh). He was the eldest of Mohammad Israel and Mosa Nurjahan Begum Nuri's 11 children. His father was a religious scholar and the principal of Krishna Gobindapur Degree College.

Bulbul completed his Secondary School Certificate (SSC) at Harimohan Government High School in 1983. He earned his Higher Secondary Certificate (HSC) at Nawabganj Government College in 1985, followed by a BSS degree from the same college in 1987. He studied political science at Rajshahi University, where he earned an MSS degree in 1991.

While a student, he became involved with the Islami Chhatra Shibir (Shibir). It is the student wing of the Bangladesh Jamaat-e-Islami (Jamaat), an Islamist political party.

== Career ==
Bulbul began his professional career as a lecturer in political science at Nawabganj City College. Later, he was the registrar of a private university.

Although no longer a student, he became president of the Rajshahi University unit of Shibir in 1995. He served as the organisation's central president from 2001 to 2002. On 8 January 2003, he married Kohinoor Akhtar Seema. They have two sons and a daughter. The same year, he joined Jamaat.

For the next 15 years, Bulbul held a series of party posts, such as assistant publicity secretary and secretary of the Dhaka Metropolitan unit. He also became a member of the party's highest policy-making body, its central executive committee.

In 2013, the High Court banned Jamaat from registering as a political party on the grounds that their charter violates the constitution. This prevented the party from contesting elections. Many party leaders were arrested or went into hiding. Bulbul was one of eight executive committee members who continued to meet virtually to take key decisions.

By 2018, Bulbul was also the ameer of the Dhaka Metropolitan South unit of the party. For the 2018 general election, Bubul ran as an independent candidate for Chapai Nawabganj-3. In a six-way contest, he came third, behind the Bangladesh National Party and the Awami League candidate.

In 2024, the July Uprising ousted the Awami League government, under which Jamaat had been banned. On 1 June 2025, the Appellate Division of the Supreme Court overturned the ban and restored the registration of the party.

The interim government of Muhammad Yunus called a general election for February 2026. Jamaat nominated Bulbul as their candidate for Chapai Nawabganj-3. He was elected with almost 60% of the vote and a majority of 62,603.

== See also ==
- List of members of the 13th Jatiya Sangsad
