= Ranhat =

Ranhat রণহাট
- Village
- Clockwise from top: Maps of Harian Union
- Location of Ranhat in Rajshahi
- Coordinates: 24.39°N 88.69°E
- Country: Bangladesh
- Division: Rajshahi Division
- District: Rajshahi District
- Upazila: Paba Upazila
- Union: 8 No. Harian Union Parishod

Population
  - Total: 1,845
- Time zone: UTC+6 (BST)

Ranhat (Bengali: রণহাট) is a village of 8 No. Harian Union of Paba Upazila, Rajshahi, Bangladesh.

== Geography ==
Ranhat is located at 24.3946°N 88.6854°E and is situated to the north-east of Rajshahi city in the northern part of Harian Union.

== Demographics ==
According to the 2011 Bangladesh census, Ranhat had 501 households and a population of 1,845, of which males constituted 49.1% and females 50.9%. 8.4% of the population was under the age of 5. The literacy rate (age 7 and over) was 45.4%, compared to the national average of 51.8%. Islam is the major religion; 97.1% of people are Muslim, the rest are Hindu.

== Education ==
M. R. K. College and M. R. K. High School, both in the neighboring village of Kukhandi, are the nearest college and secondary school.
