= Abul Hossain (Rajshahi politician) =

Bangladeshi politician

- আবুল হোসেন

Member of Parliament for Rajshahi-4
- In office 1988–1990
- Preceded by: Ayeen Uddin
- Succeeded by: Tajul Islam Md. Faruk

Personal details
- Born: Rajshahi District
- Party: Jatiya Party

Abul Hossain is a politician for Rajshahi District of Bangladesh and former member of parliament for the Rajshahi-4 constituency in 1988.

== Career ==
Abul is the president of Rajshahi District Jatiya Party. He was elected to parliament from Rajshahi-4 as a Jatiya Party candidate in the 1988 Bangladeshi general election.

He was defeated from Rajshahi-4 constituency as a candidate of Jatiya Party in the fifth parliamentary elections of 1991. He was expecting the nomination of Jatiya Party in Rajshahi-5 constituency in the Eleventh Parliamentary Election of 2018.
