= Shah Sirajul Islam Chowdhury =

Bangladeshi politician

- শাহ সিরাজুল ইসলাম চৌধুরি

Member of Bangladesh Parliament

Member of Parliament for Rajshahi-4
- In office 1973–1979
- Preceded by: Constituency initiated
- Succeeded by: M. A. Salam Chowdhury

Personal details
- Party: Bangladesh Awami League

Shah Sirajul Islam Chowdhury was a Bangladesh Awami League politician and a member of parliament for Rajshahi-4.

== Career ==
Chowdhury was elected to parliament from Rajshahi-4 as a Bangladesh Awami League candidate in 1973. He died before 2015.
