= Syeda Asifa Ashrafi Papia =

Bangladeshi politician

Member of Parliament
- In office 25 January 2009 – 24 January 2014
- Preceded by: Razina Islam
- Succeeded by: Quazi Rosy
- Constituency: Women's Seat-41

Personal details
- Born: 1 March 1967 (age 59) Domar, Rangpur district, East Pakistan
- Party: Bangladesh Nationalist Party
- Spouse: Harunur Rashid
- Education: University of Rajshahi

Syeda Asifa Ashrafi (Bengali: সৈয়দা আসেফা আশরফী), popularly known by her daak naam Papia (Bengali: পাপিয়া), is a Bangladesh Nationalist Party politician and a former member of parliament from a reserved seat. Her husband, Harunur Rashid, was also a member of parliament.

== Early life ==
Papia was born on 1 March 1967 in Domar, Nilphamari subdivision, Rangpur district, East Pakistan (now Bangladesh). She belongs to the Ashrafi family, a Bengali family of Muslim Syeds from the village of Gopalpur in Lalpur, Natore. Due to the career of her father, Syed Abdul Monayem, within the Bangladesh Agricultural Development Corporation, she spent her childhood in various parts of North Bengal. When her father transferred to Thakurgaon Sugar Mill, she studied in a school in Thakurgaon for 9 months. In 1974, she enrolled at the North Bengal Sugar Mill High School where she completed her Secondary School Certificate in 1983. She passed her Higher Secondary Certificate from Gopalpur College in 1986. She graduated with Bachelor of Arts in Social Science and Bachelor of Laws from the University of Rajshahi.

== Career ==
Papia was elected to parliament from a reserved seat as a Bangladesh Nationalist Party candidate in 2009. She served as the general secretary of Chapainawabganj District unit of the Bangladesh Nationalist Party. On 16 June 2015, she was arrested on arson charges by Bangladesh Police.
