= Nadim Mostafa =

Bangladeshi politician (1965/1966–2024)

Member of Bangladesh Parliament

Personal details
- Born: 1965/1966 East Pakistan, Pakistan
- Died: 30 June 2024 (aged 58) Dhaka, Bangladesh
- Party: Bangladesh Nationalist Party

Nadim Mostafa (Bengali: নাদিম মোস্তফা; 1965/1966 – 30 June 2024) was a Bangladesh Nationalist Party politician and a member of parliament for Rajshahi-4. He was a close associate of Tarique Rahman, son of Ziaur Rahman and Khaleda Zia.

== Career ==
Mostafa was elected to parliament from Rajshahi-4 as a Bangladesh Nationalist Party candidate in 1996 and 2001. He was the special secretary of the Bangladesh Nationalist Party.

Mostafa went into hiding in early 2007 during the 2006–2008 Bangladeshi political crisis. On 3 July 2007, Mostafa was sentenced to five years imprisonment for extortion.

Charges were framed against him on 24 April 2007 for supporting militants. A victim of Jamaat-ul-Mujahideen Bangladesh filed the case against Mostafa, Ruhul Kuddus Talukder Dulu, and Aminul Haque were charged in the case of abetting the Islamic militant organisation. In July 2007, Mostafa was acquitted in the case over the embezzlement of corrugated galvanised iron sheets from a government relief fund. On 15 August 2007, Mostafa was sentenced to ten years imprisonment on an extortion case. He was alleged to have tried to extort Molla Hasan Imam Faruk, Maria Union Parishad chairperson, ahead of elections. On 25 September 2007, two other cases were filed against him, one for extortion and another for abetting militants.

The Daily Star reported on 3 August 2008 that Mostafa, along with Ruhul Kuddus Talukder Dulu, Mizanur Rahman Minu, and Alamgir Kabir, used state resources during the Bangladesh Nationalist Party government to finance militants such as Jamaat-ul-Mujahideen Bangladesh in Rajshahi. The Anti-Corruption Commission pressed charges against him for allegedly possessing 28.6 million taka in illegal wealth on 11 November 2008. The name of his wife, Nurunnahar Parul, was dropped from the charge sheet as no evidence was found against her during the investigation.

On 13 May 2009, Mostafa surrendered before a Rajshahi court and was sent to jail by Judge Lutfa Begum. Mostafa secured bail from a bench of the Bangladesh High Court on 5 June 2009. On 14 July 2009, a victim of Bangla Bhai sued Mostafa for allegedly supporting the terrorist in 2004.

On 22 March 2011, supporters of Mostafa clashed with activists of the Awami League in Rajshahi. In April 2011, an investigation commission found that he was involved in the repression of religious minorities during the 2001 Bangladesh post-election violence.

On 30 April 2012, Mostafa participated in a countrywide strike called by the Bangladesh Nationalist Party in which 10 people were injured in Rajshahi. Mizanur Rahman Minu, joint secretary of the Rajshahi District unit of the Bangladesh Nationalist Party, burned Mostafa's effigies while alleging that Mostafa's supporters dominated all committees of the Bangladesh Nationalist Party in the district on 19 December 2012. Mostafa was the president of the Rajshahi District unit of the Bangladesh Nationalist Party.

Mostafa was injured while participating in a hartal (strike) in Rajshahi on 23 April 2013. It was the first day of a 36-hour countrywide strike called by the Bangladesh Nationalist Party. On 29 September 2013, Mostafa was sued along with 89 others for their involvement in the death of Constable Siddhartha Chandra Sarkar. On 26 December 2012, Siddhartha Chandra Sarkar was killed and eight other police officers were injured in a bomb attack on a police van by Bangladesh Nationalist Party activists during a strike.

Mostafa was nominated by the Bangladesh Nationalist Party to contest the 2018 general election from Rajshahi-5. The Bangladesh Nationalist Party originally nominated Professor Nazrul Islam and then later gave the nomination to Mostafa. The Bangladesh High Court, in a verdict, disallowed him from participating in the election.

== Death ==
Nadim died on 30 June 2024 at United Hospital, Dhaka, after suffering a heart attack. He was 58.
