= Mirza Muhammad Yusuf Ali =

Former Bengali writer and reformer in British Occupied India

- Born: 1858; Aliabad, Bengal Presidency, British India
- Died: 30 May 1920 (aged 61–62)
- Citizenship: British India
- Education: Rajshahi Normal School
- Occupations: Writer, teacher
- Writing career
- Language: Bengali
- Notable work: Saubhagya Sparshamani

Mirza Muhammad Yusuf Ali (1858 – 30 May 1920) was a Bengali writer and reformer in British India.

== Early life ==
Ali was born in 1858 to a Bengali Muslim family of Mirzas in the village of Aliabad in Rajshahi district, Bengal Presidency. After completing his studies at the Sreedharpur Bengali Middle School, he enrolled at the Rajshahi Normal School. He passed in quarterly examinations but was unable to continue studying, and so he passed his matriculation in 1887 as a private candidate instead of a regular candidate. In 1889, he could not pass the F.A. examination and did not continue his education. Apart from Bengali and English, Ali was self-taught in Arabic, Persian and Urdu.

== Career ==
He began his career joining as a teacher in school of Cooch Behar. He was also teacher in Loknath School and Rangpur Government Normal School. He served as school-inspector and sub-registrar. He retired in 1917.

== Social reform ==
Ali became involved in social reform after his retirement. In 1884, he founded the Nur-al-Iman Society, an educational organisation which sought to empower the Muslim community, and served as its first secretary. It was inspired by the Brethren of Purity and The Asiatic Society. As part of the society's initiatives, Ali established the Fuller Hostel in Rajshahi and Muslim Hostel in Naogaon. Ali edited the society's newspaper Nur al-Iman and was also the editor of Shikkha Samachar and Shikkha Samabay (1919). He was the founder of Anjuman-e-Hemayate Islam (1891) and Rajshahi District Mussalman Education Society (1918). Ali was the chief patron of Soltan, a daily newspaper published from Calcutta between 1926 and 1928 and edited by Maniruzzaman Islamabadi.

== Literature ==
His first book Dugdha-Sarobar first published in 1891. In 1895, he completed Saubhagya Sparshamani, a five-volume Bengali translation of Al-Ghazali's Kimiya-yi sa'ādat.

== Death ==
Ali died on 30 May 1920.
