= Sardar Mohammad Jahangir =

Bangladeshi politician

Member of Bangladesh Parliament
- In office 1973–1979
- Succeeded by: Mokhlechhar Rahman Chowdhury

Personal details
- Party: Bangladesh Awami League

Sardar Mohammad Jahangir is a Bangladesh Awami League politician and a former member of parliament for the Rajshahi-5 constituency.

== Career ==
Jahangir was elected to parliament from Rajshahi-5 as a Bangladesh Awami League candidate in 1973.
