= A. A. M. Mesbahul Haq =

Bangladeshi politician

A. A. Muhammad Mesbahul Haq

Member of Bangladesh Parliament
- In office 1973–1979
- Succeeded by: Ehsan Ali Khan

Personal details
- Born: 1930 Baliadanga, Nawabganj, Malda district, Bengal Presidency
- Died: January 16, 2009 (aged 78–79) Bangladesh
- Party: Awami League

A. A. Muhammad Mesbahul Haq was a Bangladeshi politician and a former member of parliament for Rajshahi-3. He was awarded an Ekushey Padak posthumously in 2020.

== Career ==
Haq was elected to parliament from Rajshahi-3 as an Awami League candidate in 1973.
