= Abul Kalam Azad (Rajshahi politician) =

Bangladeshi politician

- আবুল কালাম আজাদ
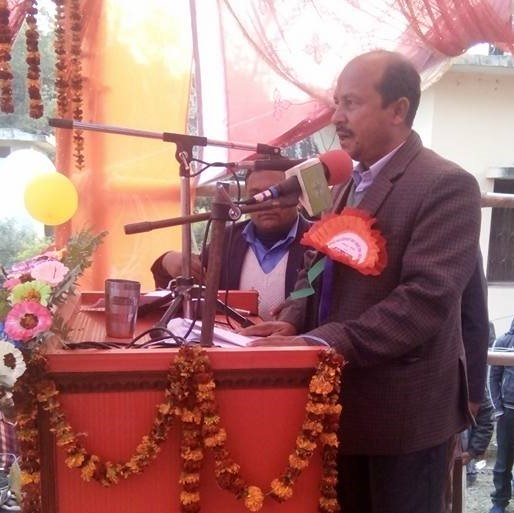

Member of the Bangladesh Parliament for Rajshahi-4
- In office 10 January 2024 – 6 August 2024
- Preceded by: Enamul Haque
- Succeeded by: Md. Abdul Bari Sarder

Personal details
- Born: 16 April 1975 (age 51)
- Party: Bangladesh Awami League
- Occupation: Politician

Abul Kalam Azad (born 16 April 1975) is a Bangladeshi politician. He is a former Jatiya Sangsad member representing the Rajshahi-4 Constituency.

== Political life ==
Abul Kalam Azad was nominated as a member of parliament as a candidate of the Awami League from the Rajshahi-4 constituency in the 2024 Bangladeshi general election.

Azad was detained on 2 October 2024 by the Rapid Action Battalion after the fall of the Sheikh Hasina-led Awami League government.
