= Kismat Maria Mosque =

Mosque in Rajshahi, Bangladesh

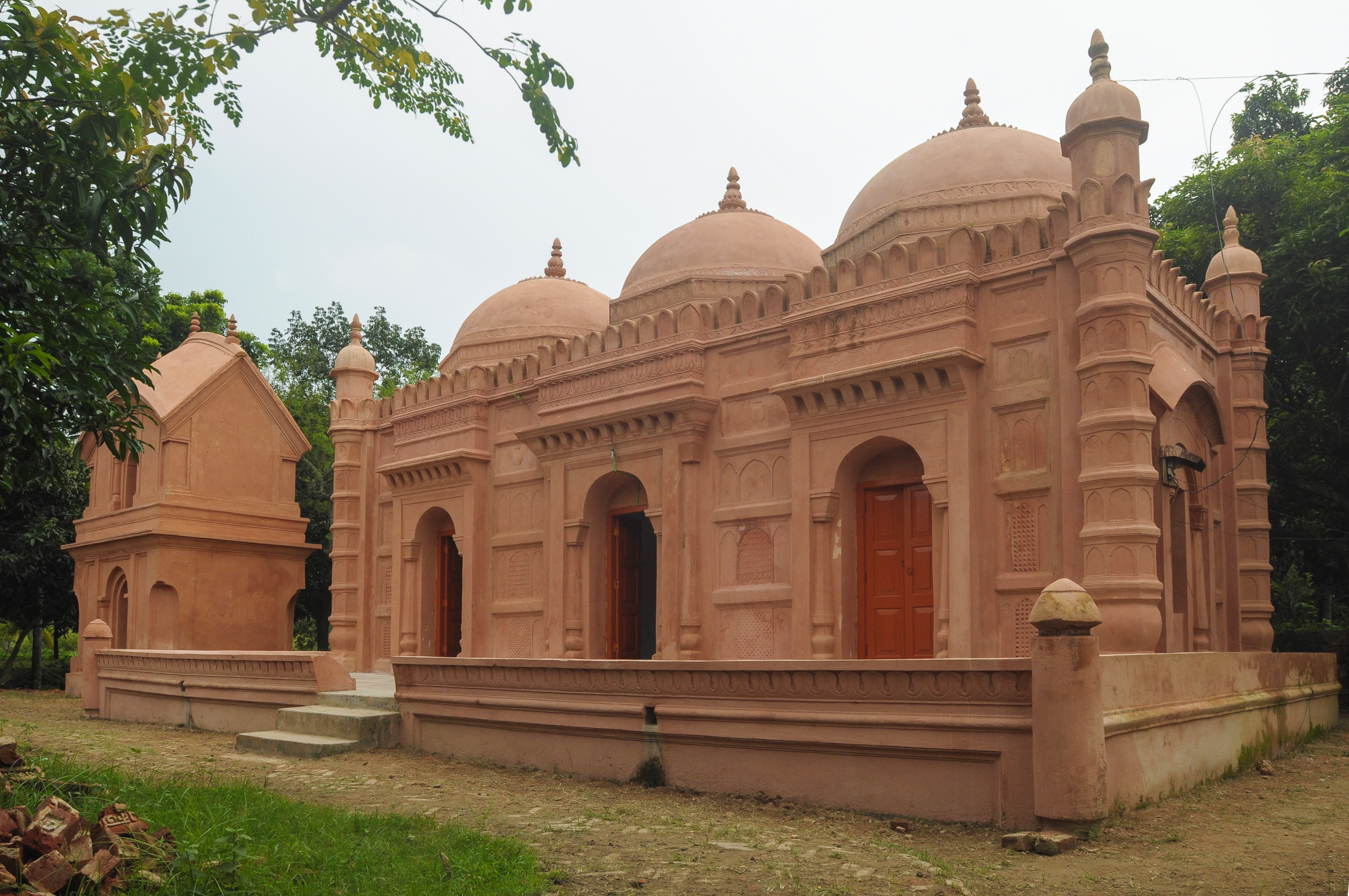

- Location of the mosque in Bangladesh

Religion
- Affiliation: Islam
- Ecclesiastical or organizational status: Mosque
- Status: Active

Location
- Location: Durgapur Upazila, Rajshahi
- Country: Bangladesh
- Interactive map of Kismat Maria Mosque
- Administration: Department of Archaeology
- Coordinates: 24°26′43″N 88°46′08″E

Architecture
- Type: Mosque architecture
- Completed: c. 1500 CE
- Dome: Three (maybe more)

The Kismat Maria Mosque (Bengali: কিসমত মারিয়া মসজিদ) is an ancient mosque located at the village of Maria, Durgapur Upazila of Rajshahi District in Bangladesh.

Built c. 1500 CE, the mosque is listed as a monument by the Bangladeshi Department of Archaeology. The small mosque is rectangular in shape and it has three entrances. There is a two-storey small building, known as Bibir Ghor, to the south of the mosque. The mosque is used for Friday Jumah prayers.

== See also ==
- Islam in Bangladesh
- List of mosques in Bangladesh
- List of archaeological sites in Bangladesh
