= Raihanul Haque =

Bangladeshi politician

Member of Bangladesh Parliament
- In office 2000–2001
- Preceded by: Md. Alauddin
- Succeeded by: Kabir Hossain

Personal details
- Party: Bangladesh Awami League

Raihanul Haque (Bengali: রায়হানুল হক) is a Bangladesh Awami League politician and a former member of parliament from Rajshahi-5.

== Early life ==
Haque was born in January 1959 in Chandanshahr, Charghat Upazila, Rajshahi District.

== Career ==
Haque was elected to parliament from Rajshahi-5 as a Bangladesh Awami League candidate in a by-election in 2000 following the death of the incumbent Md. Alauddin.
