= Shofiqul Haque Milon =

Bangladeshi politician (born 1968)

- শফিকুল হক মিলন
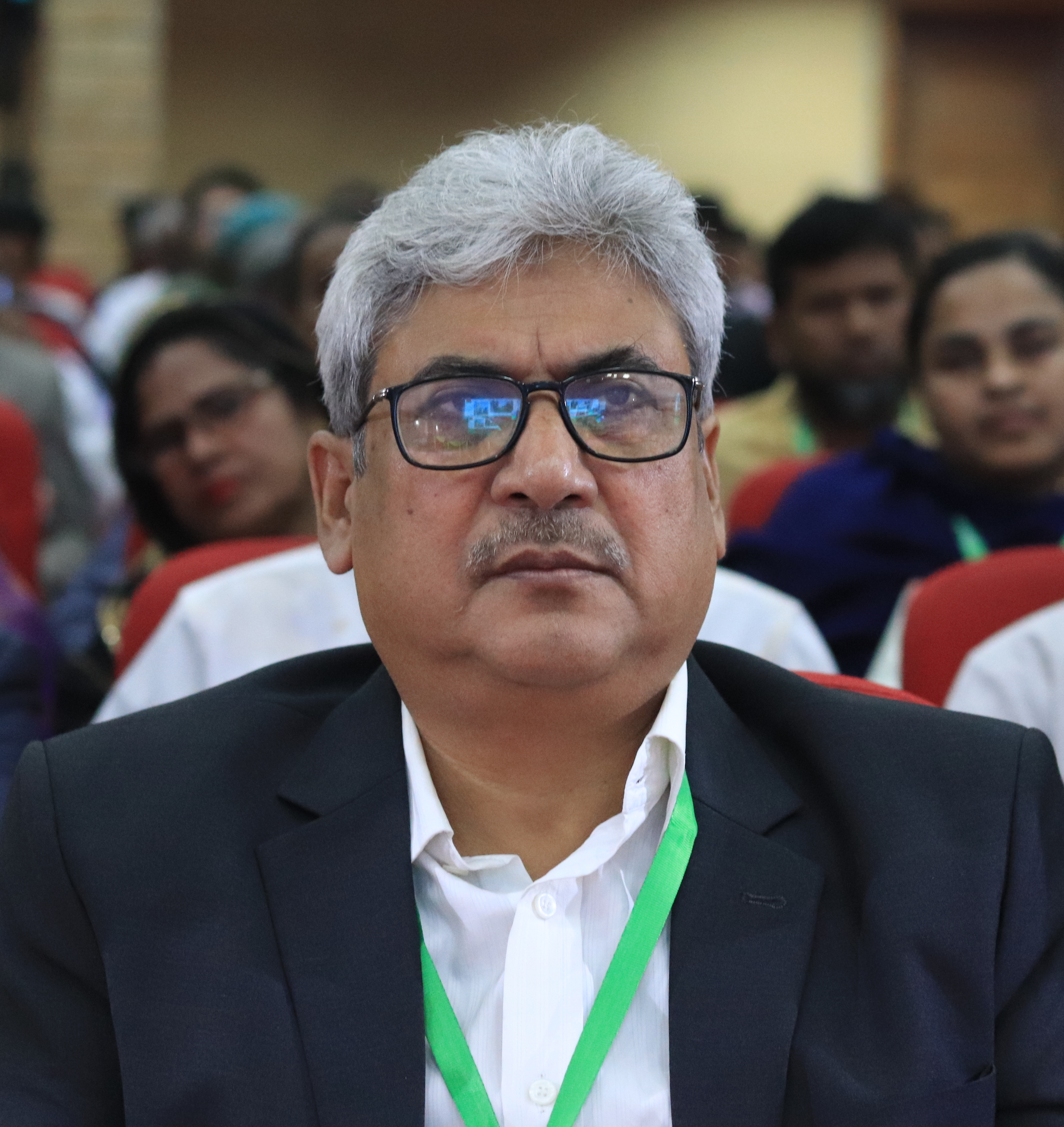
- Milon in 2024

Member of the Bangladesh Parliament for Rajshahi-3
- Incumbent
- Assumed office 17 February 2026
- Preceded by: Md Asaduzzaman Asad

Personal details
- Born: 27 September 1968 (age 58) Rajshahi, Bangladesh
- Party: Bangladesh Nationalist Party
- Education: University of Rajshahi
- Occupation: Lawyer and politician
- Website: advshofiqulhaquemilon.com

Shofiqul Haque Milon (born 27 September 1968) is a Bangladeshi lawyer and politician who was elected as a Member of Parliament for the Rajshahi-3 constituency as a candidate of the Bangladesh Nationalist Party with the party symbol Sheaf of Paddy in the 2026 Bangladeshi general election for the first time.

== Political activities ==
In the 13th National Parliament election, held on 12 February 2026, Shafiqul Haque Milon contested from the Rajshahi-3 (Paba–Mohanpur) constituency as a candidate of the Bangladesh Nationalist Party (BNP) under the party’s electoral symbol, the paddy sheaf. He received more than 176,000 votes and defeated Bangladesh Jamaat-e-Islami candidate Md. Abul Kalam Azad, who secured approximately 137,000 votes under the scales symbol.

== See also ==
- List of members of the 13th Jatiya Sangsad
