= Enamul Haque (engineer) =

Bangladeshi Politician

- এনামুল হক

Member of the Bangladesh Parliament for Rajshahi-4
- In office 29 December 2008 – 29 January 2024
- Preceded by: Nadim Mostafa
- Succeeded by: Abul Kalam Azad

Personal details
- Born: 21 October 1969 (age 56) Rajshahi, East Pakistan, Pakistan
- Party: Bangladesh Awami League
- Education: B.Sc. Engineering, MBA
- Profession: Agriculture and real estate business

Enamul Haque (born 21 October 1969) is a Bangladesh Awami League politician and a former Jatiya Sangsad member representing the Rajshahi-4 constituency during 2008–2024.

== Early life ==
Haque was born on 21 October 1969. He completed his undergraduate in engineering and also has an MBA.

== Career ==
Haque was elected to the Jatiya Sangsad from Rajshahi-4 in 2008 and on 5 January 2014 as a Bangladesh Awami League candidate.

On 16 September 2014, Bangladesh Anti-Corruption Commission (ACC) recommended charging him with corruption regarding his company, Ena Enterprise.

In January 2017, Haque criticized Iqbal Sobhan Chowdhury, the editor of The Daily Observer, after the newspaper published a report accusing Haque of being involved with the drug trade.

In September 2017, local Awami League leaders in Rajshahi accused him of fomenting divisions in the Awami League and creating fractional feuds.

In June 2020, Ayesha Akter Liza (aged 36–37) accused Haque of deception and forcefully aborting her fetus. She had claimed they got married on 30 April 2013 and registered on 11 May 2018. Haque acknowledged the marriage but claimed they got divorced on 23 April 2020.

In September 2024, ACC decided to launch an investigation into corruption allegations against Haque accusing him of money laundering, irregularities in projects, and illegally amassing wealth. He was arrested in September 2024.
