= The Alchemy of Happiness =

Book by Al-Ghazali

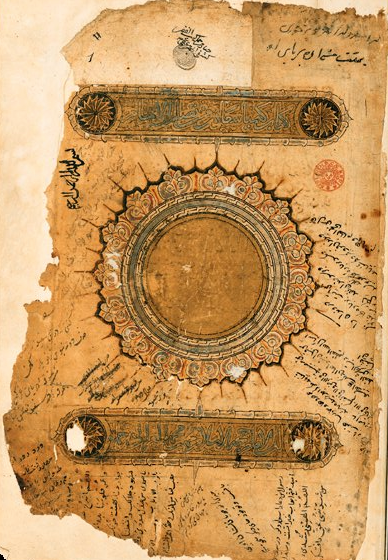
- Cover of a 1308 Persian copy held in the Bibliothèque nationale de France
- Author: Al-Ghazālī
- Original title: Kimiya-yi Sa'ādat (Persian: کیمیای سعادت)
- Translator: Muhammad Mustafa an-Nawali, Claud Field, Jay Crook
- Language: Classical Persian
- Subject: Islamic ethics and Philosophy
- Publication date: Early 12th century
- Publication place: Persia
- LC Class: B753.G33

Kīmīyā-yi Sa'ādat (Persian: کیمیای سعادت English: The Alchemy of Happiness/Contentment) is a book written by Abū Ḥāmid Muḥammad ibn Muḥammad al-Ghazālī, a Persian theologian, philosopher, and prolific Muslim author, often regarded as one of the greatest systematic thinkers and mystics of Islam, in Persian. The Kimiya-yi Sa'ādat was written towards the end of his life shortly before 499 AH/1105 AD. During the time before it was written, the Muslim world was considered to be in a state of political, as well as intellectual unrest. Al-Ghazālī, noted that there were constant disputes about the role of philosophy and scholastic theology, and that Sufis became chastised for their neglect of the ritual obligations of Islam. Upon the release of this book, the Kimiya-yi sa'ādat allowed al-Ghazali to considerably cut the tensions between the scholars and mystics. Kimiya-yi sa'ādat emphasized the importance of observing the ritual requirements of Islam, the actions that would lead to salvation, and avoidance of sin. The factor that set the Kimiya-yi sa'ādat apart from other theological works at the time was its mystical emphasis on self-discipline and asceticism.

== Structure ==
The Kimiya-yi Sa'ādat and its subsequent translations begin with citing some counsels of the Prophet. Overall, the Kimiya-yi sa'ādat has four principal parts of ten chapters each:

1. Ebādāt (religious duties)
2. Monjīāt (salvation)
3. Mu'amalat (human relations aspect of Islam)
4. Mohlekāt (damnation)

== Sa'āda ==
Sa'āda (happiness) is a central concept in Islamic philosophy used to describe the highest aim of human striving. Sa'āda is considered to be part of the "ultimate happiness", namely that of the hereafter. Only when a human being has liberated his/her soul completely from its corporal existence, and arrives at what is called "active intellect". Al-Ghazali believed in practical-ethical perfection and that by exercising his God-given capacity for reason man must be drawn to the spiritual alchemy that transforms the soul from worldliness to complete devotion to God. This alone, he believed, could produce ultimate happiness. Ghazālī's teachings were to help man to live a life in accordance with the sacred law, and by doing so gain a deeper understanding of its meaning on the Day of Judgement.

== Kimiya ==
Kimiya or Kimiā (Alchemy) is an applied and mystical science that has been studied for centuries. In its essence, Kimiā represents a complete conception of the universe and relations between earthly beings and the cosmos. Religious philosophers emphasized its importance as a religious discipline. Due to its spiritual dimensions Kimiā is considered the noblest of all occult sciences (i.e. astrology and various kinds of magic). Ghazali was himself a believer that everything on Earth is a manifestation of God's spirit, thus everything belongs to kimiā.

== Iḥyā′ 'Ulūm al-Dīn ==
It is a common misconception that the Kimiya-yi sa'ādat is a rewrite of the Iḥyā′ 'Ulūm al-Dīn. Iḥyā′ 'Ulūm al-Dīn was written by al-Ghazali after abandoning his duties as a professor due to a "spiritual crisis", which led him to live in seclusion for several years. It was composed in Arabic, and was an attempt to show ways in which the lives of a Sufi could be based on what is demanded by Islamic law. There are definite parallels between Iḥyā′ 'Ulūm al-Dīn and Kimiya-yi sa'ādat, however the four introductory chapters of the Kimiya-yi sa'ādat contain relevant theological discussions that set the two apart. The Kimiya-yi sa'ādat is noticeably shorter than the Iḥyā′ 'Ulūm al-Dīn, however in the original Persian introduction of the Kimiya-yi sa'ādat, Ghazālī explicitly states he wrote Kimiya-yi sa'ādat to mirror the essence of Iḥyā′ 'Ulūm al-Dīn and a few of his other theological writings; he wrote it in Persian so that it could reach a broader, popular audience in his homeland.

== Translation and editing ==
From its original Persian form the Kimiya-yi sa'ādat has been translated into Urdu, Turkish, Azerbaijani, and German. Husayn-Khadiv-i Jam edited the first half of the Persian text nearly two decades ago. This version is considered to be the most beneficial, as it improves upon the past editions by Ahmad Ahram and Muhammad Abbasi. It was translated into the Bengali language by Mirza Muhammad Yusuf Ali as Soubhaggô Spôrśômôṇi in 1895.

In 1910, Claud Field published an abridged translation of the Kimiya-yi Sa'ādat utilizing the Urdu translation of the Persian text as well as an earlier English paraphrase of a Turkish translation by Muhammad Mustafa an-Nawali. Elton L. Daniel, a professor of Islamic history at the University of Hawaii, compared the texts given to him by Claud Field to the Persian edition and reorganized the sequence of the chapters and paragraph divisions in order to get them to correlate better with the original Kimiya-yi Sa'ādat. He also added annotations indicating the areas in which Field's translation varies from the original Kimiya-yi Sa'ādat, where certain texts were omitted/condensed, and identifies many of the individuals and Qur'anic citations found in the text. The most recent translation of Kimiya-yi sa'ādat was published in 2008 and was translated by Jay Crook. Most scholars agree that nothing can compare to a complete and fresh translation from the original Persian text.

God has sent on Earth a hundred and twenty-four thousand prophets to teach men the prescription of this alchemy, and how to purify their hearts from baser qualities in the crucible of abstinence. This alchemy may be briefly described as turning away from the world, and its constituents are four: Knowledge of Self, Knowledge of God, Knowledge of this world as it really is, Knowledge of the next world as it really is.

== See also ==
- Persian literature
- Alchemy and chemistry in medieval Islam
