= Md Asaduzzaman Asad =

Bangladeshi politician (born 1966)

- আসাদুজ্জামান আসাদ

Member of the Bangladesh Parliament for Rajshahi-3
- In office 7 January 2024 – 6 August 2024
- Preceded by: Md. Ayeen Uddin
- Succeeded by: Shofiqul Haque Milon

Personal details
- Born: 2 July 1966 (age 60)
- Party: Awami League

Md Asaduzzaman Asad (born 2 July 1966) is an Awami League politician and a former Jatiya Sangsad member representing the Rajshahi-3 constituency.

== Career ==
Asad was elected to parliament from Rajshahi-3 as an Awami League candidate on 7 January 2024.

Asad was arrested by the Rapid Action Battalion from Baridhara on 6 October after the fall of the Sheikh Hasina-led Awami League government. His mother, Saleha Begum, aged 80, died on 2 June 2025, but security concerns prevented his release. He was allowed to see her face from a distance at the Rajshahi Central Jail gate.
