= Nazrul Islam Mondol =

Bangladeshi politician (born 1953)

- নজরুল ইসলাম মন্ডল

Member of the Bangladesh Parliament for Rajshahi-5
- Incumbent
- Assumed office 17 February 2026
- Preceded by: Mansur Rahman

Personal details
- Born: 15 February 1953 (age 73) Puthia Upazila, Rajshahi District, East Bengal
- Party: Bangladesh Nationalist Party
- Occupation: Businessman, politician, and teacher

Nazrul Islam Mondol (born 15 February 1953) is a Bangladeshi teacher, businessman, and politician who was elected as a member of parliament for the Rajshahi-5 constituency as a candidate of the Bangladesh Nationalist Party in the 2026 Bangladeshi general election for the first time.

== See also ==
- List of members of the 13th Jatiya Sangsad
