= Md. Alauddin =

Bangladesh Awami League politician

Member of Parliament for Rajshahi-14
- In office 7 March 1973 – 6 November 1976

Member of Parliament for Rajshahi-5
- In office 12 June 1996 – 26 February 2000
- Minister: Minister of Housing and Public Works
- Preceded by: Azizur Rahman
- Succeeded by: Raihanul Haque
- In office 1996 – 26 February 2000

Personal details
- Born: 7 January 1925
- Died: 26 February 2000 (aged 75)
- Party: Bangladesh Awami League

Md. Alauddin (7 January 1925 – 26 February 2000) was a Bangladesh Awami League politician and a member of parliament from Rajshahi-14 and Rajshahi-5.

== Career ==
Alauddin was elected to parliament from Rajshahi-5 as a Bangladesh Nationalist Party candidate in 1996, and joined the first Sheikh Hasina cabinet as a state minister. He subsequently lost his parliamentary membership for crossing over to a different party and was re-elected from Rajshahi-5 as a Bangladesh Awami League candidate.
