= Meraj Uddin Mollah =

Bangladeshi politician (c.1946–2021)

Member of Parliament for Rajshahi-3
- In office 29 December 2008 – 5 January 2014
- Preceded by: Abu Hena
- Succeeded by: Md. Ayeen Uddin

Personal details
- Born: c. 1946 Rajshahi District
- Died: 9 May 2021 (age 75) Dhaka
- Cause of death: COVID-19
- Party: Bangladesh Awami League

Meraj Uddin Mollah (c. 1946–9 May 2021) was a Bangladesh Awami League politician and a member of parliament for Rajshahi-3.

== Career ==
Mollah was elected to parliament from Rajshahi-3 as a Bangladesh Awami League candidate in 2008. In 2011, he served as the president of the Rajshahi District unit of the Bangladesh Awami League. His son was arrested for narcotics possession in 2013.
