= Rajshahi-5 =

Constituency of Bangladesh's Jatiya Sangsad

Coordinates: 24.37°N 88.84°E

- Constituency for the Jatiya Sangsad
- District: Rajshahi District
- Division: Rajshahi Division
- Electorate: 353,174 (2026)

Current constituency
- Created: 1973
- Party: Bangladesh Nationalist Party
- Member: Nazrul Islam Mondol
- ← 55 Rajshahi-4 57 Rajshahi-6 →

Rajshahi-5 is a constituency represented in the Jatiya Sangsad (National Parliament) of Bangladesh since 2026 by Nazrul Islam Mondol of the Bangladesh Nationalist Party.

== Boundaries ==
The constituency encompasses Durgapur and Puthia upazilas.

== History ==
The constituency was created for the first general elections in newly independent Bangladesh, held in 1973.

== Members of Parliament ==
Election	Member	Party
1973	Sardar Mohammad Jahangir	Awami League
1979	Mokhlechhar Rahman Chowdhury	Bangladesh Nationalist Party
Major Boundary Changes
1986	Nurun Nabi Chand	Awami League
1988	Nurun Nabi Chand	Jatiya Party
1991	Azizur Rahman	Bangladesh Nationalist Party
Jun 1996	Md. Alauddin	Bangladesh Nationalist Party
1999 by-election	Md. Alauddin	Awami League
2000 by-election	Raihanul Haque	Awami League
2001	Kabir Hossain	Bangladesh Nationalist Party
2008	Abdul Wadud	Awami League
2018	Mansur Rahman	Awami League
2024	Abdul Wadud	Awami League
2026	Nazrul Islam Mondol	Bangladesh Nationalist Party

== Elections ==
=== Elections in the 2020s ===
General election 2026: Rajshahi-5
Party	Candidate	Votes	%	±%
BNP	Nazrul Islam Mondol	153,425		
Jamaat	Manzoor Rahman	73,445		
Majority				
Turnout		241,607		
Registered electors		353,174		
BNP gain from AL				

=== Elections in the 2010s ===
Abdul Wadud Dara was re-elected unopposed in the 2014 general election after opposition parties withdrew their candidacies in a boycott of the election.

=== Elections in the 2000s ===
General Election 2008: Rajshahi-5
Party	Candidate	Votes	%	±%
AL	Abdul Wadud Dara	124,398	53.1	+24.9
BNP	Nazrul Islam	108,083	46.2	+0.8
LDP	S. M. Shafiul Azam	740	0.3	N/A
CPB	Abul Kalam Azad	612	0.2	N/A
BTF	Moktar Hossen	243	0.1	N/A
NPP	Showkat Hossen Khan	98	0.0	N/A
Majority		16,315	7.0	−10.1
Turnout		234,174	94.6	+8.8
AL gain from BNP				

General Election 2001: Rajshahi-5
Party	Candidate	Votes	%	±%
BNP	Kabir Hossain	88,173	45.4	
AL	Raihanul Haque	54,882	28.2	
Independent	Akkas Ali	33,134	17.1	
IJOF	Md. Makhlesur Rahman	11,753	6.1	
Independent	Azizur Rahman	6,223	3.2	
JSD	Nurul Islam	187	0.1	
Majority		33,291	17.1	
Turnout		194,352	85.8	
BNP gain from AL				

Md. Alauddin died in February 2000. Raihanul Haque was elected in a 2000 by-election

=== Elections in the 1990s ===
In 1998, Sheikh Hasina made Md. Alauddin a state minister in her government. This led to his expulsion from the BNP, and to the Election Commission declaring his seat vacant on 11 October 1999 under Article 70 of the Constitution, which penalizes floor-crossing. This triggered a by-election in late 1999, which Alauddin won as an Awami League candidate.

General Election June 1996: Rajshahi-5
Party	Candidate	Votes	%	±%
BNP	Md. Alauddin	65,594	41.3	+4.0
AL	Anisur Rahman	58,614	36.9	+1.5
JP(E)	Md. Azizul Alam	19,366	12.2	+0.5
Jamaat	Md. Abdul Mannan	14,688	9.2	−5.8
Jatiya Samajtantrik Dal-JSD	Nurul Islam	189	0.1	0.0
Independent	Md. Abdur Rashid Sarkar	129	0.1	N/A
Zaker Party	Md. Abdul Halim	115	0.1	−0.1
Majority		6,980	4.4	+2.5
Turnout		158,675	87.6	−11.1
BNP hold				

General Election 1991: Rajshahi-5
Party	Candidate	Votes	%	±%
BNP	Azizur Rahman	48,542	37.3	
AL	Md. Alauddin	46,116	35.4	
Jamaat	Md. Abdul Mannan	19,515	15.0	
JP(E)	Mohammad Nurun Nabi Chand	15,241	11.7	
Zaker Party	Md. Abdul Halim	303	0.2	
JSD	Muhammad Shafiur Rahman Shafi	277	0.2	
Jatiya Oikkya Front	Md. Fazle Rabbi	158	0.1	
Jatiya Samajtantrik Dal-JSD	Md. Ramzan Ali Sarder	153	0.1	
Majority		2,426	1.9	
Turnout		130,305	76.5	
BNP gain from AL				
