= Md. Ayeen Uddin =

Bangladeshi politician

- মোঃ আয়েন উদ্দিন

Member of Parliament for Rajshahi-3
- In office 5 January 2014 – 6 January 2024
- Preceded by: Meraj Uddin Mollah
- Succeeded by: Asaduzzaman Asad

Personal details
- Born: 10 December 1976 (age 49)
- Party: Bangladesh Awami League

Md. Ayeen Uddin (Bengali: মোঃ আয়েন উদ্দিন) is a Bangladesh Awami League politician and former member of parliament for Rajshahi-3.

== Early life ==
Uddin was born on 10 December 1976 in his ancestral home village Mahishkundi in Mohanpur upazila of Rajshahi district. He holds a master's degree in business administration. His father, Habir Mandal, was the 3rd member of The East Pakistan Peace Committee of Mahishkundi village in Ghasigram union of Mohanpur in Rajshahi district according to 'Ekattarer Mohanpur' written by Bablur Rahman.

== Career ==
Uddin has been involved in active politics since his student life. He was the general secretary of Rajshahi University Chhatra League. He was elected member of parliament for the Rajshahi-3 constituency as a candidate of Bangladesh Awami League in the 10th parliamentary election of 5 January 2014. On 5 January 2015, he was attacked with bombs by members of Jamaat-e-Islami Bangladesh at a rally in Rajshahi.

Uddin was elected member of parliament for the Rajshahi-3 constituency in the eleventh parliamentary election of 2018.

Ekattar TV published a report titled "Communal insults for seeking UP election nomination", which went viral overnight. Asking for the nomination of Raighati union, he told Suranjit Sarkar, president of Mohanpur upazila of Hindu-Buddhist-Christian Unity Parishad, "You are Hindu Jat, you are shala criminal." Suranjit was also abused by the MP.

Uddin is also accused of abusing power and occupying hundreds of bighas of crop land by waving red flags at will.
