= Abu Hena (Bangladeshi politician) =

Bangladeshi politician (c. 1939–2020)

- আবু হেনা

Member of Parliament for Rajshahi-3
- In office 14 July 1996 – 27 October 2006
- Preceded by: Sardar Amjad Hossain
- Succeeded by: Meraj Uddin Mollah

Personal details
- Born: c. 1939
- Died: 14 November 2020 Dhaka, Bangladesh
- Party: Bangladesh Nationalist Party

Abu Hena (c. 1939 - 14 November 2020) was a Bangladesh Nationalist Party politician and a member of parliament for Rajshahi-3.

== Career ==
Hena was elected to parliament from Rajshahi-3 as a Bangladesh Nationalist Party candidate in June 1996 and 2001. He was expelled from the Bangladesh Nationalist Party for criticizing the party for not tackling Islamic extremism.

Hena died from COVID-19 on 14 November 2020, at a hospital in Shyamoli, Dhaka.
