= Mohanpur Upazila =

Mohanpur Upazila মোহনপুর উপজেলা
- Upazila of Bangladesh
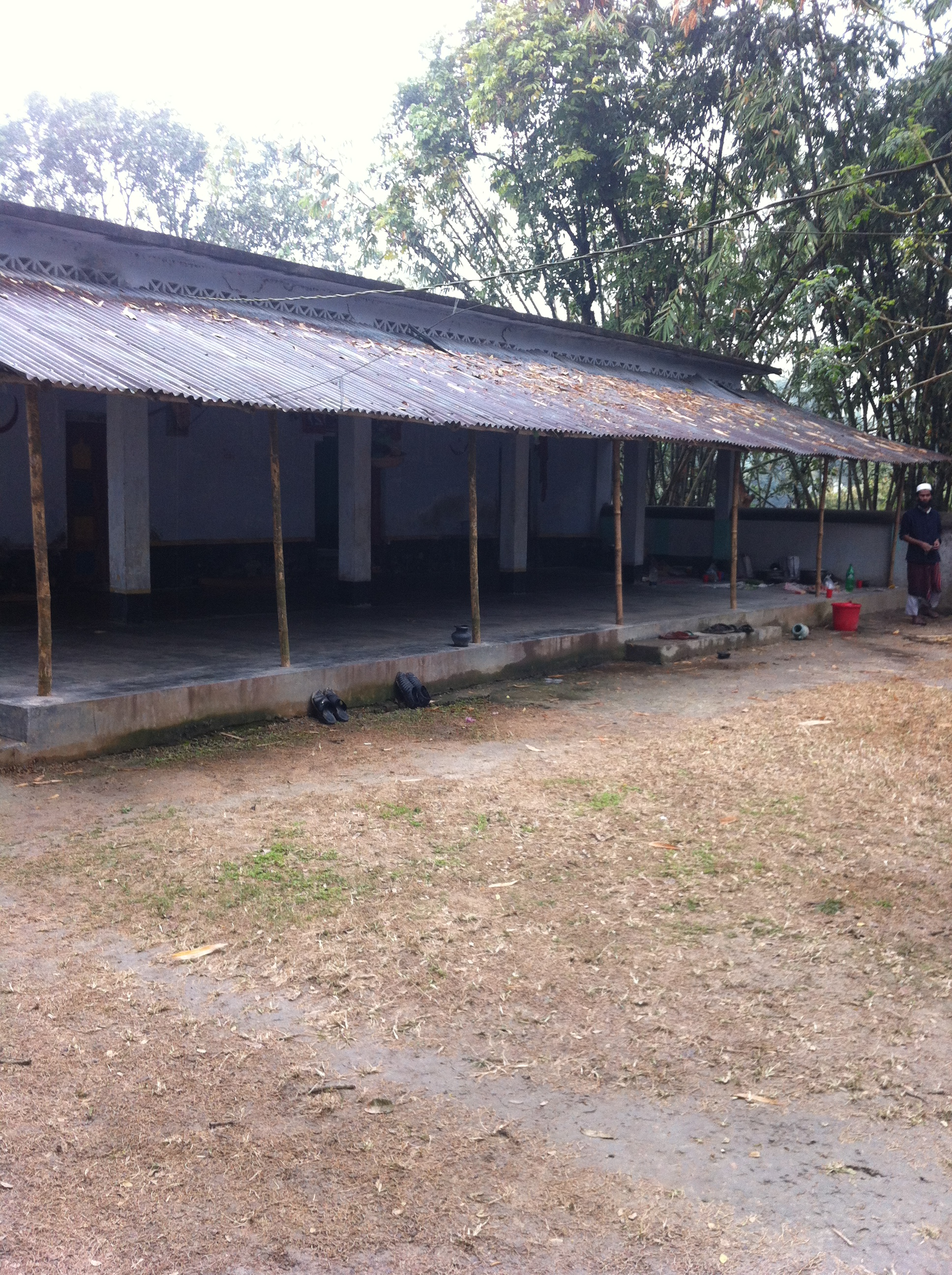
- Bakshail Purbo Para Jame Masjid in Bakshali village, Mohanpur Upazila, Rajshahi

- Coordinates: 24°33.8′N 88°39′E
- Country: Bangladesh
- Division: Rajshahi
- District: Rajshahi

Area
  - Total: 162.65 km^{2} (62.80 sq mi)

Population (2022)
  - Total: 186,904
  - Density: 1,149.1/km^{2} (2,976.2/sq mi)
- Time zone: UTC+6 (BST)
- Postal code: 6220
- Website: Official Map of Mohanpur

Mohanpur Upazila mauza geocode map

Mohanpur Upazila (Bengali: মোহনপুর উপজেলা) is an upazila of Rajshahi District in Rajshahi Division, Bangladesh.

== Geography ==
Mohanpur is located at 24.5639°N 88.6500°E. It is 25 km away from Rajshahi district headquarter. It has a total area of 162.65 km^{2}. The Postal Code is 6220. It is surrounded by Tanore Upazila of Rajshahi District and Manda Upazila of Naogaon District to the north, Bagmara Upazila to the east, Paba Upazila and Durgapur Upazila to the south, Tanore Upazila to the west.

== History ==
Mohanpur Thana was formed in 1917 and it was turned into an upazila in 1983.

=== Independence War ===
The local Razakars established a camp in a madrasa at village Sankoa and conducted mass torture to the families of pro-independence fighters and other people of the nearby localities. The Razakars killed fighter Abdul Aziz in his residence at village Bihatra; they also sacked his house. In November the pro-independence fighters launched an attack on the Razakar camp and killed six Razakars.

== Demographics ==
Religions in Mohanpur Upazila (2022)
Religion	Percent
Islam	97.27%
Hinduism	2.48%
Other or not stated	0.25%

According to the 2022 Bangladeshi census, Mohanpur Upazila had 52,681 households and a population of 186,904. 8.15% of the population were under 5 years of age. Mohanpur had a literacy rate (age 7 and over) of 73.88%: 77.82% for males and 69.97% for females, and a sex ratio of 99.77 males for every 100 females. 33,976 (18.18%) lived in urban areas.

According to the 2011 Census of Bangladesh, Mohanpur Upazila had 43,984 households and a population of 170,021. 31,622 (18.60%) were under 10 years of age. Mohanpur had a literacy rate (age 7 and over) of 51.25%, compared to the national average of 51.8%, and a sex ratio of 995 females per 1000 males. 29,860 (17.56%) lived in urban areas. Ethnic population was 1,223 (0.72%)

== Administration ==
Mohanpur Upazila is divided into Kesharhat Municipality and six union parishads: Bakshimail, Dhurail, Ghasigram, Jahanabad, Maugachhi, and Rayghati. The union parishads are subdivided into 167 mauzas and 138 villages.

== Education ==
The Literacy Rate of Mohanpur upazila is 51.3% (males 55.3% and females 47.2%) (7+ years). There are 82 primary schools, 52 high/junior-high schools (2 government school), 21 colleges and 21 madrasas.

== Economy ==
The economy of Rajshahi is predominantly agricultural. The main crops of this sub-district are Paddy, wheat, jute, sugarcane, turmeric, oil seed, onion, garlic, potato, betel leaf. Betel leaf of this area is very much famous in all over the country. The main fruits produced in the region are mango, jack-fruit, banana, litchi, black berry, coconut, palm, kul, guava and papaya. Rice is the staple food of the people of this area.

== See also ==
- Upazilas of Bangladesh
- Districts of Bangladesh
- Divisions of Bangladesh
- Administrative geography of Bangladesh
