= Abdus Sattar Mondal =

Bangladeshi politician

Abdus Sattar Mondal (Bengali: আবদুস সাত্তার মন্ডল; born 1945) is a Bangladeshi politician who was a member of parliament from 1979 to 1984, and from February to March 1996.

== Biography ==
In the 1979 general election Mondal was elected member of parliament for constituency Rajshahi-13 on the Bangladesh Nationalist Party (BNP) ticket.

He was the BNP candidate for what, after renumbering, was constituency Rajshahi-4 in the 1991 general election, but finished third behind the Awami League and Bangladesh Muslim League candidates. In the widely boycotted February 1996 general election he was elected as the BNP candidate for constituency Rajshahi-4.

== See also ==
- Politics of Bangladesh
