= Mohammad Nurun Nabi Chand =

Bangladeshi politician

Member of Bangladesh Parliament

Personal details
- Party: Jatiya Party (Ershad)

Mohammad Nurun Nabi Chand is a Jatiya Party (Ershad) politician and a former member of parliament from the Rajshahi-5 constituency.

== Career ==
Chand was elected to parliament from Rajshahi-5 as a Jatiya Party candidate in 1986 and 1988.
