= Chapai Nawabganj Sadar Upazila =

Nawabganj Sadar নবাবগঞ্জ সদর
- Upazila
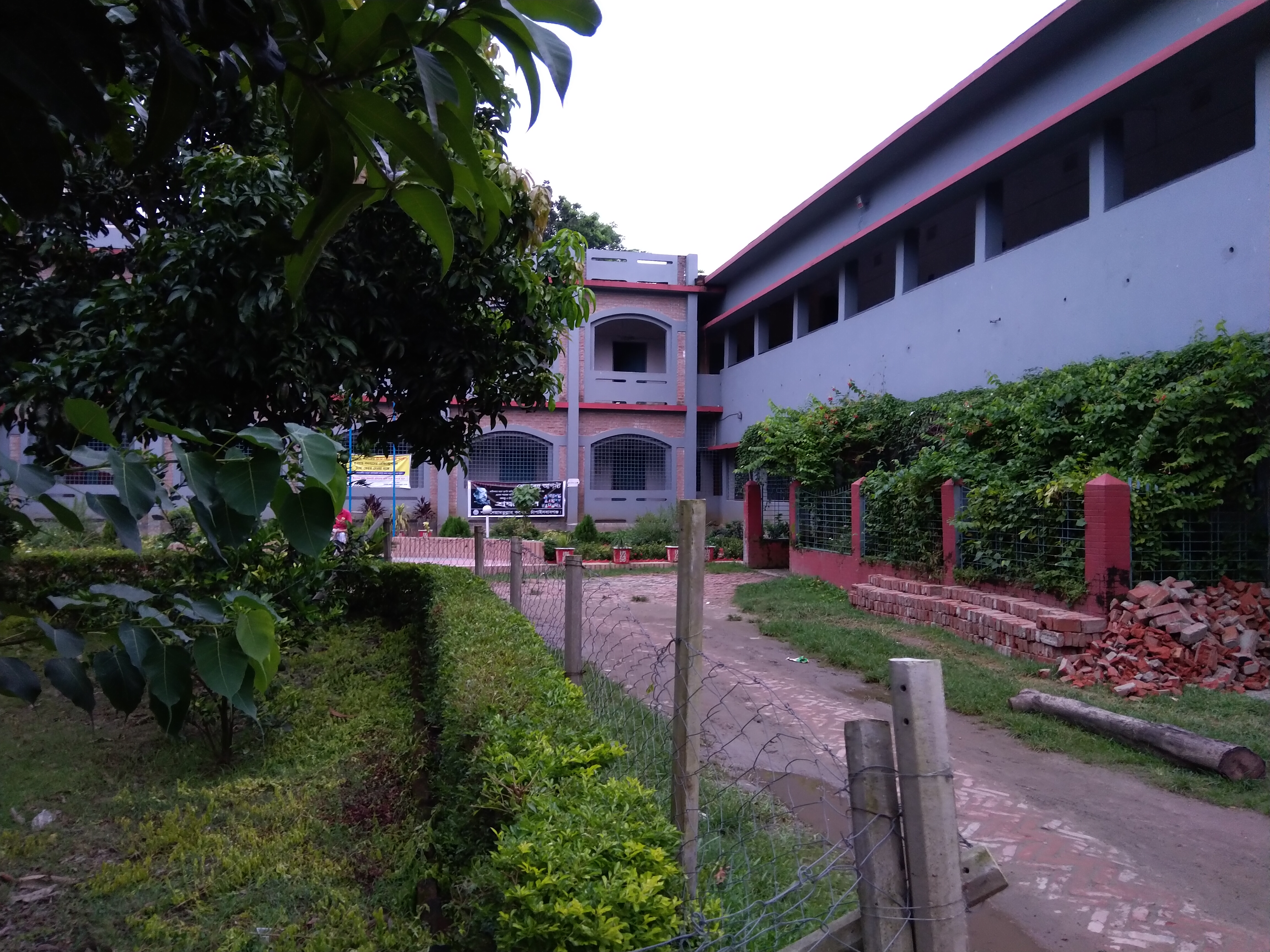
- Shah Neamotullah Degree College, Chapai Nawabganj

- Coordinates: 24°36′N 88°16′E
- Country: Bangladesh
- Division: Rajshahi
- District: Chapai Nawabganj
- Headquarters: Chapai Nawabganj

Area
  - Total: 451.8 km^{2} (174.4 sq mi)

Population (2022)
  - Total: 583,475
  - Density: 1,291/km^{2} (3,345/sq mi)
- Time zone: UTC+6 (BST)
- Postal code: 6300
- Area code: 0781
- Website: Official Map of Nawabganj Sadar

Chapai Nawabganj Sadar Upazila mauza geocode map

Chapai Nawabganj Sadar (Bengali: চাঁপাই নবাবগঞ্জ সদর) is an upazila of Chapai Nawabganj District in the Division of Rajshahi, Bangladesh.

== Geography ==
Chapai Nawabganj Sadar is located at 24.6000°N 88.2667°E. It has 112,748 households and total area 451.8 km^{2}.

Chapai Nawabganj Sadar Upazila is bounded by Shibganj, Chapai Nawabganj and Nachole Upazilas on the north, Tanore and Godagari Upazilas, in Rajshahi District, on the east, Samserganj, Suti I, Suti II, Raghunathganj II and Lalgola CD Blocks, in Murshidabad district, West Bengal, India, all across the Ganges/ Padma, on the south, and Shibganj Upazila, Chapai Nawabganj on the west.

== Demographics ==
Religions in Chapai Nawabganj Sadar Upazila (2022)
Religion	Percent
Islam	95.73%
Hinduism	3.93%
Other or not stated	0.34%

According to the 2022 Bangladeshi census, Chapainawabganj Sadar Upazila had 141,030 households and a population of 583,475. 11.02% of the population were under 5 years of age. Chapainawabganj Sadar had a literacy rate (age 7 and over) of 74.23%: 72.99% for males and 75.29% for females, and a sex ratio of 88.39 males for every 100 females. 261,890 (44.88%) lived in urban areas. Ethnic population was 2,419 (0.41%).

According to the 2011 Census of Bangladesh, Chapai Nawabganj Sadar Upazila had 112,748 households and a population of 530,592. 125,623 (23.68%) were under 10 years of age. Chapai Nawabganj Sadar had a literacy rate (age 7 and over) of 46.30%, compared to the national average of 51.8%, and a sex ratio of 1084 females per 1000 males. 180,731 (34.06%) lived in urban areas. Ethnic population was 1,578.

As of the 1991 Bangladesh census, Nawabganj Sadar has a population of 389524. Males constitute 50.39% of the population, and females 49.61%. This Upazila's eighteen up population is 187893. Nawabganj Sadar has an average literacy rate of 27.1% (7+ years), and the national average of 32.4% literate.

== Administration ==
Chapai Nawabganj Sadar Upazila is divided into Nawabganj Municipality and 14 union parishads: Alatuli, Baliadanga, Baroghoria, Charaunupnagar, Charbagdanga, Debinagar, Gobratola, Islampur, Jhilim, Moharajpur, Narayanpur, Ranihati, Shahjahanpur, and Sundarpur. The union parishads are subdivided into 174 mauzas and 203 villages.

Nawabganj Town (Municipality) is subdivided into 15 wards and 82 mahallas.

== Education ==
According to Banglapedia, Harimohon Government High School, founded in 1895, is a notable secondary school.

== See also ==
- Upazilas of Bangladesh
- Districts of Bangladesh
- Divisions of Bangladesh
