= Latifur Rahman (politician) =

Bangladeshi politician

Latifur Rahman is a politician of the Bangladesh Jamaat-e-Islami.

== Career ==
Ahmed was elected to parliament from Chapai Nawabganj-3 as a Bangladesh Jamaat-e-Islami candidate in 1986 and 1991. He was defeated by participating in the national elections of the 12 June 1996, 2001 and 2008 Bangladeshi general election as a Jamaat-e-Islami candidate.
