= Paba Upazila =

Paba Upazila পবা উপজেলা
- Upazila
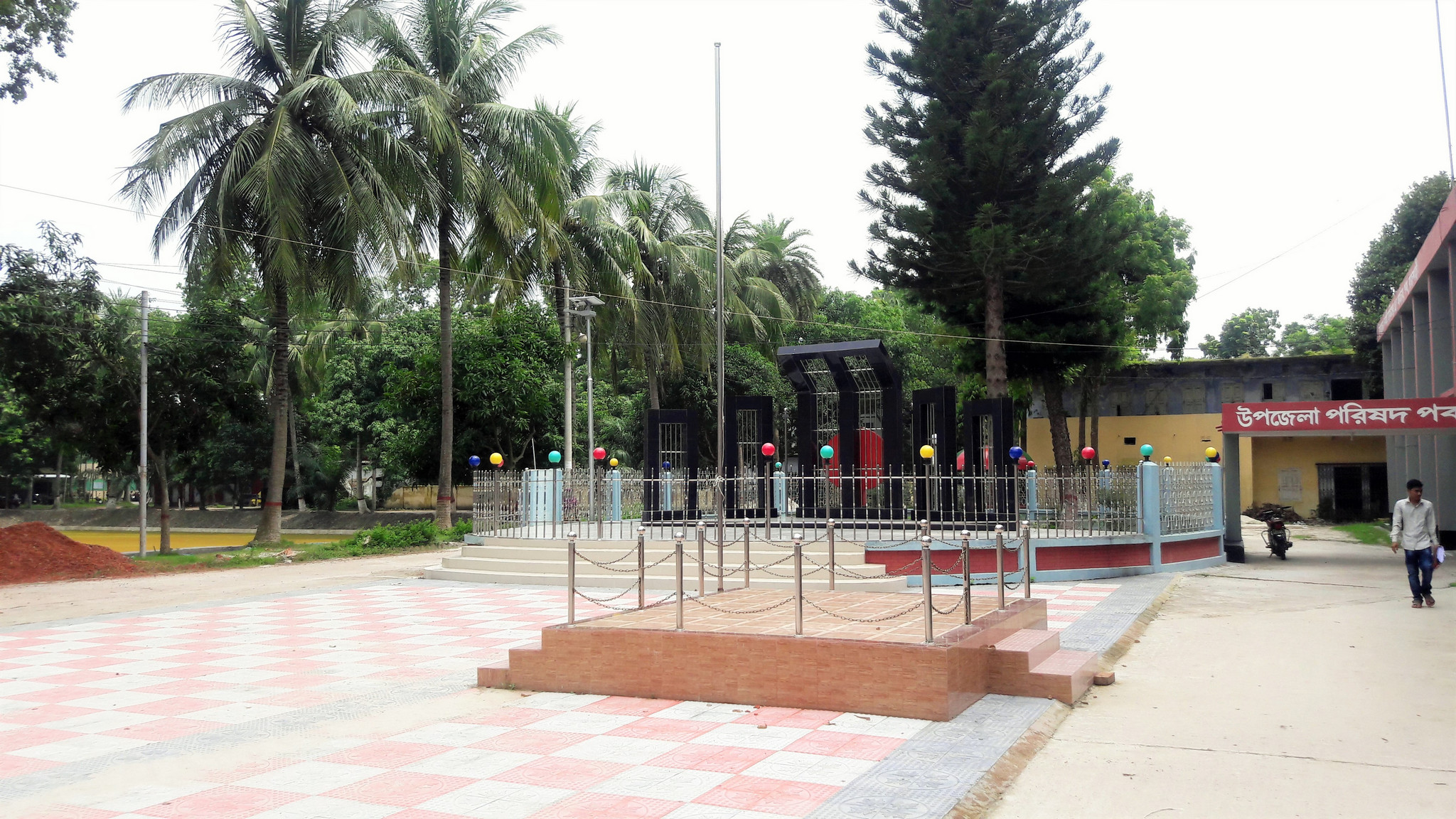
- Shaheed Minar in Paba Upazila

- Coordinates: 24°26.5′N 88°37.7′E
- Country: Bangladesh
- Division: Rajshahi
- District: Rajshahi

Area
  - Total: 340.03 km^{2} (131.29 sq mi)

Population (2022)
  - Total: 368,889
  - Density: 1,084.9/km^{2} (2,809.8/sq mi)
- Time zone: UTC+6 (BST)
- Website: Official Map of Paba

Paba Upazila mauza geocode map

Paba Upazila (Bengali: পবা উপজেলা) is an upazila of Rajshahi District in the Division of Rajshahi, Bangladesh.

== Geography ==
Paba is located at 24.4417°N 88.6278°E. It has 76,622 households and an area of 340.03km^{2}.

Paba Upazila is bounded by Mohanpur and Tanore Upazilas on the north, Puthia and Durgapur upazilas on the east, Bhagawangola II and Raninagar II CD Blocks, in Murshidabad district, West Bengal, India, across the Padma, and Charghat Upazila, on the south, and Godagari Upazila on the west.

== Demographics ==
Religions in Paba Upazila (2022)
Religion	Percent
Islam	97.18%
Hinduism	1.81%
Christianity	0.97%
Other or not stated	0.04%

According to the 2022 Bangladeshi census, Paba Upazila had 97,204 households and a population of 368,889. 8.41% of the population were under 5 years of age. Paba had a literacy rate (age 7 and over) of 74.72%: 76.15% for males and 73.26% for females, and a sex ratio of 102.16 males for every 100 females. 115,699 (31.36%) lived in urban areas. Ethnic population was 4012 (1.09%), of which Santal were 1861 and Mal Paharia were 1621.

According to the 2011 Census of Bangladesh, Paba Upazila had 76,622 households and a population of 314,196. 62,379 (19.85%) were under 10 years of age. Paba had a literacy rate (age 7 and over) of 50.31%, compared to the national average of 51.8%, and a sex ratio of 970 females per 1000 males. 85,732 (27.29%) lived in urban areas. Ethnic population was 2,913 (0.93%).

According to the 1991 Bangladesh census, Paba had a population of 213,379, of whom 108,810 were aged 18 or over. Males constituted 51.7% of the population, and females 48.3%. Paba had an average literacy rate of 25.1% (7+ years), against the national average of 32.4%.

== Administration ==
Paba Upazila is divided into Katakhali Municipality, Nowhata Municipality, and eight union parishads: Baragachhi, Damkura, Darshan Para, Haragram, Harian, Haripur, Hujuri Para, and Parila. The union parishads are subdivided into 186 mauzas and 209 villages.

== See also ==
- Upazilas of Bangladesh
- Districts of Bangladesh
- Divisions of Bangladesh
- Rajshahi Metropolitan Police
