= Sardar Amjad Hossain =

Bangladeshi politician

Member of Bangladesh Parliament

Personal details
- Born: 1 January 1940 Hamirkutsa village, Bagmara thana, Rajshahi District, British India
- Died: 19 December 2015 (aged 75) Dhaka, Bangladesh
- Party: Jatiya Party (Ershad)

Sardar Amjad Hossain (1940–2015) was a Jatiya Party (Ershad) politician and member of parliament for Rajshahi-3.

== Early life ==
Hossain was born on 1 January 1940 in Hamirkutsa village, Bagmara Upazila, Rajshahi District.

== Career ==
Hossain was elected to the National Assembly of Pakistan in 1970 on an Awami League nomination. In 1975, he served as the organising secretary of BAKSAL. He joined the Jatiya Party in 1986. He was elected to parliament from Rajshahi-3 as a Jatiya Party candidate in 1986 and 1988. He served as the minister of land, the minister of food, minister of agriculture, and the minister of fisheries and livestock in the cabinet of Hussain Mohammad Ershad. He campaigned for Ershad's release after he was removed from power and imprisoned. He returned to the Bangladesh Awami League in 2005.

== Death ==
Hossain died on 19 December 2014 in Apollo Hospital, Dhaka, Bangladesh.
