= Chapai Nawabganj =

- City
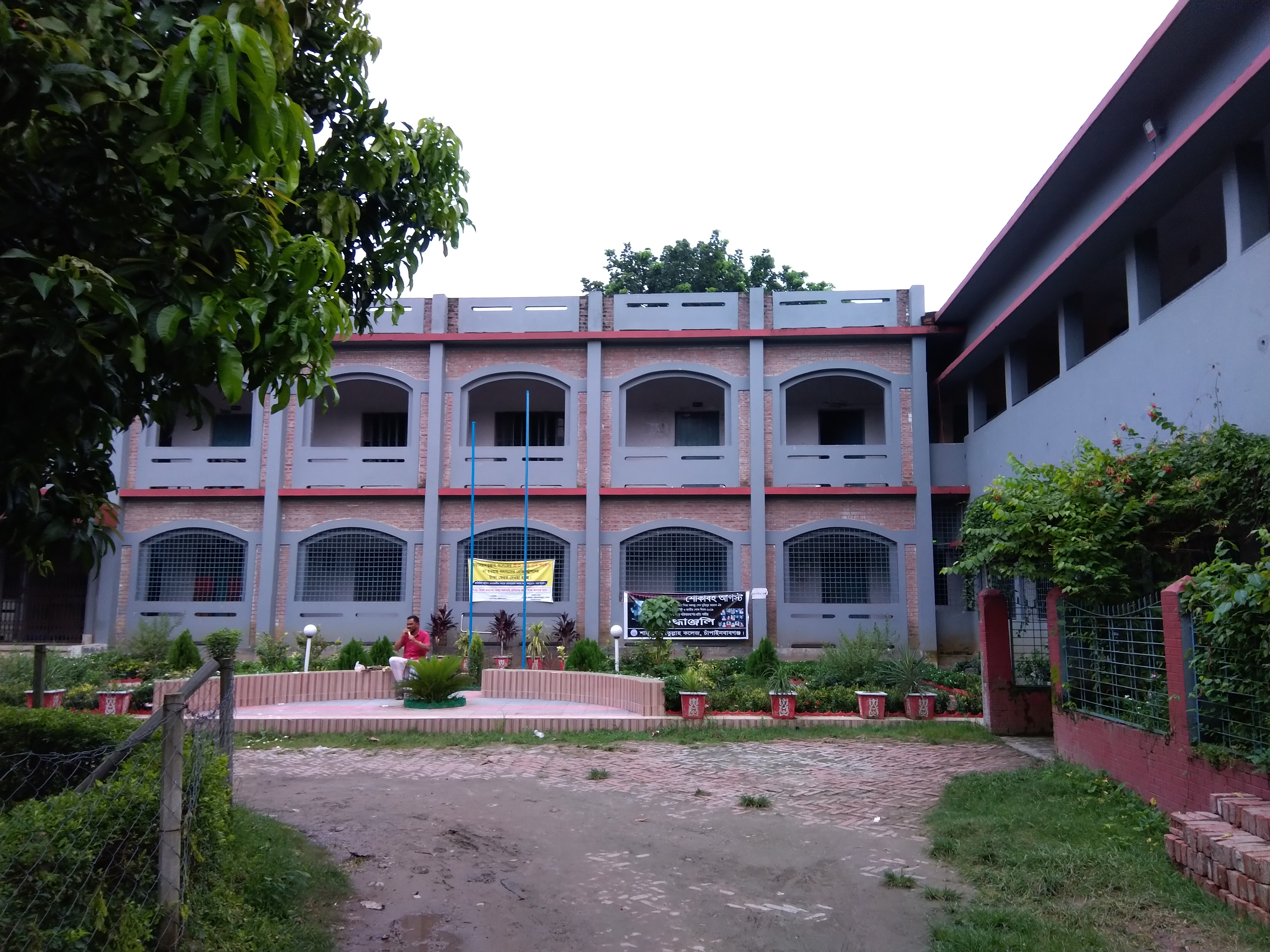
- Shah Niamatullah Degree College

- Location in Bangladesh Chapai Nawabganj (Bangladesh)
- Coordinates: 24°35′28″N 88°16′08″E
- Country: Bangladesh
- Division: Rajshahi
- District: Chapai Nawabganj
- Upazila: Chapai Nawabganj Sadar

Government
  - Type: Mayor-Council
  - Body: Chapai Nawabganj Municipality
  - Mayor: Md. Mokhlesur Rahman

Area
  - Total: 32.90 km^{2} (12.70 sq mi)

Population (2022)
  - Total: 201,000
  - Density: 6,110/km^{2} (15,800/sq mi)
- Time zone: UTC+6 (Bangladesh Time)
- Postal code: 6300
- National Dialing Code: +880
- Local Dialing Code: 781

Chapai Nawabganj is a City in north-western Bangladesh. It is the headquarters of both Chapai Nawabganj Sadar Upazila and Chapai Nawabganj District in Rajshahi Division. It is located on the banks of the Mahananda River. This city has a population of about 201,000. Which makes it the 24th largest city in Bangladesh.

== Etymology ==
It is believed the name 'Nawabganj' derives from its status as a favourite hunting ground of the Nawabs of Bengal. There are several theories about how the name 'Chapai' was attached to it.

One claims that in a nearby village, a beautiful girl named Champarani or Champabai lived who was a favourite of the Nawabs. Another claims that the region was Champak, the capital of King Lakhindra, who was loved by Behula in the Manasamangal Kāvya.

== Demographics ==
Religions in Chapai Nawabganj Paurashava (2022)
Religion	Percent
Islam	96.58%
Hinduism	3.38%
Other or not stated	0.04%

According to the 2022 Bangladesh census, Chapai Nawabganj Paurashava had 49,587 households and a population of 201,005. Chapai Nawabganj had a literacy rate of 74.23%: 72.99% for males and 75.29% for females, and a sex ratio of 89.15 males per 100 females. 9.04% of the population was under 5 years of age.

According to the 2011 Bangladesh census, Chapai Nawabganj city had 39,422 households and a population of 180,731. 35,936 (19.88%) were under 10 years of age. Chapai Nawabganj had a literacy rate (age 7 and over) of 60.84%, compared to the national average of 51.8%, and a sex ratio of 1101 females per 1000 males.
