= Mansur Rahman =

Bangladeshi politician

Member of Bangladesh Parliament

Personal details
- Party: Bangladesh Awami League

Mansur Rahman (Bengali: মনসুর রহমান; born October 31, 1954) is a Bangladesh Awami League politician and a former member of parliament for Rajshahi-5.

== Career ==
Rahman was elected to parliament from Rajshahi-5 as a Bangladesh Awami League candidate on 30 December 2018.
