= Durgapur Upazila, Rajshahi =

Durgapur Upazila দূর্গাপুর উপজেলা
- Upazila of Bangladesh
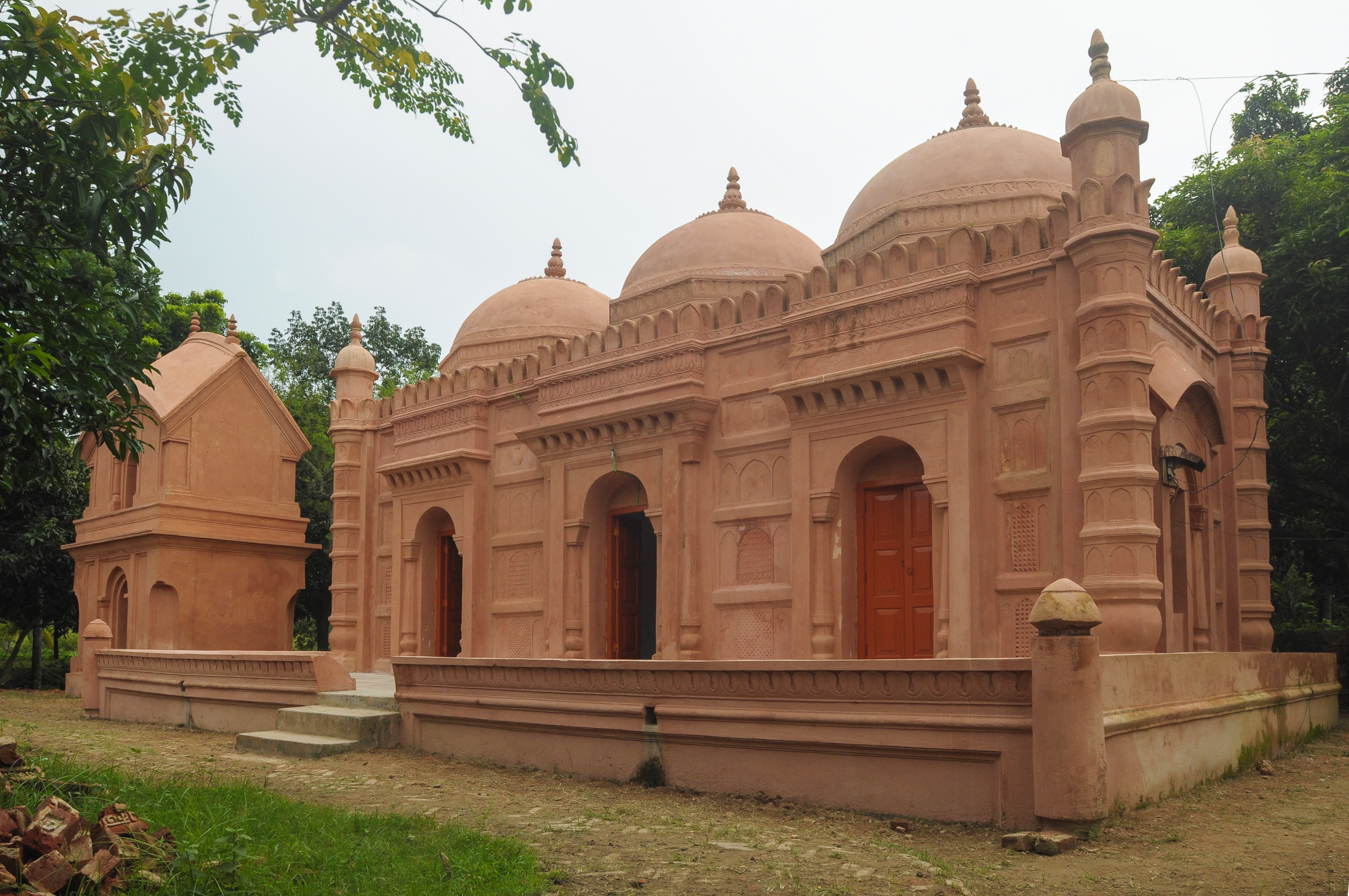
- Kismat Maria Mosque, Durgapur, Rajshahi

- Coordinates: 24°27.3′N 88°46′E
- Country: Bangladesh
- Division: Rajshahi
- District: Rajshahi

Government
  - MP (Rajshahi-5): Mansur Rahman
  - Upazila Chairman: Md Nazrul Islam

Area
  - Total: 197.89 km^{2} (76.41 sq mi)

Population (2022)
  - Total: 197,713
  - Density: 999.11/km^{2} (2,587.7/sq mi)
- Demonym: Durgapuri
- Time zone: UTC+6 (BST)
- Postal code: 6240
- Website: durgapur.rajshahi.gov.bd

Durgapur Upazila (Bengali: দূর্গাপুর উপজেলা) is an upazila of the Rajshahi District, Rajshahi Division, Bangladesh. It is named after the town of Durgapur.

== History ==
The area covered by the Durgapur Upazila is closely located to Lakhnauti, the capital city of medieval Bengal, and as a result contains sites connected to the Sultanate of Bengal. In c. 1500, the Qismat Maria mosque complex was constructed in Durgapur Upazila's Maria village. Among the 456 mosques and 125 eidgahs of Durgapur Upazila, other historic examples include the one-domed Ruipara Jame Mosque from the 16th century and the five-domed Panchubari Jame Mosque. The Panchubari mosque in Jaygirpara was established by a silk businessman known as Bhadu Pramanik and is bounded on the north by the huge Angra Beel and on the south by the river Malch. A Sufi pir popularly known as Kalachand Shah was based in this area and he is buried in a mausoleum in Hathkanpara Bazar, Jainagar Union. In the 19th century, a Sufi murshid known as Hazrat Shah Shafi Qazi Rafiuddin bin Kafiluddin al-Chishti (1882–1996) of Dhardiyar, Kushtia arrived to Durgapur where many murids gave bay'ah to him. His mazar is located in Jhaluka.

The British Raj officially established a thana in Durgapur in 1909. During the Bangladesh War of 1971, a battle took place between the Bengali fighters and the Pakistan Army at the village of Kabasmul on the border between Durgapur and Paba upazilas. The army major was killed and as a response the army massacred 44 villagers in the villages of Gaganbaria and Palsa. Durgapur Thana was upgraded to upazila (sub-district) in 1984 as part of President Hussain Muhammad Ershad's decentralisation programme.

== Geography ==
Durgapur is located at 24.4556°N 88.7667°E. It has a total area of 197.89 km².

== Demographics ==
Historical population
Year	Pop. (000)	±%
1981	111	—
1991	138	+24.3%
2001	168	+21.7%
2011	186	+10.7%
2022	198	+6.5%
Source: Bangladesh Bureau of Statistics

Religions in Durgapur Upazila (2022)
Religion	Percent
Islam	97.32%
Hinduism	2.35%
Other or not stated	0.33%

According to the 2022 Bangladeshi census, Durgapur Upazila had 56,331 households and a population of 197,713. 7.54% of the population were under 5 years of age. Durgapur had a literacy rate (age 7 and over) of 69.57%: 73.47% for males and 65.75% for females, and a sex ratio of 99.13 males for every 100 females. 39,672 (20.07%) lived in urban areas.

According to the 2011 Census of Bangladesh, Durgapur Upazila had 48,530 households and a population of 185,845. 32,588 (17.54%) were under 10 years of age. Durgapur had a literacy rate (age 7 and over) of 48.23%, compared to the national average of 51.8%, and a sex ratio of 987 females per 1,000 males. 28,119 (15.13%) lived in urban areas. Ethnic population was 1,106 (0.60%).

== Administration ==
Durgapur has 7 unions/wards, 114 mauzas/mahallas, and 122 villages.

=== List of chairmen ===
List of Upazila chairmen
Name	Term	Notes
Mullah Abdul Wahid	25/5/1985 - 24/5/1990	
Tazlul Islam Md Faruq	25/5/1990 - 9/5/1991	
Md Abdul Majid Sardar	22/2/2009 - 29/8/2012	
Musammat Banesa Begum	5/9/2012 - 10/11/2012	Acting
Md Abdul Majid Sardar	11/11/2012 - 29/4/2014	
Md Nazrul Islam	30/4/2014 - present	

== Notable people ==
- Mirza Muhammad Yusuf Ali (1858–1920), author and social activist
- Mansur Rahman (born 1954), parliamentarian

== See also ==
- Upazilas of Bangladesh
- Districts of Bangladesh
- Divisions of Bangladesh
- Administrative geography of Bangladesh
