= Md. Shamsul Haque =

Bangladeshi politician

- মোঃ শামসুল হক
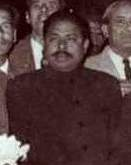

Member of Parliament for Mymensingh-2
- In office 14 July 1996 – 13 July 2001
- Succeeded by: Shah Shahid Sarwar
- In office 5 March 1991 – 24 November 1995
- Succeeded by: Abul Basar Akand
- In office 10 July 1986 – 6 December 1987
- Preceded by: Ismail Hossain Talukder
- Succeeded by: Rajab Ali Fakir

Member of Parliament for Mymensingh-15
- In office 7 April 1973 – 6 November 1975
- Preceded by: Position created
- Succeeded by: Ashraf Uddin Khan

Personal details
- Born: 29 January 1930 Mymensingh, Bengal Presidency, British India
- Died: 27 May 2005 (aged 75)
- Party: Bangladesh Awami League

Md. Shamsul Haque (29 January 1930 – 27 May 2005) was a Bangladesh Awami League politician and a Jatiya Sangsad member representing the Mymensingh-2 and Mymensingh-15 constituencies. He was elected to parliament from Mymensingh-2 as a Bangladesh Awami League candidate in 1991 and 1996.

Shamsul Haque was awarded the Ekushey Padak posthumously for his contribution to the Bengali Language Movement.

== Early life ==
Shamsul Haque was born on 29 January 1930 at Tarakanda Upazila in Mymensingh. He studied in Ananda Mohan College. He was jailed for his involvement in the Bengali Language Movement.

== Political life ==
Shamsul Haque was five time Member of Parliament for Mymensingh-15 and Mymensingh-2. He served as the Fulpur Upazila Parishad chairman in 1988. His son Sharif Ahmed was also the member of parliament for Mymensingh-2.
