= Nurul Islam =

Nurul Islam (Bengali: নূরুল ইসলাম, lit. 'Light of Islam') is a Bengali masculine given name of Arabic origin and may refer to:

== People ==
- A. K. M. Nurul Islam (1919–2015), Bangladeshi politician, justice and vice-president of Bangladesh
- Mohammad Nurul Islam (1924–2007), Bangladeshi economist, Governor of Bangladesh Bank
- Nurul Islam Chowdhury (1925–1995), Bangladeshi politician
- Mustafa Nur-Ul Islam (1927–2018), Bangladeshi academic and National Professor of Bangladesh
- Nurul Islam (broadcaster) (1928–2006), Bangladeshi broadcast journalist, producer, and presenter at BBC
- AKM Nurul Islam (botanist) (1928–2006), Bangladeshi botanist and National Professor of Bangladesh
- Nurul Islam (physician) (1928–2013), Bangladeshi physician and National Professor of Bangladesh
- Nurul Islam (economist) (1929–2023), Bangladeshi economist, politician, and philanthropist
- Nurul Islam (Dhubri politician) (1931–1997), Dhubri politician
- Md. Nurul Islam (Bangladeshi politician) (1931–2018), Bangladeshi Islamic scholar and politician
- M. Nurul Islam (1934–2020), Bangladeshi politician
- Nurul Islam Manzur (1936–2020), Bangladeshi politician and former State Minister of Communication
- A.B.M. Nurul Islam (1937–2020), Bangladeshi politician
- Nurul Islam (minister) (born 1938), Bangladeshi Minister of Expatriates' Welfare and Overseas Employment (2015–2018)
- A M Nurul Islam (1939–2017), Bangladeshi politician and bureaucrat
- Muhammad Nurul Islam (born 1943), Bangladeshi diplomat
- Nurul Islam (academic) (1939–2017), Founding chairman of English department at Jahangirnagar University and vice-chancellor of Eastern University
- Nurul Islam Nahid (born 1945), Bangladeshi politician and the Minister of Education (2015–2018)
- Nurul Islam Babul (1946–2020), Bangladeshi businessman
- Nurul Islam Khan (1946–2023), Bangladeshi politician
- Nurul Islam Jihadi (1948–2021), Bangladeshi Islamic scholar
- Nurul Islam Milon (born 1949), Bangladeshi politician
- Nurul Islam Talukder (Bogra politician) (born 1950), Bangladeshi politician from Bogra
- Nurul Islam Moni (born 1952), Bangladeshi politician
- Nurul Islam Olipuri (born 1955), Bangladeshi Islamic scholar
- Nurul Islam Omar (born 1955), Bangladeshi politician
- Muhammad Nurul Islam Sujon (born 1956), Bangladeshi politician and the Minister of Railways
- Nurulislam Arkallayev (born 1961), Ukrainian politician
- Haji Sheikh Nurul Islam (1963–2024), Indian-Bengali politician
- Nurul Islam Bablu (born 1988), Bangladeshi actor
- Khandaker Nurul Islam (died 2001), Bangladeshi politician
- Nurul Islam Farooqi (died 2014), Bangladeshi Islamic scholar
- Muhammad Nurul Islam, Bangladeshi auditor
- Nurul Islam (born 1948), Rohingya lawyer and political activist
- Nurul Islam Shishu, retired General of Bangladesh Army
- Nurul Islam Talukder, Bangladeshi politician from Sirajganj
- Nurul Islam Khan, Bangladeshi politician from Netrokona
- Nurul Islam Sikder, Bangladeshi politician
- Syed Nurul Islam (born 1971), Bangladeshi police officer
- Md. Nurul Islam (Assam politician), Indian politician
- Nurul Islam (Assam politician), Indian politician
- Md. Nurul Islam (academic) (born 1971), Vice-Chancellor of Dhaka Central University
- Nurul Islam (Bangladeshi politician), former member of parliament for Mymensingh-3
- Mohammad Nurul Islam (politician), member of parliament from Bhola-4

== Other ==
- Noor-e-Islam Mosque, Réunion
- Noorul Islam Centre for Higher Education, Tamil Nadu
- Noorul Islam University, Tamil Nadu
- Nurul Islam Great Mosque, Indonesia
- Nurul Islam Mosque, Cape Town, South Africa
- Saheed Nurul Islam Mahavidyalaya, West Bengal

== See also ==
- Nur (name)
