= M. Iqbal Hossain =

Bangladeshi politician

- এম ইকবাল হোসেইন
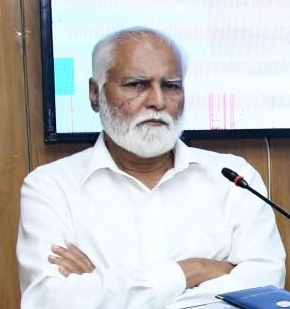
- Iqbal Hossain in 2026

Minister of State for Disaster Management and Relief
- Incumbent
- Assumed office 17 February 2026
- Prime Minister: Tarique Rahman
- Preceded by: Muhibur Rahman Muhib

Member of Parliament
- Incumbent
- Assumed office 17 February 2026
- Preceded by: Nilufar Anjum Poppy
- Constituency: Mymensingh-3

Personal details
- Born: 17 October 1950 (age 76) Mymensingh, East Bengal, Dominion of Pakistan
- Party: Bangladesh Nationalist Party
- Parent: Ismail Hossain Talukder (father)
- Education: Bangladesh University of Engineering and Technology

M. Iqbal Hossain (born 17 October 1950) is a Bangladeshi politician. He is the incumbent State Minister of Disaster Management and Relief. He was elected as a Member of Parliament from Mymensingh-3 constituency in the 13th National Parliament election held in 2026 as a candidate of the Bangladesh Nationalist Party (BNP).

== Early life and education ==
M. Iqbal Hossain was born to Ismail Hossain Talukder and Syeda Fatema Khatun, residents of Tatrakanda village in Sidhla union of Gauripur Upazila. His father, Ismail Hossain Talukder, was elected as a Member of Parliament from Mymensingh-2 (Phulpur-Tarakanda) constituency in the second national parliamentary election in 1979. He graduated from Bangladesh University of Engineering and Technology.

== Political career ==
Iqbal Hossain became the Minister of State for Disaster Management and Relief in 2026.
