= Phulpur =

Phulpur may refer to:

== Bangladesh ==
- Phulpur Upazila, upazila in Mymensingh district, Bangladesh
- Phulpur, Mymensingh, town in Mymensingh Division, Bangladesh

== India ==
- Phulpur, Agra, village in Agra district of Uttar Pradesh, India
- Phulpur, Prayagraj, town in Prayagraj district of Uttar Pradesh, India
- Phulpur, Azamgarh, town in Azamgarh district of Uttar Pradesh, India
