= Mymensingh-3 =

Constituency of Bangladesh's Jatiya Sangsad

Coordinates: 24.95°N 90.36°E

- Constituency for the Jatiya Sangsad
- District: Mymensingh District
- Division: Mymensingh Division
- Electorate: 234,595 (2018)

Current constituency
- Created: 1973
- Party: Bangladesh Nationalist Party
- Member: M. Iqbal Hossain
- ← 147 Mymensingh-2 149 Mymensingh-4 →

Mymensingh-3 is a constituency represented in the Jatiya Sangsad (National Parliament) of Bangladesh since 2026 by M. Iqbal Hossain of the Bangladesh Nationalist Party.

== Boundaries ==
The constituency encompasses Gouripur Upazila.

== History ==
The constituency was created for the first general elections in newly independent Bangladesh, held in 1973.

Ahead of the 2008 general election, the Election Commission redrew constituency boundaries to reflect population changes revealed by the 2001 Bangladesh census. The 2008 redistricting altered the boundaries of the constituency.

Ahead of the 2014 general election, the Election Commission reduced the boundaries of the constituency. Previously it had also included one union parishad (Bishka) of Phulpur Upazila, and five union parishads of Mymensingh Sadar Upazila: Borar Char, Char Ishwardia, Char Nilakshmia, Paranganj, and Sirta.

== Members of Parliament ==
Election	Member	Party
1973	Nurul Islam	Awami League
1979	AFM Nazmul Huda	Bangladesh Nationalist Party
1986	Nurul Amin Khan Pathan	Jatiya Party
1991	Nazrul Islam	Awami League
1992 by-election	R. Begum	Awami League
1996	AFM Nazmul Huda	Bangladesh Nationalist Party
2001	Mozibur Rahman Fakir	Awami League
2016 by-election	Nazim Uddin Ahmed	Awami League
2024	Nilufar Anjum Poppy	Awami League
2026	M. Iqbal Hossain	Bangladesh Nationalist Party

== Elections ==
=== Elections in the 2010s ===
Mujibur Rahman Fakir died in May 2016. Nazim Uddin Ahmed of the Awami League was elected in a July by-election.

General Election 2014: Mymensingh-3
Party	Candidate	Votes	%	±%
AL	Mozibur Rahman Fakir	43,673	74.3	+6.3
Independent	Naznin Alam	15,123	25.7	N/A
Majority		28,550	48.6	+10.0
Turnout		58,796	28.7	−9.9
AL hold				

=== Elections in the 2000s ===
General Election 2008: Mymensingh-3
Party	Candidate	Votes	%	±%
AL	Mozibur Rahman Fakir	177,280	68.0	+28.6
BNP	M. Iqbal Hossain	76,517	29.3	−5.4
Zaker Party	Gulam Mohammed	3,192	1.2	N/A
NAP	Md. Abdul Motin	3,167	1.2	N/A
KSJL	Md. Motiur Rahaman	477	0.2	N/A
Gano Forum	Md. Rajab Ali	255	0.1	N/A
Majority		100,763	38.6	+33.9
Turnout		260,888	84.5	+10.9
AL hold				

General Election 2001: Mymensingh-3
Party	Candidate	Votes	%	±%
AL	Mozibur Rahman Fakir	50,632	39.4	+9.7
BNP	AFM Nazmul Huda	44,603	34.7	−0.6
IJOF	Abdul Mannan	33,263	25.9	N/A
Majority		6,029	4.7	−0.8
Turnout		128,498	73.6	+3.3
AL gain from BNP				

=== Elections in the 1990s ===
General Election June 1996: Mymensingh-3
Party	Candidate	Votes	%	±%
BNP	AFM Nazmul Huda	34,493	35.3	
AL	Mozibur Rahman Fakir	29,073	29.7	
JP(E)	Nurul Amin Khan Pathan	27,546	28.2	
Jamaat	Syed Golam Sarwar	5,835	6.0	
Zaker Party	Aminul Huda Mohammad Abed	780	0.8	
Majority		5,420	5.5	
Turnout		97,727	70.3	
BNP gain from AL				

Nazrul Islam died in office. R. Begum of the Awami League was elected in an October 1992 by-election.

General Election 1991: Mymensingh-3
Party	Candidate	Votes	%	±%
AL	Nazrul Islam	28,092	32.7	
JP(E)	Nurul Amin Khan Pathan	24,239	28.2	
BNP	Md. Nazmul Huda	18,127	21.1	
JSD	Md. Faizur Rahman Fakir	5,425	6.3	
Jamaat	Syed Golam Sarwar	3,062	3.6	
BAKSAL	A. Mannan	2,992	3.5	
Bangladesh Janata Party	Rahim Uddin	1,956	2.3	
Zaker Party	Aamir Uddin	1,508	1.8	
Jatiya Samajtantrik Dal-JSD	Hasib	413	0.5	
Majority		3,853	4.5	
Turnout		85,814	49.9	
AL gain from JP(E)				
