= Nazrul Islam (Mymensingh-3 politician) =

Bangladeshi politician

Member of Bangladesh Parliament
- In office 1991–1992
- Preceded by: Nurul Amin Khan Pathan
- Succeeded by: R. Begum

Personal details
- Died: 1992
- Party: Bangladesh Awami League

Nazrul Islam is a Bangladesh Awami League politician and a former member of parliament for Mymensingh-3.

== Career ==
Islam was elected to parliament from Mymensingh-3 as a Bangladesh Awami League candidate in 1991.

== Death ==
Islam died in 1992.
