= Tarakanda Upazila =

Tarakanda তারাকান্দা
- Upazila
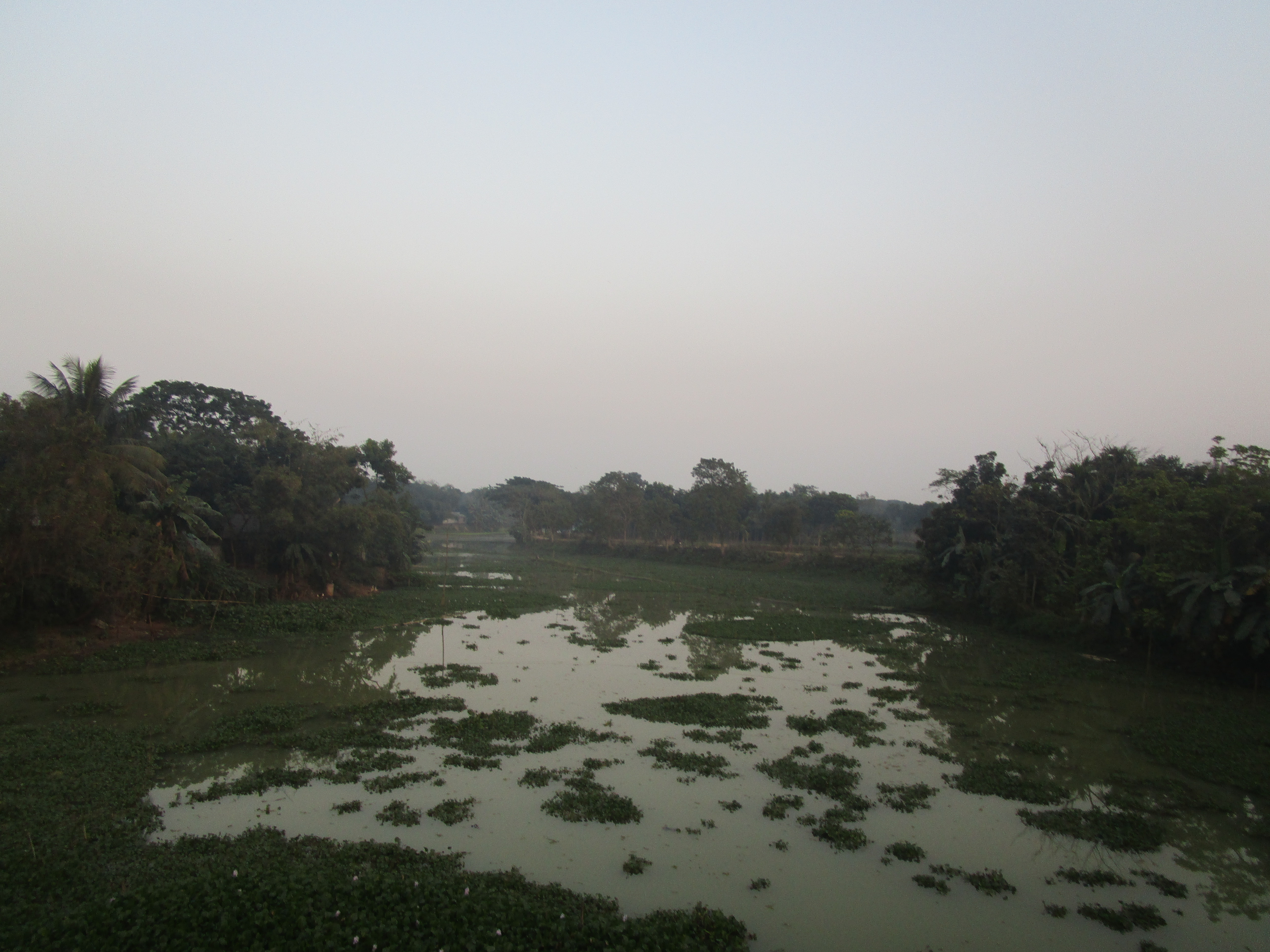
- Bandsa River near Tarakanda Bazar

- Coordinates: 24.862°N 90.44°E
- Country: Bangladesh
- Division: Mymensingh
- District: Mymensingh

Government
  - MP (Mymensingh-2): Sharif Ahmed (Awami League)
  - Upazila Chairman: Muhammad Fazlul Haque Majhiyali

Area
  - Total: 313.68 km^{2} (121.11 sq mi)

Population (2022)
  - Total: 337,308
  - Density: 1,075.3/km^{2} (2,785.1/sq mi)
- Time zone: UTC+6 (BST)
- Postal code: 2252
- Website: tarakanda.mymensingh.gov.bd

Tarakanda Upazila mauza geocode map

Tarakanda (Bengali: তারাকান্দা) is an upazila of Mymensingh District in Bangladesh. It lies on the banks of the Mara Kharia River.

== History ==
It is estimated that human habitation in this area began between the sixth and twelfth centuries.

Tarakanda was established as a thana on 19 May 1999. In 2012, Tarakanda Thana was upgraded into an upazila (sub-district), making it the latest upazila of Mymensingh District. Prior to this, Tarakanda was a part of Phulpur Upazila.

== Demographics ==
Historical population
Year	Pop.	±%
2011	298,220	—
2022	337,308	+13.1%
Source: Bangladesh Bureau of Statistics

Religions in Tarakanda Upazila (2022)
Religion	Percent
Islam	96.08%
Hinduism	3.74%
Other or not stated	0.18%

According to the 2022 Bangladeshi census, Tarakanda Upazila had 79,506 households and a population of 337,308. 11.32% of the population were under 5 years of age. Tarakanda had a literacy rate (age 7 and over) of 67.15%: 68.36% for males and 65.98% for females, and a sex ratio of 97.18 males for 100 females. 17,503 (5.19%) lived in urban areas.

== Economy and tourism ==
The Tarakanda Jami Mosque is a popular mosque. The Tarakanda Bazar is also noted. The weekly newspaper Tarakanda Barta is published here. The economy is mostly agriculturaland the upazila produces a large quantity of fish and vegetables.

== Administration ==
Tarakanda Upazila is divided into ten union parishads: Balikha, Banihala, Biska, Dhakua, Galagaon, Kakni, Kamargaon, Kamaria, Rampur, and Tarakanda.

=== Upazila chairmen ===
List of chairmen
Name	Term
Sharif Ahmed	5/11/2013 - 1/12/2013
Shaykh Alauddin	6/1/2014 - 19/6/2014
Motahar Husayn	19/6/2014 - 5/11/2018
Muhammad Fazlul Haque	8/11/2018–present

== Education ==
In 1929, the Tarakanda Multilateral High School was established. Other notable institutions include Shahid Smrity High School, Galagaon High School, Kakni High School and Kakni Model Academy.

== See also ==
- Upazilas of Bangladesh
- Districts of Bangladesh
- Divisions of Bangladesh
- Administrative geography of Bangladesh
