= Gouripur Rajendra Kishore Government High School =

Government secondary school in Bangladesh

- গৌরীপুর রাজেন্দ্র কিশোর সরকারি উচ্চ বিদ্যালয়

Location
- Gouripur, Mymensingh; Bangladesh; 24.7555°N 90.5671°E

Information
- Type: Government Secondary School
- Established: 1911
- Head teacher: Md. Badrul Alam (Acting)
- Enrollment: 625 (approx.)
- Website: rkghs.school.gov.bd

Gouripur Rajendra Kishore Government High School (Bengali: গৌরীপুর রাজেন্দ্র কিশোর সরকারি উচ্চ বিদ্যালয়) is one of the oldest and traditional educational institutions in Gouripur Upazila of Mymensingh District, Bangladesh. It was established in 1911 by Zamindar Brajendra Kishore Roy Chowdhury in the name of his father, Rajendra Kishore. It is most commonly known as "Gouripur R.K. Govt. High School."

== Campus and Architecture ==
The school's main building is constructed in the shape of the English letter ‘E’. Located on nearly 11 acres of land, the school premises feature a massive pond named ‘Ananta Sagar’. The founder, Brajendra Kishore, named this pond after his wife, Anantabala Devi.

== Institutional System ==
The school has been conducting its educational programs since 1911. Currently, it provides education from Class VI to Class X. It is a boys' school with two sections in each class. At present, a total of 625 students are studying in this school. Currently, Badrul Alam is serving as the Headmaster of the school.

== Notable alumni ==
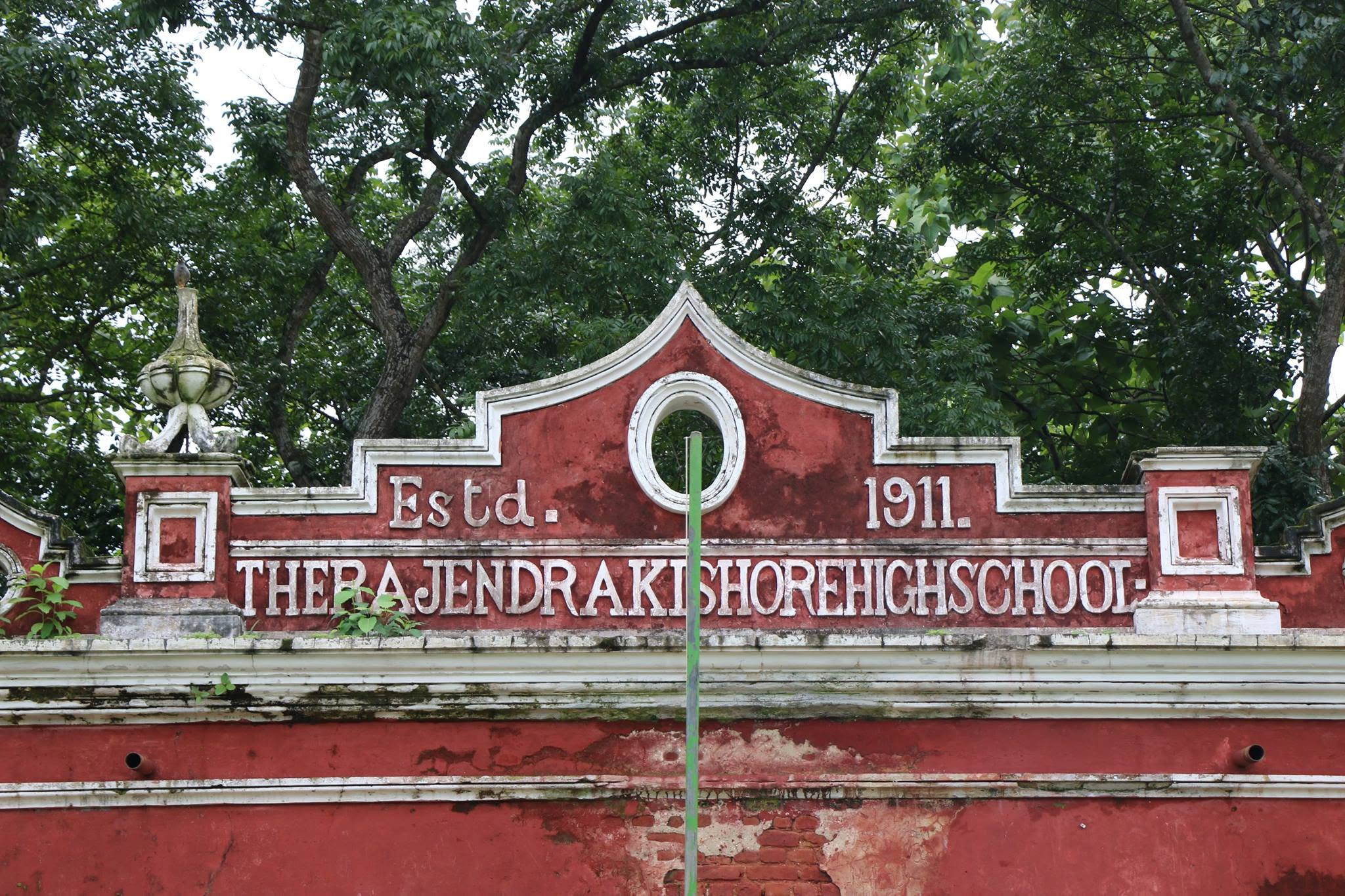
First ESTD Nameplate of RK School

Frontal view of the School in 2026

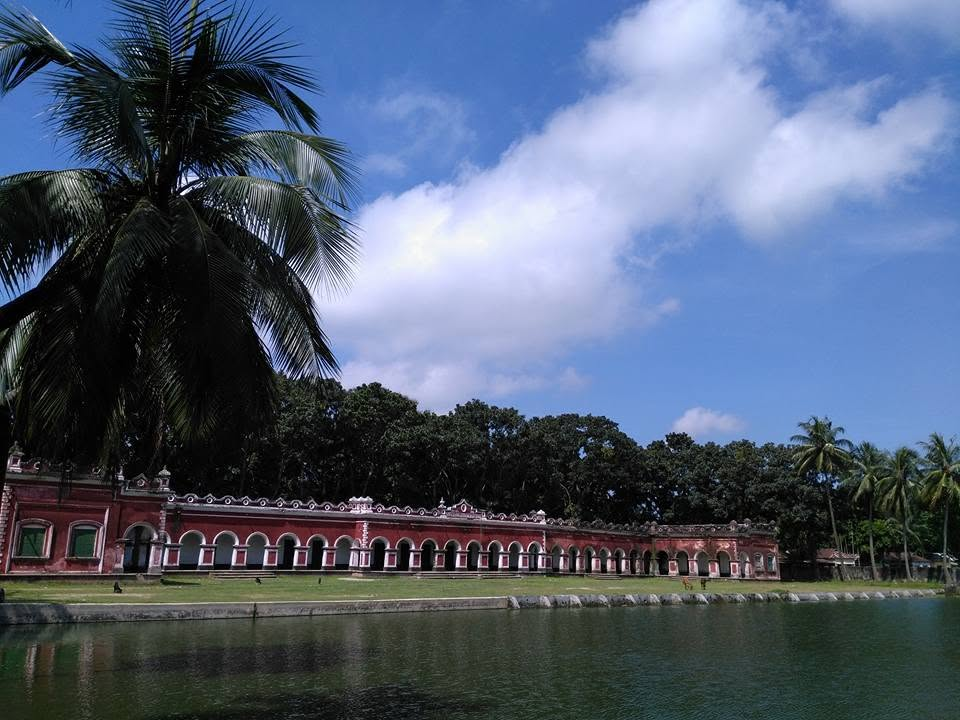
Frontal Side of RK School

- AKMA Muqtadir – Renowned Bangladeshi ophthalmologist.
