= Rajab Ali Fakir =

Bangladeshi politician

Member of Bangladesh Parliament
- In office 1988–1991
- Preceded by: Md. Shamsul Haque
- Succeeded by: Md. Shamsul Haque

Personal details
- Party: Bangladesh Nationalist Party
- Children: Shah Shahid Sarwar

Rajab Ali Fakir is a Bangladesh Nationalist Party politician and a former member of parliament for Mymensingh-2.

== Career ==
Fakir was elected to parliament from Mymensingh-2 as a Bangladesh Nationalist Party candidate in 1988.
