= Nazim Uddin Ahmed =

Nazim Uddin Ahmed may refer to:

- Nazim Uddin Ahmed (Mymensingh politician)
- Nazim Uddin Ahmed (Lakshmipur politician)
