= Maoha Union =

Maoha Union মাওহা ইউনিয়ন
- Union
- Location within Bangladesh
- Coordinates: 24.44°N 90.35°E
- Country: Bangladesh
- Division: Mymensingh
- District: Mymensingh
- Upazila: Gouripur
- Time zone: UTC+6 (BST)
- Postal code: 2280
- Website: maohaup.mymensingh.gov.bd

Maoha Union (Bengali: মাওহা ইউনিয়ন) is a union parishad under Gouripur Upazila of Mymensingh District in the division of Mymensingh, Bangladesh.
