= Gouripur, Bangladesh =

Gouripur গৌরীপুর
- Town
- Location within Bangladesh
- Coordinates: 24.757°N 90.570°E
- Country: Bangladesh
- Division: Mymensingh
- District: Mymensingh
- Upazila: Gouripur
- Elevation: 3 m (9.8 ft)
- Time zone: UTC+6 (BST)
- Postal code: 2270
- Website: gouripur.mymensingh.gov.bd

Gouripur is a town in northern Bangladesh. The headquarters of Gouripur Upazila, Mymensingh District, Mymensingh Division, it is 150 kilometres (93 mi) from Dhaka, 20 kilometres (12 mi) from Mymensingh, and 90 kilometres (56 mi) from the border with the Indian state of Meghalaya. In Gouripur there is an important railway station on the Narayanganj-Bahadurabad Ghat Line. The town is surrounded by several small valleys between high forests. The temperature ranges from 12 to 33 °C (54 to 91 °F), and the annual rainfall averages 2,174 millimetres (85.6 in).

== Gouripur House ==
Gouripur House is an almost hundred-year-old haveli built by the then local zamindar Brajendra Kishore Roy Chowdhury. He and his son, Birendra Kishore Roy Chowdhury, were well known for their patronization of Indian classical music. Following the partition, the property has been managed by Sonali Bank.

== Places of interest ==
- Shrine of Nizam Aulia
- Fort of Bokai
- Nagar
- Shrine of Heroine Sakhina
- Tajpur Fort
- Ramgopalpur Zeminder House & The Lion Door
- Gouripur Rajendra Kishore Government High School
- Gouripur Govt. College

== See also ==
- List of cities and towns in Bangladesh
