= Shahrasti Upazila =

Shahrasti শাহরাস্তি
- Upazila
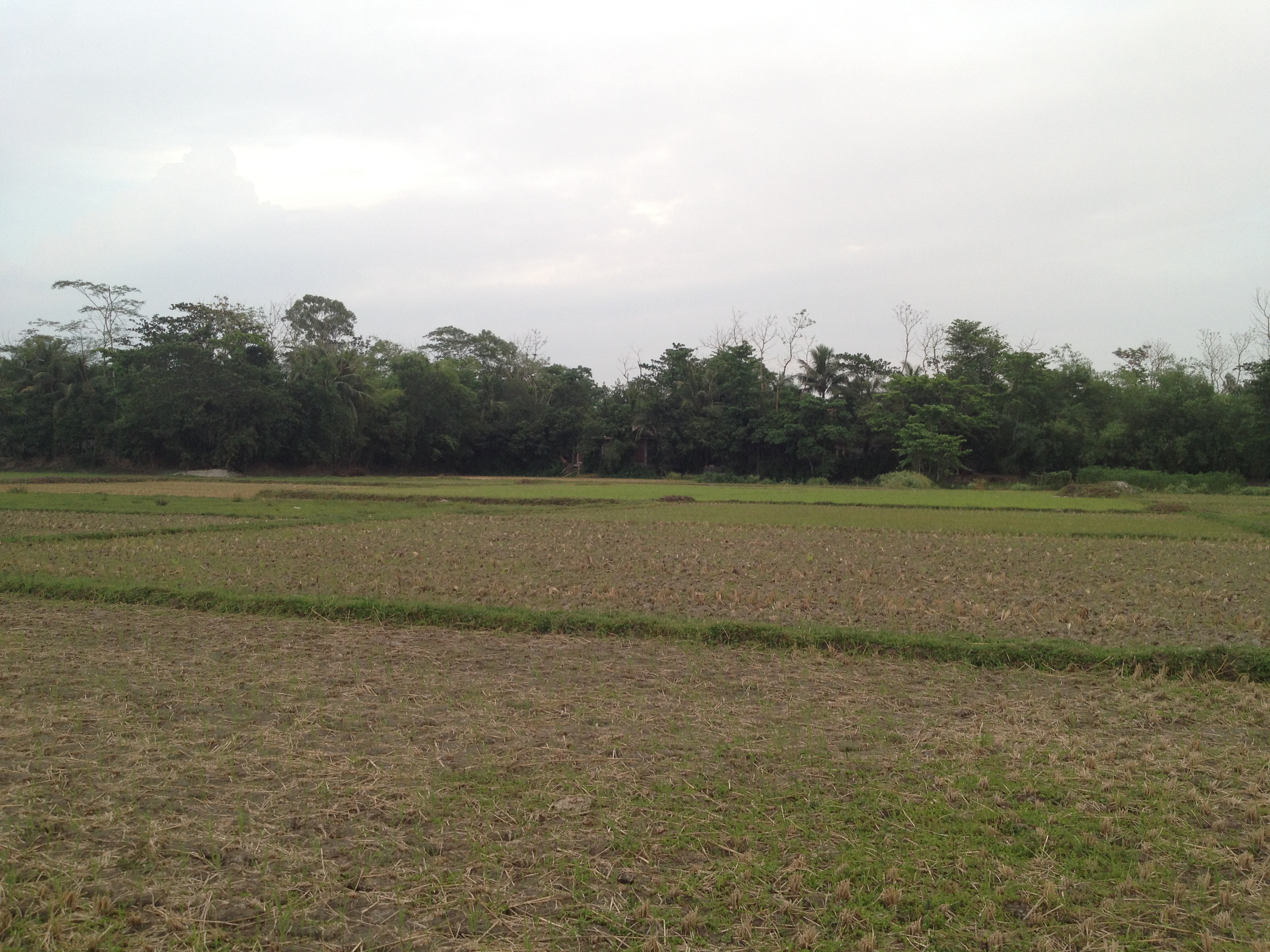
- Fields near Hapez Shaheber Bari

- Coordinates: 23°13.3′N 90°57′E
- Country: Bangladesh
- Division: Chittagong
- District: Chandpur
- Headquarters: Shahrasti

Area
  - Total: 154.83 km^{2} (59.78 sq mi)

Population (2022)
  - Total: 254,662
  - Density: 1,644.8/km^{2} (4,260.0/sq mi)
- Time zone: UTC+6 (BST)
- Postal code: 3620
- Area code: 08427
- Website: Official Map of Shahrasti

Shahrasti Upazila mauza geocode map

Shahrasti (Bengali: শাহরাস্তি) is an upazila of Chandpur District in the Division of Chittagong, Bangladesh.

== Religious Place ==
Shahrasti Mazar (shrine) is a heritage site especially for the Muslim community here. Annual Urs is held at this shrine every year. Devotees from far and wide come to these events. There are 2 huge twin ponds, which add to the beauty of the shrine.

== Demographics ==
Religions in Shahrasti Upazila (2022)
Religion	Percent
Islam	96.16%
Hinduism	3.83%
Other or not stated	0.01%

According to the 2022 Bangladeshi census, Shahrasti Upazila had 58,752 households and a population of 254,662. 10.95% of the population were under 5 years of age. Shahrasti had a literacy rate (age 7 and over) of 82.33%: 82.24% for males and 82.41% for females, and a sex ratio of 84.21 males for every 100 females. 52,458 (20.60%) lived in urban areas.

According to the 2011 Census of Bangladesh, Shahrasti Upazila had 46,139 households and a population of 229,118. 55,598 (24.27%) were under 10 years of age. Shahrasti had a literacy rate (age 7 and over) of 62.68%, compared to the national average of 51.8%, and a sex ratio of 1147 females per 1000 males. 28,287 (12.35%) lived in urban areas.

According to the 1991 Bangladesh census, Shahrasti had a population of 180,643. Males constituted 48.59% of the population, and females 51.41%. The population aged 18 or over was 84,718. Shahrasti had an average literacy rate of 43% (7+ years), against the national average of 32.4%.

== Economy ==
The main occupation is agriculture. Most people of Shahrasti upazila work abroad, they are actually remittance fighters.

== Administration ==
Shahrasti Upazila is divided into Shahrasti Municipality and ten union parishads: Dakshin Meher, Dakshin Raysree, Dakshin Suchipara, Dakshin Tamta, East Chitoshi, Uttar Meher, Uttar Raysree, Uttar Suchipara, Uttar Tamta, and West Chitoshi. The union parishads are subdivided into 152 mauzas and 163 villages.

Shahrasti Municipality is subdivided into 9 wards and 17 mahallas.

Nazia Hosen is a Bangladeshi government official currently serving as an Upazila Nirbahi Officer (UNO). She is part of the 35th Bangladesh Civil Service (BCS) batch, is the current Upazila Nirbahi Officer (UNO) of this upazila. She is also an upazila land commissioner & executive magistrate of Shahrasti upazila. Besides Hillol Chakma, a 38th BCS Administration Cadre officer, has joined as the Assistant Commissioner (Land) and Executive Magistrate of Shahrasthi Upazila. The upazila consists of one municipality (pourashava) and ten union parishads. These union parishads are further subdivided into 119 mauzas and 135 villages. The Shahrasti Municipality is divided into 9 wards and 19 mahallas, providing urban governance and civic services for the town area.

Unions The ten union parishads of Shahrasti Upazila are: Amratali Union Chamta Union Dakshin Suchipara Union Dakshin Kachua Union Meher (North) Union Meher (South) Union North Suchipara Union Pakulla Union Satbaria Union Uttar Kachua Union

== Infrastructure ==
Shahrasti upazila has only one hospital known as "Shahrasti Upazila Health Complex". The hospital has 50 beds and is operated by government. It has several Family Welfare Centers and Community Clinics at Union level.

Another Private Hospitals are

- Shahrasti Memorial Hospital (Meher-Kalibari, Shahrasti)
- Shahrasti General Hospital (Thakurbazar, Shahrasti)
- Shahrasti Popular Hospital (Mazarroad, Shahrasti)
- Shahrasti Medilab Hospital, Owaruk Bazar, Shahrasti
- Shah-Sharif General Hospital (Bernaiya, Bazar Shahrasti)
- Bernaiya General Hospital (Bernaiya, Bazar Shahrasti)

== Notable residents ==
- Dr. Nurul Islam, Vice-Chancellor of Eastern University and founding chairman of the English department at Jahangirnagar University, grew up in Waruk village, where he is buried.

== Education ==
According to the 2011 census, the literacy rate of Shahrasti Upazila is 62.7%.

Education Information of Shahrasti Thana
Serial no	Institution	Total number
1	Government Primary School	101
2	Junior High School	3
3	High School (Co-Education)	32
4	High School (Girls)	2
5	Dakhil Madrasa	10
6	Alim Madrasa	4
7	Fazil Madrasa	5
8	Kamil Madrasa	1
9	College	4
10	College (Girls)	1

Educational institution

- Shahrasti Govt. Bohumukhi High School
- Bernaiya Ideal School & College
- Chandpur Homoeopathic Medical College
- Meher Degree College
- Indexpara Degree College
- Karfunnecha Government Women's Degree College
- Bholdighi Kamil Madrasa
- Kankairtala Golam Kibria Dakhil Madrasa
- Nijmehar Model Pilot High School
- Waruk Rahmaniya High School
- Mehar High School
- Panchagram Azizur Rahman High School
- Naora Public School
- Suapara G.K. high school
- Ragai High School
- Khilabazar School and College
- Tamta Adarsh High School
- Balsheed Haji Akub Ali High School
- Dakshin Ughepara Union High School
- Unkila High School
- Bernaya High School
- Khedihar Adarsh High School
- Ugharia U. C. high school
- Devkara Shahidullah Memorial High School
- Chitoshi R&M High School
- BANIACHON JB HIGH SCHOOL
- Vijaypur High School
- Fatikkhira SA Girls High School
- Monira Azim Academy
- Chediara High School
- Dhamra Adarsh High School
- Ichapura High School
- Al Hera Academy
- Hossainpur Lower Secondary Girls School
- Janata High School
- Panchnagar Standard High School
- Noagaon High School
- Farid Uddin High School
- Shahrasti Chishtiya Alim Madrasa
- Shahrasti Model School
- Badia M Haque High School
- Shahrasti Beam Laboratory School
- Hossainpur Noorani Cadet Madrasa
- Suraiya Ahmad Noorani Hafezia Madrasa
- Haji Shaheed Ullah Memorial School & Noorani Madrasa, Qazir Cup, Shahrasti Municipality.
