= Mufti Muhammadullah =

Bangladeshi politician

Mufti Muhammadullah is a Bangladeshi Islamic scholar and a politician of the Bangladesh Khelafat Majlis. He was elected as a Member of Parliament in the 13th National Parliamentary Election.

== Politics ==
He contested from the Mymensingh-2 (Phulpur–Tarakanda) constituency as the “Rickshaw” symbol candidate of Bangladesh Khelafat Majlis, supported by the 11-party alliance. He won the election with 144,565 votes. His nearest rival, Motahar Hossain Talukdar, received 117,344 votes. The margin of victory was 27,221 votes. In Phulpur Upazila, he received 80,731 votes, and in Tarakanda Upazila, he received 63,834 votes.
