= Nurul Islam (Bangladeshi politician) =

Bangladeshi politician

Member of Bangladesh Parliament
- In office 1973–1979
- Succeeded by: AFM Nazmul Huda

Personal details
- Party: Bangladesh Awami League

Nurul Islam is a Bangladesh Awami League politician and a former member of parliament for Mymensingh-3.

== Career ==
Islam was elected to parliament from Mymensingh-3 as a Bangladesh Awami League candidate in 1973.
