= Nazim Uddin Ahmed (Mymensingh politician) =

Bangladeshi politician

- নাজিম উদ্দিন আহমেদ

Member of the Bangladesh Parliament for Mymensingh-3
- In office 2016–2024
- Preceded by: Mozibur Rahman Fakir

Personal details
- Born: 12 September 1950 (age 75)
- Party: Bangladesh Awami League
- Profession: Advocate

Nazim Uddin Ahmed (Bengali: নাজিম উদ্দিন আহমেদ)is a freedom fighter of the Bangladesh Liberation War, Bangladesh Awami League politician and former member of parliament for Mymensingh-3.

== Career ==
Ahmed was elected to Parliament from Mymensingh-3 as a Bangladesh Awami League candidate in 2016 in a by-election following the death of the former member of parliament, Mozibur Rahman Fakir. Gouripur Upazila Chairman and Bangladesh Nationalist Party politician Tayebur Rahman Hiron was arrested by Detective Branch, according to his family, after an argument with Ahmed on 16 February 2017.
