= Srijangram Assembly constituency =

Assembly constituency of Assam

Srijangram
- Constituency No. 17 for the Assam Legislative Assembly

Constituency details
- Country: India
- Region: Northeast India
- State: Assam
- District: Bongaigaon
- Lok Sabha constituency: Dhubri
- Established: 2023
- Reservation: None

Member of Legislative Assembly
- 16th Assam Legislative Assembly
- Incumbent Md. Nurul Islam
- Party: Indian National Congress
- Alliance: Asom Sonmilito Morcha
- Elected year: 2026

Srijangram Assembly constituency is one of the 126 assembly constituencies of Assam, a northeastern state of India. It was newly formed in 2023. It is part of the Dhubri Lok Sabha constituency.

== Election Results ==
=== 2026 ===
2026 Assam Legislative Assembly election: Srijangram
Party	Candidate	Votes	%	±%
INC	Md. Nurul Islam	106,716	47.47	
AIUDF	Rejaul Karim Sarkar	88,411	39.33	
AGP	Shahidul Islam	26,671	11.86	
NOTA	NOTA	1,003	0.45	
Margin of victory		18,305	8.14	
Turnout		224,808	95.82	
Rejected ballots				
Registered electors				
INC gain from AIUDF		Swing		

== See also ==
- List of constituencies of Assam Legislative Assembly
