= R. Begum =

Bangladeshi Politician

Member of Bangladesh Parliament
- In office 1992–1996
- Preceded by: Nazrul Islam
- Succeeded by: Mozibur Rahman Fakir

Personal details
- Party: Bangladesh Awami League

R. Begum is a Bangladesh Awami League politician and a former member of parliament for Mymensingh-3.

== Career ==
Begum was elected to parliament from Mymensingh-3 as a Bangladesh Awami League candidate in 1992 in a by-election following the death of incumbent member of parliament, Nazrul Islam.
