= Mymensingh-2 =

Constituency of Bangladesh's Jatiya Sangsad

Coordinates: 24.95°N 90.36°E

- Constituency for the Jatiya Sangsad
- District: Mymensingh District
- Division: Mymensingh Division
- Electorate: 450,703 (2018)

Current constituency
- Created: 1973
- Party: Bangladesh Khelafat Majlis
- Member: Mufti Muhammadullah
- ← 146 Mymensingh-1 148 Mymensingh-3 →

Mymensingh-2 is a constituency represented in the Jatiya Sangsad (National Parliament) of Bangladesh since 2026 by Mufti Muhammadullah of the Bangladesh Khelafat Majlis.

== Boundaries ==
The constituency encompasses Phulpur Upazila and Tarakanda Upazila.

== History ==
The constituency was created for the first general elections in newly independent Bangladesh, held in 1973.

Ahead of the 2008 general election, the Election Commission redrew constituency boundaries to reflect population changes revealed by the 2001 Bangladesh census. The 2008 redistricting altered the boundaries of the constituency.

Ahead of the 2014 general election, the Election Commission expanded the boundaries of the constituency to include all of the former Phulpur Upazila (which in 2012 had been split into a smaller Phulpur Upazila and the new Tarakanda Upazila). Previously the constituency had excluded one union parishad: Bishka.

== Members of Parliament ==
Election	Member	Party
1973	Rashed Mosharraf	Awami League
1979	Ismail Hossain Talukder	Muslim League
1986	Md. Shamsul Haque	Awami League
1988	Rajab Ali Fakir	Jatiya Party
1991	Md. Shamsul Haque	Awami League
Feb 1996	Abul Basar Akand	Bangladesh Nationalist Party
Jun 1996	Md. Shamsul Haque	Awami League
2001	Shah Shahid Sarwar	Bangladesh Nationalist Party
2008	Hayatur Rahman Khan	Awami League
2014	Sharif Ahmed	Awami League
2026	Mufti Muhammadullah	Bangladesh Khelafat Majlis

== Elections ==
=== Elections in the 2010s ===
Sharif Ahmed was elected unopposed in the 2014 general election after opposition parties withdrew their candidacies in a boycott of the election.

=== Elections in the 2000s ===
General Election 2008: Mymensingh-2
Party	Candidate	Votes	%	±%
AL	Hayatur Rahman Khan	172,533	63.8	+24.1
BNP	Shah Shahid Sarwar	94,090	34.8	−15.7
IAB	Golam Maula Bhuyan	2,485	0.9	N/A
KSJL	Md. Anwar Hossain	1,128	0.4	N/A
Majority		78,443	29.0	+18.2
Turnout		270,236	84.2	+12.8
AL gain from BNP				

General Election 2001: Mymensingh-2
Party	Candidate	Votes	%	±%
BNP	Shah Shahid Sarwar	114,048	50.5	+20.3
AL	Md. Shamsul Haque	89,631	39.7	+4.3
IJOF	Zia Uddin Ahammed	21,006	9.3	N/A
CPB	Abul Hashem	1,213	0.5	N/A
Majority		24,417	10.8	+5.6
Turnout		225,898	71.4	+13.4
BNP gain from AL				

=== Elections in the 1990s ===
General Election June 1996: Mymensingh-2
Party	Candidate	Votes	%	±%
AL	Md. Shamsul Haque	50,497	35.4	−2.8
BNP	Md. Ashraf Uddin Sarkar	43,037	30.2	+7.4
JP(E)	Shah Shahid Sarwar	42,678	30.0	+9.3
Jamaat	Md. Anisuzzaman	4,219	3.0	−0.3
IOJ	Md. Tafazzal Hossain Biswas	1,000	0.7	N/A
Zaker Party	Md. Saifal Islam	377	0.3	0.0
JSD	Md. Nazrul Islam	288	0.2	N/A
Gano Forum	A.K.M. Raihan Uddin	202	0.1	N/A
Bangladesh Muslim League (Jamir Ali)	Nurul Alam	153	0.1	N/A
Majority		7,460	5.2	−10.3
Turnout		142,451	58.0	+18.5
AL hold				

General Election 1991: Mymensingh-2
Party	Candidate	Votes	%	±%
AL	Md. Shamsul Haque	35,432	38.2	
BNP	Zulmat Ali Khan	21,091	22.8	
JP(E)	Shah Shahid Sarwar	19,139	20.7	
Independent	Golam Mostafa	6,239	6.7	
JSD	Abdul Mansur Sarker	4,373	4.7	
Jamaat	Md. Anisuzzaman	3,074	3.3	
Bangladesh Muslim League (Kader)	Ismail Hossain Talukder	2,489	2.7	
Jatiya Janata Party and Gonotantrik Oikkya Jot	Sheikh Alal Uddin	343	0.4	
Zaker Party	Md. A. Bari Sarker	266	0.3	
NAP (Muzaffar)	Abdul Zabbar	187	0.2	
Majority		14,341	15.5	
Turnout		92,633	39.5	
AL gain from BNP				
