= Abul Basar Akand =

Bangladeshi politician

Member of Bangladesh Parliament
- In office February 1996 – June 1996
- Preceded by: Md. Shamsul Haque
- Succeeded by: Md. Shamsul Haque

Personal details
- Party: Bangladesh Nationalist Party

Abul Basar Akand is a Bangladesh Nationalist Party politician and a former member of parliament from Mymensingh-2.

== Career ==
Akand was elected to parliament for Mymensingh-2 as a Bangladesh Nationalist Party candidate in February 1996.
