= Nilufar Anjum Poppy =

Bangladeshi politician

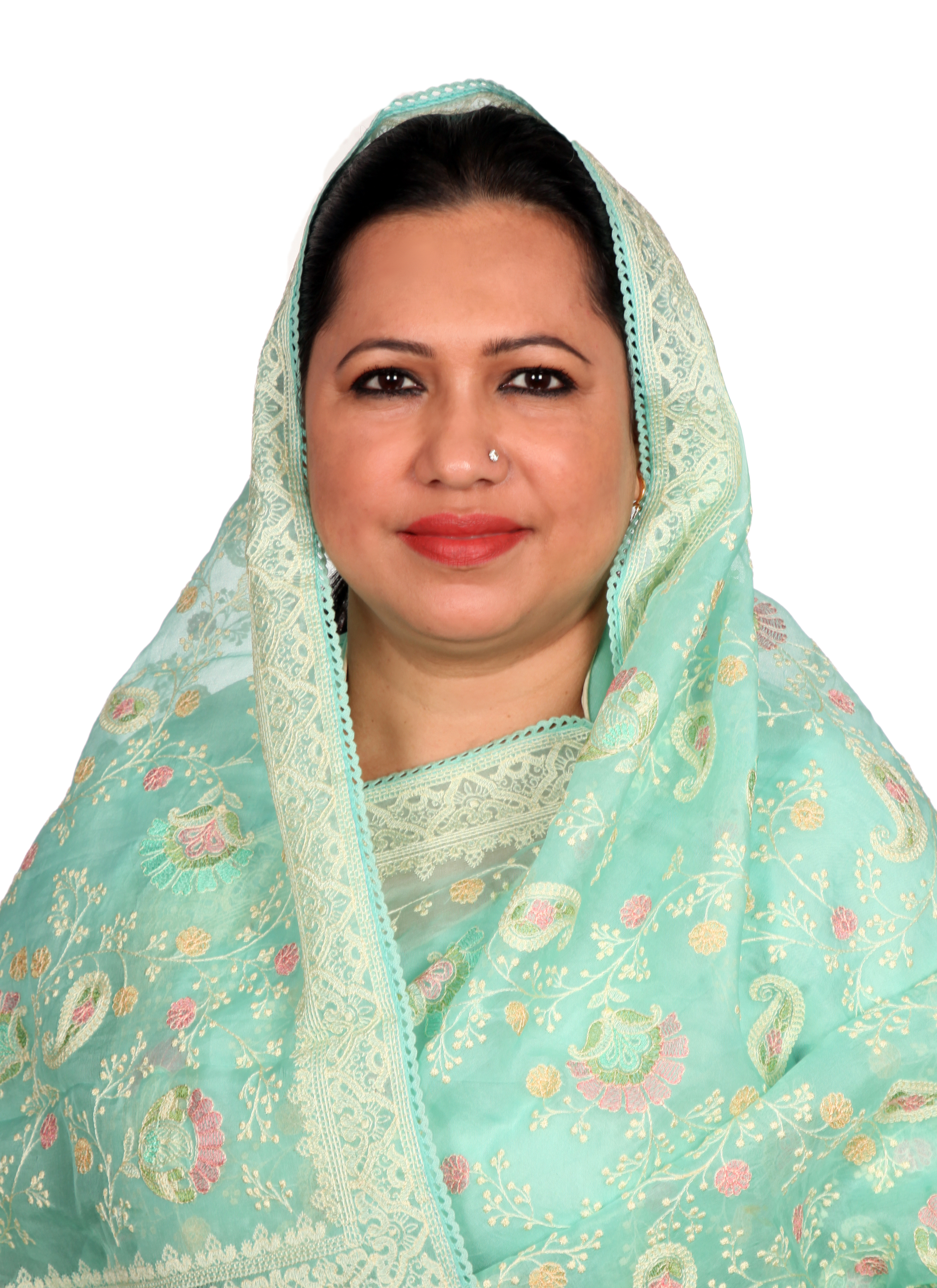
- Poppy in 2023

Member of the Bangladesh Parliament for Mymensingh-3
- In office 30 January 2024 – 6 August 2024
- Preceded by: Nazim Uddin Ahmed

Personal details
- Born: 27 June 1976 (age 49)
- Party: Bangladesh Awami League

Nilufar Anjum Poppy (born 27 June 1976) is a Bangladesh Awami League politician and a former Jatiya Sangsad member representing the Mymensingh-3 constituency served in 2024. She is serving as AL President of Gouripur upazila unit.
