= Ismail Hossain Talukder =

Bangladeshi politician

Member of Bangladesh Parliament
- In office 1979–1986
- Preceded by: Rashed Mosharraf
- Succeeded by: Md. Shamsul Haque

Personal details
- Died: 3 May 2014 Dhaka, Bangladesh
- Party: Bangladesh Nationalist Party
- Relations: M. Iqbal Hossain (son)

Ismail Hossain Talukder was a Bangladesh Muslim League politician and member of parliament for Mymensingh-2.

== Career ==
Talukder was elected to parliament from Mymensingh-2 as a Bangladesh Muslim League candidate in 1979. He died on 3 May 2014 in Dhaka.
