= Hayatur Rahman Khan =

Bangladeshi politician

Member of Bangladesh Parliament

Personal details
- Party: Bangladesh Awami League

Hayatur Rahman Khan is a Bangladesh Awami League politician and a former member of parliament for Mymensingh-2.

== Career ==
Khan was elected to parliament from Mymensingh-2 as a Bangladesh Awami League candidate in 2008. His nomination triggered protests by Awami League activists who wanted Sharif Ahmed to be nominated.
