= Mamun Al Mahtab =

Bangladeshi hepatologist

- মামুন আল মাহতাব
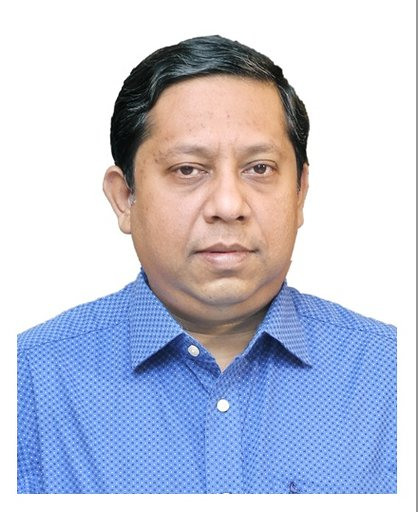
- Al Mahtab in 2021
- Born: 22 August 1970 (age 55); Bangladesh
- Occupation: Doctor

Mamun Al Mahtab (nickname: Shwapnil; born 22 August 1970) is a hepatologist and gastroenterologist in Bangladesh with extensive expertise in liver and digestive diseases.

== Education ==
Mahtab graduated from Mymensingh Medical College in 1995. He was awarded an MSc in gastroenterology from the University of London in 1998 and was subsequently awarded an MD in hepatology at Bangabandhu Sheikh Mujib Medical University in 2006. He is a Fellow of the Royal College of Physicians of London, the Royal College of Physicians of Ireland, the Indian College of Physicians, and the American College of Gastroenterology.

== Career ==
Mahtab was jointly awarded the 'Premio Nacional' from the Cuban Academy of Sciences for the discovery of NASVAC in 2019. He organizes awareness-raising programs on liver diseases across the country in addition to inventing the NASVAC drug, aiming to offer an effective solution to Hepatitis B at an affordable price for mass people in Bangladesh.

Mahtab is the chief researcher and investigator for the GBPD060 clinical study of the Bangladesh-developed SARS-CoV-2 mRNA candidate. He is also the lead researcher on NASVAC's Phase I/II and III clinical studies.

Mahtab is the principal investigator of the phase I/II and III clinical trials of NASVAC, a new generic for chronic hepatitis B, which is already registered in Bangladesh, Cuba, Nicaragua, Ecuador, Belarus, and Angola. It is the first drug to be developed and registered in Bangladesh. NASVAC is also the 'first novel molecule' to be registered by the Directorate General of Drug Administration of the Bangladesh government.

Mahtab is currently working as the head, Division of Interventional Hepatology, Bangabandhu Sheikh Mujib Medical University (BSMMU).

He is currently associated with Farabi General Hospital, Dhaka-1209 and Labaid Specialized Hospital, Dhanmondi. He also serves at Anwer Khan Modern Medical College Hospital as a specialist hepatologist and gastroenterologist and at Labaid Specialized Hospital, Dhanmondi as a liver and liver cancer specialist and interventional endoscopist divisional head.

=== Affiliations ===
He is four times elected secretary general of the Association for the Study of the Liver Diseases Bangladesh (ASLDB) (the national Hepatology Association of Bangladesh). He is also the founding president of the Bangabandhu Sheikh Mujib Medical University Hepatology Alumni Association and executive chairman of the Forum for the Study of the Liver Bangladesh.

He is the founder general secretary of the Bangladesh Stem Cell and Regenerative Medicine Society.

He has organized several 'first time in Bangladesh' medical conferences, including the first STEMCON in 2017 (1st international conference on stem cell therapy in Bangladesh) and the first EndoVasculoCon in 2019 (1st live conference from endoscopy suit and vascular lab in the region).

He is member secretary of Sampritee Bangladesh.

=== Publications ===
Mahtab has compiled six books, namely 'Liver: A Complete Book on Hepato-Pancreato-Biliary Diseases', published by Elsevier (2009), 'Comprehensive Text Book on Hepatitis B', published by Jaypee (2010), 'Fatty Liver Disease' (2012) and 'Hepatitis Management Update' (2015) published by McMillan and 'Text Book of Hepato-Gastroenterology' (2015) and 'Practical Hepato-Gastroenterology Prescriber' (2016) published by Jaypee.

Mahtab is serving on the editorial boards of several international journals in the fields of hepatology and gastroenterology including,

- Euro-Asian Journal of Hepato-Gastroenterology (Journal of the Euro-Asian Gastroenterological Association) (Co-Editor-in-Chief),
- Hepatology International (journal of Asian Pacific Association for the Study of the Liver) (Associate Editor)
- Journal of Clinical, Experimental Hepatology (journal of Indian Association for the Study of the Liver) (Editorial Board Member),
- Hepatitis B Annual (Kalinga Gastroenterology Foundation, India) (Co-Editor-in-Chief)
