= Shahid Akhtar Hossain =

Shahid Akhtar Hossain is a Bangladeshi academic and vice-chancellor of Eastern University. He is a professor of soil, water and environment and former pro-vice chancellor of the University of Dhaka.

== Early life ==
Hossain completed his PhD at the University of Queensland in sustainable development in 1993. He completed his post doctoral fellowship at the University of Aberdeen.

== Career ==
Hossain was appointed the pro-vice chancellor of the University of Dhaka in June 2012 alongside Nasreen Ahmad under Vice-Chancellor AAMS Arefin Siddique. This was the first time the University of Dhaka had two vice-chancellors. He was the dean of the Faculty of Biological Science. He headed the investigation committee that investigated Md Azharul Islam of the Department of Law for allegedly tempering grades in 2015.

Hossain was appointed vice-chancellor of Eastern University on 1 November 2018. He was nominated to the board of directors of Palli Karma-Sahayak Foundation.

In March 2023, Hossain was re-vice-chancellor of Eastern University.
