= Mymensingh Medical College =

Governmental medical college and hospital in Mymensingh, Bangladesh

- ময়মনসিংহ মেডিকেল কলেজ
- Emblem of MMC
- Other name: MMC
- Former name: Lytton Medical School
- Type: Public Medical College
- Established: 1962; 64 years ago
- Academic affiliations: University of Dhaka Bangladesh Medical University
- Principal: Professor Dr. Mostofa Zahid Kamal
- Director of Hospital: Brigadier General Md Zakir Hossain
- Students: 1,400
- Location: Medical College Road, Charpara, Mymensingh, Mymensingh Division, Bangladesh; 24.7416°N 90.4093°E
- Campus: Urban 84 acres
- Language: English
- Website: mmc.gov.bd

Mymensingh Medical College (MMC; Bengali: ময়মনসিংহ মেডিকেল কলেজ), formerly Lytton Medical School, is a public medical college and hospital in Mymensingh, Bangladesh.

The institute was established in 1924 during the British Raj under the former name. Today, Mymensingh Medical College provides undergraduate education in MBBS and BDS, along with postgraduate programmes in a range of medical disciplines. Its academic activities are closely integrated with Mymensingh Medical College Hospital, allowing students to progress from basic medical sciences to clinical training in the hospital setting. The college campus occupies about 84 acres, while the adjoining hospital has a capacity of 1,000 beds.

== History ==
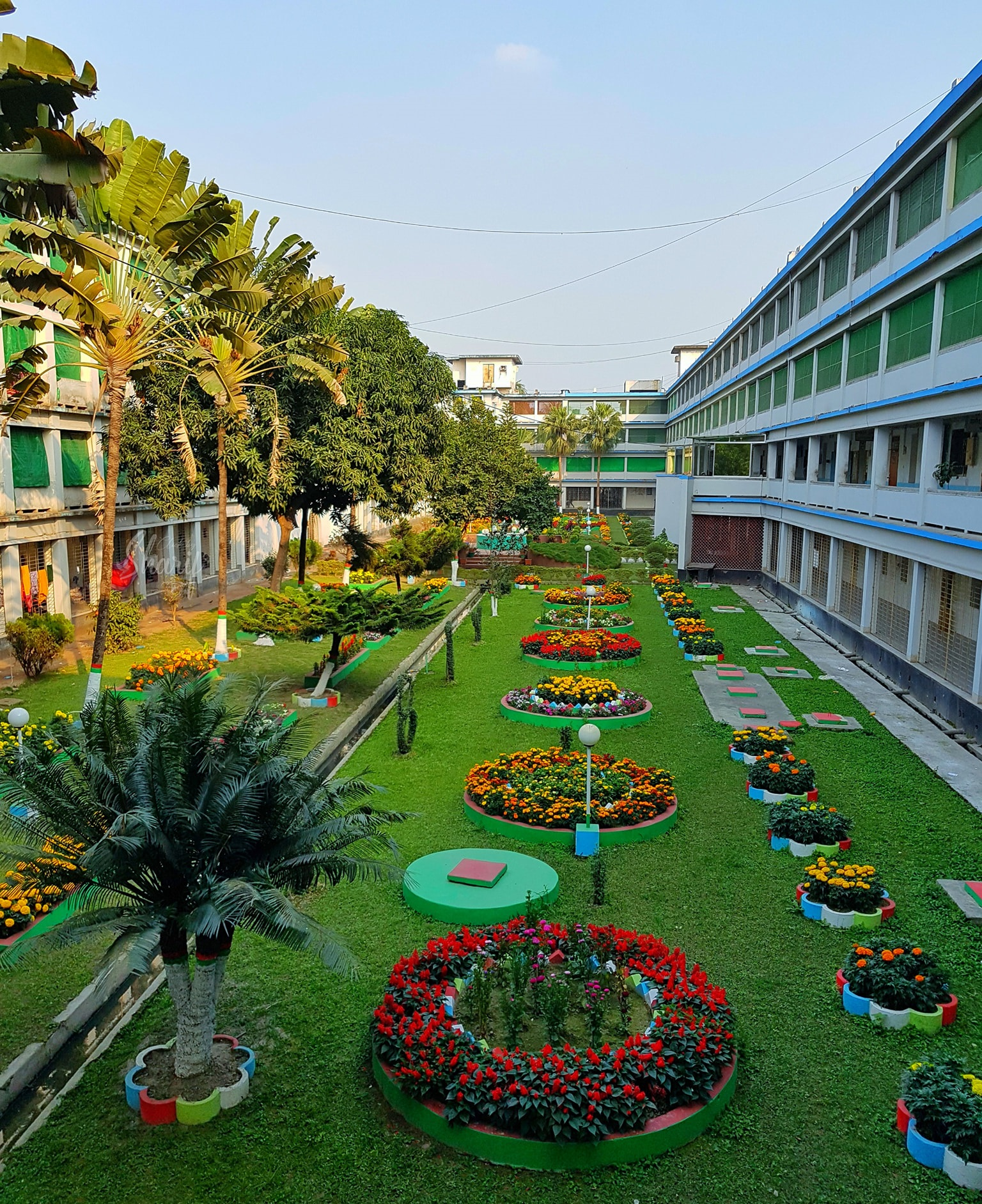
Mymensingh Medical College and Hospital

The history of Mymensingh Medical College goes back to the British period. During the later part of British Raj, it was felt that what was then Campbell Medical School of Calcutta and Mitford Medical School of Dhaka were unable to cater the needs of the growing population. As a result, in 1924 the Earl of Lytton, then-governor of Bengal, established the school in Mymensingh under the name "Lytton Medical School". As a four-year college for the Licentiate of Medical Faculty (LMF).

=== Establishment of the college ===
The LMF course continued till 1962, when Lytton Medical School was upgraded and renamed Mymensingh Medical College. The institution then began its MBBS programme, with 32 students forming the first batch, M-01. This marked the transition from the earlier LMF-based medical school to a modern medical college offering undergraduate medical education. The college became academically affiliated with the University of Dhaka.

=== Expansion ===
For the first few decades, the institution operated from its earlier location at Baghmara. In 1972, the college and hospital were shifted to the present campus at Charpara, on approximately 84 acres of land. A four-storey college building was constructed, with the hospital located next to it. The new campus allowed the academic and clinical sides of the institution to develop together, with the preclinical and paraclinical departments based in the college building and the clinical departments associated with the hospital.

MMC Lecture Gallery 2

The institution continued to expand its academic activities beyond undergraduate medical education. Postgraduate training was introduced in different disciplines, and Mymensingh Medical College also developed its own scientific publication, the Mymensingh Medical Journal, which is listed in Index Medicus/MEDLINE according to the college's official website.

Over the years, Mymensingh Medical College and its associated hospital have grown considerably from the small medical school established in 1924. Today, the college provides MBBS and BDS education as well as postgraduate training in several disciplines, while Mymensingh Medical College Hospital serves as a major teaching and referral hospital for Mymensingh and the surrounding region. Its history therefore reflects a gradual transition from a medical school offering the LMF course to a large institution combining undergraduate and postgraduate medical education with clinical service.

== Undergraduate courses ==
=== MBBS ===
The main undergraduate medical programme at Mymensingh Medical College is the Bachelor of Medicine and Bachelor of Surgery (MBBS) course. The college currently admits 225 Bangladeshi students to the MBBS programme each year. Admission to the undergraduate MBBS course is conducted through the Directorate General of Health Services (DGHS).

The MBBS course follows the curriculum prescribed by the Bangladesh Medical & Dental Council (BM&DC). The curriculum is divided into four phases.

The first phase, Phase I covers

- Anatomy
- Physiology
- Biochemistry

Phase II covers

- Pharmacology & Therapeutics
- Forensic Medicine & Toxicology

Phase III, covers

- Community Medicine & Public Health
- Pathology
- Microbiology

The final phase, Phase IV covers

- Medicine and Allied Subjects
- Surgery and Allied Subjects
- Obstetrics & Gynaecology

=== BDS ===
Alongside MBBS, Mymensingh Medical College also offers BDS (Bachelor of Dental Surgery) as an undergraduate programme which started in 2011.

== Principals ==
| Sl No | Name | From | To |
|---|---|---|---|
| 1 | Lt. Col. A. F. M. Burhanuddin | 03-09-1963 | 07-02-1964 |
| 2 | Dr. (Capt.) Md. Saifullah | 08-02-1964 | 11-06-1967 |
| 3 | Dr. Md. Abdur Rahman | 12-06-1967 | 18-05-1969 |
| 4 | Dr. (Major) Ahmed Ali Chowdhury | 19-05-1969 | 05-01-1970 |
| 5 | Dr. Md. Abdur Rahman | 06-01-1970 | 06-02-1972 |
| 6 | Dr. Md. Momtazur Rahman | 07-02-1972 | 16-02-1972 |
| 7 | Dr. Md. Fazlul Karim | 17-02-1972 | 17-03-1972 |
| 8 | Dr. (Major) Ahmed Ali Chowdhury | 18-03-1972 | 27-05-1975 |
| 9 | Dr. Fazlul Karim | 28-05-1975 | 24-06-1977 |
| 10 | Professor Md. Nayeb Ali | 25-06-1977 | 11-03-1979 |
| 11 | Dr. Md. Kamaruzzaman | 12-03-1979 | 29-02-1980 |
| 12 | Professor Shamsuddin Ahmed | 01-03-1980 | 03-03-1980 |
| 13 | Professor Md. Nayeb Ali | 04-03-1980 | 10-06-1980 |
| 14 | Professor Shamsuddin Ahmed | 11-06-1980 | 08-09-1981 |
| 15 | Professor A. I. M. Mafakhkharul Islam | 09-09-1981 | 05-03-1990 |
| 16 | Professor M. Zubaid Hussain | 06-03-1990 | 30-06-1990 |
| 17 | Professor M. Abdul Haque | 29-06-1990 | 02-07-1990 |
| 18 | Professor M. Abdul Jalil | 03-07-1990 | 31-08-1990 |
| 19 | Professor A. I. M. Mafakhkharul Islam | 01-09-1990 | 26-12-1990 |
| 20 | Professor M. Abdul Haque | 27-12-1990 | 22-05-1991 |
| 21 | Professor A. I. M. Mafakhkharul Islam | 23-05-1991 | 20-07-1992 |
| 22 | Professor M. Abdul Jalil | 24-07-1992 | 30-12-1992 |
| 23 | Professor Shah Monir Hossain | 31-12-1992 | 04-02-1993 |
| 24 | Professor Md. Nurul Islam | 05-02-1993 | 20-05-1996 |
| 25 | Professor Abdullah Akhtar Ahmed | 21-05-1996 | 07-09-1996 |
| 26 | Professor Shah Monir Hossain | 08-09-1996 | 22-09-1996 |
| 27 | Professor Abdullah Akhtar Ahmed | 23-09-1996 | 24-05-1998 |
| 28 | Professor Md. Nurul Islam | 25-05-1998 | 13-07-1998 |
| 29 | Professor Abdullah Akhtar Ahmed | 14-07-1998 | 13-01-1999 |
| 30 | Professor Abdul Khalique barbhuiya | 17-01-1999 | 12-08-1999 |
| 31 | Professor Md. Safiur Rahman | 25-08-1999 | 02-11-2001 |
| 32 | Professor M. A. Ghani | 03-11-2001 | 29-12-2001 |
| 33 | Professor Abdullah Akhtar Ahmed | 26-01-2002 | 13-05-2006 |
| 34 | Professor Md. Monwar Hossain | 14-05-2006 | 23-07-2008 |
| 35 | Professor. Dr.Saiyeedur Rahman (incharge) | 23-07-2008 | 10-02-2009 |
| 36 | Professor Dr. Shah Abdul Latif | 11-02-2009 | 13-11-2009 |
| 37 | Professor Dr. Chandanendu Bhushan Sarker | 14-11-2009 | 28-11-2009 |
| 38 | Professor Dr. Mirza Hamidul Huq | 28-11-2009 | 29-03-2010 |
| 39 | Professor Dr. Md. Aminul Haque | 29-03-2010 | 25-10-2010 |
| 40 | Professor Md. Matiur Rahman | 19-07-2011 | 30-12-2015 |
| 41 | Professor Dr. Sankar Narayan Das | 03-02-2016 | 29-12-2016 |
| 42 | Professor Dr. Md. Anwar Hossain | 16-01-2017 | 29-09-2019 |
| 43 | Professor Dr. Chitta Ranjan Debnath | 07-10-2019 | 14-05-2022 |
| 44 | Professor Dr. Aftab Uddin Ahmed | 29-06-2022 | 22-10-2022 |
| 45 | Professor Dr. A. K. M. Ahsan Habib | 22-10-2022 | 24-10-2022 |
| 46 | Professor Dr. Md. Abdul Kader | 09-11-2022 | 09-09-2024 |
| 47 | Professor Dr. Md. Nazmul Alam Khan | 01-10-2024 | 11-08-2026 |

== Journal ==
Mymensingh Medical Journal, which is Index Medicus/MEDLINE listed, is the official journal of Mymensingh Medical College.

== Notable alumni ==
- Tandi Dorji, Foreign Minister of Bhutan
- Kamrul Hasan Khan, Vice-Chancellor of Bangabandhu Sheikh Mujib Medical University (2015–2018)
- Deen Mohammad Noorul Huq
- Mehdi Hasan Khan, software developer
- AKMA Muqtadir, ophthalmologist, recipient of Independence Award
- Harishankar Das, ophthalmologist, recipient of Independence Award
- Taslima Nasrin, exiled writer
- Lotay Tshering, Prime Minister of Bhutan (2018-2023)
- Baharul Alam, 31st Inspector General of Bangladesh Police
- AZM Zahid Hossain
- ARM Luthful Kabir, pediatricians
- Murad Hasan
- Anwarul Ashraf Khan
- Syeda Zakia Noor Lipi
- Mamun Al Mahtab
- Md. Habibe Millat
- Mohammad Matiur Rahman

== Gallery ==
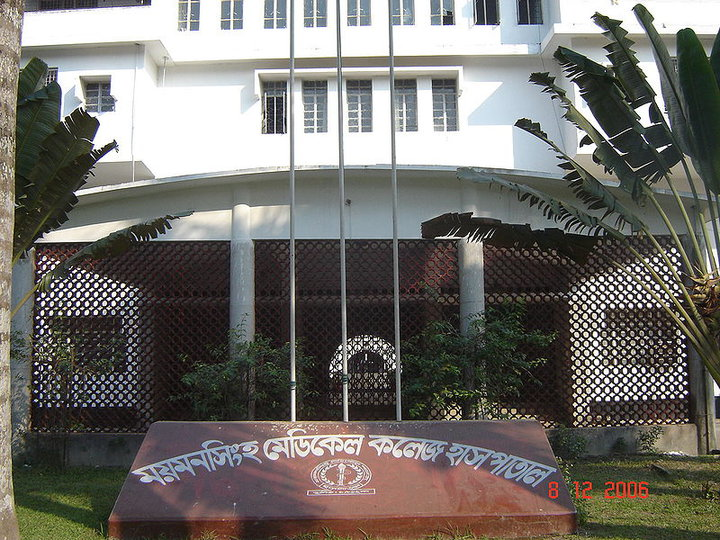
Foundation Of MMCH

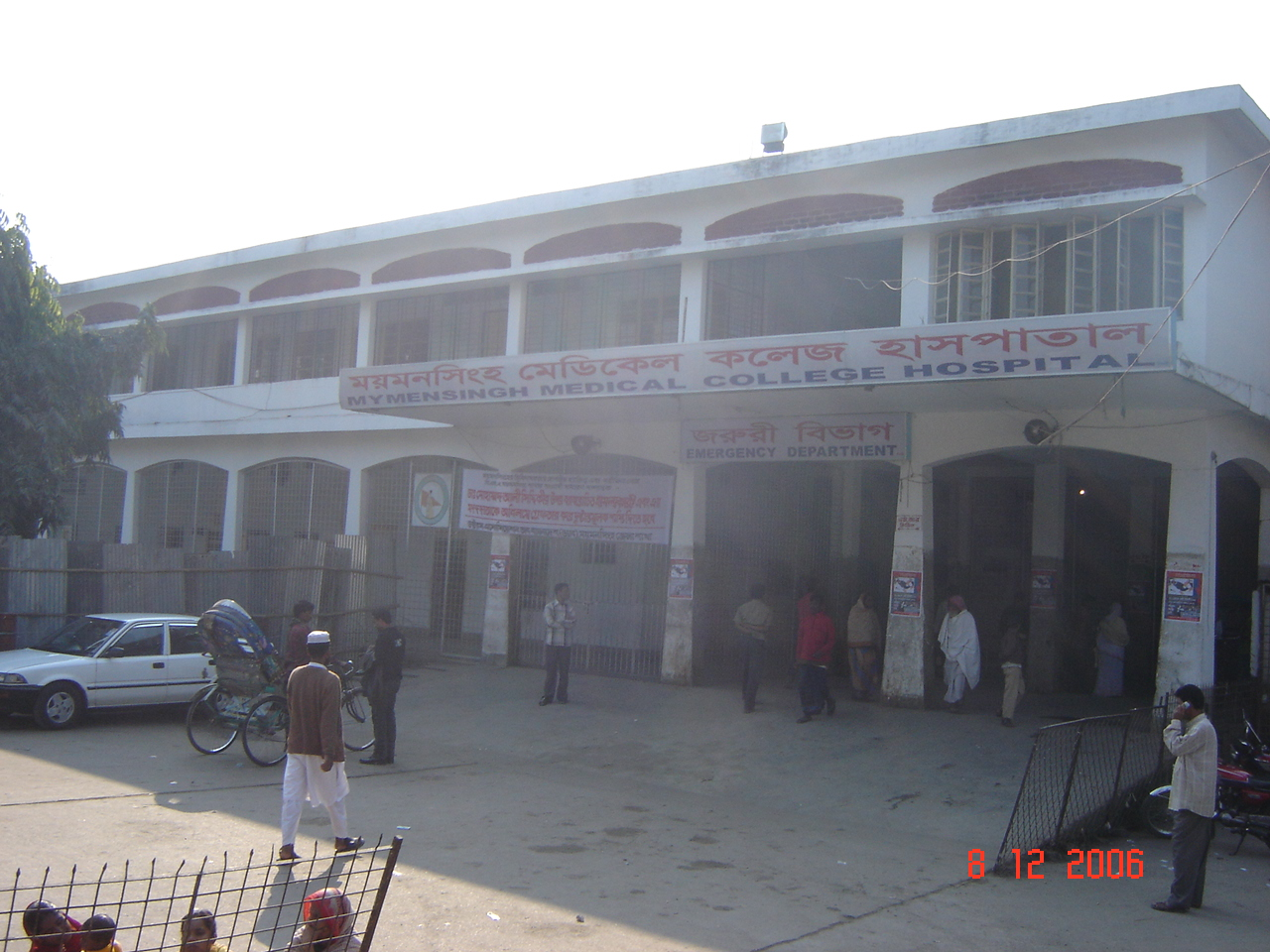
Mymensingh Medical College Hospital

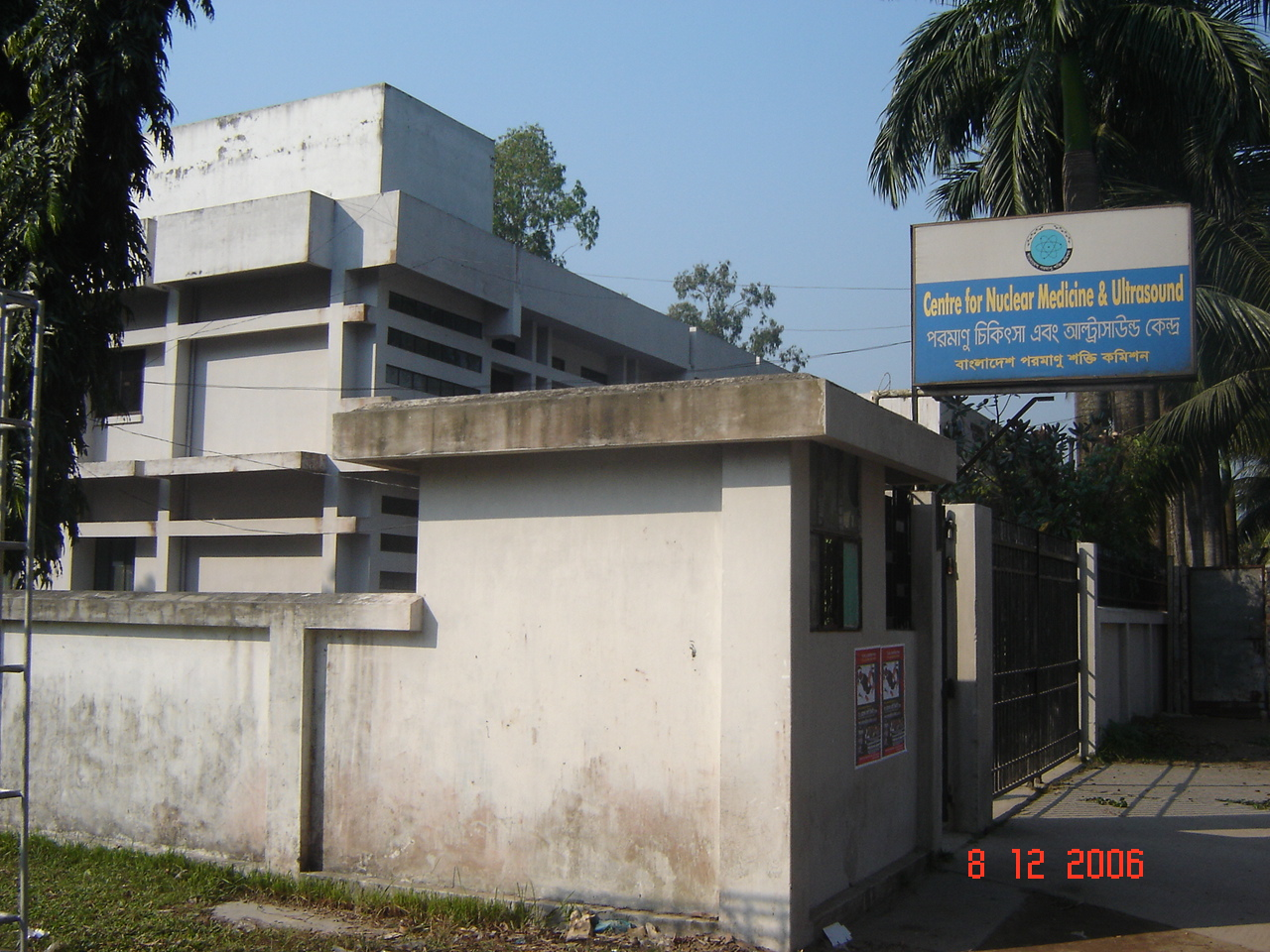
Centre for Nuclear Medicine and Ultrasound in MMCH

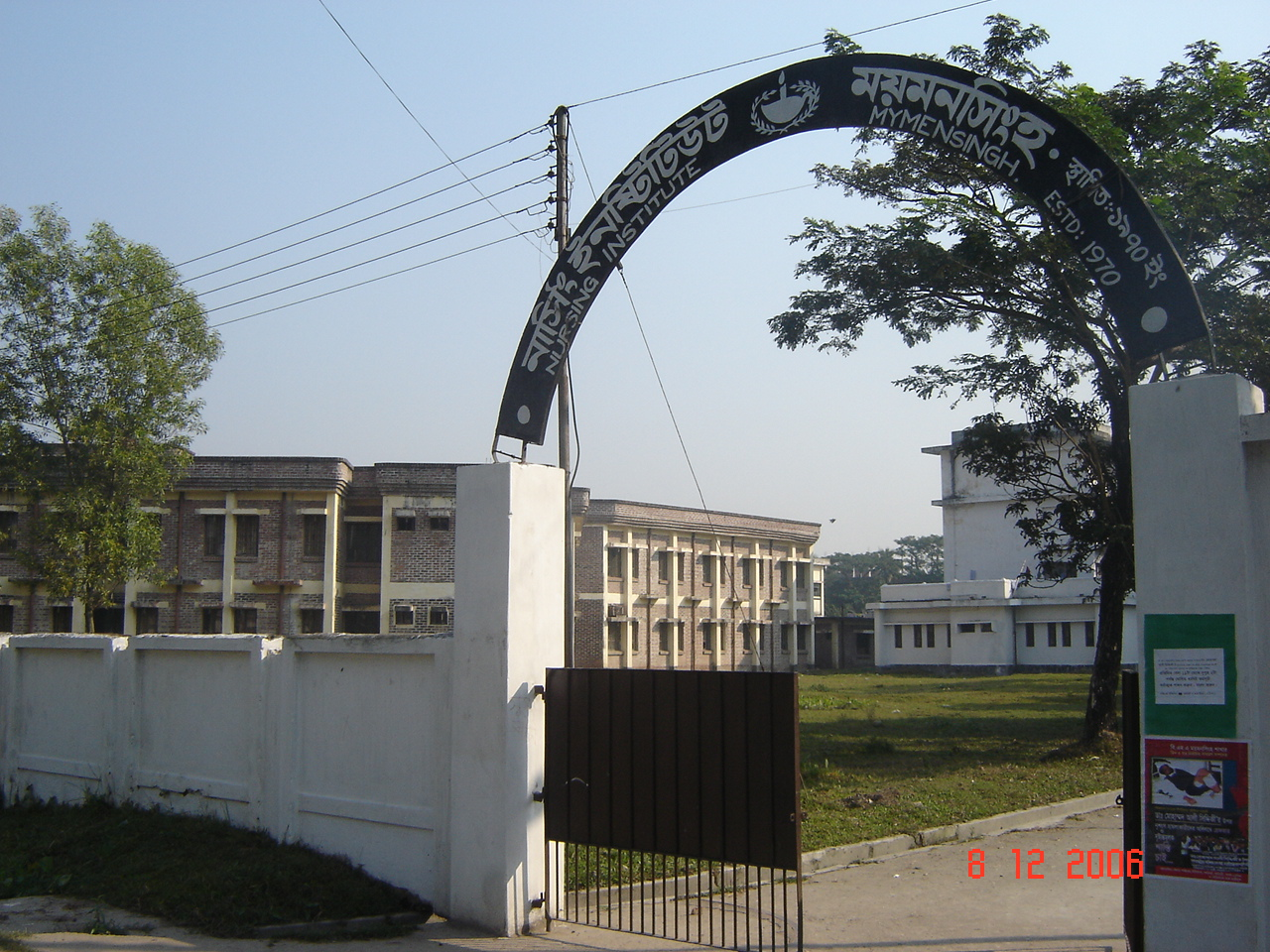
Nursing Institute in MMCH

== See also ==
- List of medical colleges in Bangladesh
