= Harishankar Das =

Bangladeshi ophthalmologist

- হরিশঙ্কর দাস
- Born: Tangail
- Education: Mymensingh Medical College (MBBS)

Harishankar Das is a Bangladeshi ophthalmologist. He was awarded the Independence Award, the highest civilian award in Bangladesh, for his contribution in medical science in 2024.

== Early life ==
Das was born in the village of Nikla, located in the Bhuapur upazila of Tangail. He completed his MBBS degree at Mymensingh Medical College in 1974. After that, he pursued further studies in Vienna, Austria, where he earned a postgraduate degree.

Over the years, he served in various capacities at the eye department of Mymensingh Medical College and Hospital, including Clinical Assistant, Registrar, and Resident Surgeon. He also held the position of chief surgeon with the Bangladesh National Society for the Blind (BNSB).

== Awards ==
- Sheba Ratna Purushkar (2004) by Mymensingh Sheba Niketan
- Lifetime Achievement Award (2011) by Bangladesh Ophthalmological Society
- Independence Award (2024) by the government of Bangladesh
- Asian Scientist 100 (2025) by Asian Scientist
