= Nurul Islam (academic) =

Bangladeshi academic

- নূরুল ইসলাম

5th Vice-Chancellor of Eastern University (Bangladesh)
- In office 6 September 2011 – 30 September 2013
- Preceded by: A.K.M.Saiful Majid
- Succeeded by: Abdur Rab

Personal details
- Born: 25 September 1939 Shahrasti, Bengal, British India
- Died: 22 November 2017 (aged 78) Dhaka, Bangladesh
- Education: Ulster University; University of Leeds; University of Dhaka
- Occupation: Academic, Academic administrator

Nurul Islam (Bengali: নূরুল ইসলাম; 25 September 1939 – 22 November 2017) was a Bangladeshi academic, and academic administrator, who specialised in English literature, especially the works of the English novelist Graham Greene. He was the founding chairman of the English Department and dean of the faculty of Arts and Humanities at Jahangirnagar University and vice-chancellor of Eastern University (Bangladesh).

== Early life and education ==
Islam was born and raised in Waruk village in Shahrasti, Chandpur. He was the son of Shah Golam Kader, long-serving Union Chairman and Sharifatunessa. He studied at Icchapura High School and Chandpur College. In 1962 he graduated from the University of Dhaka with a M.A. degree in English. He then completed a Postgraduate Diploma in English Studies at the University of Leeds in the U.K. in the 1960s. During the 1970s he earned a D.Phil. (PhD) from Ulster University in Northern Ireland. His PhD thesis was am existentialist interpretation of the contemporary English novelist Graham Greene, later published in book form with the title 'Graham Greene: An Inverted Humanist'.

== Academic career ==
Islam started his long university career at University of Chittagong in the late 1960s. However, in 1970 he became the founding chairman and organizer of the Department of English at Jahangirnagar University in 1970 (as Md. Nurul Islam, as he was known at the time). He taught there for nearly three decades. At various times he also was the president, vice-president and general secretary of the Jahangirnagar University Teachers' Association. He won the University Grants Commission Award for research work in 1988. In the early-1990s he took lien from Jahangirnagar for a research and teaching stint at Michigan State University in the US as a Fulbright scholar. Subsequently, he became the Dean of faculty of Arts and Humanities at Jahangirnagar. He then joined the Institute of Languages and Translation at King Saud University in Saudi Arabia, retiring from Jahangirnagar in 1998. Upon moving back to Bangladesh in the mid-2000s, he joined Eastern University (Bangladesh) as the dean of the faculty of Arts. In 2011, he was appointed as the vice-chancellor of the university. He retired in 2016.

== Personal life ==
Islam was married to Sauda Akthter, retired professor and Chairperson of Bengali Department at Jahangirnagar University. They have two sons and one daughter and three grandchildren. He died on November 22, 2017, and was laid to rest at his ancestral home in the village of Waruk in Shahrasti.

== Selected publications ==
- D. H. Lawrence : His early writings (Sahitya Samabaya, 1984). National Public Libraries Catalog, DDC classification: 823 / N939d
- The State of English in Bangladesh Today. Seminar papers and proceedings of the first convention of English Association of Bangladesh held at Jahangirnagar University on June 12–13, 1982) edited as General Secretary of the Association, 1986. Google Books
- Graham Greene, An Inverted Humanist (Jahangirnagar University, 1987). Google Books
- Tales of Human Endeavour (1992). Selected by NCTB Bangladesh as compulsory rapid reader for classes IX-X 1992–1994.

Besides these books, Islam wrote articles in English and Bengali in research journals. He also edited Harvest, the annual research jourtnal of the Department of English and The Jahangirnagar Review, Part-C, the annual review journal of the Faculty of Arts and Humanities of Jahangirnagar University for many years.
