= Eastern University (Bangladesh) =

Private university in Bangladesh

Coordinates: 23.7428°N 90.3806°E

- ইস্টার্ন ইউনিভার্সিটি বাংলাদেশ
- Other name: EU
- Motto: Distinction in Education
- Type: Private
- Established: 2003; 23 years ago
- Accreditation: IEB, BBC, PCB
- Affiliations: University Grants Commission(UGC)
- Chairman: Barrister Safayet Mohammad Raju
- Chancellor: President Hafiz Uddin Ahmad
- Vice-Chancellor: Farid Ahammad Sobhani
- Faculty: 231 (130 are full time)
- Total staff: 320
- Students: 11793 as of (2013)
- Location: Road 6, Block B, Ashulia Model Town Khagan, Birulia, Savar, Dhaka, Bangladesh., Ashulia, Dhaka, Bangladesh
- Campus: 8 acres (3.2 ha); Urban
- Colors: Dodger blue, yellow and white
- Website: www.easternuni.edu.bd

The Eastern University (Bengali: ইস্টার্ন ইউনিভার্সিটি) is a private university located in Ashulia, Savar, Dhaka, Bangladesh. The Eastern University was established in 2003 under the Private University Act 1992, and later on approved under Private University Act of 2010. The university was set up by Eastern University Foundation.

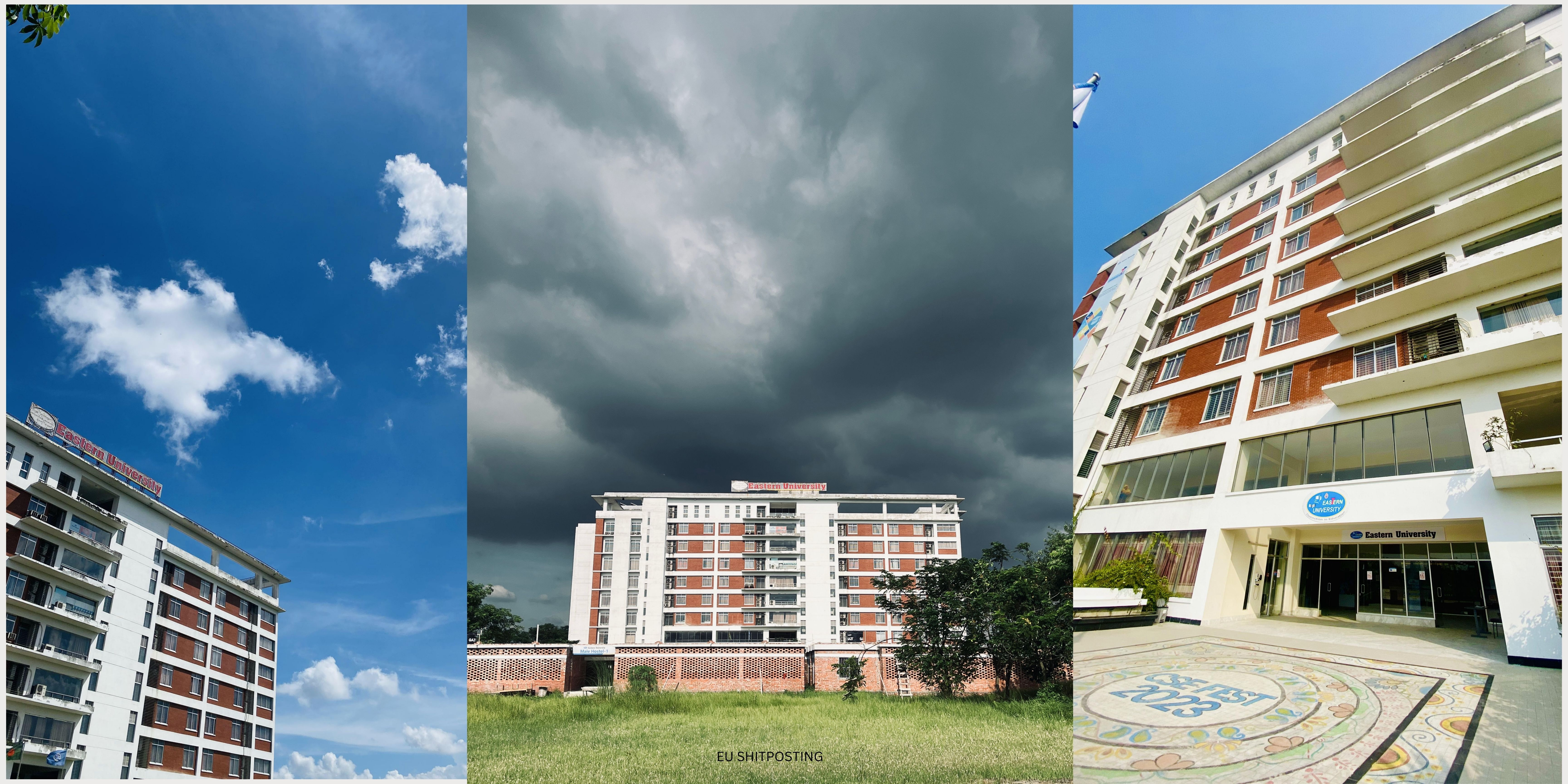
EU Permanent Campus

== Campus ==
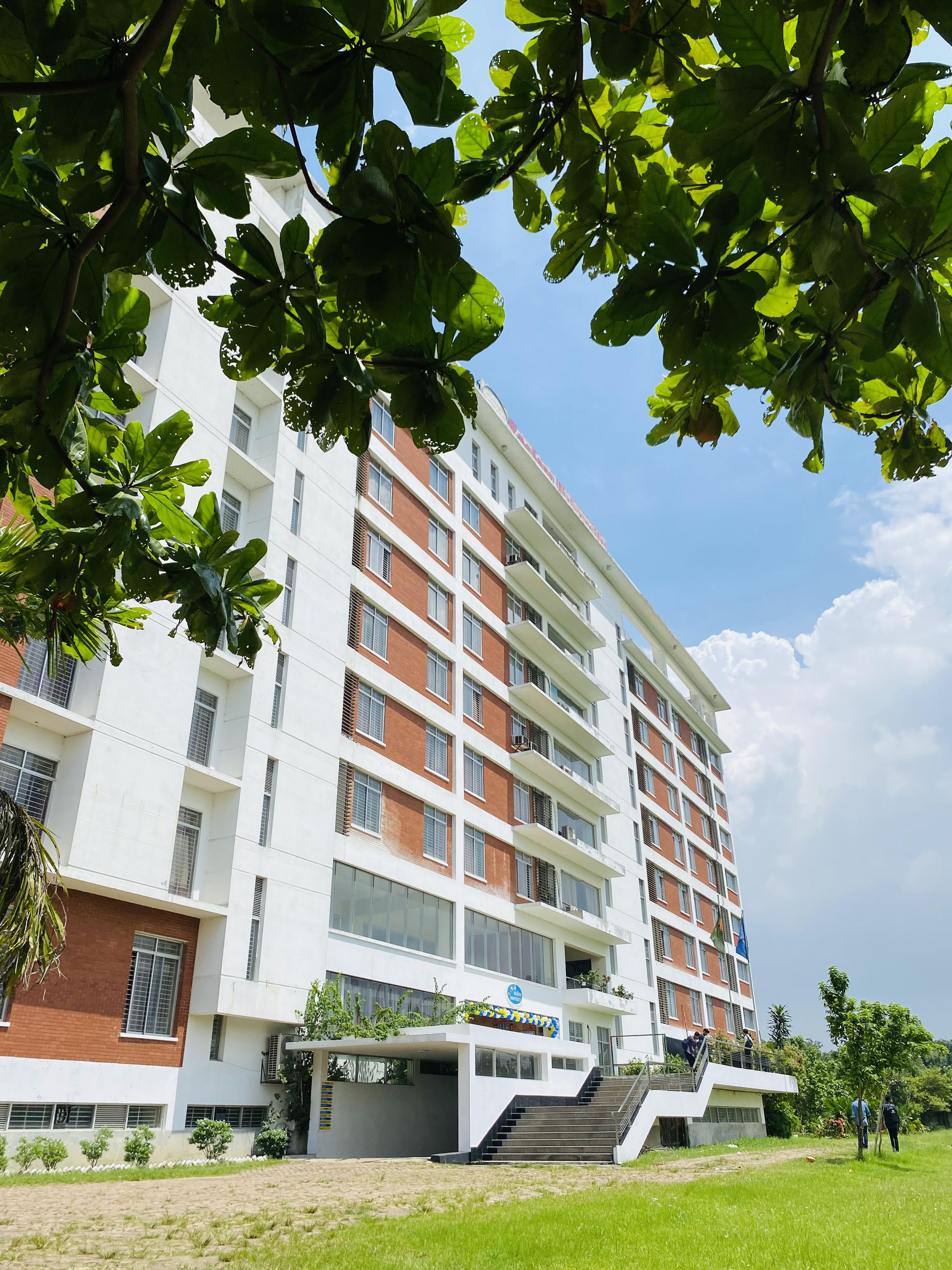
INFORNT MAIN BUILDING of EU Campus

The university campus is located on Road 6, Block B, Ashulia Model Town, Savar, Dhaka-1345. The university campus covers about 8 acres of land.

== Schools and Departments ==
The university has five Schools: School of Arts, School of Business, School of Engineering, School of Law an School of Life Science]. The School of Arts has one departments – the Department of English. The School of Business has four major areas, namely, Accounting, Finance, Marketing, Management, and Human Resource. The School of Business at Eastern University has come up with the BBA Program in Islamic Finance, Banking and Insurance. A few social science courses are also offered by the School. The School of Engineering has three departments, namely the Department of Computer Science & Information Technology, the Department of Electrical and Electronic Engineering and the Civil Engineering. The School of Law has an undergraduate and postgraduate program. The School of Science - The Department of Pharmacy. Approval of the Department of Textile Engineering is under consideration by UGC.

== List of vice- chancellors ==
- A.K.Fazlul H. Shah (3 April 2003 - 1 May 2006)
- Rahim B.Talukdar (2 May 2006 - 31 July 2010)
- Abdur Rab (1 August 2010 - 5 September 2010)
- A.K.M.Saiful Majid (6 September 2010 - 5 September 2011)
- Nurul Islam (6 September 2011 - 30 September 2013)
- Abdur Rab (1 October 2013 - 31 October 2017)
- Md.Nurul Islam (5 November 2017 - 25 May 2018)
- Engr. Aminul Hoque (26 May 2018 - 31 October 2018)
- Shahid Akhtar Hossain (1 November 2018 – 6 April 2025)
- Md. Shamsul Huda (7 April 2025 – 23 May 2025)
- Farid Ahammad Sobhani (24 May 2025 – present)

== Academics ==
=== Programmes ===
School of Business

- BBA (Bachelor of Business Administration) Program
- MBA (Master of Business Administration) Program
- EMBA (Executive Master of Business Administration) Program

School of Engineering

- B.Sc. CSE (Computer Science and Engineering)
- B.Sc. in CE (Civil Engineering)
- B.Sc. EEE (Electrical and Electronic Engineering)

Approval for the B.Sc. in Textile Engineering is under consideration by UGC. Other programs to be launched include Post-Graduate Diploma in Environment and Climate Change

School of Law

- Bachelor of Law (Hons.)
- Master of Laws (1-year program)

School of Arts

- Bachelor of Arts (Hons.) in English
- Master of Arts in English Language and literature
- Masters in English language teaching (ELT) (1-year program)
- Masters in English language teaching (ELT) (2-year program)

School of Life Science

- Bachelor of Pharmacy

=== Curriculum ===
Eastern University follows the North American model of the curriculum in the fields of Business Administration, Computer Science and Electrical and Electronics Engineering, the UK model in Law and English. The academic program is pursued through a curriculum that includes splitting up of an academic year into two semesters: the Spring and the Summer.

=== Session ===
The academic session of EU is a three-semester cycle: Spring, Summer and Fall.

=== Faculty members ===
The university has 231 full-time and part-time faculty members out of which 47 are Ph.D. including a visiting professor from the United States.

== Research and publications ==
The university has a research center known as the Centre for Research and Development. In addition to facilitating research studies and consultancy projects, it organizes research, seminars and training on research methodology. The university publishes a biannual refereed journal - The Eastern University Journal.

== Notable alumni ==
=== Literature, media and entertainment ===
- Sabnam Faria, actress and model
- Mumtaheena Toya, actress and model
- Bobby Haque, actress, model and film producer

== Footnotes ==
- About Eastern University
- International Academic Collaboration

Citations
