= Phulpur, Mymensingh =

Phulpur ফুলপুর
- Town and Municipality
- Location in Bangladesh
- Coordinates: 24.9550°N 90.3573°E
- Country: Bangladesh
- Division: Mymensingh Division
- District: Mymensingh District
- Upazila: Phulpur Upazila

Government
  - Type: Municipality
  - Body: Phulpur Municipality

Area
  - Total: 10.1 km^{2} (3.9 sq mi)

Population (2011)
  - Total: 25,628
  - Density: 2,540/km^{2} (6,570/sq mi)
- Time zone: UTC+6 (BST)

Phulpur (Bengali: ফুলপুর) is a town and municipality in Mymensingh District in the division of Mymensingh, Bangladesh. It is the administrative headquarters and urban centre of Phulpur Upazila.
