= Brajendra Kishore Roy Chowdhury =

Indian zamindar, patron of music and educationist

- ব্রজেন্দ্র কিশোর রায় চৌধুরী
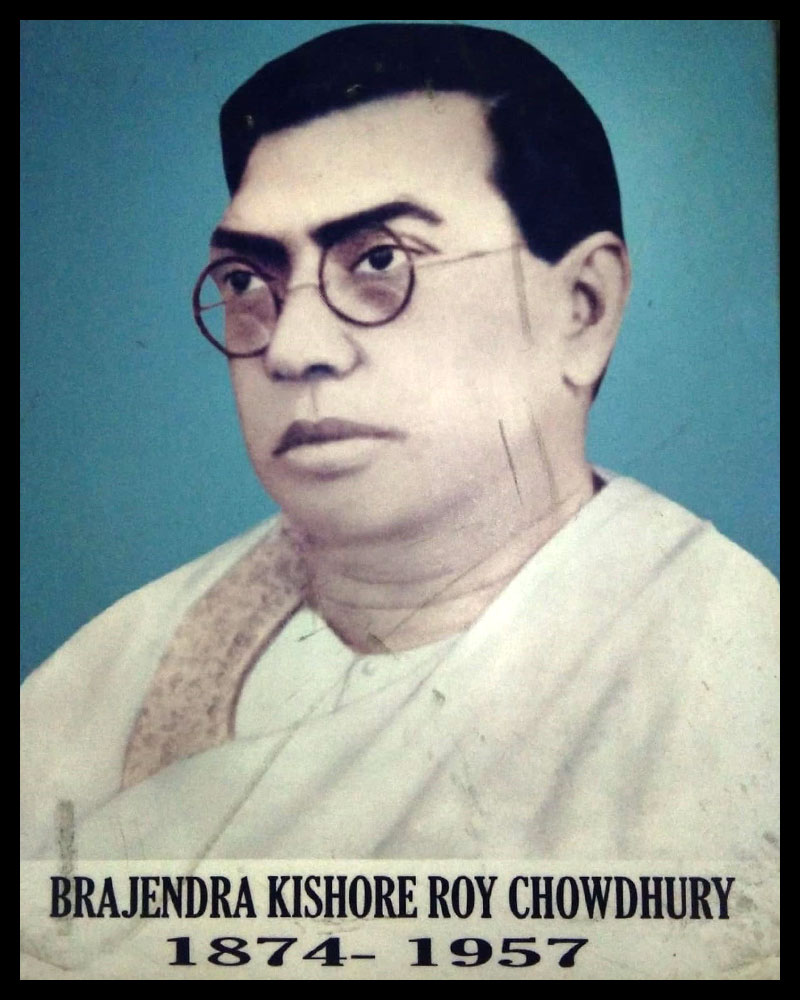
- Born: 12 May 1874; Balihar, Naogaon District, Rajshahi Division, British Bengal (now Bangladesh)
- Died: 29 November 1957 (aged 83); Kolkata, West Bengal, India
- Citizenship: British Indian (1874–1947); Indian (1947–1957)
- Occupations: Zamindar, patron of music, educationist, philanthropist
- Known for: Patronage of Indian classical music, contributions to the National Council of Education
- Title: Landlord of Gouripur
- Predecessor: Rajendra Kishore Roy Chowdhury (adoptive father)
- Successor: Birendra Kishore Roy Chaudhury (son)
- Children: Birendra Kishore Roy Choudhury
- Parent(s): Hariprasad Bhattacharya (biological father); Rajendra Kishore Roy Chowdhury (adoptive father); Bishweswari Devi (adoptive mother)

Brajendra Kishore Roy Chowdhury (বাংলা ২৯ বৈশাখ ১২৮১/12 May 1874 – 29 November 1957) was the fifth male landlord of Gouripur Rajbari in Gouripur upazila of Mymensingh. He was a prominent patron of Indian classical music and played a vital role in the national education movement.

== Early life ==
Brajendra Kishore was born in Balihar, Naogaon, in the Rajshahi Division. He was the adopted son of Rajendra Kishore Roy Chowdhury and Bishweswari Devi.

== Contributions to education and society ==
He was a leading philanthropist who contributed significantly to the education sector of Bengal, donating approximately 4.5 million BDT (in contemporary value) for educational purposes. He was one of the principal patrons of the National Council of Education, which later evolved into Jadavpur University, Calcutta.

He established several educational institutions, including:

- Gouripur Rajendra Kishore Government High School (1911), named after his father.
- Ishwarganj Bisweswari Government Pilot High School (1916), named after his mother.
- Madhyanagar Bisweswari Public High School and College (1920) in Sunamganj.

In 1939, he served as a member of the Floud Commission. Notably, he refused the title of "Raja" offered by the British Government as a mark of his personal and nationalistic stance.

== Patronage of arts and nature ==
Brajendra Kishore was a deep lover of nature and music. He established a botanical garden spanning 49.5 acres (150 bighas) around his palace in Gouripur. He also built the "Gouripur House" in Kalimpong, India, which was famously visited by Rabindranath Tagore on four occasions between 1938 and 1940.

His son was Pandit Birendra Kishore Roy Chaudhuri, an eminent sitar player and a founder of the music department at Rabindra Bharati University.

== Writings ==
- Marxism and the Indian Ideal (1941)

== See also ==
- Birendra Kishore Roy Choudhury
