= Sharif Ahmed (Bangladeshi politician) =

Bangladeshi politician

- শরীফ আহমেদ
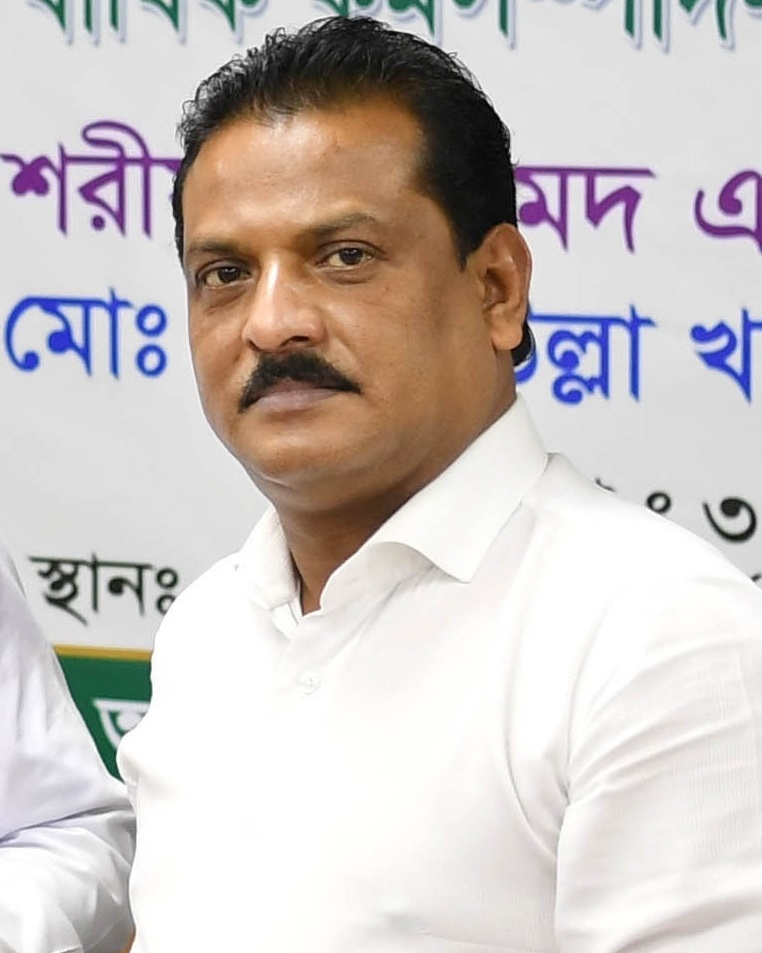
- Ahmed in Dhaka (2021)

State Minister of Housing and Public Works
- In office 13 February 2020 – 11 January 2024

State Minister of Social Welfare
- In office 7 January 2019 – 13 February 2020
- Succeeded by: Ashraf Ali Khan Khasru

Member of the Bangladesh Parliament for Mymensingh-2
- In office 24 January 2014 – 6 August 2024
- Preceded by: Hayatur Rahman Khan

Personal details
- Born: 25 January 1970 (age 56) Mymensingh, East Pakistan, Pakistan
- Party: Bangladesh Awami League
- Parent: Md. Shamsul Haque (father)

Sharif Ahmed is a Bangladesh Awami League politician and a former Jatiya Sangsad member representing the Mymensingh-2 constituency. He has served as state minister in Sheikh Hasina's 4th cabinet.

== Early life ==
Sharif Ahmed was born on 25 January 1970 in Mymensingh in the then East Pakistan. He has a B.A. degree. His father Md. Shamsul Haque, was a Member of Parliament.

== Political life ==
Sharif Ahmed was elected to Member of Parliament from Mymensingh-2 as a candidate of the Bangladesh Awami League in 2014. Bangladesh Election Commission complained against him to the Prime Minister's Office and Speaker of Parliament for threatening the commissions officers over a mayoral election on 20 January 2016. He was elected to Member of Parliament from Mymensingh-2 as a candidate of the Bangladesh Awami League in 2024.

Ahmed was sentenced to 18 years to prison in a case over allocation of plots in Purbachal to Sheikh Hasina and her family members.
