= Md. Nurul Islam (Assam politician) =

Indian politician (born 1981)

Md. Nurul Islam (born 1981) is an Indian politician from the northeastern state of Assam. He was a member of the Assam Legislative Assembly from Srijangram Assembly constituency in Bongaigaon district representing the Indian National Congress.

Islam is from Srijangram, Bongaigaon district, Assam. He is the son of the late Abdul Mannan. He did his B.Sc at Abhyapuri College which is affiliated with Gauhati University in 2003.

== Career ==
Islam won the Srijangram Assembly constituency representing the Indian National Congress in the 2026 Assam Legislative Assembly election. He polled 1,06,716 votes and defeated his nearest rival, Rejaul Karim Sarkar of the All India United Democratic Front, by a margin of 18,305 votes.
