= AKMA Muqtadir =

Bangladeshi ophthalmologist

- এ কে এম এ মুক্‌তাদির
- Education: Mymensingh Medical College
- Occupation: Ophthalmologist
- Awards: Independence Day Award

AKMA Muqtadir is a Bangladeshi ophthalmologist. He is a former head of ophthalmology department of Dhaka Medical College and Hospital. He was awarded Independence Day Award for his contribution to the medical science by the Government of Bangladesh in 2020.

== Education and career ==
Muqtadir completed his MBBS from Mymensingh Medical College in 1975. He founded Dr Muqtadir Eye Hospital at Nayapara village in Gouripur Upazila, Mymensingh District in 2004.

== Personal life ==
Muqtadir is married to Mahmuda Khatun.
