= Mozibur Rahman Fakir =

Bangladeshi politician

State Minister for Youth and Sports
- In office 2001–2016

Personal details
- Born: 7 January 1947 Mymensingh
- Died: 2 May 2016 (aged 69) Dhaka
- Party: Bangladesh Awami League

Mozibur Rahman Fakir (7 January 1947 – 2 May 2016) was a Bangladeshi Awami League politician who was state minister of Health and Family Welfare. He represented Mymensingh-3.

== Biography ==
Fakir was born on 7 January 1947. He graduated from Mymensingh medical college in 1970, then joined the medical corps of the Bangladesh Army. He was elected to parliament from Mymensingh in 2001. He fought in the Bangladesh Liberation War. He founded Nasima Nursing Home in Mymensingh city. Fakir died on 2 May 2016.
