= Nurul Amin Khan Pathan =

Bangladeshi politician

Member of Bangladesh Parliament

Personal details
- Party: Jatiya Party (Ershad)

Nurul Amin Khan Pathan is a Jatiya Party (Ershad) politician and a former member of parliament for Mymensingh-3.

== Career ==
Pathan was elected to parliament from Mymensingh-3 as a Jatiya Party candidate in 1986 and 1988.
