= Gouripur Upazila =

Gouripur গৌরীপুর
- Upazila
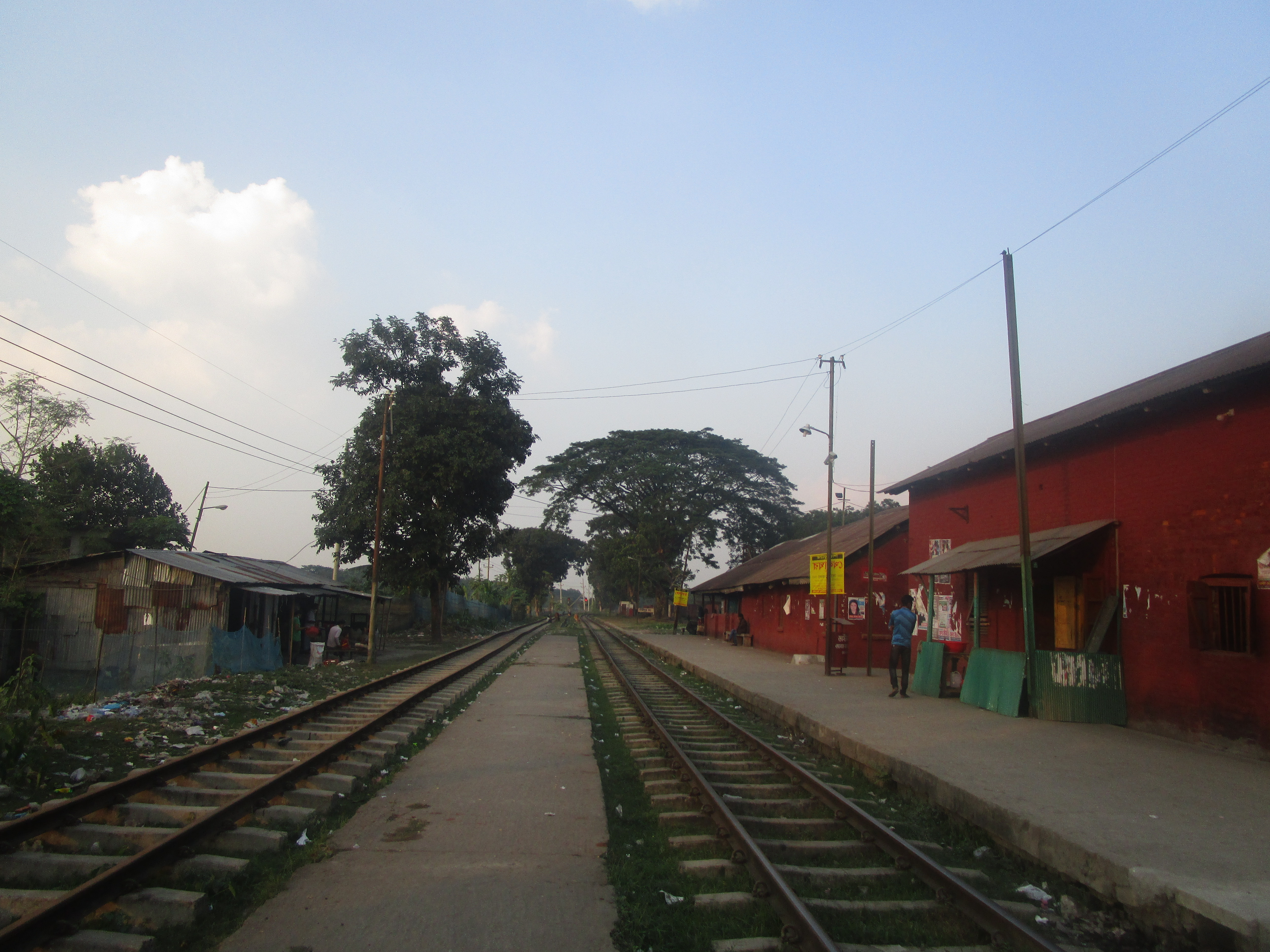
- Gouripur Junction railway station

- Coordinates: 24°45.5′N 90°34.5′E
- Country: Bangladesh
- Division: Mymensingh
- District: Mymensingh
- Headquarters: Gouripur

Area
  - Total: 276.74 km^{2} (106.85 sq mi)

Population (2022)
  - Total: 357,353
  - Density: 1,291.3/km^{2} (3,344.4/sq mi)
- Time zone: UTC+6 (BST)
- Postal code: 2270
- Area code: 09024
- Website: gouripur.mymensingh.gov.bd

Gauripur Upazila mauza geocode map

Gouripur (Bengali: গৌরীপুর; as also spelled as Gowripur) is an upazila located in the Mymensingh District of Bangladesh.

== Demographics ==
According to the 2022 Bangladeshi census, Gouripur Upazila had 85,108 households and a population of 357,353. 10.60% of the population were under 5 years of age. Gouripur had a literacy rate (age 7 and over) of 68.21%: 70.23% for males and 66.33% for females, and a sex ratio of 94.01 males for 100 females. 40,601 (11.36%) lived in urban areas.

== Administration ==
Gouripur Upazila is divided into Gouripur Municipality and ten union parishads: Achintapur, Bhangnamari, Bokainagar, Douhakhola, Gouripur, Mailakanda, Maoha, Ramgopalpur, Sahanati, and Sidhla. The union parishads are subdivided into 245 mauzas and 289 villages.

Gouripur Municipality is subdivided into 9 wards and 34 mahallas.

== Notable people ==
Religions in Gouripur Upazila (2022)
Religion	Percent
Islam	96.20%
Hinduism	3.72%
Other or not stated	0.08%

- Brajendra Kishore Roy Chowdhury, Last acting zaminder of Gouripur
- Birendra Kishore Roy Chowdhury, Pandit music composer, Son of Brajendra Kishore Roy Chowdhury.
- Vilayat Khan, classical sitar player
- Abdul Wahed Bokainagari, politician
- AKMA Muqtadir, Independence Day Awardee ophthalmologist
- Askar Ibne Shaikh Bangla Academy Literary Awardee writer
- Mozibur Rahman Fakir, politician
- AFM Nazmul Huda, politician
- Nurul Amin Khan Pathan, politician
- Jyotika Jyoti, Bangladeshi actress

== See also ==
- Upazilas of Bangladesh
- Districts of Bangladesh
- Divisions of Bangladesh

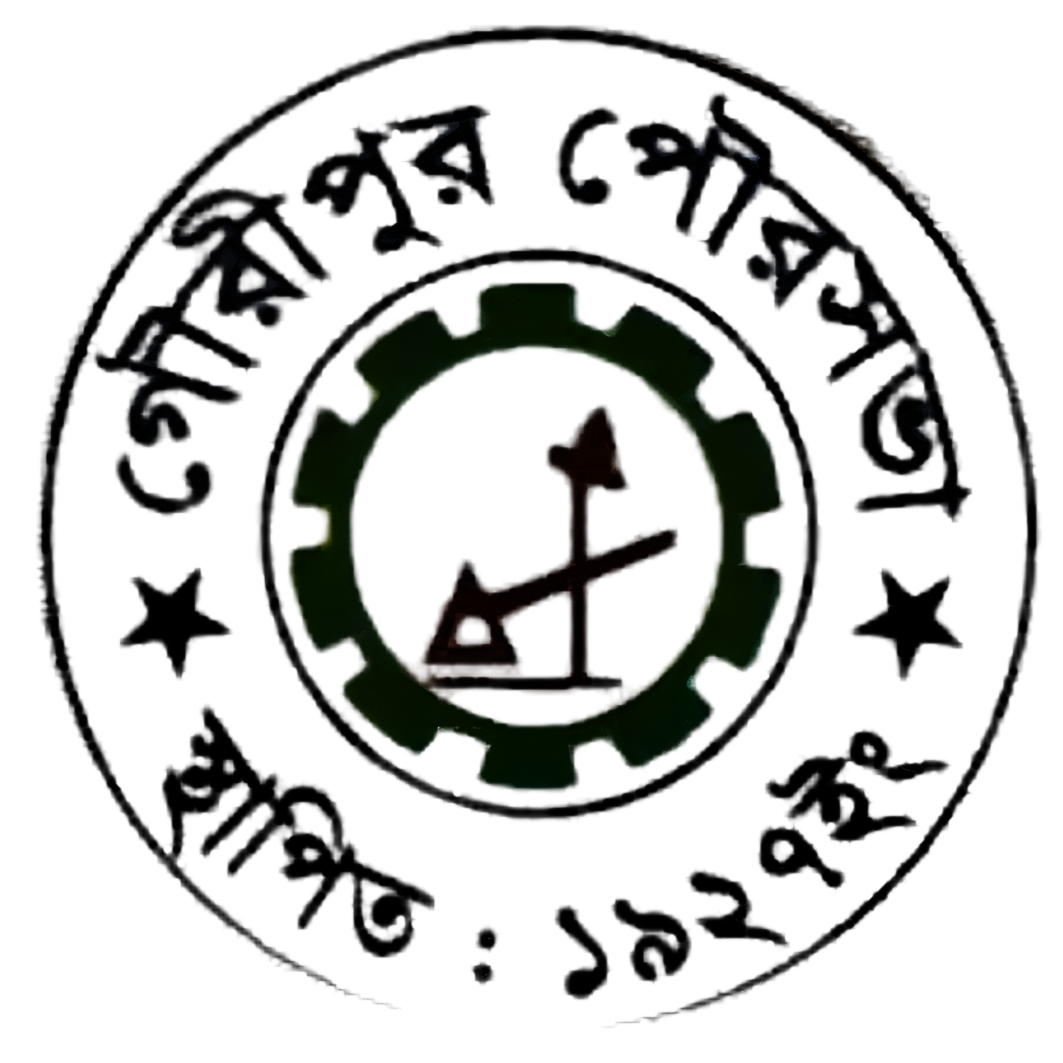
Seal of Gouripur Paurashava office

Historical population
Year	Pop.	±%
1981	166,461	—
1991	247,945	+49.0%
2001	282,940	+14.1%
2011	323,057	+14.2%
2022	357,353	+10.6%
Source: Bangladesh Bureau of Statistics
