= Shah Shahid Sarwar =

Bangladeshi politician

Member of Bangladesh Parliament

Personal details
- Party: Bangladesh Nationalist Party

Shah Shahid Sarwar is a Bangladesh Nationalist Party politician and a former member of parliament for Mymensingh-2.

== Career ==
Sarwar was elected to parliament from Mymensingh-2 as a Bangladesh Nationalist Party candidate in 2001. The Bangladesh Anti-Corruption Commission sued him on 10 November 2008 for concealing information about his wealth.
