= AFM Nazmul Huda =

Bangladeshi politician

Member of Bangladesh Parliament

Personal details
- Died: 31 December 2015
- Party: Bangladesh Nationalist Party

AFM Nazmul Huda was a Bangladesh Nationalist Party politician and member of parliament for Mymensingh-3.

== Career ==
Huda was elected to parliament from Mymensingh-3 as a Bangladesh Nationalist Party candidate in 1979 and 1996. He also served as the President of Mymensingh Bar Association for a number of terms.

== Death ==
Huda died on 31 December 2015.
