= Phulpur Upazila =

Phulpur ফুলপুর
- Upazila
- Fulpur
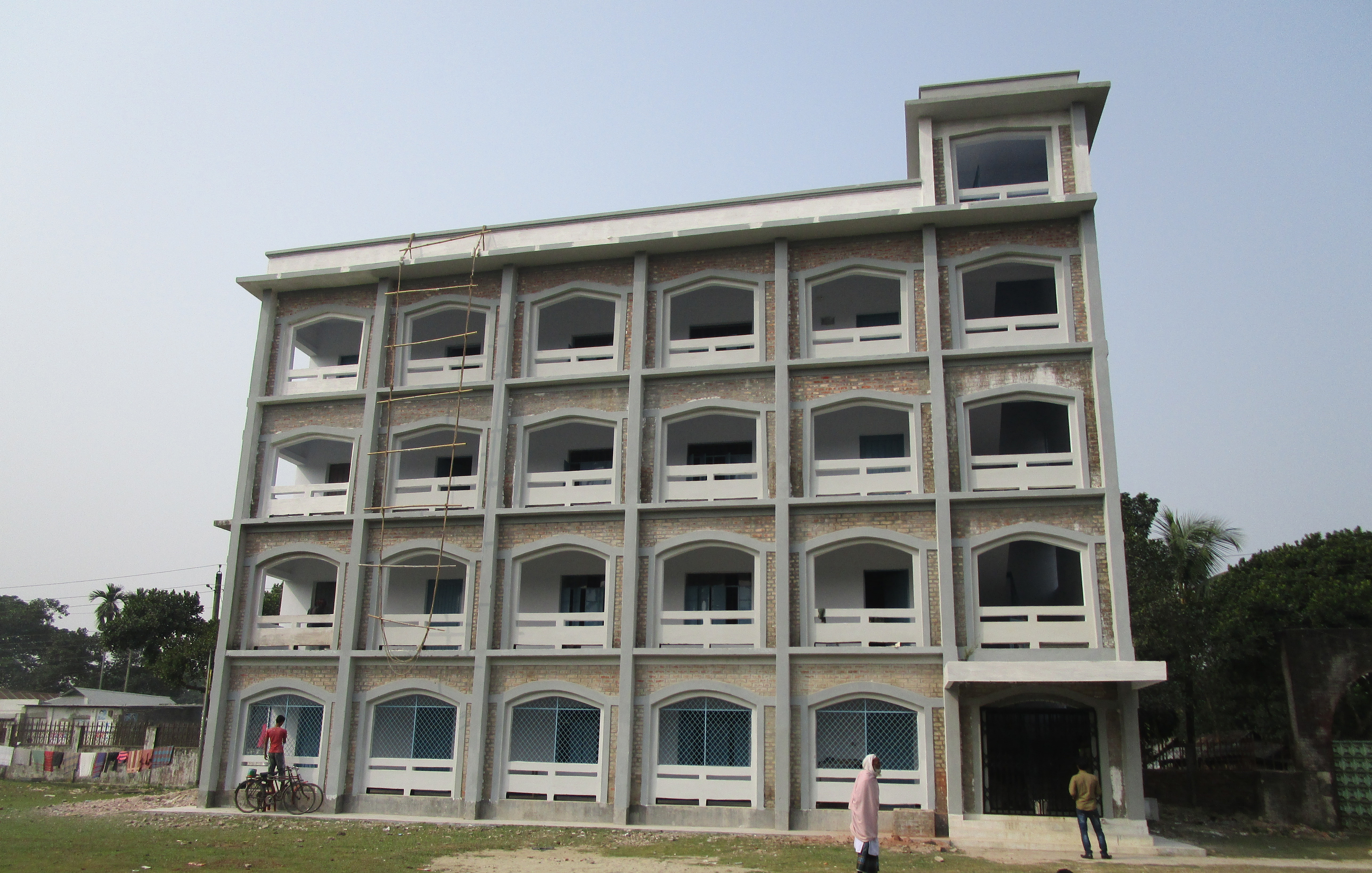
- Phulpur Degree College

- Coordinates: 24.973°N 90.349°E
- Country: Bangladesh
- Division: Mymensingh
- District: Mymensingh
- Headquarters: Phulpur

Area
  - Total: 319.01 km^{2} (123.17 sq mi)

Population (2022)
  - Total: 351,001
  - Density: 1,100.3/km^{2} (2,849.7/sq mi)
- Time zone: UTC+6 (BST)
- Postal code: 2250
- Area code: 09033
- Website: phulpur.mymensingh.gov.bd

Phulpur Upazila mauza geocode map

Phulpur (Bengali: ফুলপুর) is an upazila of Mymensingh District in the Division of Mymensingh, Bangladesh. Phulpur Town serves as the administrative center and main town of Phulpur Upazila.

== Demographics ==
Historical population
Year	Pop.	±%
2011	303,546	—
2022	351,001	+15.6%
Source: Bangladesh Bureau of Statistics

Religions in Phulpur Upazila (2022)
Religion	Percent
Islam	97.40%
Hinduism	2.41%
Other or not stated	0.19%

According to the 2022 Bangladeshi census, Phulpur Upazila had 86,692 households and a population of 351,001. 11.22% of the population were under 5 years of age. Phulpur had a literacy rate (age 7 and over) of 66.66%: 67.41% for males and 65.97% for females, and a sex ratio of 94.89 males for 100 females. 49,664 (14.15%) lived in urban areas.

== Administration ==
Phulpur Upazila is divided into Phulpur Municipality and ten union parishads: Balia, Baola, Payari, Phulpur, Rahimganj, Rambhadrapur, Rupasi, Singheshwar, Chhandhara, and Bhaitkandi.

Phulpur Municipality is subdivided into 9 wards and 12 mahallas.

== See also ==
- Upazilas of Bangladesh
- Districts of Bangladesh
- Divisions of Bangladesh
