= Govt. Laboratory High School, Rajshahi =

Public secondary school in Bangladesh

- গভঃ ল্যাবরেটরী হাই স্কুল, রাজশাহী

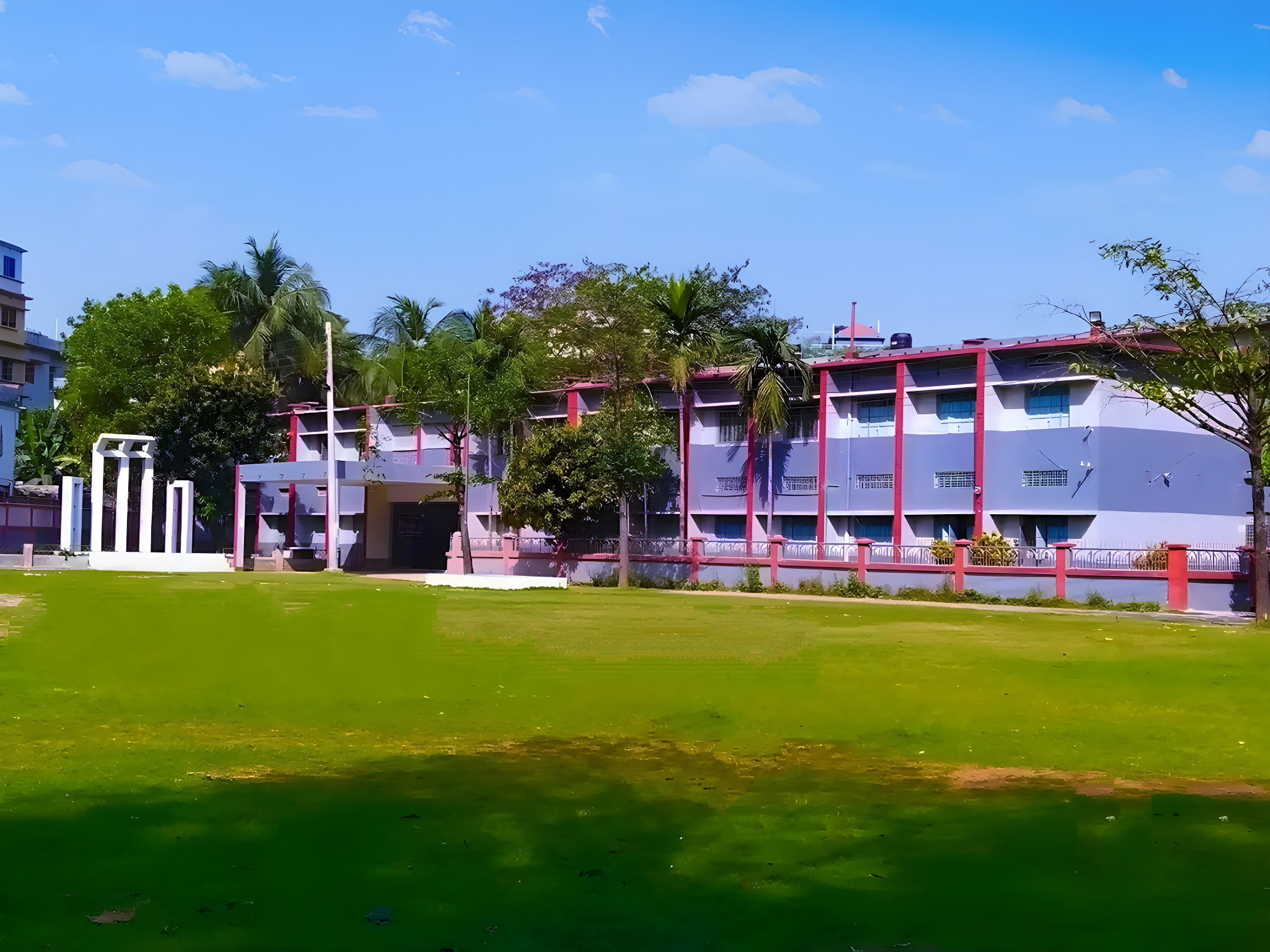
- Campus of Govt. Laboratory High School, Rajshahi

Location
- Ward 8, Laxmipur, Rajpara; Rajshahi, 6000; Bangladesh; 24.3717°N 88.5804°E

Information
- Type: Public Secondary School
- Motto: Enter to Learn; Leave to Serve
- Established: 1969; 57 years ago
- School district: Rajshahi District
- School number: EIIN: 127024
- School code: 1009
- Headmistress: Dr. Shahnaz Begum
- Teaching staff: 27
- Classes: 3rd – 10th Grade
- Gender: Boys
- Enrollment: Almost 900
- Language: Bangla
- Classrooms: 46
- Campus size: 5.99 acres
- Campus type: Urban
- Colours: White; Khaki
- Nickname: RGLHS
- Yearbook: Barshiki
- Affiliations: Rajshahi Education Board
- Alumni name: ORLABS
- Activities Started: 24 January 1969
- Website: www.rglhs.edu.bd
- Last updated: 4 August 2025

Govt. Laboratory High School, Rajshahi (Bengali: গভঃ ল্যাবরেটরী হাই স্কুল, রাজশাহী) is a public secondary school located in Rajshahi, Bangladesh. It was established in 1969. The school is situated in the Laxmipur area of the Rajshahi metropolis. The school is known as one of the best schools in the city.

== History ==
In the early 1960s, the then government of East Pakistan decided to establish 10 boys' and 5 girls' schools (government) on priority basis in the divisional and populous cities of East Pakistan. The decision to establish two boys' and one girls' schools in Rajshahi was finalized. Among the two boys' schools, while Seroil Government High School and Rajshahi Government Girls' High School as a girls' school were established in 1967 and began educational activities, the other boys' school could not be established on time due to land-related complications. At that time, Rajshahi Collegiate School was under the supervision of Government Teachers Training College, Rajshahi for the practical teaching of B.Ed trainees, but the importance and necessity of establishing a school nearby was strongly felt. The other boys' school was selected as the laboratory (examination) of Teachers Training College and started its educational activities in 1969 at its present location in Laxmipur by naming it Govt. Laboratory High School Rajshahi. Under the direct supervision of the Teachers Training College and the efforts of capable and renowned headmasters, the school quickly became known as one of the best schools in the country. Not only good results, the institution also achieved success in co-curricular activities such as sports, literary and cultural activities, debates, drawing, etc.

The school celebrated its 50th founding anniversary (Golden Jubilee) in 2019 (1969–2019). A two-day program was organized on the occasion. The program was held on 20 December at the school premises in Laxmipur and the closing day of the program was on 21 December.

== Infrastructure ==
The campus consists of an H-shaped three-storey academic building, a playground, flower gardens, a three-storey residential hostel, gymnasium, auditorium, and the headmistress's residence. A new three-storey building has been constructed, and a six-storey academic building is under construction.

- Academic buildings: 2 (46 classrooms)
- Hostel: 1 (15 rooms, capacity: 75 students)
- Other buildings: Headmistress’s residence, guards’s quarter, guardian shed
- Students: Approximately 900
- Classes: 3 to 10 (two sections per class: A & B)
- Streams (Grade 9): Science and Business Studies

== Facilities ==
The school provides a library, indoor games room (common room), separate laboratories for physics, chemistry, biology, agricultural studies, computer science, and higher mathematics, an auditorium, scout den, bicycle garage, flower garden, playground, prayer room, and tiffin room. The ICT Learning Center, established under the SESIP program, plays a key role in interactive digital learning.

- Publications: Annual yearbook (Barshiki), wall magazines, memory albums, and irregular periodicals.

== Faculty and Staff ==
- Teaching Staff: 27 (1 headmistress, 1 assistant head teacher, 25 assistant teachers)
- Support Staff: 2 (1 senior clerk, 1 junior clerk/computer operator)
- General Staff: 5 (1 gatekeeper, 1 office assistant, 1 gardener, 1 night guard, 1 sweeper)

== Photo Gallery ==
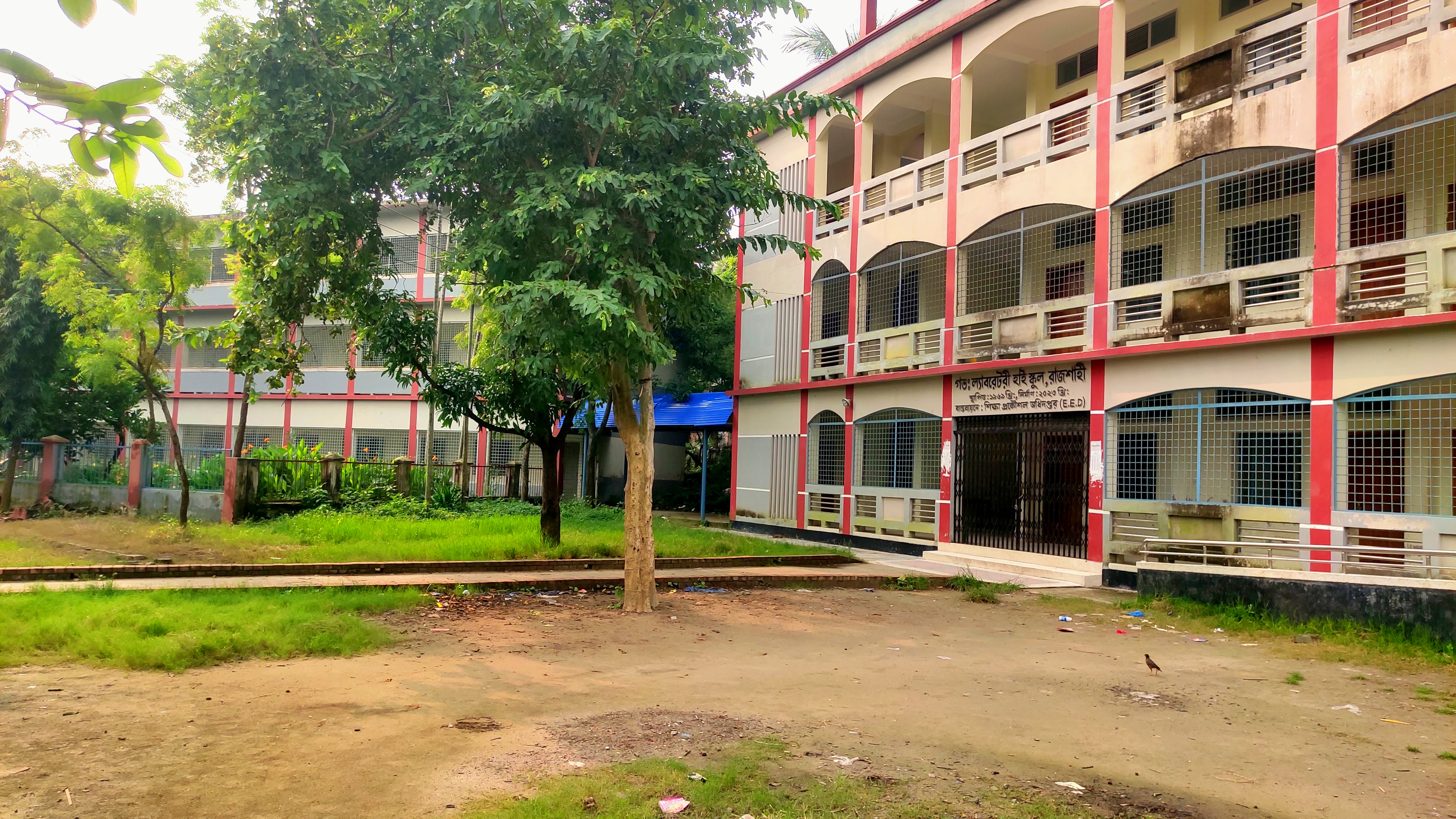
Academic Building - 2

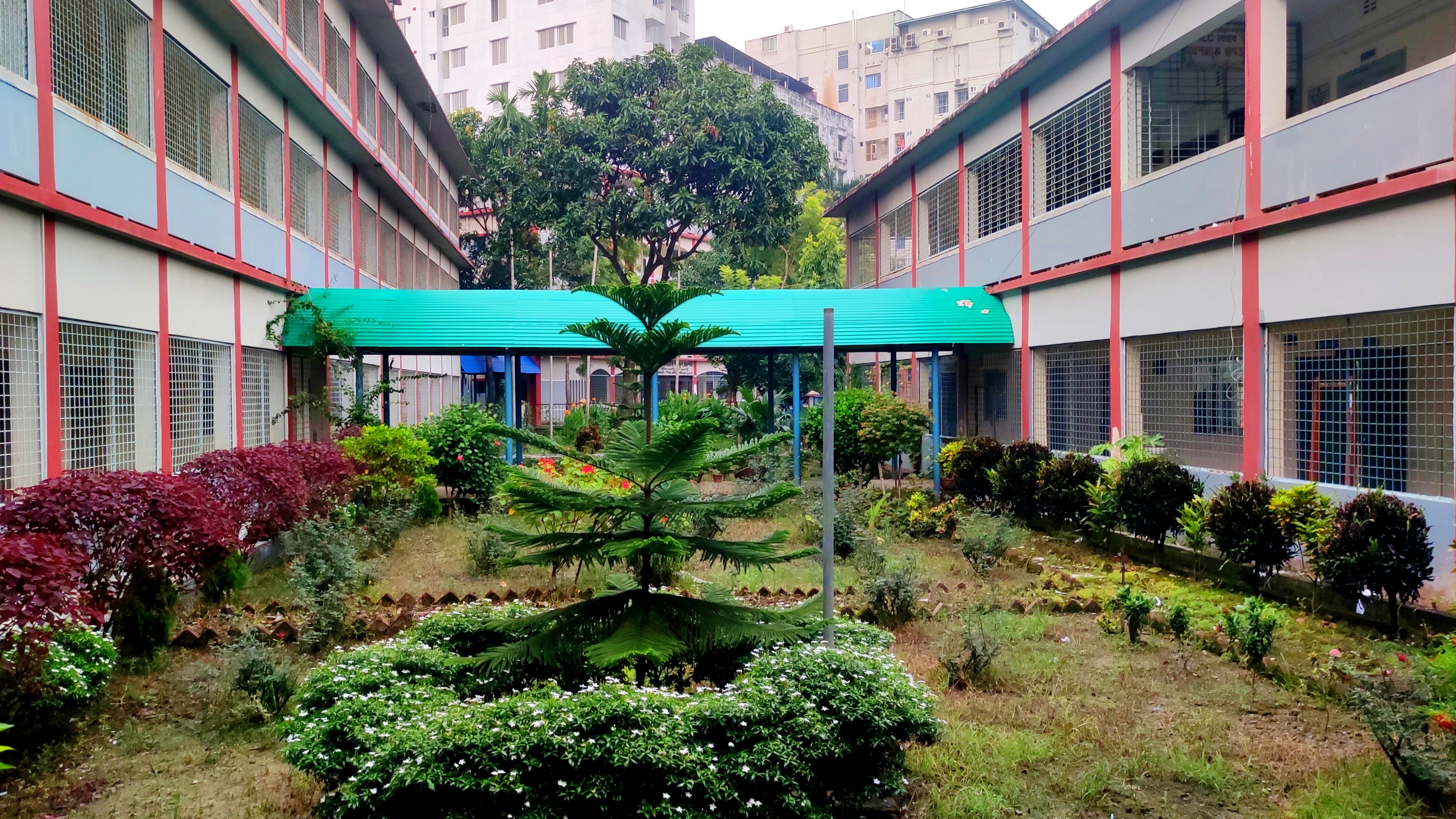
Garden

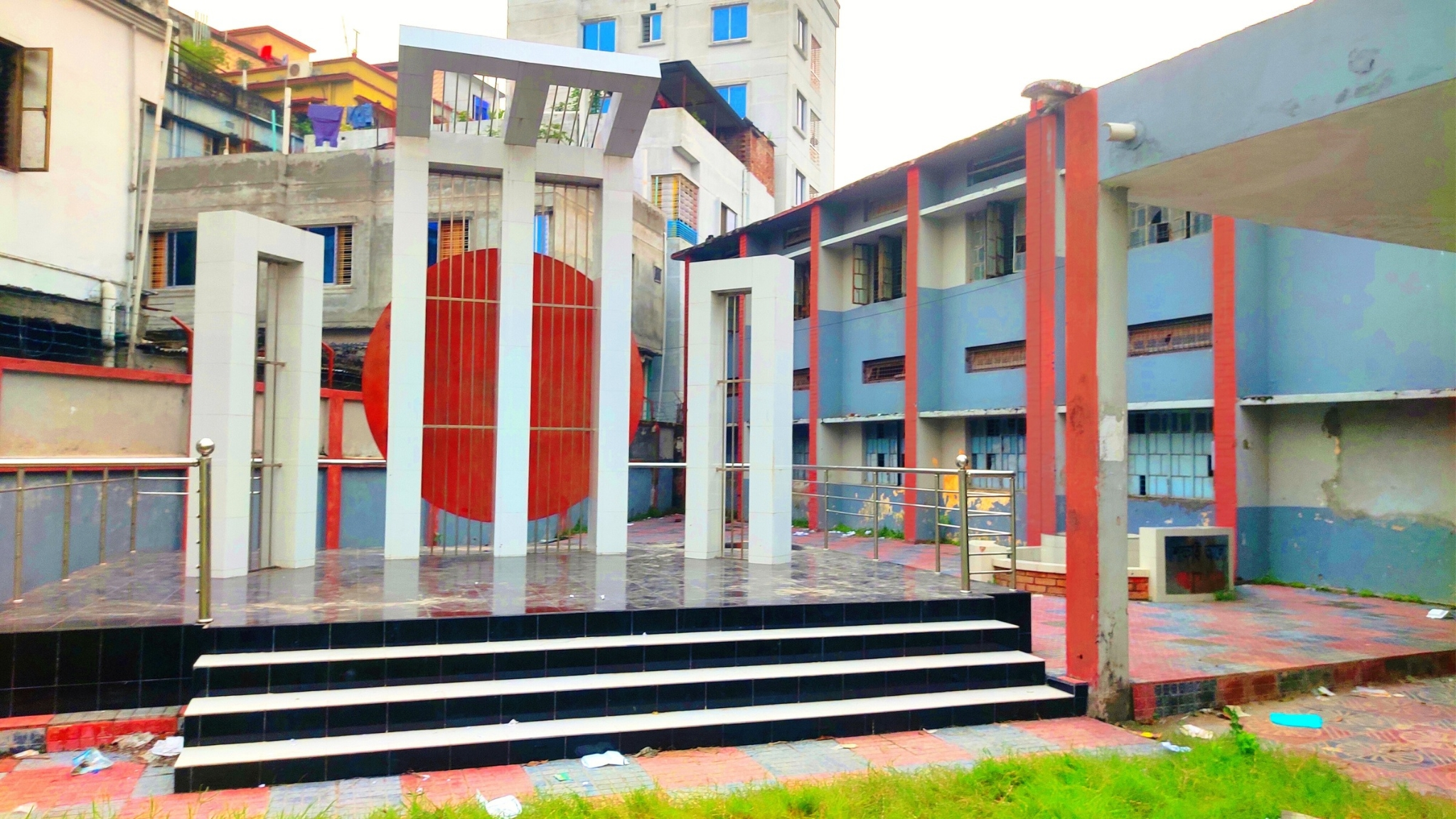
Shaheed Minar of The School

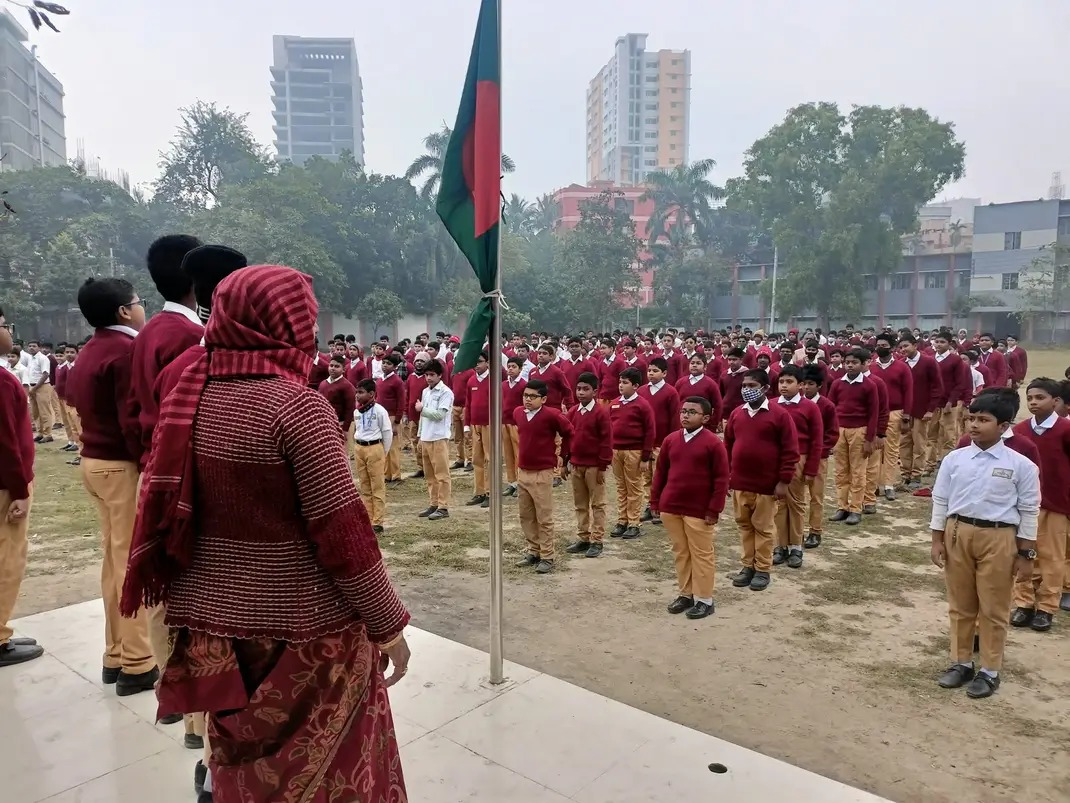
Morning Assembly

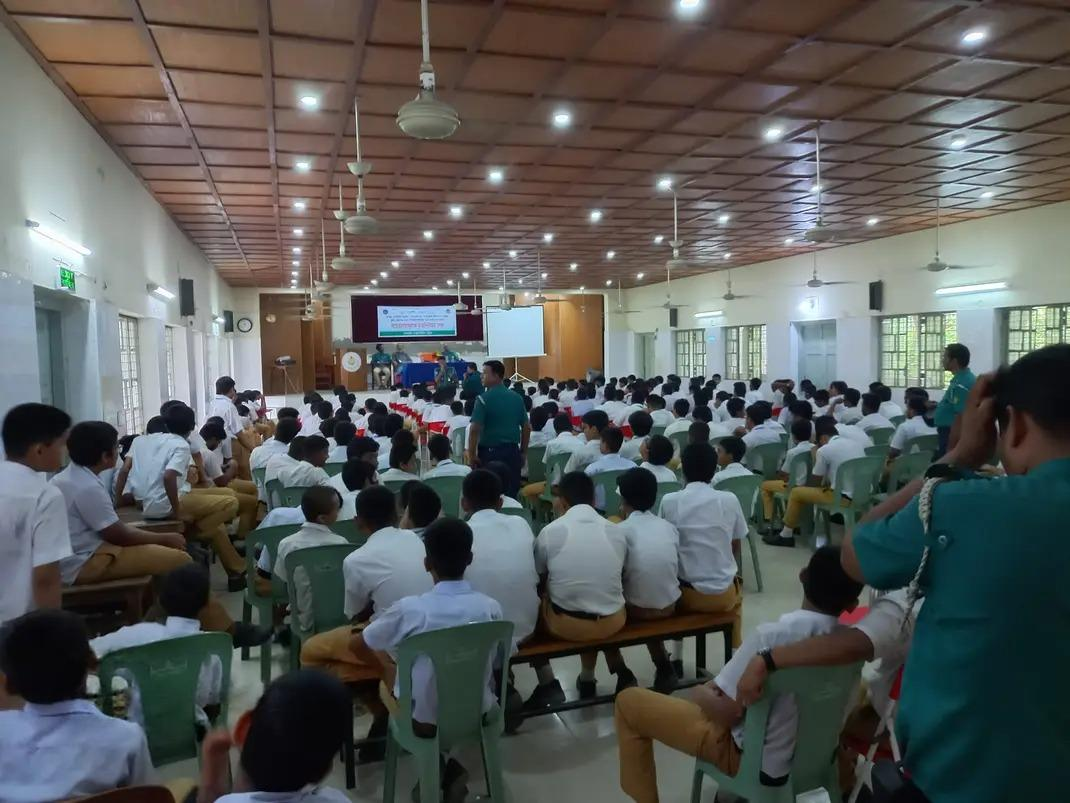
The School's Auditorium

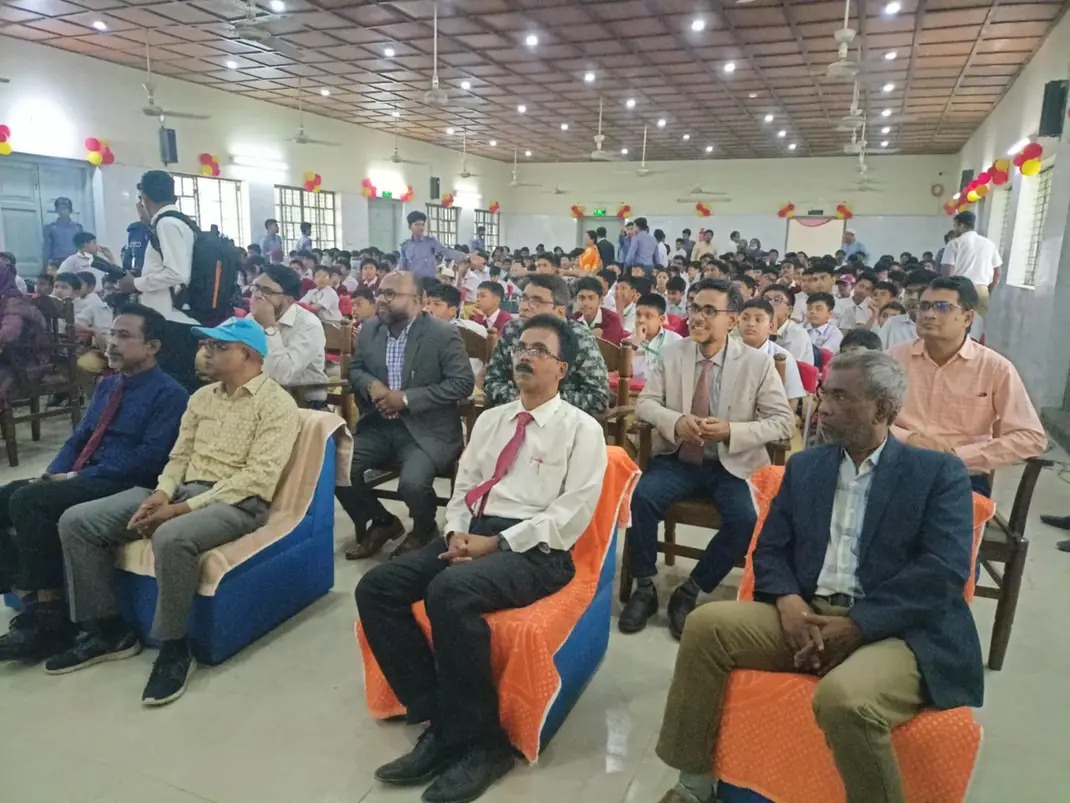
Teachers in the Auditorium

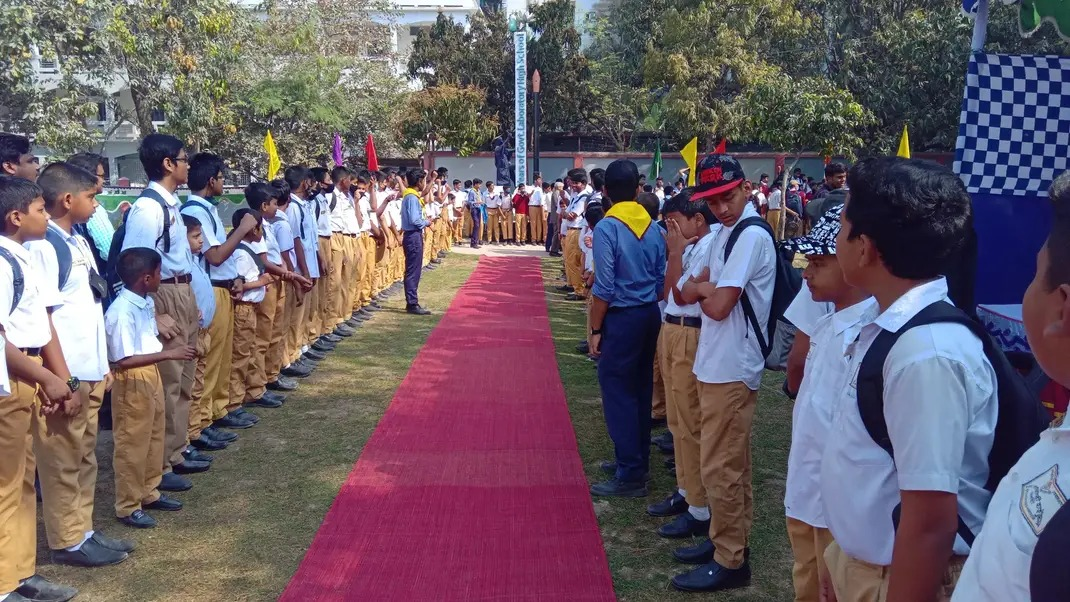
Annual Sports Competition's Opening Ceremony

== List of Headmasters ==
| No. | Head Teacher Name | Term started | Term ended |
|---|---|---|---|
| 1 | Muhammad Izharul Haque | 1969 | 1972 |
| 2 | Moha. Bahadur Ali Sarkar | 1972 | 1977 |
| 3 | Muhammad Alauddin | 1977 | 1980 |
| 4 | Md. Ramzan Ali | 1980 | 1983 |
| 5 | Muhammad Izabul Haque | 1983 | 1991 |
| 6 | Md. Tozammel Haque | 1991 | 1993 |
| 7 | Sheikh Md. Nizam | 1995 | 1996 |
| 8 | Khandaker Mohammad Abdul Aziz | 1996 | 1996 |
| 9 | Md. Abul Kasem | 1997 | 1998 |
| 10 | Md. Ghulam Rabbani | 1998 | 2000 |
| 11 | Dr. Sharmin Ferdous Chowdhury | 2001 | 2002 |
| 12 | Mosa. Amena Khatun | 2002 | 2005 |
| 13 | Md. Mostaq Habib | 2005 | 2009 |
| 13 | Md. Mostaq Habib | 2010 | 2014 |
| 14 | Nurjahan Begum | 2014 | 2014 |
| 15 | Md. Lutfar Rahman | 2014 | 2016 |
| 16 | Nilu Shamsun Nahar | 2016 | 2017 |
| 17 | Moh. Abdur Rashid | 2017 | 2021 |
| 18 | Dr. Shahnaz Begum | 2022 | Present |

== Notable alumni ==
- Golam Shabbir Sattar, 24th Vice Chancellor of University of Rajshahi
- Flight Lieutenant Towkir Islam

The alumni association is known as "ORLABS" (Old Rajshahi Laboratorians' Society). It frequently organizes academic and cultural programs at the school.

== Logo/Symbol Introduction ==
Hand-drawn explanatory design of the logo by Hashem Khan

The school monogram is a symbolic design. It has been designed by the famous painter Hashem Khan.

The main design features four angular structures. The left corner is education, the right corner is culture and the bottom corner is patriotism or service to the country, which holds education and culture as a firm commitment to move upward, i.e. towards progress and light. The open book standing in the center of the quadrangular room is a symbol of knowledge. It is through the practice of knowledge that the human society moves forward towards progress by embracing education, culture and patriotism.

The flower bud just above the book in the design symbolizes teenage children. They will be enlightened by the light of education from the bud and blossom into beautiful and full flowers. That is, he will be established as a complete and ideal person in the society. Govt Laboratory High School, Rajshahi, written in a semi-circle, is arranged with all the designs in such a way that the institution stands on a solid foundation.The color of the symbol – the square house and the bud is crimson which is the color of the national flag, a symbol of youth. The yellow color of the book is the light of knowledge, the color of brightness. The outer and middle lines of the book are blue – the kindness of the sky.
