= Saleh Hasan Naqib =

Bangladeshi academic and current vice-chancellor of University of Rajshahi

- সালেহ হাসান নকীব
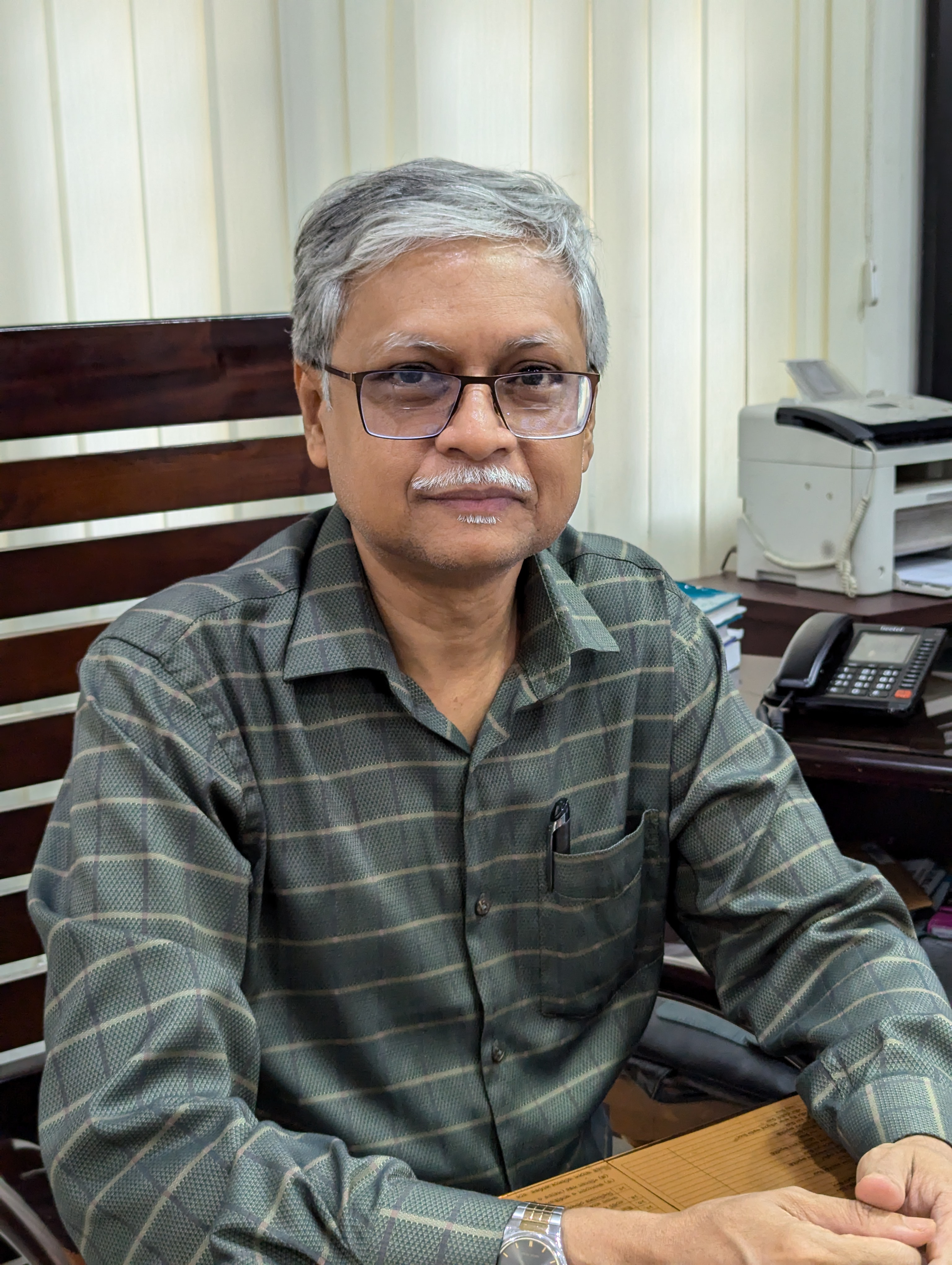
- Professor Naqib in 2024

25th Vice-Chancellor of the University of Rajshahi
- In office 5 September 2024 – 16 March 2026
- Chancellor: President Mirza Fakhrul Islam Alamgir
- Preceded by: Golam Shabbir Sattar
- Succeeded by: Faridul Islam

Personal details
- Born: August 3, 1970 (age 56) Rajshahi, East Pakistan, Pakistan
- Spouse: Raihana Shams Islam
- Education: University of Cambridge (Ph.D); University of Rajshahi (M.Sc) (B.Sc)
- Occupation: Academic, researcher

Saleh Hasan Naqib is a Bangladeshi professor and researcher. He served as the 25th Vice-Chancellor of the University of Rajshahi.

== Early life and education ==
Naqib was born on August 3, 1970 in Rajshahi, Bangladesh. He completed his secondary education in 1987 from Rajshahi University School and higher secondary education in 1989 from Rajshahi College. He pursued his Bachelor of Science (B.Sc.) and Master of Science (M.Sc.) degrees in physics at the Rajshahi University. He later earned his Ph.D. in cuprate superconductivity from the University of Cambridge in the United Kingdom, where he studied as a Commonwealth Scholar.

== Career ==
Naqib joined the University of Rajshahi as a lecturer in the Department of Physics in 1998, currently serving as professor of the department. His main research interests are superconductivity and computational physics.

Naqib is a member of the Institute of Physics, American Physical Society, Cambridge Philosophical Society, Cambridge Commonwealth Trust, Bangladesh Physical Society, Asian Council of Science Editors, Advisory Board and Section Editor of the Journal of Scientific Research and Editorial Board of the Journal of Bangladesh Academy of Sciences. He is a Fellow of the Bangladesh Academy of Science (BAS). He was a member of the pro-Bangladesh Nationalist Party teacher's forum.
