= Golam Shabbir Sattar =

Bangladeshi academic and current vice-chancellor of University of Rajshahi

- গোলাম সাব্বির সাত্তার
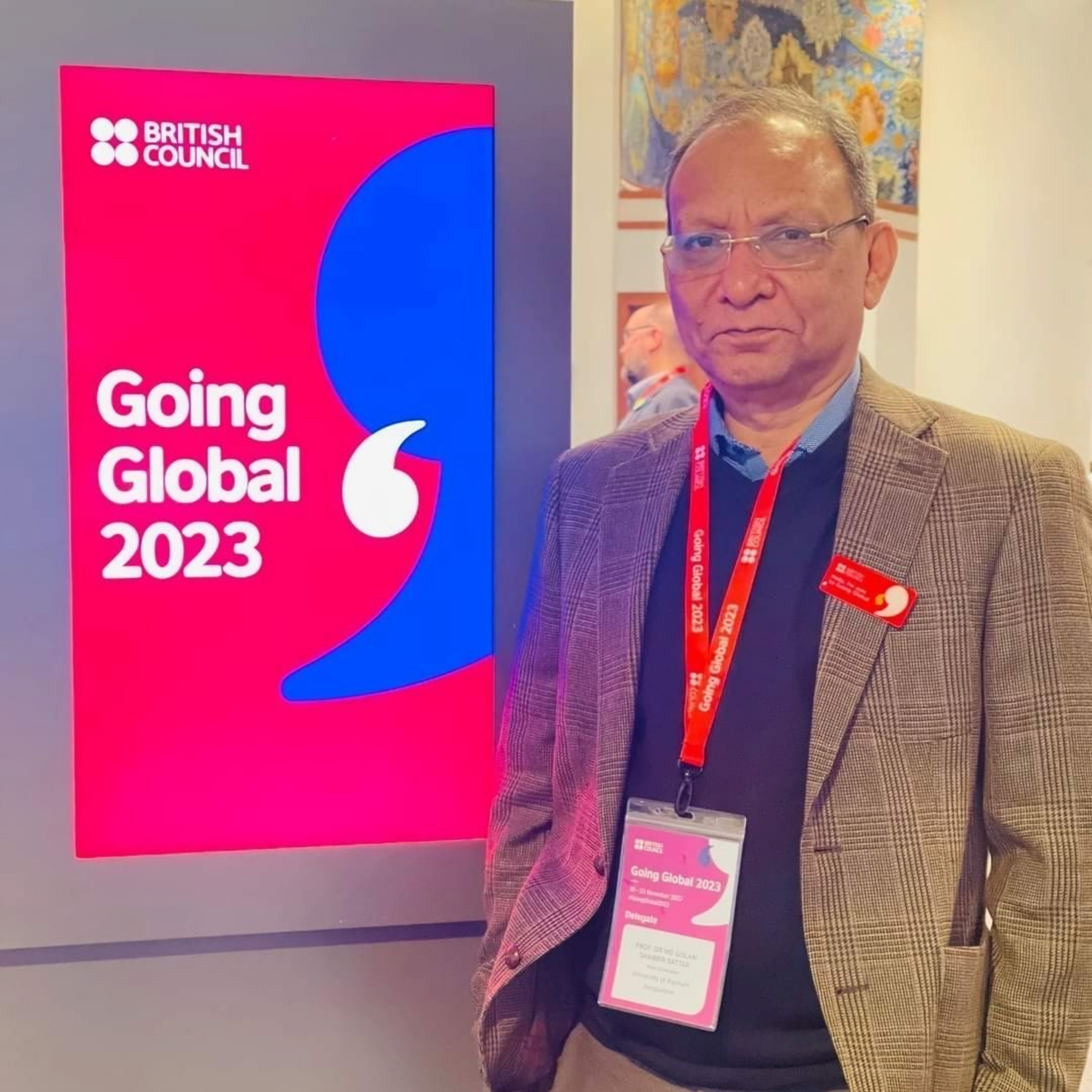
- Sattar in 2023
- Born: 31 December 1962 (age 63)
- Education: University of Rajshahi (Ph.D.)
- Occupation: Professor
- Spouse: Professor Tanzima Yeasmin
- Children: 1
- Father: Late Golam Sattar

24th Vice-Chancellor of the University of Rajshahi
- In office 29 August 2021 – 8 August 2024
- Preceded by: M Abdus Sobhan
- Succeeded by: Saleh Hasan Naqib

Golam Shabbir Sattar (born 1962) is a Bangladeshi academic. He is a former vice-chancellor of the University of Rajshahi served during 2021–2024.

== Early life and education ==
Golam Shabbir Sattar was born on 31 December 1962 to Sufia Khatun and Golam Sattar.

Golam Sabbir Sattar passed SSC Examination from the Govt. Laboratory High School, Rajshahi in 1978. In 1984, Sattar graduated from the University of Rajshahi with a B.Sc. degree. He completed an M.Sc. there the following year. He earned an M.Phil. in 1996 from the University of Newcastle upon Tyne. He received a Ph.D. in 2005 from the University of Rajshahi for his dissertation Combined analysis of geoelectrical and hydrogeological data for the evaluation of groundwater potentiality in Chapai-Nawabganj area of Bangladesh.

== Career ==
Sattar was the chair of the Department of Geology & Mining at the University of Rajshani from 2013 to 2016. He was also the student adviser of the university from 2009 to 2012. He is the director of the Institute of Environmental Science.

== Works ==
His three most cited papers are:

- Kafy, Abdulla - Al; Naim, Md. Nazmul Huda; Subramanyam, Gangaraju; Faisal, Abdullah-Al-; Ahmed, Nessar Uddin; Rakib, Abdullah Al; Kona, Marium Akter; Sattar, Golam Sabbir (August 2021). "Cellular Automata approach in dynamic modelling of land cover changes using RapidEye images in Dhaka, Bangladesh". Environmental Challenges. 4 100084. Bibcode:2021EnvCh...400084K. doi:10.1016/j.envc.2021.100084.
- Sattar, Golam Shabbir; Keramat, Mumnunul; Shahid, Shamsuddin (March 2016). "Deciphering transmissivity and hydraulic conductivity of the aquifer by vertical electrical sounding (VES) experiments in Northwest Bangladesh". Applied Water Science. 6 (1): 35–45. Bibcode:2016ApWS....6...35S. doi:10.1007/s13201-014-0203-9.
- Khan, H. R.; Rahman, K.; Abdur Rouf, A. J. M.; Sattar, G. S.; et al. (September 2007). "Assessment of degradation of agricultural soils arising from brick burning in selected soil profiles". International Journal of Environmental Science & Technology. 4 (4): 471–480. Bibcode:2007JEST....4..471K. doi:10.1007/BF03325983. hdl:1807/62525.
