= M Abdus Sobhan =

Professor

- এম আবদুস সোবহান

23rd Vice-Chancellor of the University of Rajshahi
- In office 20 March 2017 – 28 August 2021
- Preceded by: Muhammad Mizanuddin
- Succeeded by: Professor Dr. Golam Shabbir Sattar
- In office 26 February 2009 – 25 February 2013
- Preceded by: Mumnunul Keramat (acting)

Personal details
- Born: 1953 (age 72–73) Natore District, East Bengal, Dominion of Pakistan
- Occupation: Professor

M Abdus Sobhan (born 1953) is a former vice chancellor of Rajshahi University, and a professor in the university's Applied Physics and Electronic Engineering Department.

== Early life ==
Sobhan was born in 1953 in Natore District.

== Career ==
Sobhan was first appointed vice chancellor in February 2009. After the term of his successor, Muhammad Mizanuddin, Sobhan was appointed to a second four-year term in May 2017. The Daily Star in a 2010 report stated that Sobhan had good relations with Bangladesh Jamaat-e-Islami and supported their student organization on campus.

On 25 October 2020, Sobhan denied he corruption and nepotism charges against him at a press conference. There were allegations of irregularities over the recruitment of his son-in-law and daughter in the University of Rajshahi. The press conference followed a letter, signed by over 60 university teachers, that brought allegations against him.

Sobhan recruited 137 teachers and staff in his last day of office in May 2021 despite the Ministry of Education placing an embargo on recruitment. The confusion over the recruitment led to clashes between Rajshahi City and Rajshahi University units of Bangladesh Chhatra League on campus.
