= Faridul Islam =

Bangladeshi academic and current vice-chancellor of University of Rajshahi

- ফরিদুল ইসলাম

26th Vice-Chancellor of the University of Rajshahi
- Incumbent
- Assumed office 17 March 2026
- Chancellor: President Mirza Fakhrul Islam Alamgir
- Preceded by: Saleh Hasan Naqib

Personal details
- Born: June 7, 1968 (age 58) Rajshahi
- Education: Curtin University (Ph.D); Gutenberg University (M.Sc); University of Rajshahi (B.Com), (MBS)
- Occupation: Academic; University Administrator
- Nickname: Pintu

Faridul Islam is a Bangladeshi academic. He is serving as the 26th vice-chancellor of University of Rajshahi. He was appointed as vice-chancellor on 16 March 2026 after the term of Saleh Hasan Naqib ended.

== Education ==
Islam passed his SSC in 1984 from Maskatadighi High School and HSC in 1986 from New Government Degree College. Later, he completed his bachelor's degree in 1989 and master's degree in 1990 from the Department of Marketing at University of Rajshahi. In 2006, he earned a master's degree from University of Gothenburg in Sweden. In 2013, he obtained a PhD degree from Curtin University in Australia.

== Career ==
Islam joined the Department of Marketing at the university as a lecturer in 1996. He was promoted to assistant professor in 1999, associate professor in 2006, and professor in 2013. From 2014 to 2015, he served as a lecturer in the Department of Marketing and Management at the Sarawak Campus in Malaysia of Curtin University(formerly Curtin University of Technology). In addition, he worked for two years as a probationary officer at AB Bank.

Islam is the general secretary of the Zia Parishad at the University of Rajshahi.

On 17 March 2026, he assumed office as the 26th Vice-Chancellor of University of Rajshahi.
