= Muhammad Mizanuddin =

Bangladeshi academic (born 1953)

- মুহাম্মাদ মিজানউদ্দিন
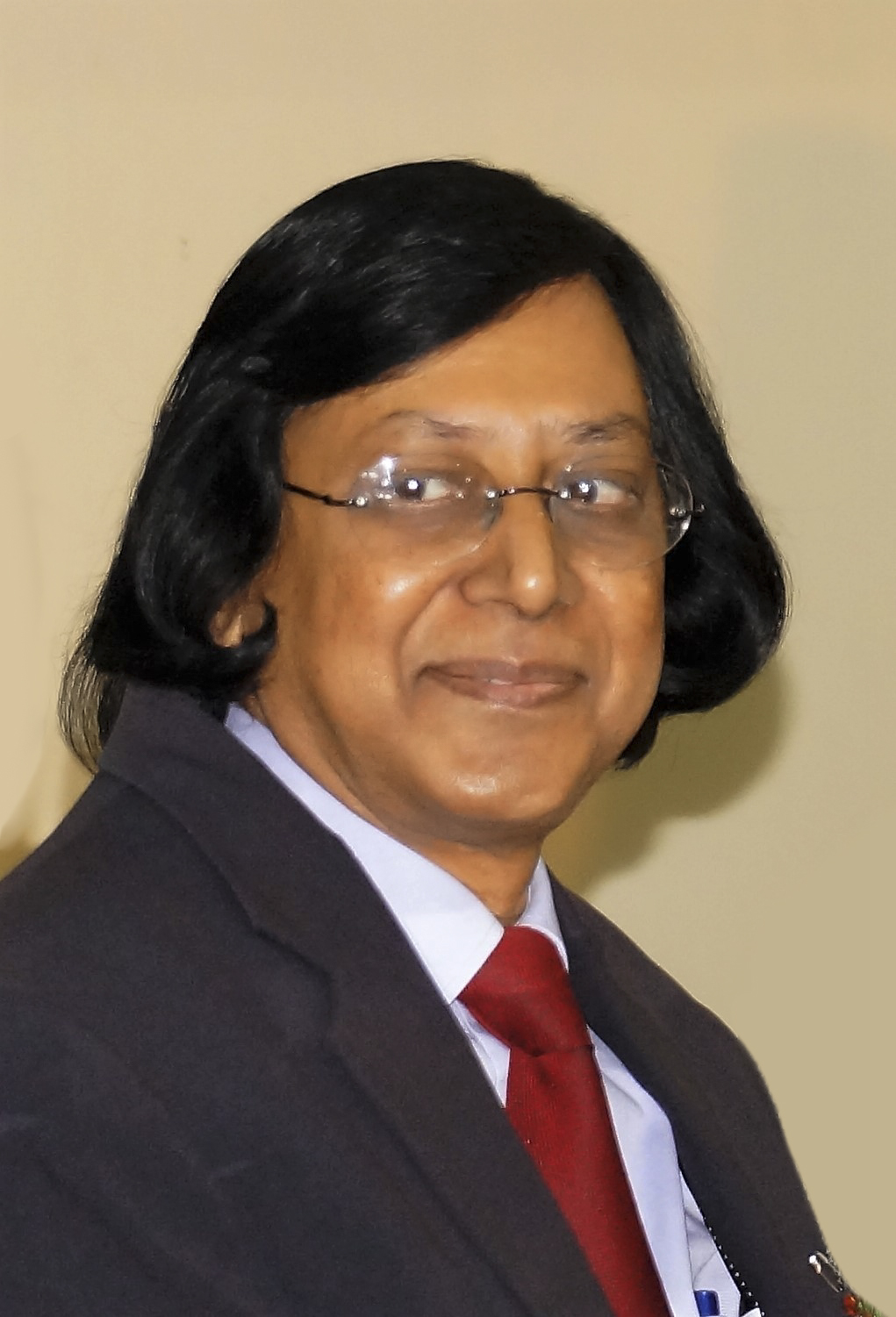
- Mizanuddin in 2012

22nd Vice-Chancellor of the University of Rajshahi
- In office 20 March 2013 – 19 March 2017
- Preceded by: M Abdus Sobhan
- Succeeded by: M Abdus Sobhan

Personal details
- Born: September 26, 1953 (age 73) Chapai Nawabganj District, Rajshahi Division
- Education: University of Rajshahi; University of Alberta; Jawaharlal Nehru University
- Occupation: Academic

Muhammad Mizanuddin (born 26 September 1953) is a Bangladeshi academic. He served as the 22nd Vice-chancellor of Rajshahi University since March 20, 2013.

== Early life and family ==
Mizanuddin was born on 26 September 1953 to a Bengali Muslim family in the village of Airamari in Vinodpur, Shibganj, Nawabganj subdivision, Rajshahi district, East Bengal. He was the son of Muhammad Raisuddin Master and Begum Mujiba.

== Education and career ==
Professor Mizanuddin passed matriculation exam in 1969 and intermediate exam in 1972. He completed his bachelor's and master's from University of Rajshahi in 1976 and 1978 respectively. He earned another master's from University of Alberta in 1983. In 1993, he obtained his Ph.D. from Jawaharlal Nehru University, Delhi in 1993.
