= University of Rajshahi =

Second oldest university in Bangladesh

- রাজশাহী বিশ্ববিদ্যালয়
- Emblem of the University of Rajshahi
- Type: Public Research University
- Established: 6 July 1953; 73 years ago
- Accreditation: UGC; PCB
- Budget: ৳543.58 crore (US$44 million) (2026-27)
- Chancellor: President Mirza Fakhrul Islam Alamgir
- Vice-Chancellor: Faridul Islam
- Pro Vice-Chancellor: Md. Abdul Alim (Administration); Mamunur Rashid (Academic)
- Academic staff: 1,200+
- Administrative staff: 1,614
- Students: 25,000+
- Undergraduates: 18,000+
- Postgraduates: 6,000+
- Doctoral students: 1,000+
- Location: Motihar, Rajshahi, 6205, Bangladesh; 24.370°N 88.637°E
- Campus: 753 acres (305 ha); Urban
- Language: English, Bangla
- Colors: Navy Blue, White and Red
- Website: www.ru.ac.bd

University rankings

Global – Overall
- QS World: 1401+ (2027)
- THE World: 1001-1200 (2026)
- USNWR Global: 612 (2026-27)
- URAP World: 1319 (2025-26)

Global – Liberal arts
- THE Social Sciences: 1001+ (2026)

Global – Life sciences and medicine
- THE Life Sciences: 801-1000 (2026)

Global – Science and engineering
- THE Computer Science: 801-1000 (2025)
- THE Engineering: 601-800 (2026)
- THE Physical Sciences: 801-1000 (2026)

Regional – Overall
- QS Asia: 312 (2026)
- THE Asia: 501-600 (2026)

The University of Rajshahi (Bengali: রাজশাহী বিশ্ববিদ্যালয়), also known as Rajshahi University (RU), is a public research university located in Rajshahi, Bangladesh. It is the second oldest and third largest university in Bangladesh. The university's 59 departments are organized into 12 faculties. It is one of the five autonomous university by the act (1973) of Bangladesh.

== History ==
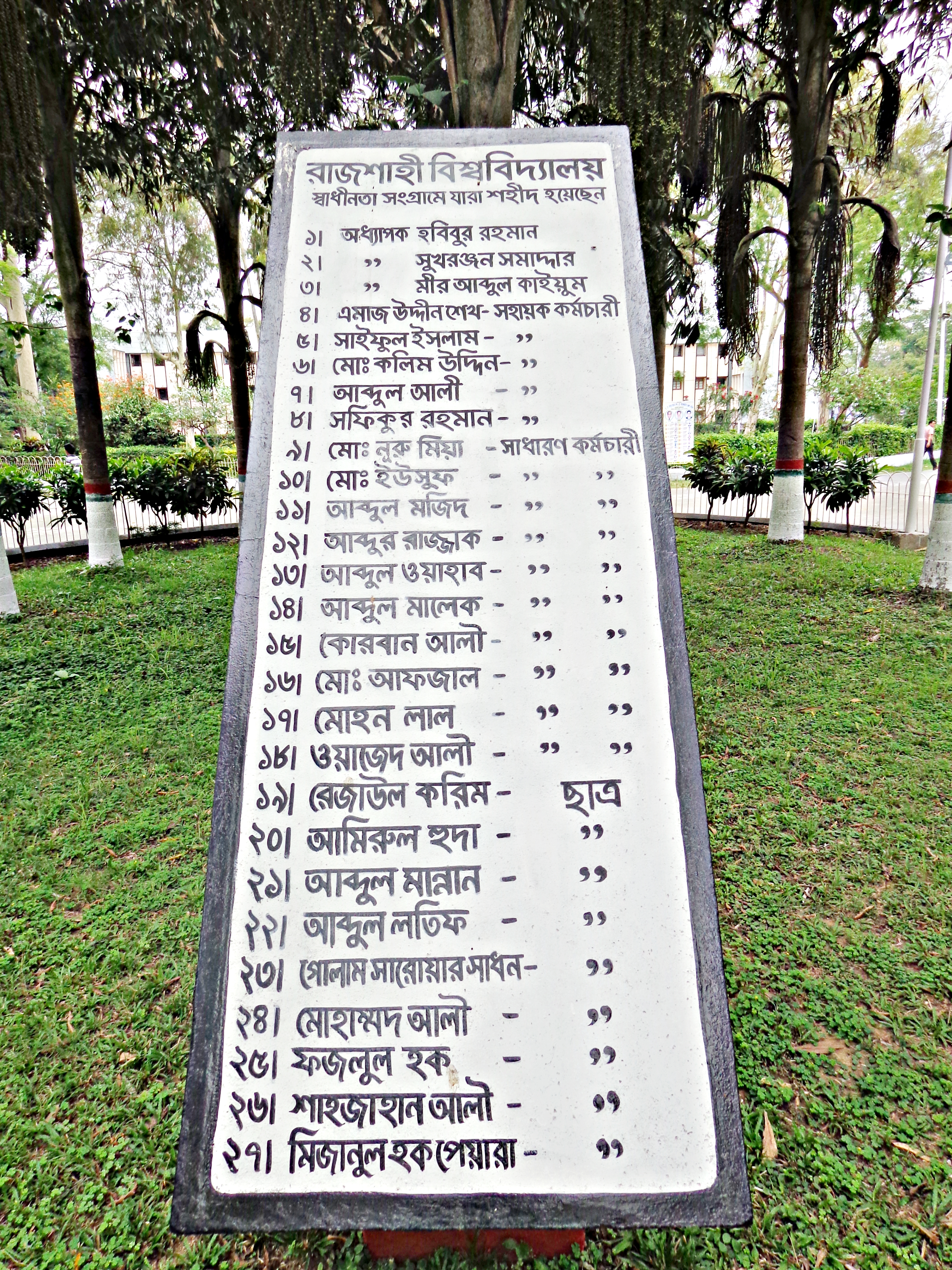
The description on the memorial says, "University of Rajshahi: Those who were martyred during the Liberation war".

The first proposal to establish a university came in 1917, when Calcutta University created the Sadler Commission to assess the university system in Bengal. However, the recommendations of the report had no immediate consequences.

The University of Dhaka was established in 1921. Demand for a university in the northern part of East Bengal gained momentum when two universities were set up quickly in West Pakistan, using funding diverted from East Bengal, without the establishment of any in the east. Students of Rajshahi College were at the forefront of the movement demanding a new university. Finally, Rajshahi was selected as the home for the second university in East Bengal, and the Rajshahi University Act of 1953 (East Bengal Act XV of 1953) was passed by the East Pakistan Provincial Assembly on 31 March 1953. Itrat Hossain Zuberi, the principal of Rajshahi College, was appointed its first vice-chancellor.

Initially, the university was housed in temporary locations, such as the local Circuit House and Boro Kuthi, an 18th-century Dutch establishment. B B Hindu Academy, a local school, housed the library, teachers' lounge, and the medical centre. The university started out with 20 professors, 161 students (of whom 5 were females) and six departments — Bengali, English, history, law, philosophy and economics. In 1964, the offices moved to the permanent campus.

The 1960s were a turbulent period in East Pakistan, when demands for East Pakistani autonomy became stronger. The students and staff of the university started playing an increasing role in politics. On 18 February 1969, Shamsuzzoha, a professor, was killed by the police when he tried to prevent them from shooting at student demonstrators. This date is now commemorated as Zoha Day. During the Bangladesh Liberation War of 1971, the campus was used as a base by the Pakistan Army. A number of professors, students and officers of the university were killed by the Pakistan Army.

After independence, a new Act regarding the administration of the university came into being — the Rajshahi University Act, 1973. The post-independence years saw the university grow steadily in student enrolment and the size of the academic staff. However, the 1980s were turbulent for the university, as the students agitated with other institutions of the country against the military rule of Hossain Muhammad Ershad. Since the early 1990s, the university has seen relative calm and a lowering of session backlogs, though active student politics remains a contentious issue.

== Emblem ==
The circle of the emblem represents the world. An open book is shown in red and gold: red represents one of the colors of the national flag and gold the value of education. The body of the book is blue, the colour of the sky, and at the centre is a shapla flower (Nymphaeaceae), the national flower of Bangladesh.

== Campus ==
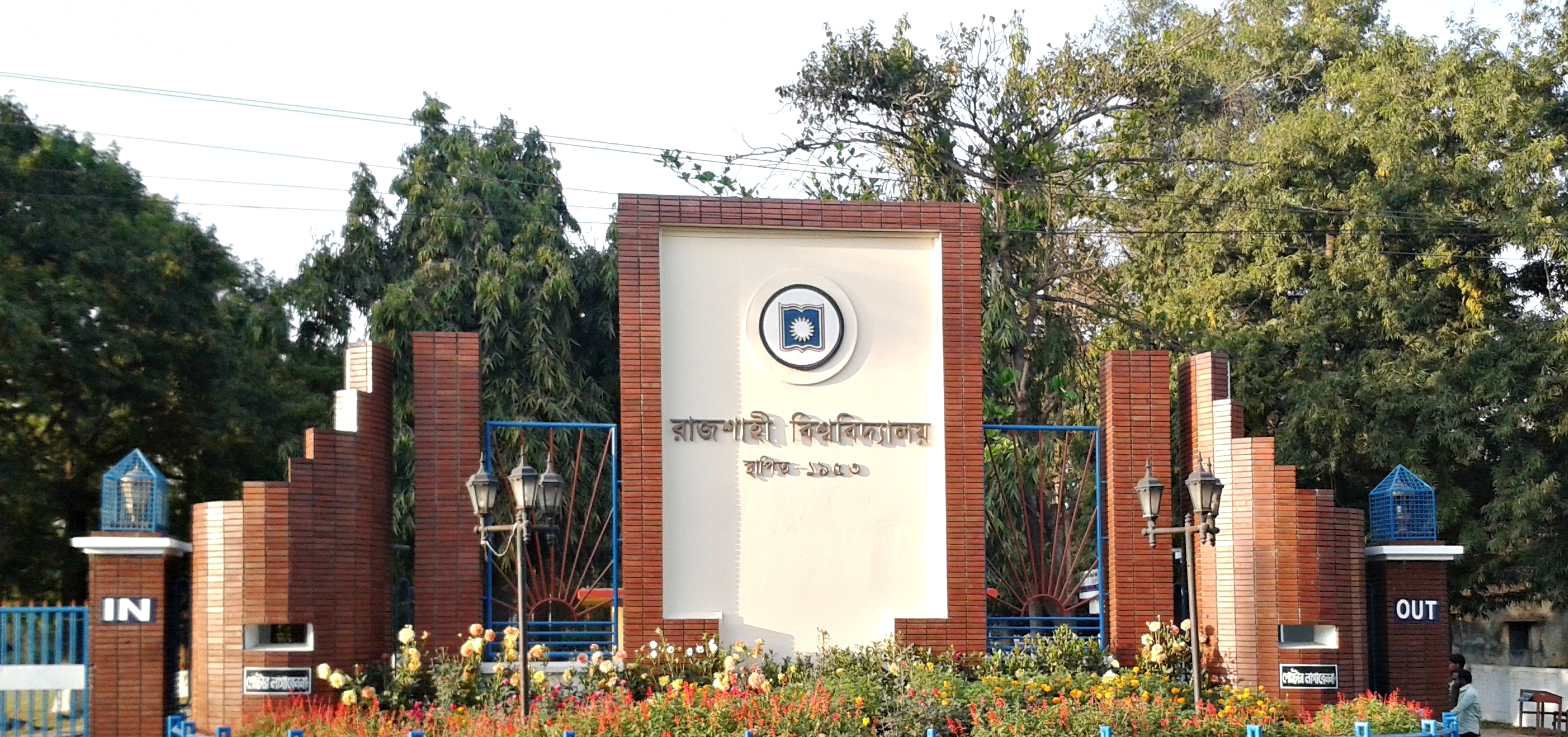
Main entrance of Rajshahi University

The university's main campus is in Motihar, on the eastern side of the city of Rajshahi and a mile from the Bangladeshi coast of the river Padma. The campus area is nearly 305 ha (753 acres). Access to the walled-off campus is controlled through three security gates. It houses eleven large academic buildings — five for the arts, business studies and social sciences, four for the natural and applied sciences, and two for agricultural studies. RU is considered to have one of the most beautiful campus in Bangladesh.

=== Rail line and University Station ===
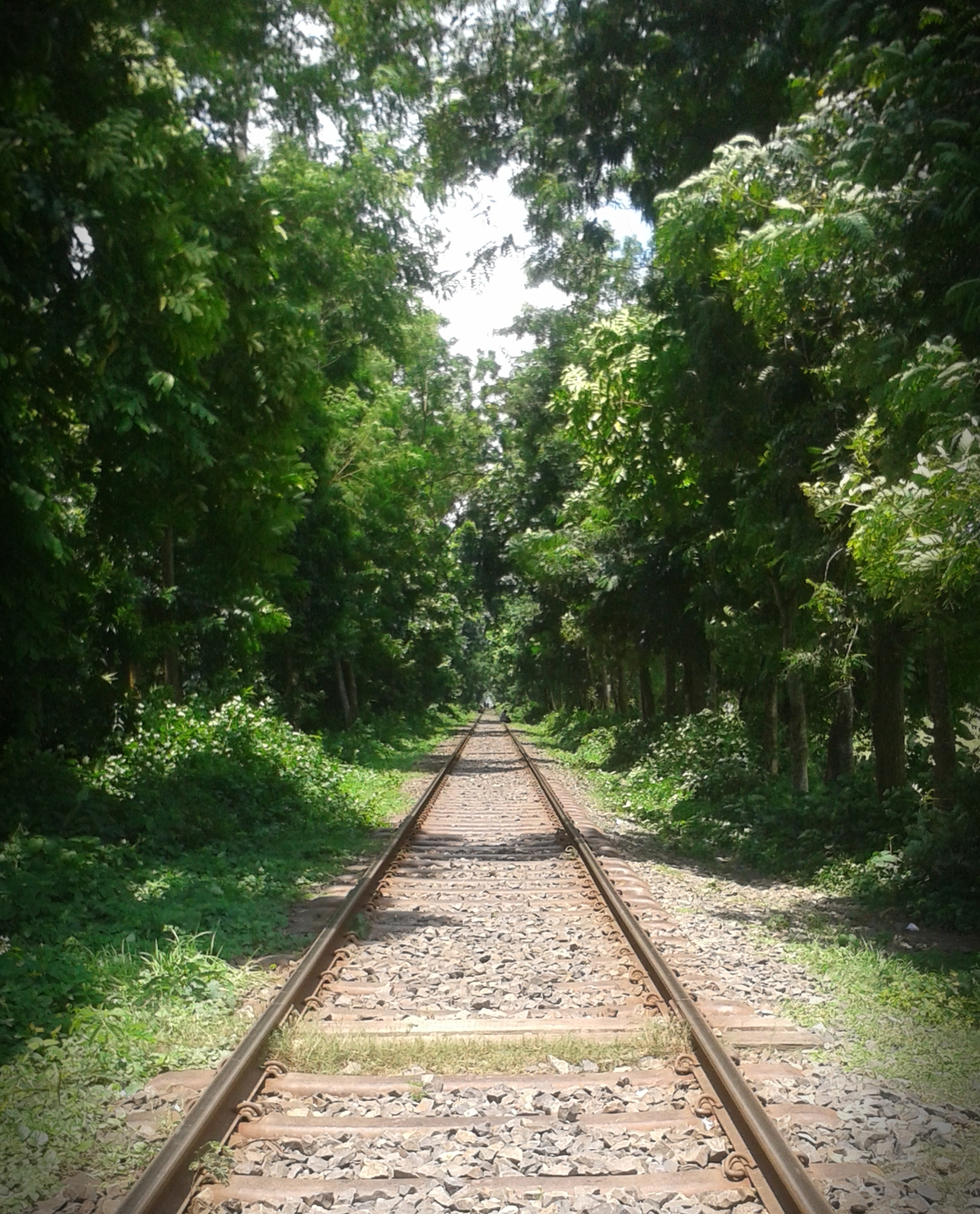
Railline inside of Rajshahi University

The Dhaka-Rajshahi rail line passes through the campus, and it has a dedicated station named the University Station. It is near the Shaheed Shohrawardy Hall on the southern border of the campus. There is an internal bazaar nearby for the students only, called the station bazaar.

=== Gates ===
There are six gates of the university, three being upon the Dhaka - Rajshahi Highway. The westernmost gate is the Kazla gate, which provides access to the western part of the campus mainly playgrounds and residential areas. The easternmost gate is the Binodpur gate, which provides access to the eastern part of the campus, and the Main gate in between these two provides access to the main administrative and academic portion of the campus. The fourth gate is on the other side of the campus and provides access to the campus from the other side of the city. The main gate is used to create an architectural optical illusion while entering or exiting the campus through it, as it seemed to the visitor that the more he tries to go nearer the more the Administrative Building goes far away.

=== Forests ===
There is an artificial forest on the campus. Called "Matihar Udyan", it is situated on the easternmost side of the campus. The university fire station is situated near its southern side.

=== Parks, lakes and sanctuaries ===
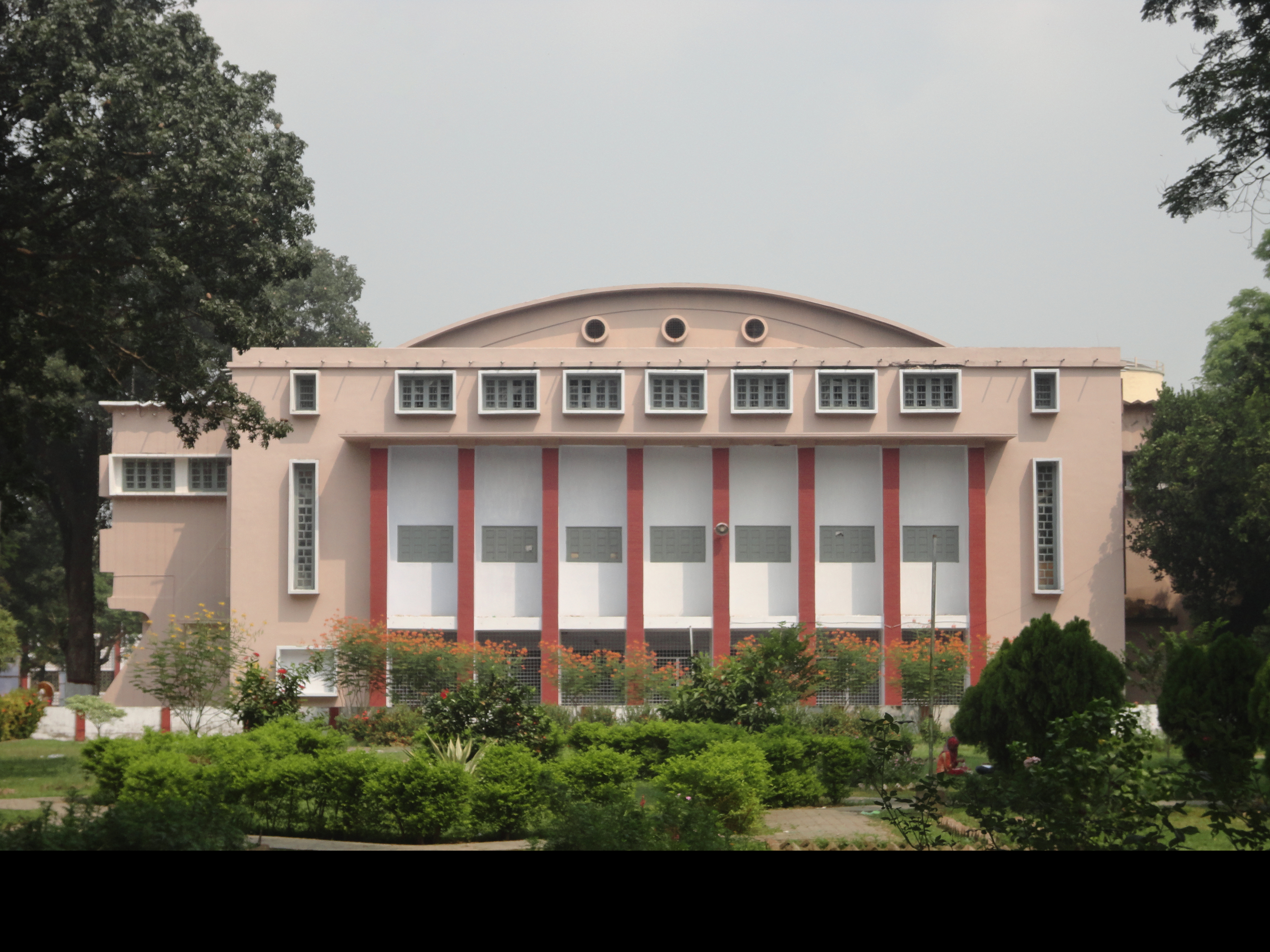
A view of Kazi Nazrul Islam Auditorium through the University Park.

There is a central part of the university near the Shaheed Minar Complex. It is a small park providing a very good environment and a place for spending leisure for the students and residents of the campus. Rajshahi University Botanical Garden is also a park inside the campus, home to some very rare species of trees and plants. There used to be a mini park-like plantation near the main gate, but it was cut down during the mid-2020s. There are two big lakes inside the campus. One is behind the Shaheed Shamsuzzoha Hall, popularly known as the Shorobor and another is behind the female hostels known as a part of the Jungle Genome Project. Apart from these, there are nearly fifty ponds around the campus.

There is a large bird sanctuary inside the campus called the Jungle Genome Project. It is an ecological project of the Zoology Department, and it has natural plantations and lakes inside it.

=== Paris Road ===
Paris Road is a street on the campus that is often considered the signature of the Rajshahi University Campus. It starts from the adjoining point of Kazla Gate Road, Paschimpara Road and Paris Road near the Juberi Guest House and runs straight East from this. Then it keeps going past the mango plantations, Kazla Pond and VC's residence and reaches Shamsuzzoha Square. Then, from Shamsuzzoha Square, it goes East past the University Bank, Second Administrative Building, University Central Bus Station, Central Mosque, university park and Shahid Minar Complex and Shahid Smriti Sangrahashala Museum and ends at the gate of the Sher e Bangla Hall.

=== Murals, sculptures and monuments ===
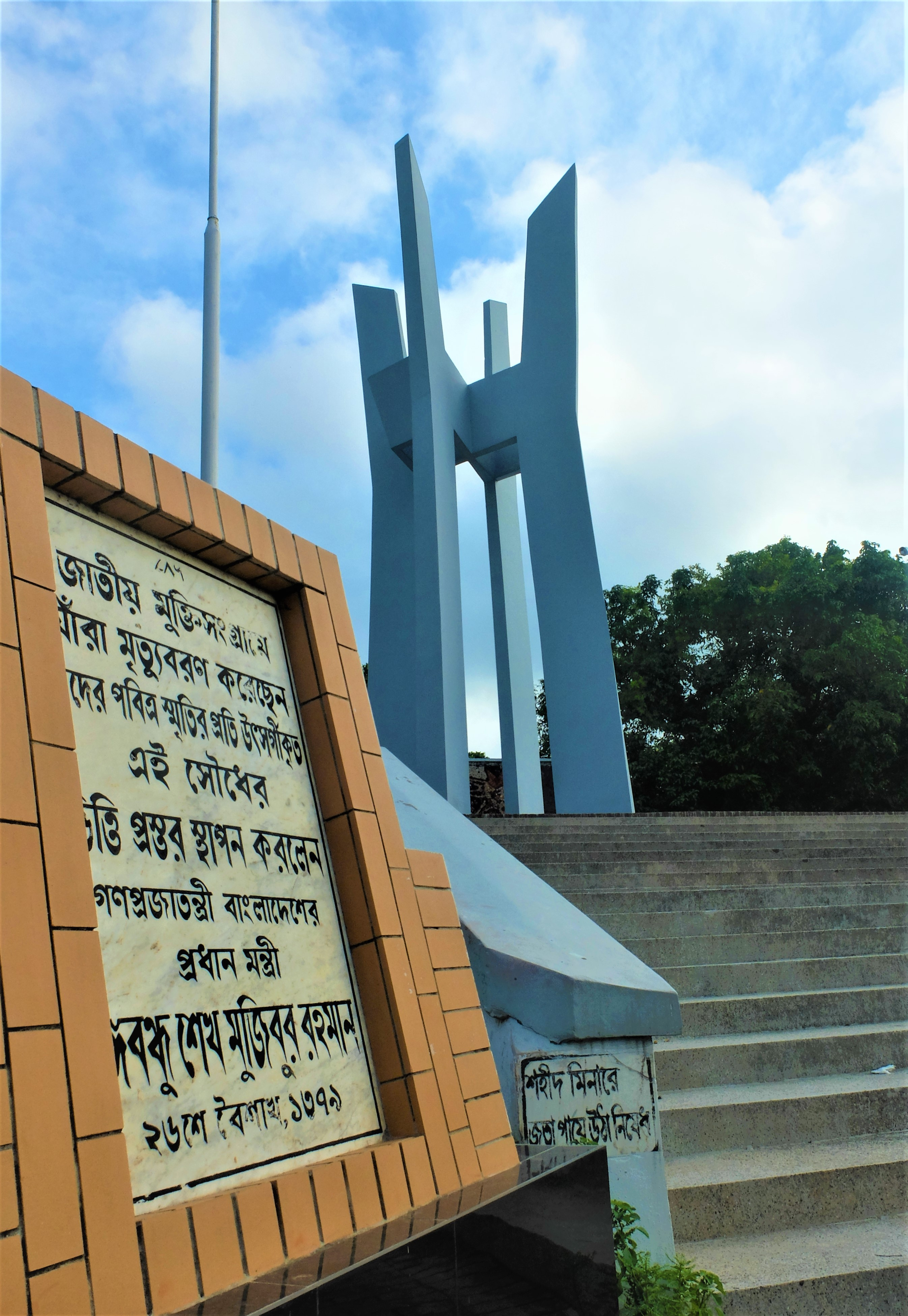
Shaheed Minar, University of Rajshahi

There are a considerable number of murals on the campus. The Shaheed Minar Complex holds two murals, one on the background wall of the Open Theatre Stage and another on the background wall of the Shaheed Minar's platform. A mural near the Golden Jubilee Tower is a masterpiece artifact made of steel depicting the struggle of men and women. Besides these, the obelisk of martyred professor Mohammad Shamsuzzoha has a mural depicting him and his famous quote. The Bangabandhu Hall, Sher-e-Bangla Hall and Syed Ameer Ali Hall have murals of Sheikh Mujibur Rahman, AK Fazlul Haque and Syed Ameer Ali, respectively.

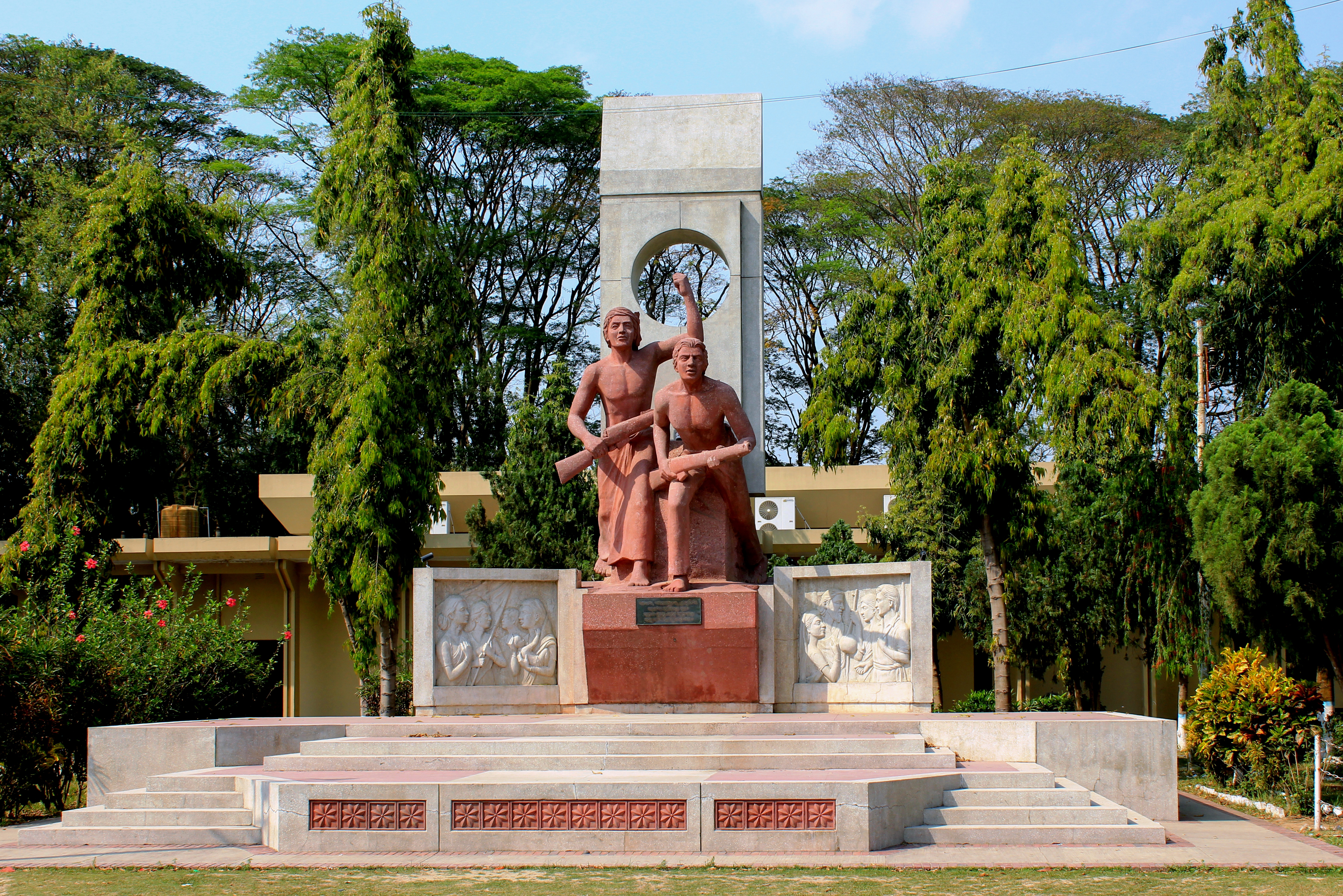
Shabash Bangladesh commemorates the Bangladesh Liberation War

Monuments around the campus are the Shaheed Minar, Mass-Graveyard monument and the Shabash Bangladesh. The sculptures are the martyred intellectual memorial monument near the central library, Sfulingo in the Shaheed Samsuzzoha Hall premises, and martyred professor Habibur Rahman's sculpture on Shaheed Habibur Rahman Hall's entrance. There are several memorial monuments and murals around the campus.

== Facilities ==
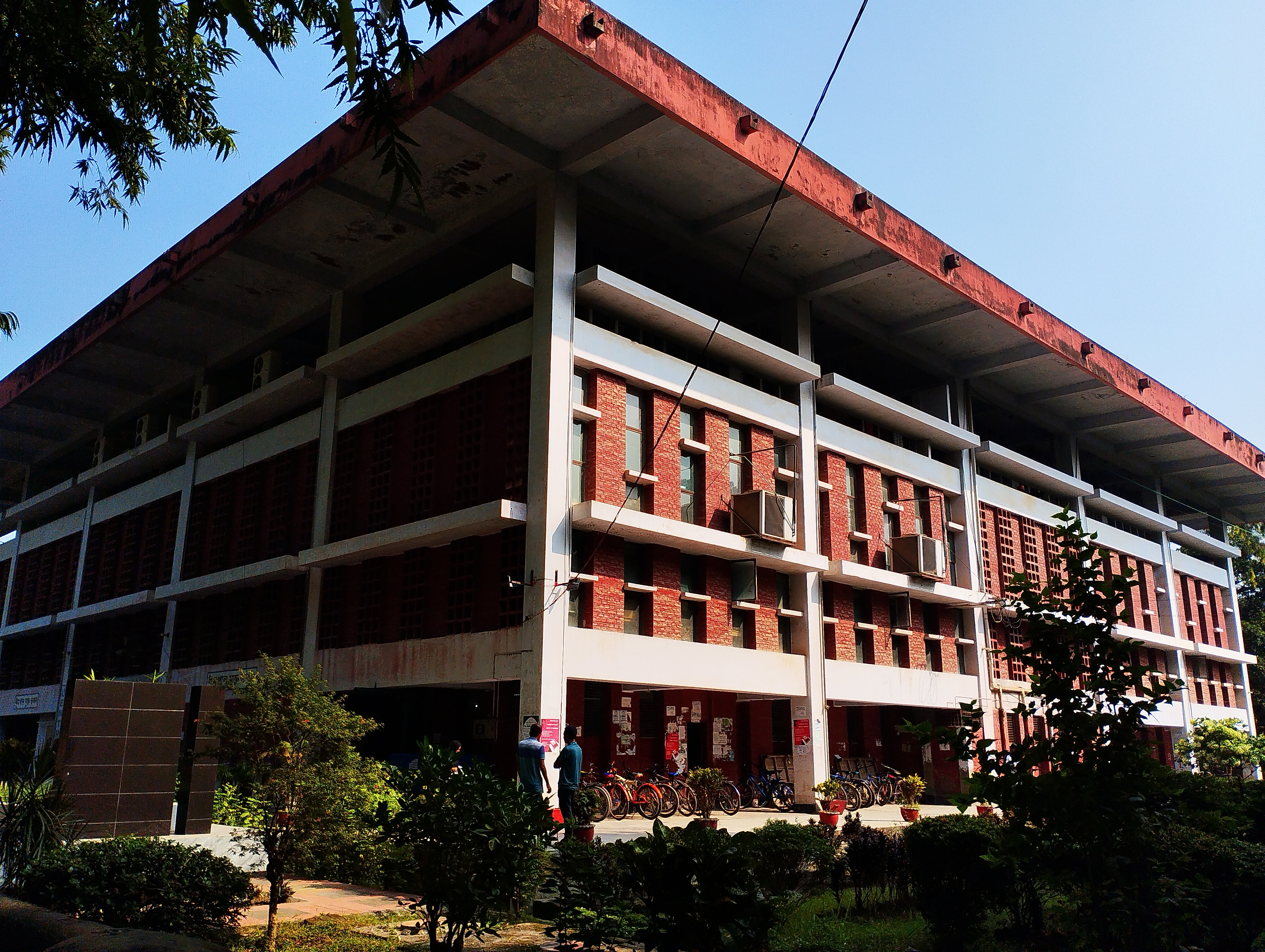
Central Library of RU

=== Museums ===
The university is the site of the two oldest museums in Bangladesh. They are - the Varendra Research Museum, which is the oldest museum in Bangladesh, and the Shahid Smriti Sangrahasala, which is the oldest liberation war museum in Bangladesh.

A few miles from the main campus is the Varendra Research Museum. It is one of the richest repertory of Bengal sculptures in the world. Established in 1910 by Ramaprasad Chanda, the museum became a part of the university in the 1960s when a financial crisis threatened its existence. Under the university, the museum has thrived, adding a folklore gallery to its impressive collection from ancient and medieval Bengal.

=== Zuberi Bhaban Guest House ===
Juberi Guest House is one of the earliest structures on the campus. It is actually a complex of guest houses, a lounge and a café. Zuberi House is the home of Rajshahi University Club, and it is the centre of the political activities of the teachers and fellows. There are four buildings providing caravansary facilities for the guests of the university. It provides gymnasium facilities for the teachers, and it has a well-maintained lone tennis court.

=== Sport and other facilities for cultural activities ===
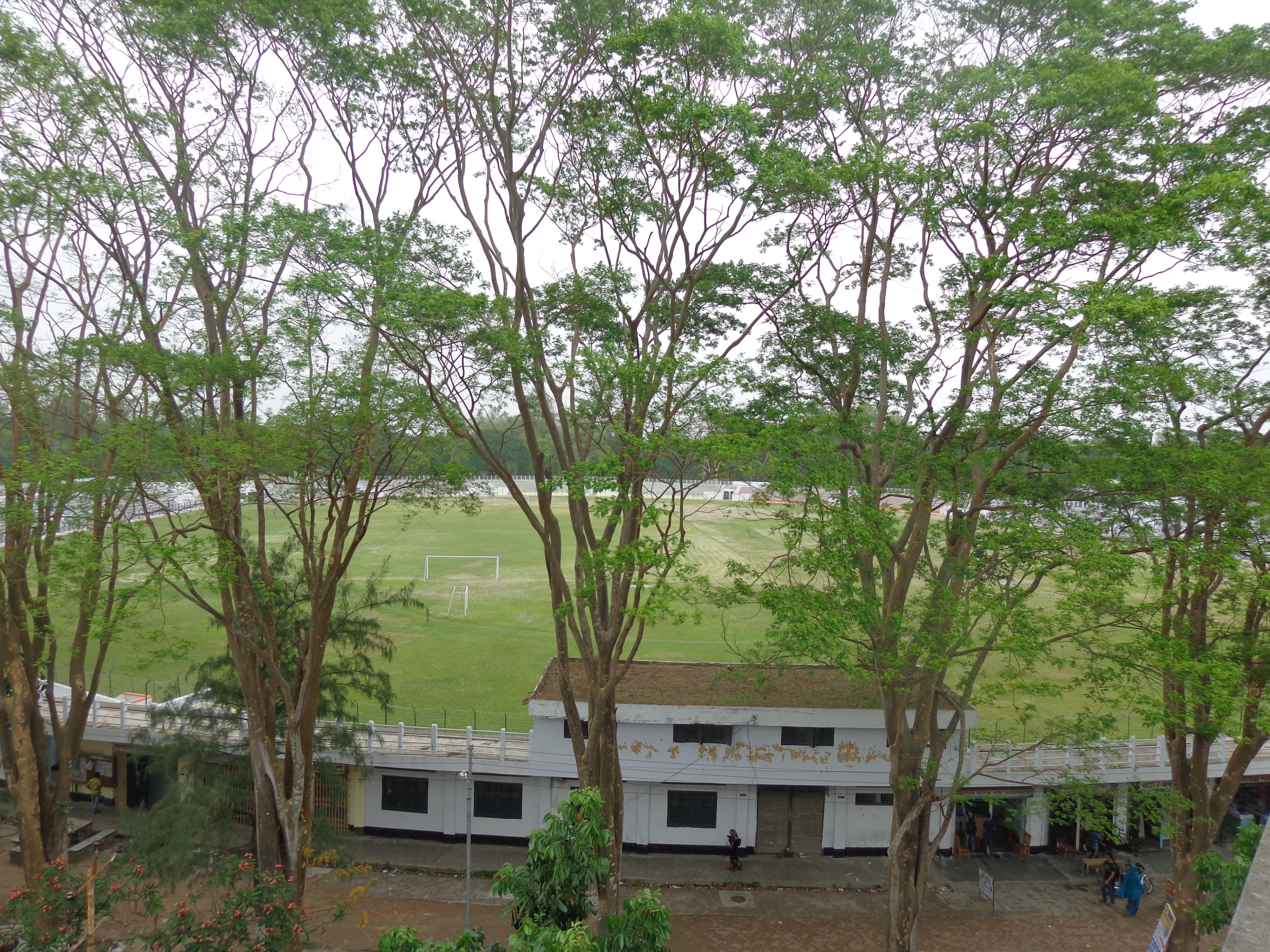
Rajshahi University Stadium

Rajshahi University Stadium seats 30,000.

There is a swimming pool with stands for spectators and a gymnasium and indoor stadium situated near the stadium.

== Architecture ==
The University of Rajshahi is home to many architectural and artistic landmarks. To the east inside the main gate is the colonial era Motihar Kuthi building, now used by the university's unit of the Bangladesh National Cadet Corps. Most of the university's academic, cultural, residential and administrative buildings are of modern architectural style. The Shaheed Minar is an important example, complete with a mural designed by Murtaza Bashir. The Senate House is a modern mini-parliament house, has 206 rooms and is fully air-conditioned. It is usually used for meetings of the senate of the university, but it accommodates national and international conferences, seminars and symposia. In front of the Senate House is Shabash Bangladesh, one of the largest war memorial sculptures, designed and constructed by Nitun Kundu. The name comes from a poem by Sukanta Bhattacharya of the same name, the last four lines of which are engraved under the structure.

Golden Jubilee Tower, a 2003 addition to the university's array of sculptures, commemorates its 50th anniversary. It is right beside the main gate. It also has an open theatre and two beautiful murals. Other well-known buildings include the library and the university mosque. The Department of Fine Arts hosts a sizeable collection of contemporary art, while Varendra Museum has a large collection of ancient and medieval art.

== Organization and administration ==
The university is run according to the Rajshahi University Act, 1973. This Act, passed on 25 September 1973, allows the university considerably more autonomy than most other peer institutions. The president of Bangladesh is the de facto chancellor, but the role is mainly ceremonial. The highest official after the chancellor is the vice-chancellor, selected by the senate of the university every four years. The vice-chancellor, as of June 2017, is M. Abdus Sobhan.

Other important officers include the pro vice-chancellor, the registrar, the controller of examinations, and the proctor. The proctor is in direct charge of student activities and is the official with the most direct contact with the students. The most important statutory bodies of the university are the senate, the academic council and the syndicate.

Most of Rajshahi University's funding comes from the government. The Bangladesh University Grants Commission is the body responsible for allocating funds to all public universities.

The tuition fees are relatively low; nevertheless, a hike in admission fees, during the 2006–07 session, drew criticism from student bodies. In 2007, the university awarded a total of 340 scholarships, whose annual value is around 1.1 million taka. In addition, there are merit awards given by residential halls, departments and the university itself. Students are eligible for the Prime Minister's Gold Medal award.

All colleges of the northern and southern regions of the country used to be affiliated with the University of Rajshahi. However, the administration of colleges across the country was taken over by the National University when it was established in 1992.

== List of Vice-Chancellors ==
No.	Vice-Chancellor	Term Start	Term End
1	Itrat Husain Zuberi	6 July 1953	30 September 1957
2	Momtazuddin Ahmed	1 October 1957	30 August 1965
3	Muhammad Shamsul Huq	31 August 1965	4 August 1969
4	Syed Sajjad Hussain	5 August 1969	18 July 1971
5	Muhammad Abdul Bari	19 July 1971	8 January 1972
6	Khan Sarwar Murshid	1 February 1972	3 August 1974
7	Mazharul Islam	4 August 1974	18 September 1975
8	Syed Ali Ahsan	27 September 1975	22 June 1977
9	Muhammad Abdul Bari	7 July 1977	17 February 1981
10	Makbular Rahman Sarkar	26 February 1981	22 February 1982
11	Moslem Huda	22 February 1982	20 September 1982
12	Abdul Rakib	4 October 1982	19 March 1988
13	Amanullah Ahmed	20 March 1988	22 July 1992
14	M. Anisur Rahman	22 July 1992	22 August 1994
15	M. Yusuf Ali	22 August 1994	16 February 1997
16	Abdul Khaleque	17 February 1997	3 August 1999
17	M. Sayeedur Rahman Khan	4 August 1999	13 November 2001
18	Faisul Islam Farouqui	13 November 2001	5 June 2005
19	Md. Altaf Hossain	5 June 2005	15 May 2008
20	Mumnunul Keramat (acting)	16 May 2008	28 February 2009
21	M Abdus Sobhan	26 February 2009	25 February 2013
22	Muhammad Mizanuddin	19 March 2013	20 March 2017
23	M Abdus Sobhan	7 May 2017	6 May 2021
24	Golam Shabbir Sattar	29 August 2021	8 August 2024
25	Saleh Hasan Naqib	September 2024	March 2026
26	Faridul Islam	16 March 2026	Present

== Faculties and departments ==
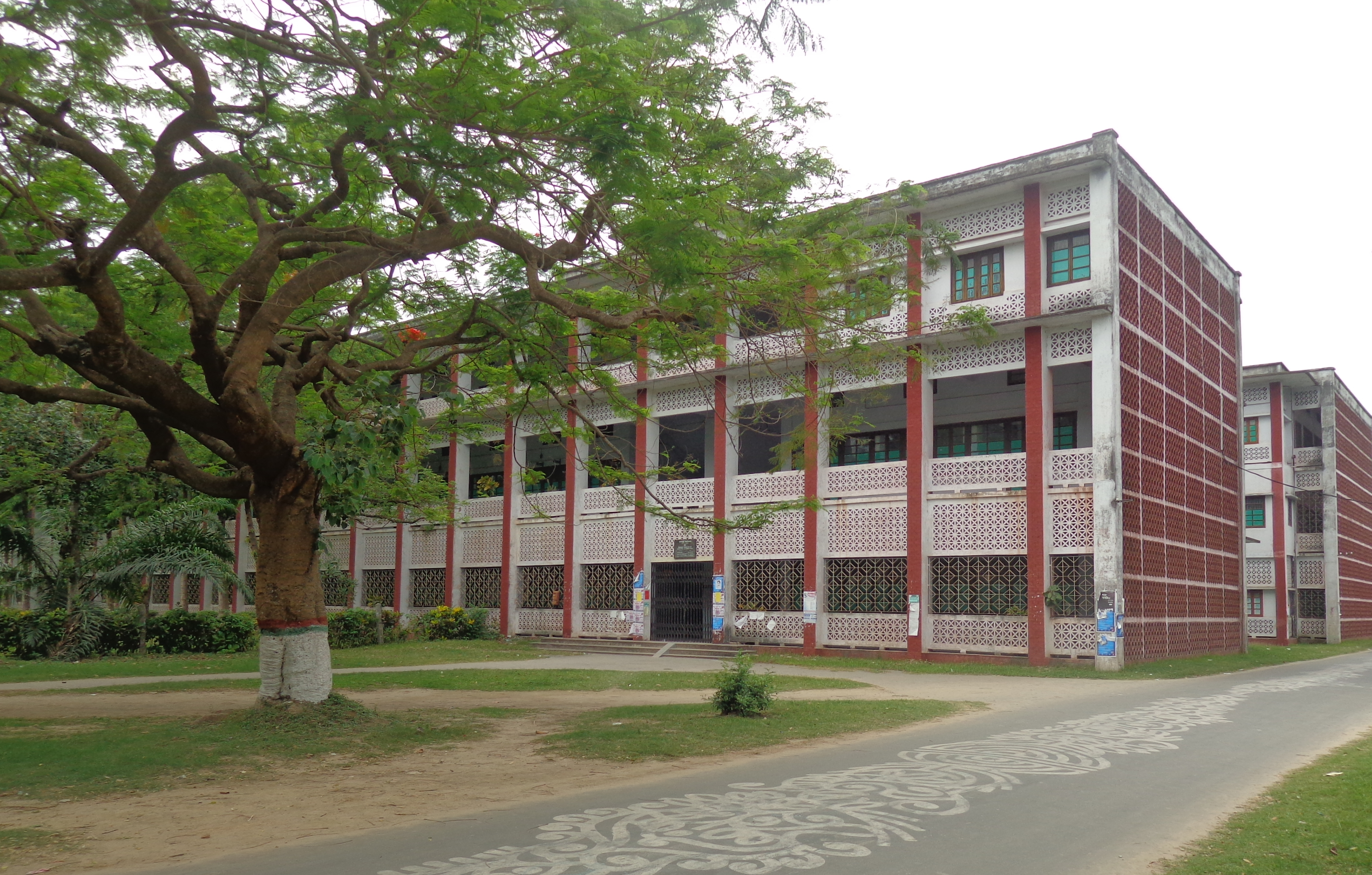
The Faculty of Engineering: Krishnachura blossoms in front of the First Science building that houses Physics and Applied Physics & Electronic Engineering

The university's 59 departments are organized into 12 faculties: Arts, Engineering, Fine Arts, Law, Science, Business Studies, Social Sciences, Life Sciences, Earth Sciences, Agriculture, Fisheries, Veterinary & Animal Sciences. The Arts and the Law faculties are the oldest, both established in 1953, closely followed by the Faculty of Science (1956) and the Faculty of Engineering (est. 2009). The university's departments represent the traditional studies in arts, commerce, sciences and engineering through programs such as English, history, languages and linguistics, economics, business studies, mathematics, applied mathematics, physics, computer science & engineering, chemistry, statistics, geology & mining, geography, psychology, zoology, botany, etc. The university is increasingly emphasizing more specialized programs such as pharmacy, biochemistry, Information and Communication engineering (ICE), genetics and breeding.

=== Faculty of Life Sciences ===
1. Botany
2. Zoology
3. Genetic Engineering & Biotechnology
4. Microbiology
5. Clinical Psychology
6. Psychology

=== Faculty of Arts ===
Prominent departments in the faculty of Arts are

1. Department of Philosophy
2. Department of History
3. Department of English
4. Department of Bengali
5. Department of Islamic History and Culture
6. Department of Arabic
7. Department of Islamic Studies
8. Department of Music
9. Department of Theatre
10. Department of Persian Language and Literature
11. Department of Urdu
12. Department of Sanskrit

=== Faculty of Fine Arts ===
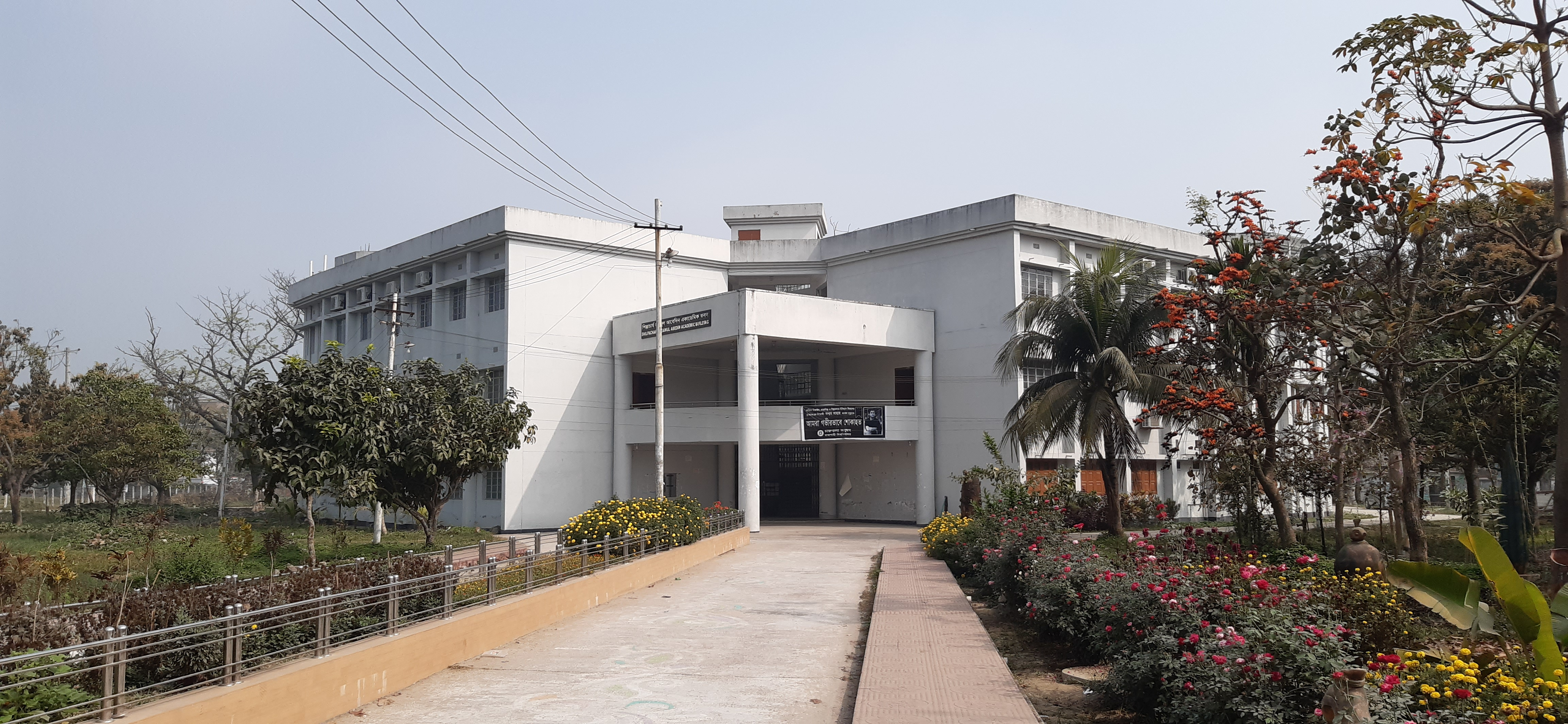
Shilpacharya Zainul Abedin Academic Building

The Faculty of Fine Arts has 3 departments;

No.	Name	Established as Department
01	Graphic Design, Crafts & History of Art	2015
02	Painting, Printmaking & Oriental art	2015
03	Ceramics & Sculpture	2015

=== Faculty of Law ===
The Faculty of Law has two departments:

1. Department of Law
2. Department of Law and Land Administration

The Department of Law is one of the pioneer institutes for graduate-level legal education in Bangladesh as well as in South Asia. It was the first institution in South Asia that offered B.Jur. Honours (Bachelor of Jurisprudence) from the year 1970. Now it offers LLB (Honors), LLM, Evening LLM, MPhil and Ph.D. in the field of Law. It has a great number of alumni and former members of the faculty around the world including former Chief Justice of Bangladesh, former Prime Minister of Bangladesh, current and former ministers and many former and current judges of the apex courts of Bangladesh and many more formidable legal and political minds of the country. Abul Hasnat Muhammad Qamaruzzaman was a student of this department.

The Department of Law and Land Administration was established in the session of 2015–16. It is the pioneer department in Bangladesh in the field of education on Laws relating to land administration, land management and land survey. All core courses of Law are taught here. Graduates of this discipline can apply for all jobs which are for Law graduates, including the positions of Assistant Judge and Judicial Magistrate. They are able to practice as both civil and criminal lawyers and also as Income Tax lawyers. In addition, they are able to apply for jobs in the field of land administration/management. It is currently under consideration that a separate BCS Cadre (Land) may be created and graduates from this discipline will only be able to apply for those jobs. The programs offered by this Department include LLB (Honours), LLM, MPhil and Ph.D.

Initiatives are under process to establish a new department in the field of corporate law under this faculty which is going to be the first institution for graduate-level education in this field within Bangladesh.

=== Faculty of Engineering ===
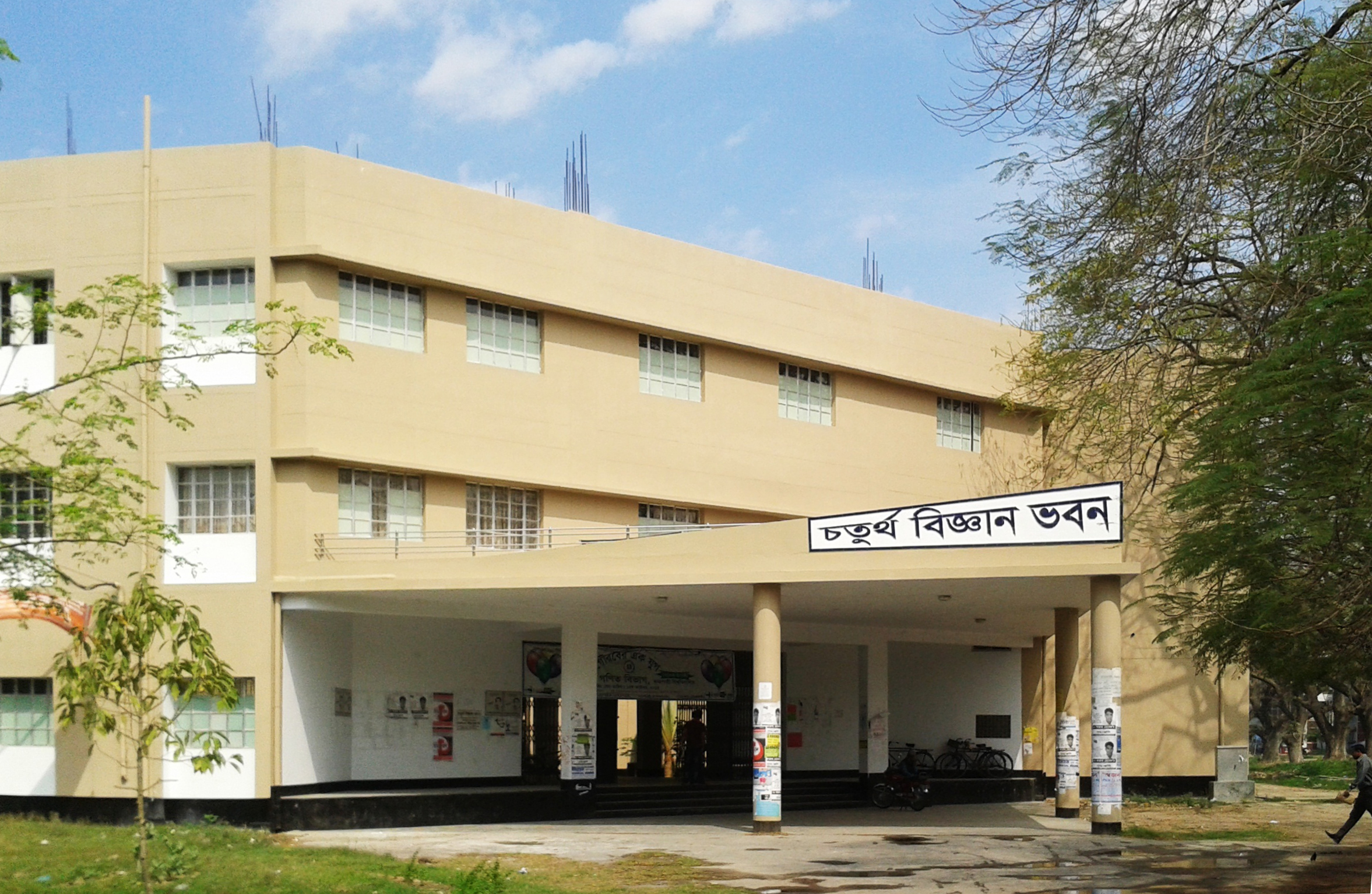
Fourth Science Building

The Faculty of Engineering includes the following departments:

1. Information and Communication Engineering (abbreviation ICE) (est. 2000), a specialized program deals with telecommunication, networking and data processing.
2. Computer Science & Engineering
3. Applied Chemistry & Chemical Engineering
4. Materials Science and Engineering
5. Electrical and Electronic Engineering (EEE) (est. 2015)

In the late 1990 and 2000s, programs in computer science & engineering and Information & Communication Engineering were introduced. The newest addition to the Faculty of Engineering in the Department of Electrical and Electronic Engineering in 2015. The university used to have a separate engineering program through the Bangladesh Institute of Technology Rajshahi, which became an independent university: Rajshahi University of Engineering & Technology in 2002. University authorities have decided to merge the Applied physics and electronic engineering department with the Electrical and electronic engineering department on 5 December 2018.

=== Faculty of Social Science ===
The Social Science Faculty has the following departments:

1. Economics
2. Political Science
3. Social Work
4. Sociology
5. Mass Communication and Journalism
6. Information Science & Library Management
7. Public Administration
8. Anthropology
9. Folklore
10. International Relations

=== Faculty of Business Studies ===
The Faculty of Business Studies has the following departments:

1. Finance
2. Accounting & Information Systems
3. Marketing
4. Management Studies
5. Banking & Insurance
6. Tourism & Hospitality Management

All of these departments are in the Rabindra Building.

=== Faculty of Science ===
Faculty of Science has the following departments:

1. Mathematics
2. Physics
3. Chemistry
4. Statistics
5. Biochemistry & Molecular Biology
6. Pharmacy
7. Population Science and Human Resource Development
8. Applied Mathematics
9. Physical Education and Sports Sciences

Most of these departments are in the 2nd, 3rd and 4th science buildings.

=== Faculty of Agriculture ===
The faculty of Agriculture has the following departments:

1. Agronomy and Agricultural Extension
2. Crop Science and Technology

Crop Science was established in 2005. It offers a 4-year B.Sc.Ag.(Hons) degree and 18 months MS degree. MPhil and Doctor of Philosophy (Ph.D.) degrees are also offered. About 250 students are studying in the department.

All of these departments are in the Agricultural Faculty Building. Only 'practical work' is performed in Narikelbaria Campus. Founded in 2000, the Faculty of Agriculture was formed when a local agricultural college was absorbed into the university.

=== Faculty of Earth Sciences ===
1. Geography & Environmental Studies
2. Geology & Mining

=== Faculty of Veterinary & Animal Sciences ===
1. Veterinary & Animal Sciences

=== Faculty of Fisheries ===
1. Fisheries

=== Institutes ===
There are six institutes at University of Rajshahi.

1. Institute of Bangladesh Studies
2. Institute of Biological Science
3. Institute of Business Administration
4. Institute of Education and Research
5. Institute of English and Other Languages
6. Institute of Environmental Science

== Student life ==
=== Housing ===
The university has 18 residential halls for students, six for women and eleven for men and one International Dormitory. The halls are named after prominent Bangladeshi historical and cultural figures, some of them from Rajshahi. The largest men's hall is Shaheed Habibur Rahman Hall, named after a mathematics professor killed on campus during the 1971 war by the Pakistani Army. The largest women's hall is Monnujan Hall, followed by Begum Rokeya Hall, named after Rokeya Sakhawat Hussain, a leading figure in women's rights activism in Bengal.

The housing system can accommodate more than 10,000 students, which has created a deepening accommodation crisis as the student body has risen to 25,000. Apart from the seat limitations, the amenities of these halls do not always meet decent accommodation standards. This has led to the establishment of many privately owned off-campus "messes". The residential halls provide meals, which are subsidised by the university authorities.

==== Names of halls ====
No	Name
01	Sher-e-Bangla Fazlul Haque Hall
02	Shah Makhdum Hall
03	Nawab Abdul Latif Hall
04	Syed Amir Ali Hall
05	Shaheed Shamsuzzoha Hall
06	Shaheed Habibur Rahman Hall
07	Motihar Hall
08	Madar Bux Hall
09	Shaheed Sohrawardi Hall
10	Shaheed Ziaur Rahman Hall
11	Bijoy 24 Hall
12	Monnujan Hall
13	Begum Rokeya Hall
14	Tapashi Rabeya Hall
15	Begum Khaleda Zia Hall
16	Rahamatunnesa Hall
17	July-36 Hall
18	Shaheed Mir Abdul Qauyum Int'l Dormitory

=== Activities ===
The physical education department of the university has 27 instructors and is equipped with a 25,000-seat stadium, two gymnasiums, one swimming pool, four football grounds, one hockey ground, four tennis courts, two basketball courts and a squash court.

The Teacher Students Center was designed to be the centre of cultural activities of the university. The reception of fresh students, the celebration of national holidays, and the annual cultural competition are key cultural events at the campus. The university is home to recitation groups like Shwanan, and drama groups like Anushilon and the Rajshahi University Drama Association. A vibrant fine arts scene thrives around the Department of Fine Arts, and the campus hosts exhibitions each year. The university has branches of all major national cultural groups, including Udichi and Gono Natto Shongstha.

During the three major national days — Language Movement Day (21 February), Independence Day (26 March) and Victory Day (16 December) — the university hosts public meetings, cultural programs and political activities. On these days, students and teachers, going barefoot, congregate around the Shaheed Minar and pay their respect. During the major Muslim religious occasions of Eid, the university is usually deserted as students go home to be with their families. Other religiously important days like Shabe-barat are observed through discussions and religious activities. The major Hindu festival celebrated in the university is Saraswati Puja—Saraswati, the goddess of knowledge, is worshipped in a central location as well as individually in many residential halls. The Bengali new year, Pohela Baisakh is also observed with much pomp.

== Incidents and controversies ==
During the 1980s, the four-year honors course took as long as eight years due to the session backlogs, resulting mainly from conflicts between factions of political groups. Since the early 1990s, student politics has been calmer, with student body elections not being held for more than a decade. The student groups have been demanding elections whereas others feel student politics should be banned.

In late 2004 and early 2005, two professors of Rajshahi University were assassinated within three months: Yunus from the Economics department in December 2004 and Taher from the Geology and Mining department in February 2005. Both murders were suspected to be driven by political motivations. In 2006, the commander of Jama'atul Mujahideen Bangladesh admitted to the Rapid Action Battalion interrogators that his operatives carried out the attack on Yunus, as well as the 2004 attack on writer Humayun Azad, the murder of another writer, bomb blasts, and attacks on cinemas.

Around the same time, a controversy over the hiring of over 500 new employees broke; detractors suggested that they were hired illegally, either in return for money or for political reasons.

In 2005, Muhammad Asadullah Al-Ghalib, a professor of the Department of Arabic, was arrested on suspicion of militant activities but was acquitted of all charges in 2008.

In August 2007, six detained professors of the university were temporarily suspended for their involvement in organizing protests that violated Emergency Power Rules, though they were discharged later from allegations and returned to the university.

In November 2017, a woman student was abducted from the university campus, sparking protests by students demanding her rescue and improved security on the campus.

In July 2018, protests and counter-violence erupted at various universities over the "quota reform movement," which sought to change the quota system that allocated 56% of Bangladesh government jobs to specific "entitled" classes. Vice-chancellor M. Abdus Sobhan dismissed the quota-reform movement as an "antigovernmental movement with a motive to carry out sabotage."

The student and quota-reform movement leader Toriqul Islam, and 15 others, were attacked during their protest march, on 2 July 2018, by opposing students. The Daily Star, which filmed the incident, identified 10 of the attackers as leaders and activists of the Bangladesh Chhatra League, a pro-Awami League (Bangladesh's ruling party) student organization. Video footage and photos published in Bangladeshi media showed BCL men with sticks, bamboo poles, a dagger and a hammer beating Toriqul, who suffered a broken leg and severe head injury. Several police officers standing nearby (unaware the incident was being filmed) did not intervene until the attack was finished, then took the victim to a hospital without arresting any of the attackers, publicly denying it was anything more than a "scuffle." University authorities declined to investigate, for lack of a filed complaint. Images of the attack, distributed on social media, sparked widespread criticism over police and university administration inaction.

Despite student Toriqul's unresolved major injuries, the university's Rajshahi Medical College Hospital discharged him 5 July 2018, forcing his doctor to arrange for immediate surgery elsewhere.

== Gallery ==
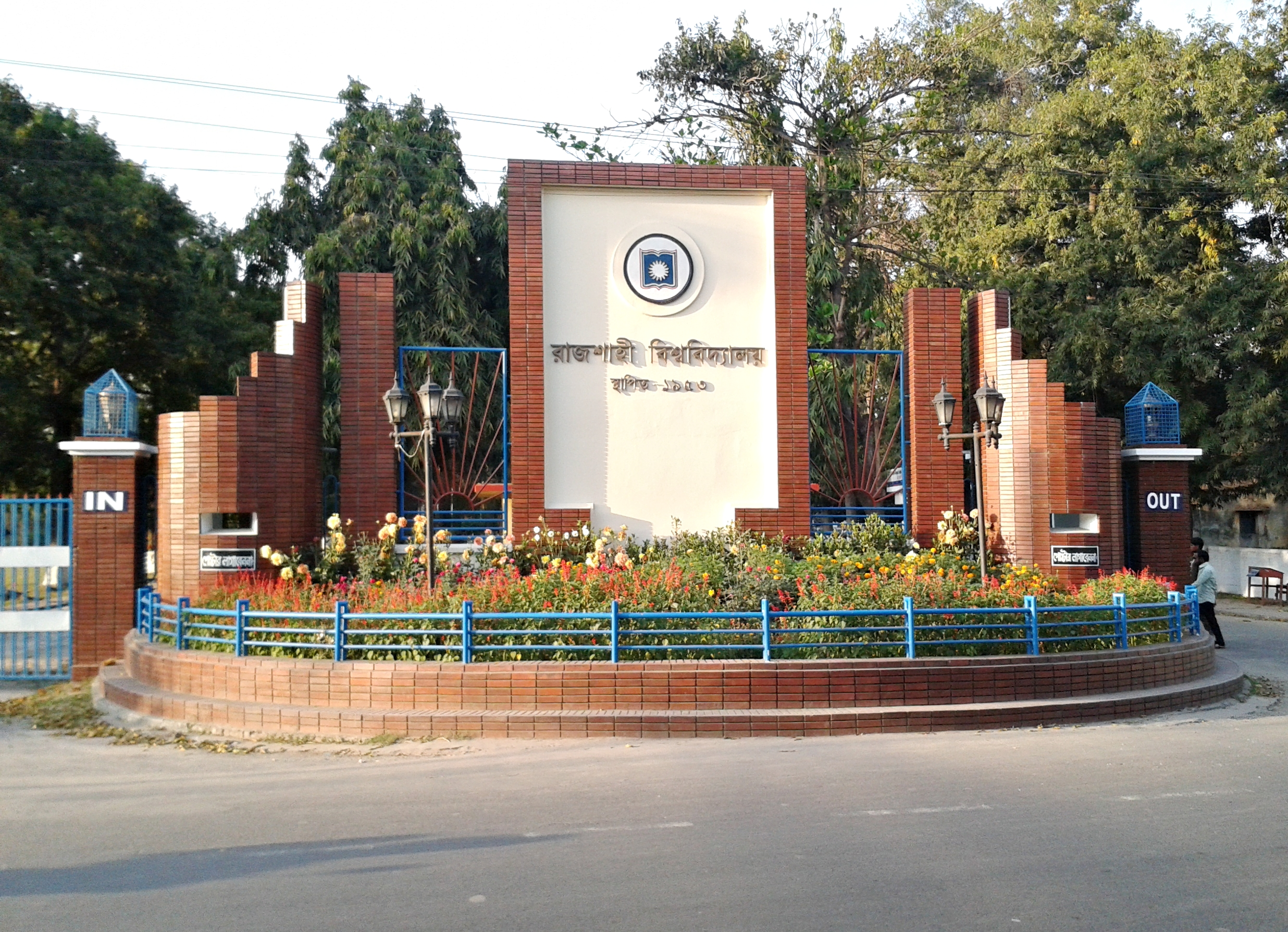
Main Gate

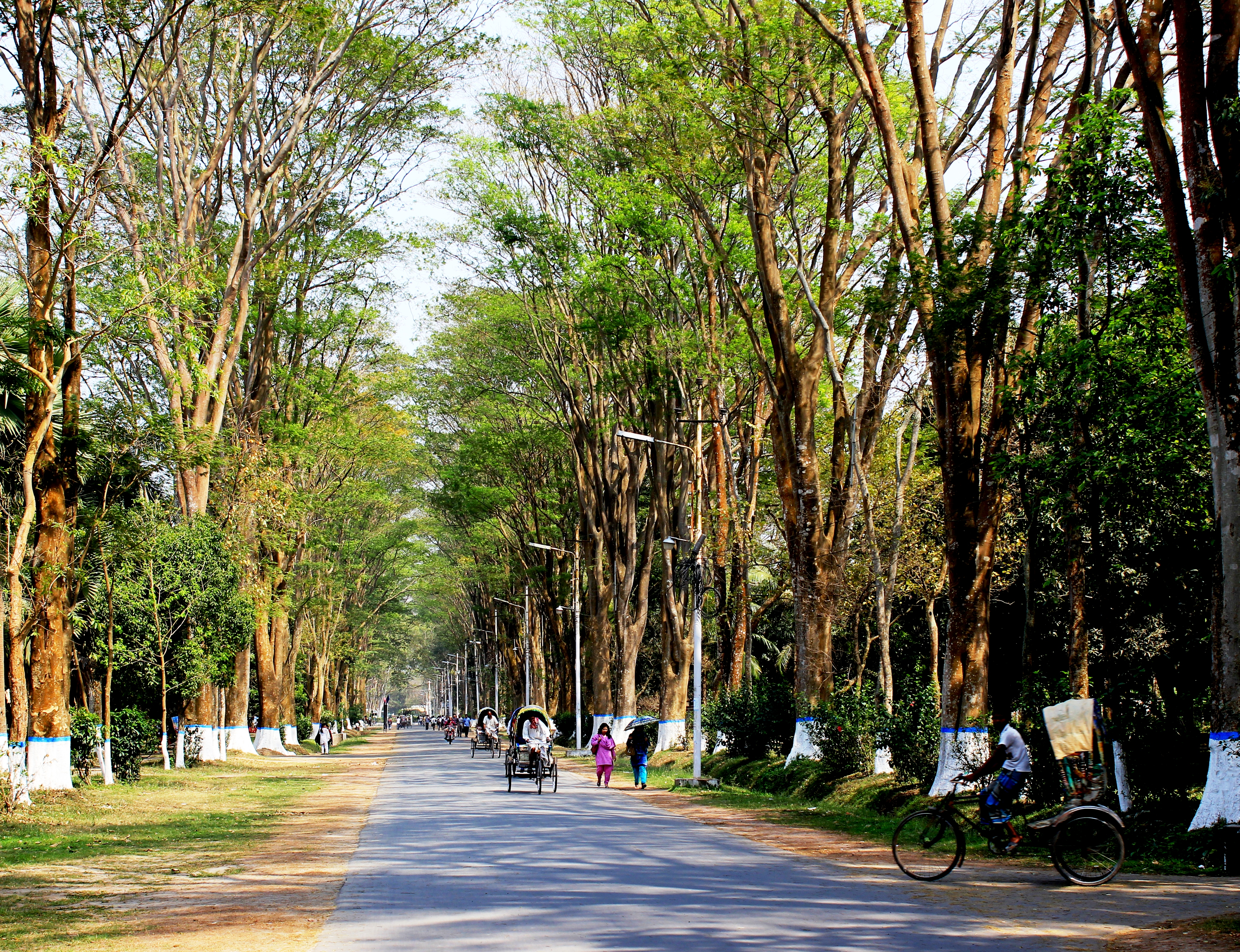
Paris Road

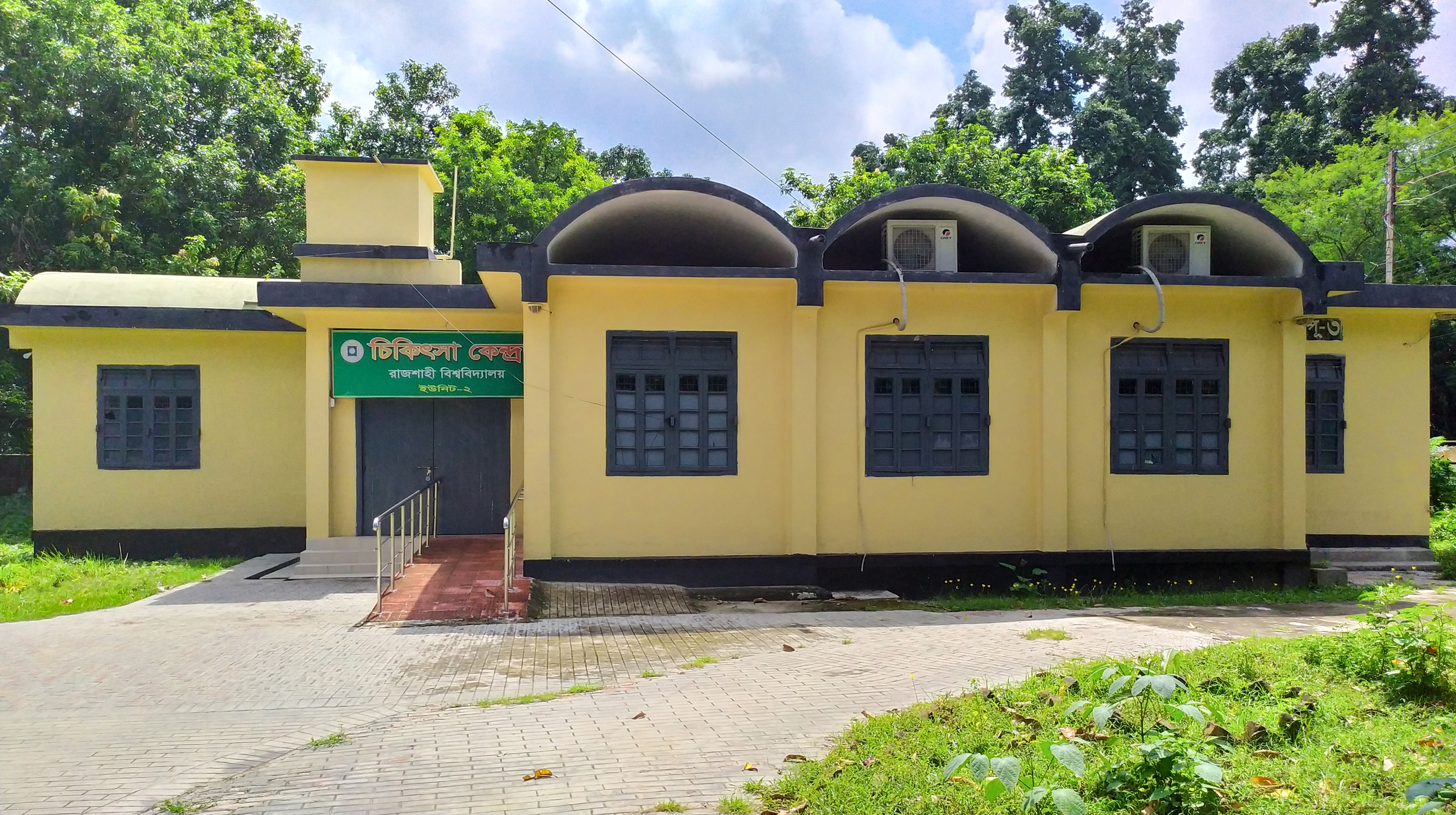
Medical Center

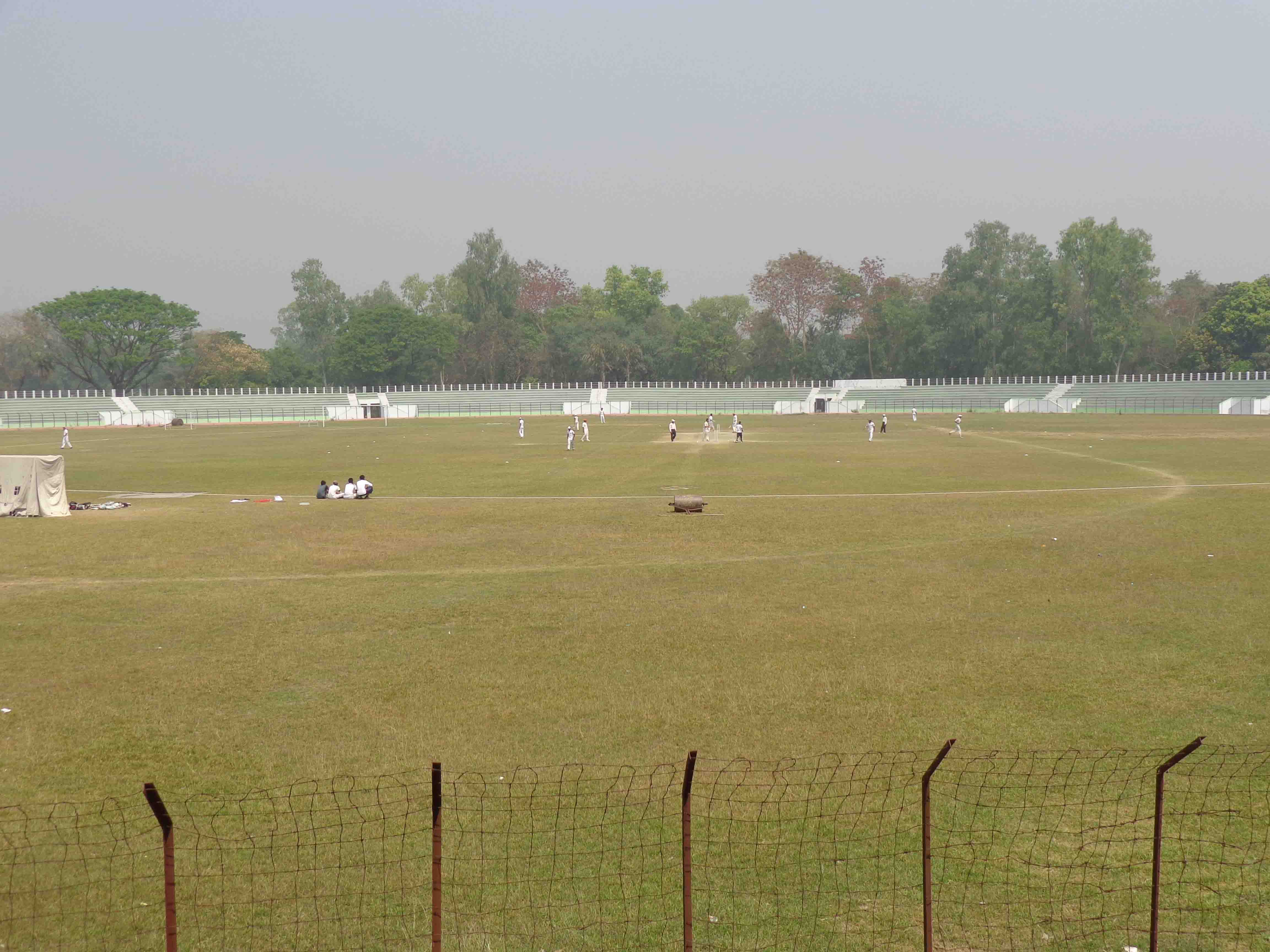
Stadium

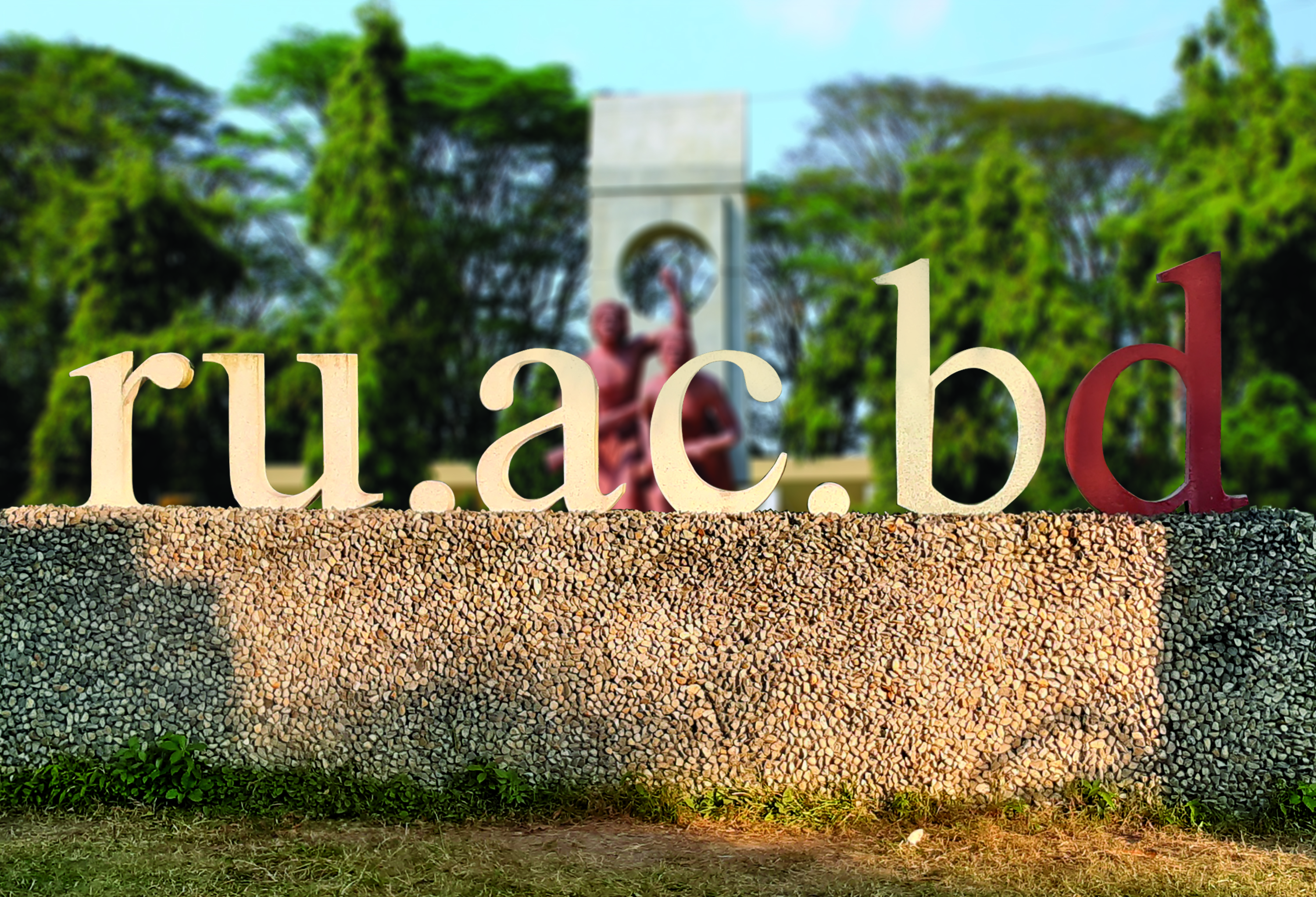
Website Mural

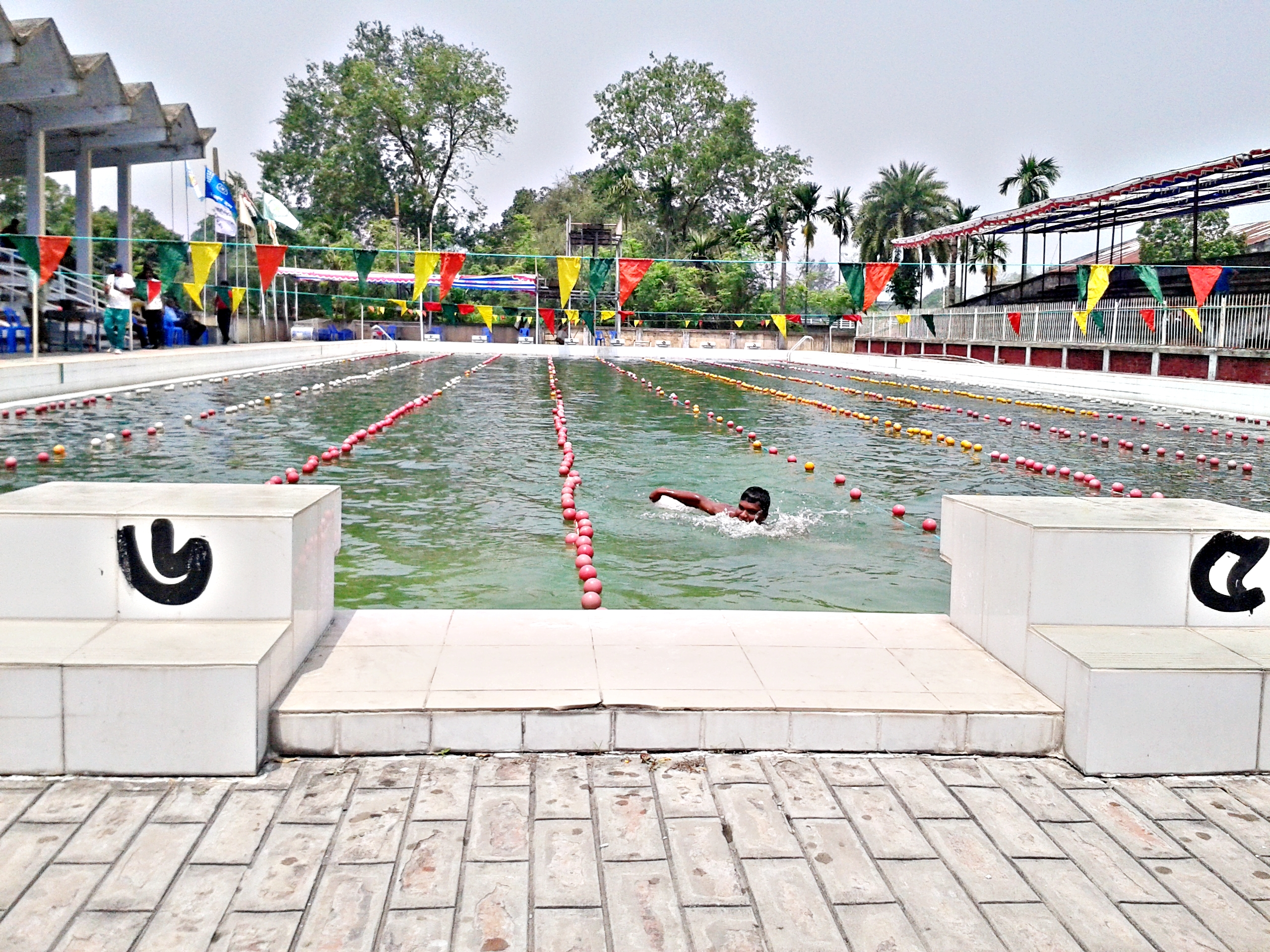
Swimming Pool

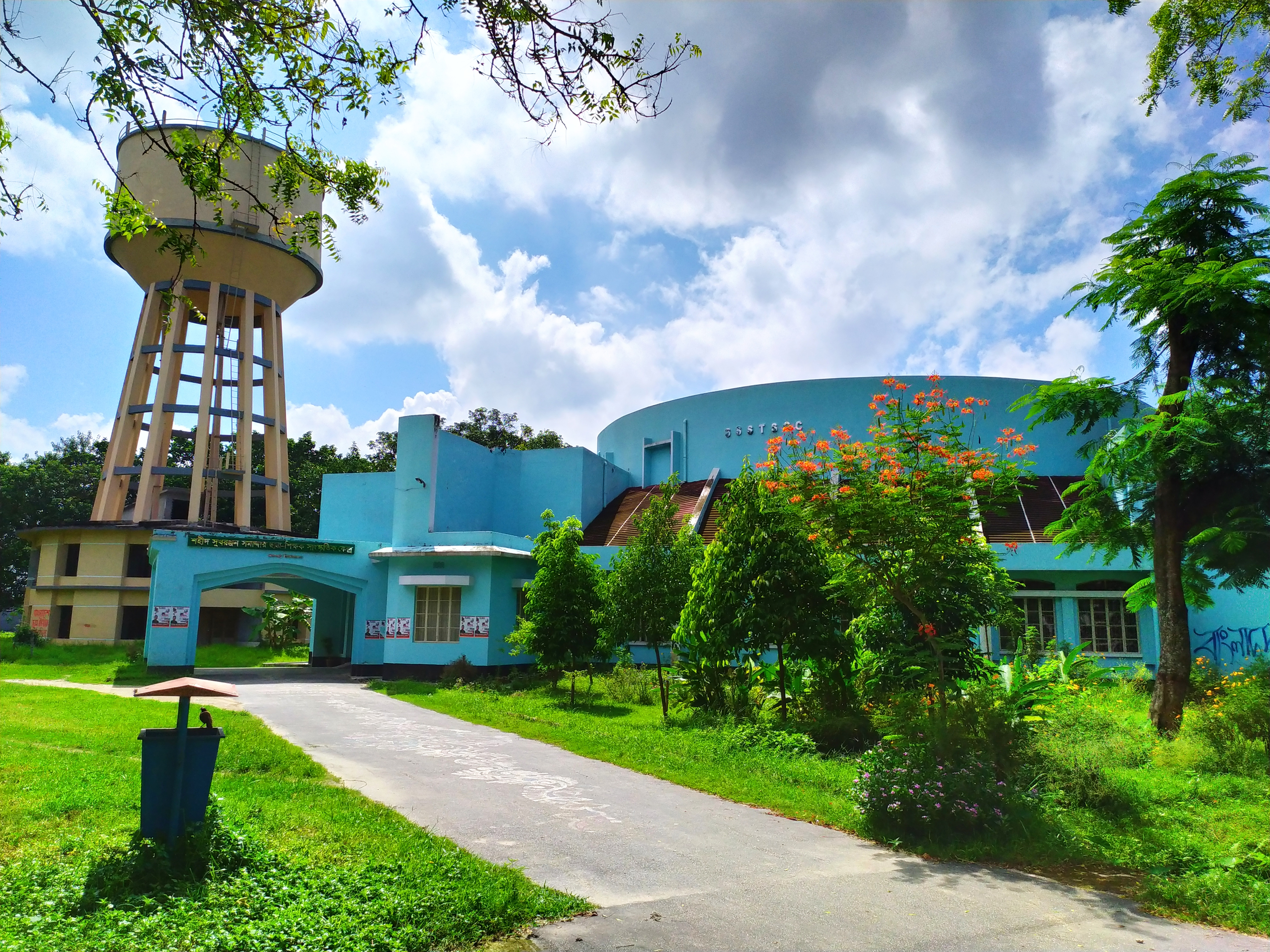
TSCC

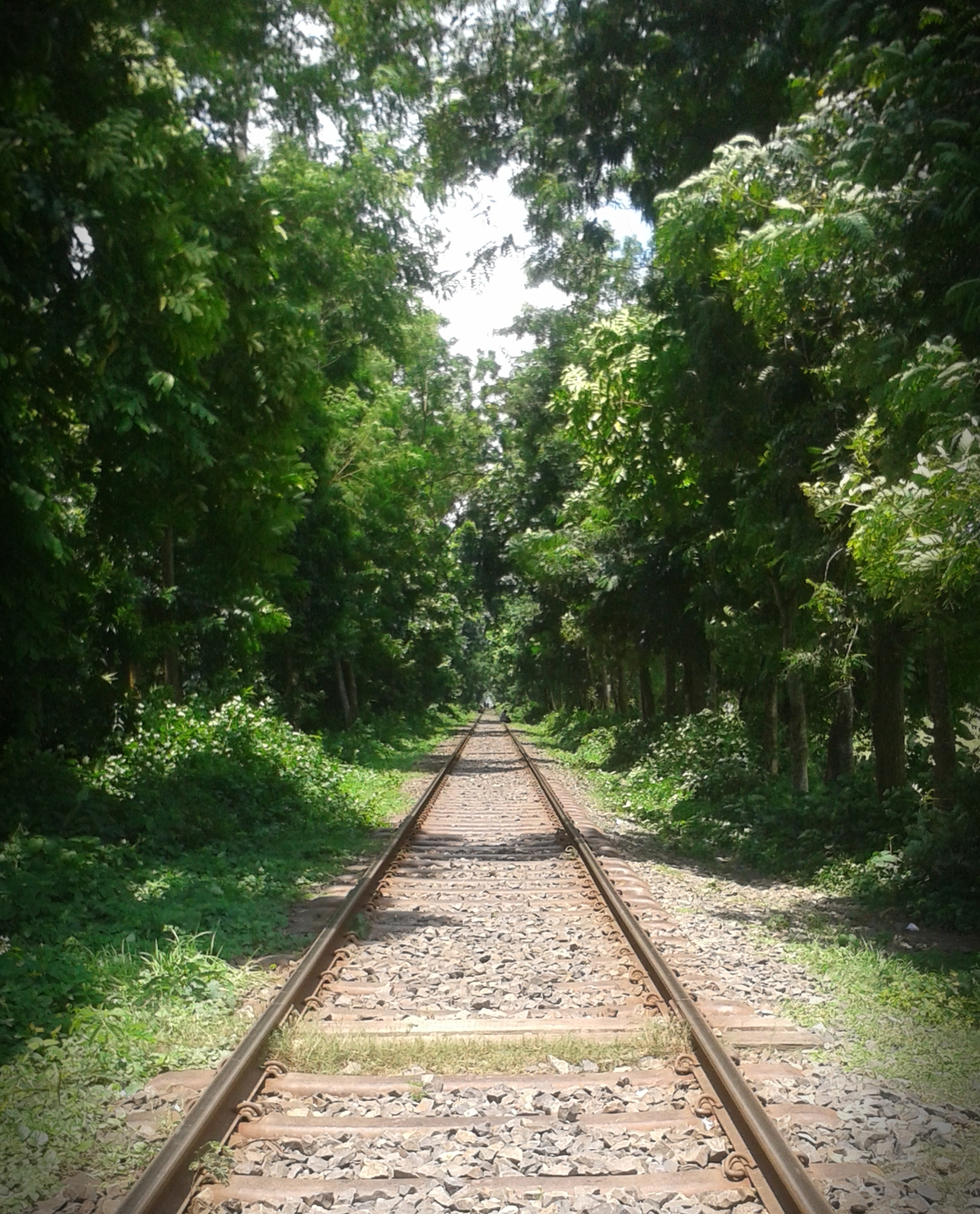
Rail Line

== Affiliated institutions ==
=== Affiliating national professional academies ===
1. Bangladesh Police Academy.

=== Affiliating non-government engineering tech colleges ===
1. Abul Hossain College of Engineering, Rangpur
2. Advanced Engineering College, Rajshahi
3. Ashrai Engineering College, Rajshahi
4. BCMC College of Engineering and Technology, Jessore
5. Epsilon Engineering College, Rajshahi
6. Global Institute of Science and Technology, Rajshahi
7. Imperial College of Engineering, Khulna
8. KSFL Engineering College, Dinajpur
9. Pabna Engineering College, Pabna
10. Rajshahi Engineering Science & Technology college, Rajshahi
11. Rangpur Engineering College
12. South East Engineering College, Khulna
13. TMSS Engineering College, Thengamara (Rangpur Road), Bogra
14. United B.Sc. Engineering College

=== Affiliating non-government agriculture colleges ===
1. Shaheed Shamsuzzoha Institute of Biosciences, Rajshahi
2. International Institute of Applied Science & Technology, Rangpur
3. Henry Institute of Bioscience and Technology, Sirajganj
4. Anowara College of Bioscience, Dinajpur
5. Rajshahi Institute of Biosciences, Rajshahi
6. Varendra Institute of Biosciences
7. Udayan College of Bioscience & Technology, Rajshahi (UCBT)
8. Bhashasoinik Gaziul Haque Institute of Bioscience, Bogura
9. Tamaltala Agriculture and Technical College, Natore

=== Rajshahi University School ===
Rajshahi University School and College (Bengali: রাজশাহী বিশ্ববিদ্যালয় স্কুল ও কলেজ) is a co-educational Bangladeshi school and college located within the southwestern part of the university. It was established in 1966. The school has 2,200 students and employs 43 teaching staff.

The school was started in February 1966 on an experimental basis, operating out of Rajshahi University's Mannujan Hall. It began as a primary school up to class II. Each year it was extended by one or two classes until it became a high school. To accommodate the rising number of pupils, it was moved to the Juberi Building. The university's psychology department took over the school for their research. It was shifted again, this time to the department's former location, the tin-shed. By the mid-1970s, it was called The Experimental School. The higher secondary section was added in 1983. The school was moved into a concrete building. In 2000, the university's Institute of Educational Research took over the school, which was renamed Rajshahi University School. By 2024, it had become a school and college under its current name. It has 50 teachers and 2,200 students.

== See also ==
- University of Dhaka
- Jahangirnagar University
- University of Chittagong
- List of universities in Bangladesh

== Notes ==
- University of Rajshahi (2006), University of Rajshahi: A Profile, University of Rajshahi.
- University Grant Commission (2004). "University of Rajshahi". Archived from the original on 1 September 2009..
- University of Rajshahi (2004). "University of Rajshahi: Glorious 52 years". Archived from the original on 4 January 2007..
