= International Journal of Environmental Science and Technology =

- Discipline: Environmental science
- Language: English
- Edited by: Madjid Abbaspour

Publication details
- History: 2004-present
- Publisher: Springer Science+Business Media (US)
- Frequency: Monthly
- Open access: yes
- Impact factor: 2.860 (2020)

Standard abbreviations
- ISO 4: Int. J. Environ. Sci. Technol.

Indexing
- CODEN: IJESHU
- ISSN: 1735-1472 (print); 1735-2630 (web)
- LCCN: 2006204600
- OCLC no.: 7831827411

Links
- Journal homepage

The International Journal of Environmental Science and Technology is a monthly peer-reviewed scientific journal covering environmental science, technology, engineering, and management. It was established in 2004 and is published by Springer Science+Business Media. The editor-in-chief is Madjid Abbaspour.

== Abstracting and indexing ==
This journal is abstracted and indexed in:

- AGRICOLA
- Aquatic Sciences and Fisheries Abstracts
- CAB Abstracts
- Chemical Abstracts Service
- EBSCO databases
- Ei Compendex
- GEOBASE
- Inspec
- ProQuest databases
- Science Citation Index Expanded
- Scopus

According to the Journal Citation Reports, the journal has a 2020 impact factor of 2.860.

== IJEST.org website ==
It has been reported that the website "ijest.org" claims to publish Open Access articles under the name of the International Journal of Environmental Science and Technology (IJEST). However, this website is not associated with the legitimate journal published by Springer Science+Business Media. The articles featured on "ijest.org" include content that appears scientific but does not originate from the actual IJEST and often focus on unrelated topics such as nootropics.

Additionally, some articles from "ijest.org" are indexed in Google Scholar, which may lead to confusion and misrepresentation of these articles as being academically credible or associated with the legitimate IJEST. These articles may also appear in certain generative AI tools designed to summarize academic literature. Researchers and users are advised to verify the source of articles and refer to the official IJEST website hosted by Springer for legitimate content.
