= Bangladesh Physical Society =

Learned society of physicists

- Headquarters: Dhaka, Bangladesh
- Region served: Bangladesh
- Official language: Bengali
- Website: bdphso.org

The Bangladesh Physical Society (Bengali: বাংলাদেশ ফিজিক্যাল সোসাইটি) is a non-profit organization composed of physicists in Bangladesh which encourages physics research and education. It publishes the Bangladesh Journal of Physics.

== History ==
The Bangladesh Physical Society proposed holding international events and conferences in 1995.

On 11 March 2020, Dr Mesbahuddin Ahmed, chairperson of the Bangladesh Accreditation Council, was elected president of the society and Dr Mohammed Nazrul Islam Khan, principal scientific officer of Bangladesh Atomic Energy Commission, was elected general secretary.
