= List of educational institutions in Rajshahi =

This is a list of universities, colleges, and schools in the city of Rajshahi, Bangladesh.

== Universities ==
University	Established	Type	Thana	Website
University of Rajshahi	1953	Public	Motihar	link
Rajshahi University of Engineering & Technology	1964	Public	Motihar	link
Varendra University	2012	Private	Motihar	link
North Bengal International University	2013	Private	Motihar	link
Rajshahi Medical University	2017	Medical	Rajpara	link
Shah Makhdum Management University	2005	Private	Shah Makhdum	link
Ahsania Mission University of Science and Technology	2018	Private	Motihar	link

== Health institutions ==
=== Medical and dental colleges ===
College	Established	Affiliation	Thana	Website	Reference
Rajshahi Medical College	1958	RU, BMU, and RMU	Rajpara	link	
Islami Bank Medical College	2003	RMU	Shah Makhdum	link	
Barind Medical College	2011	RMU	Boalia	link	
Udayan Dental College	2008	RMU	Boalia	link	

=== Nursing colleges ===
College	Established	Affiliation	Thana	Website	Reference
Rajshahi Nursing College	1961	RU, RMU, and RMC	Rajpara	link	
Elizabeth Conan Memorial Nursing Institute	1973	C of B	Rajpara	link	
Rajshahi Diabetic Association Nursing College	1983	RMU, RMC, and DAB	Boalia	link	
Islami Bank Nursing College	2008	RMU and IBMC	Shah Makhdum	link	
Udayan Nursing College	2015	RMU	Boalia	link	
Barind College of Nursing Sciences	2016	RMU	Boalia	link	
Nagar Nursing College	2019	RMU	Rajpara	link	
M. Rahman Nursing College	2023	RMU	Rajpara	link	

=== Paramedical institutes ===
College	Established	Affiliation	Thana	Website	Reference
Institute of Health Technology, Rajshahi	1976	RU and RMU	Rajpara	link	
Prime Institute of Medical Technology	2022	RMU	Rajpara	link	

== Technical institutions ==
College	Established	Type	Thana	Website
Rajshahi Polytechnic Institute	1963	Public	Boalia	link
Rajshahi Government Survey Institute	1898	Public	Shah Makhdum	link
Rajshahi Mohila Polytechnic Institute	2006	Public	Shah Makhdum	link
Bangladesh Polytechnic Institute	2002	Private	Boalia	link
Rajshahi Haji Abul Hossain Institute Of Technology	2007	Private	Shah Makhdum	link
City Polytechnic & Textile Institute	2011	Private	Boalia	link

== Colleges ==
This is a list of higher secondary institutes registered by the Directorate of Secondary and Higher Education in Rajshahi.

=== Boalia Thana ===
College	Established	Type	Website
Rajshahi College	1873	Public	link
Rajshahi Collegiate School	1828	Public	link
New Govt. Degree College, Rajshahi	1966	Public	link
Rajshahi Government City College	1958	Public	link
Shahid A.H.M. Kamaruzzaman Govt. Degree College	1994	Public	link
Masjid Mission Academy	1981	Private	link
Rajshahi Government Women's College	1962	Public	link
Padma Govt. College	1969	Public	link
Rajshahi Education Board Govt. Model School & College	2010	Public	link
Rajshahi Cantonment Board School & College	1986	Private	link
Rajshahi Cantonment Public School & College	2013	Private	link
Varendra College	1985	Private	link
Shah Makhdum College	1969	Private	link
Paramount School and College	1997	Private	link
Alhaj Suauddowla College	1966	Private	link
Khademul Islam Girls' School and College	1966	Private	link
Madar Bux Home Economics College	1986	Private	link
Upashahar Women's College	1998	Private	—N/a
Wisdom Standard College	2014	Private	—N/a
Waymark Ideal College	2014	Private	—N/a

=== Rajpara Thana ===
College	Established	Type	Website
Rajshahi Govt. Model School & College	2006	Public	link
Shahid Mamun Mahmud Police Lines School & College	1959	Private	link
Rajshahi Court College	1984	Private	link
Kashia Danga College	1993	Private	link
Haji Jamir Uddin Shafina Women's Degree College	1995	Private	link
Evergreen Model College	2001	Private	—N/a

=== Shah Makhdum Thana ===
College	Established	Type	Website
Shahid Buddhijibi Government College	1965	Public	link
Metropolitan College	1992	Private	link
Mohanagar College	1992	Private	link
Rajshahi Residential College	1998	Private	link

=== Motihar Thana ===
College	Established	Type	Website
Rajshahi University School	1966	Autonomous	link
Agrani School And College	1975	Autonomous	link
Adarsha Degree College	1970	Private	link
Islamia College	1994	Private	link
Mirjapur School And College	1991	Private	link
Motihar College	2010	Private	link
Shahid Ziaur Rahman College	1994	Private	link
Rajshahi Commerce College	2000	Private	—N/a
Kabi Kazi Nazrul Islam College	1994	Private	—N/a
Kamela Haque Degree College	1994	Private	—N/a

Source: Rajshahi Education Board

== Schools ==
This is a list of secondary schools registered by the Board of Intermediate and Secondary Education, Rajshahi in Rajshahi.

Institutions that have already been mentioned in the college section are not included here.

=== Boalia Thana ===
College	Established	Type	Website
Rajshahi Government Girls' High School	1967	Public	link
Rajshahi Loknath High School	1846	Private	link
Govt. Promothnath Girls' High School	1928	Public	link
Shiroil Government High School	1967	Public	link
Shaheed Colonel Kazi Emdadul Haque Public School	2010	Autonomous	link
Rajshahi Bholanath Bisweswar Hindu Academy	1898	Private	link
Rajshahi Bahumukhi Girls High School	1925	Private	link
Laxmipur Girls' High School	1960	Private	link
Rajshahi Satellite Town High School	1969	Private	link
Shahid Nazmul Huq Girls' High School	1972	Private	link
Rajshahi Islami Shiksha & Govesona Kendro School	1977	Private	link
Ranibazar Girls' High School	1980	Private	link
Seroil Colony High School	1985	Private	link
Surjyakana High School	1985	Private	link
Meherchandi High School	1991	Private	link
Atkoshi High School	1993	Private	link
Shimul Memorial North South School	2003	Private	link
Baliapukur Vidya Niketon	1985	Public	—N/a
Sabitri Girls' High School	1929	Private	—N/a
Rajshahi Muslim High School	1947	Private	—N/a
Rajshahi Adarsha High School	1959	Private	—N/a
Rajsahi Night High School	1964	Private	—N/a
Jatio Tarun Sangha Academy	1985	Private	—N/a
Housing Estate Girls' High School	1988	Private	—N/a
Raninagar Night High School	1990	Private	—N/a
Choto Bongram Madhyamik Adarsha Girls' School	1993	Private	—N/a

=== Rajpara Thana ===
College	Established	Type	Website
Haji Muhammad Mohsin Government High School	1874	Public	link
Govt. Laboratory High School, Rajshahi	1969	Public	link
Mission Girls' High School	1888	Private	link
River View Collectorate School	1947	Private	link
Rajshahi Court Academy	1953	Private	link
Mahish Bathan Adarsha Girls' High Bhiddyalay	1987	Private	link
Court Model High School	1989	Private	link
Rajshahi Medical College Campus High School	1991	Private	link
Golzarbagh High School	1995	Private	link
Al-Hikmah Muslim Academy	1978	Private	—N/a
Balajan Nessa Girls' High School	1987	Private	—N/a
Biam Model School	2009	Private	—N/a

=== Shah Makhdum Thana ===
College	Established	Type	Website
Hamidpur Naodapara High School	1956	Private	link
Holy Cross School & College	2022	Private	link
Shah Mokhdum High School	1980	Private	—N/a
Nawdapara Girls High School	1983	Private	—N/a

=== Motihar Thana ===
College	Established	Type	Website
Rajshahi University Model School	2017	Autonomous	link
Danshmari High School	1968	Private	—N/a
B.C.S.I.R. Laboratory High School	1983	Private	—N/a
Sayra Khatun Girls' High School	1993	Private	—N/a

Source: Rajshahi Education Board

== See also ==
- List of universities in Bangladesh
- List of institutes in Bangladesh
- List of medical colleges in Bangladesh
- List of dental schools in Bangladesh
- Textile schools in Bangladesh
- List of architecture schools in Bangladesh
- List of colleges in Bangladesh
- List of schools in Bangladesh
