= Rajshahi Metropolitan Police =

Police force in Rajshahi, Bangladesh

Rajshahi Metropolitan Police রাজশাহী মেট্রোপলিটন পুলিশ
- Crest of Rajshahi Metropolitan Police
- Abbreviation: RMP

Agency overview
- Formed: 1 July 1992

Jurisdictional structure
- Operations jurisdiction: Rajshahi, Bangladesh
- Area: 112.16 km^{2} (43.31 sq mi)
- Population: 983,707 (2022)
- Governing body: Ministry of Home Affairs
- General nature: Local civilian police

Operational structure
- Headquarters: RMP Headquarter, C & B Crossing, Rajshahi
- Minister responsible: Salahuddin Ahmed, Minister of Home Affairs
- Agency executive: DIG Mohammad Fayzul Kabir, Police Commissioner
- Parent agency: Bangladesh Police
- Special Units: Detective Branch; Crisis Response Team

Facilities
- Stations: 12
- Armored vehicles: Otokar Cobra, IAG Guardian, STREIT Typhoon
- Helicopters: Bell 407

Website
- rmp.gov.bd
- Service uniform: Yankees Blue, Light French Beige; Combat uniform: Oak Brown, Brown Derby

The Rajshahi Metropolitan Police (Bengali: রাজশাহী মেট্রোপলিটন পুলিশ, romanized: Rājshāhī mēṭrōpaliṭana puliśa; abbreviated as RMP) is the primary metropolitan unit of the Bangladesh Police, responsible for law enforcement, public safety, and crime prevention within the metropolis of Rajshahi, a major city in northwestern Bangladesh. Established in 1992 under the Rajshahi Metropolitan Police Ordinance, RMP oversees policing operations, administration, and coordination with other law enforcement and emergency agencies in the city. The force is headed by a Police Commissioner who manages all operational and administrative functions.

== History ==
Rajshahi Metropolitan Police was established on 1 July 1992. RMP began with four police stations-Boalia, Rajpara, Motihar and Shah Makhdum with an area of 203 square kilometers in 1992. RMP is headed by a Police Commissioner.

In February 2018, eight new police stations were inaugurated and the area of RMP has expanded to a total of 900 square kilometres (350 sq mi).

== Divisions ==
RMP is divided into four divisions with four DC as head, DC (Boalia), DC (Kasiadanga), DC (Motihar), DC (Shah Makhdum).

- Boalia - Rajpara, Chandrima and Boalia Thana
- Kasiadanga - Kasiadanga, Karnahar, Damkura Thana.
- Motihar - Motihar, Katakhali and Belpukur Thanas
- Shah Makhdum - Shah Makhdum, Airport and Paba thanas

== Police stations ==
There were four police station under RMP initially, New 8 police stations were added in 2018.

- Boalia Thana
- Rajpara Thana
- Motihar Thana
- Shah Makhdum Thana
- Chandrima Thana
- Kasiadanga Thana
- Katakhali Thana
- Belpukur Thana
- Airport Thana, Rajshahi
- Karnahar Thana
- Damkura Thana
- Paba Thana
