= Rajshahi Loknath High School =

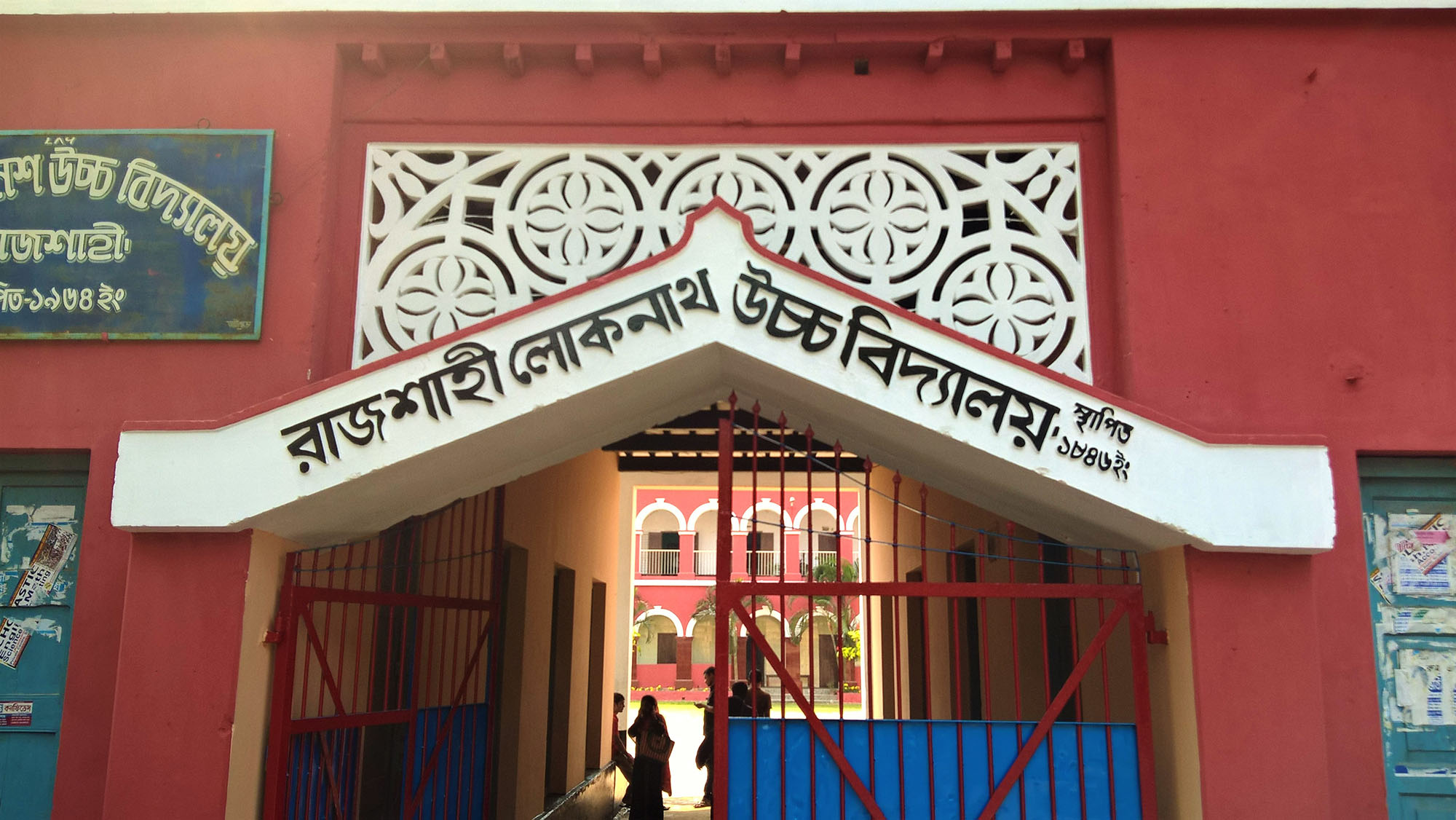
- Main entrance of Rajshahi Loknath High School

Location
- Boalia, Rajshahi; Bangladesh
- Coordinates: 24.3670°N 88.5964°E

Information
- Type: Primary, Secondary
- Established: 9 September 1846
- School district: Rajshahi District
- Principal: Mrs. Firoza Begum
- Website: www.rlhs.edu.bd

Rajshahi Loknath High School is one of the oldest institutions located in Boalia Thana, Rajshahi. The school was established in 1846.

== History ==
Late Gostho Bihari Majumdar, pioneer of the education movement in Rajshahi city, a devoted educationist and a memorable personality, served as the head teacher of Rajshahi Loknath English High School until 1950. During the early British and Pakistan periods, there was only one college in Rajshahi, named Rajshahi College. As a result, school students of Rajshahi played an active role in the Bengali Language Movement. Since Rajshahi Loknath High School was located just a few yards away from Rajshahi College, its students were greatly influenced by the college students. Thus, the students of Rajshahi Loknath High School had the opportunity to actively participate in the Bengali language movement. Among them was the noted businessman and progressive politician Mosharraf Hossain Akunji.

== Language Movement and Liberation War ==
During the Bangladesh Liberation War in 1971, the school was looted multiple times by the Pakistani army and their collaborators including Al-Badr, Al-Shams, Razakars, and members of the Peace Committee. As a result, many valuable records and furniture were destroyed. Numerous former students of Rajshahi Loknath High School have made significant contributions at local and national levels in socio-economic, political, sports, cultural development, the Language Movement, and the Liberation War. Many of its alumni also played important roles in the political arena of Bangladesh.

== Notable alumni and faculty ==
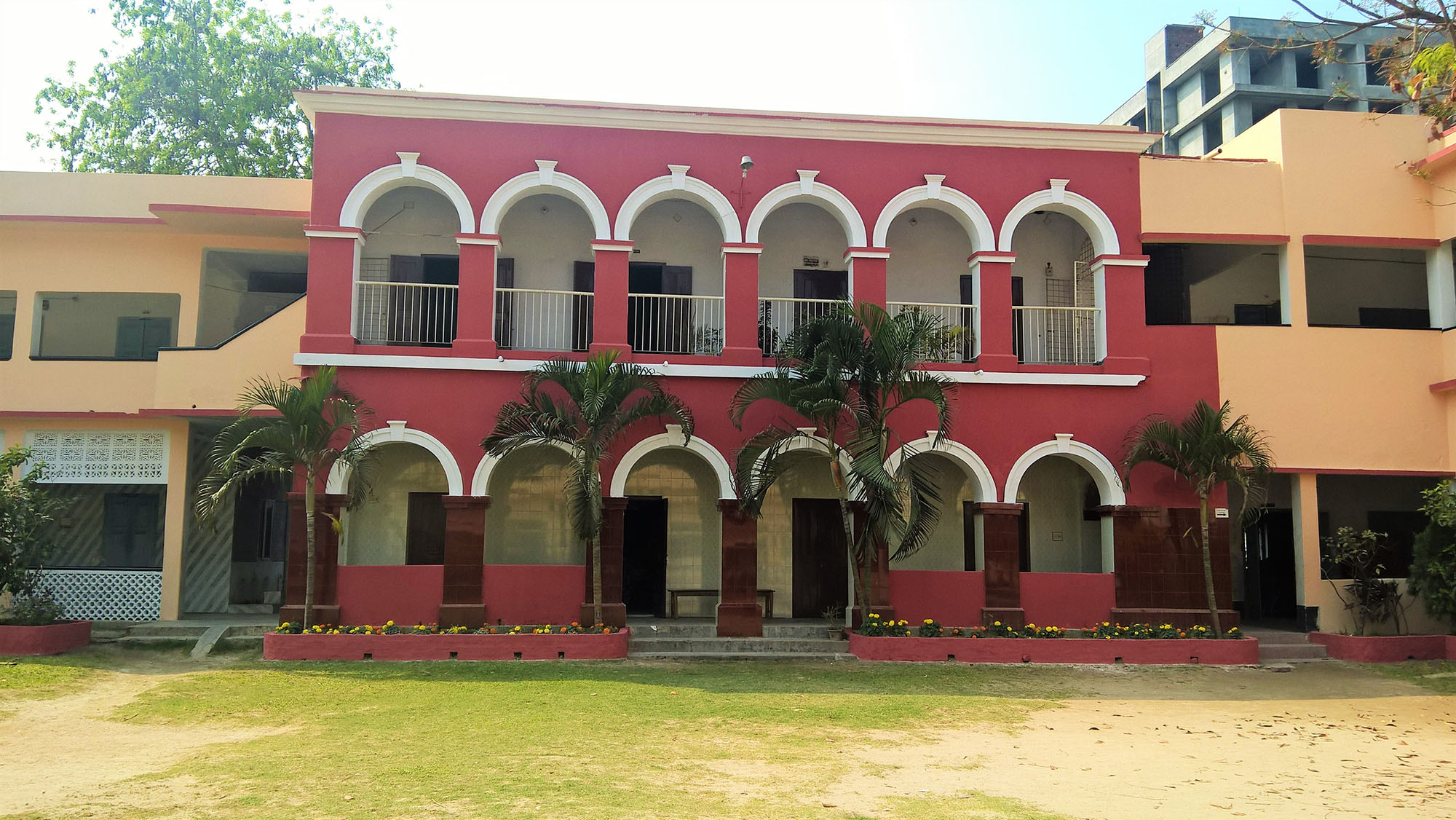
Administrative building of Rajshahi Loknath High School

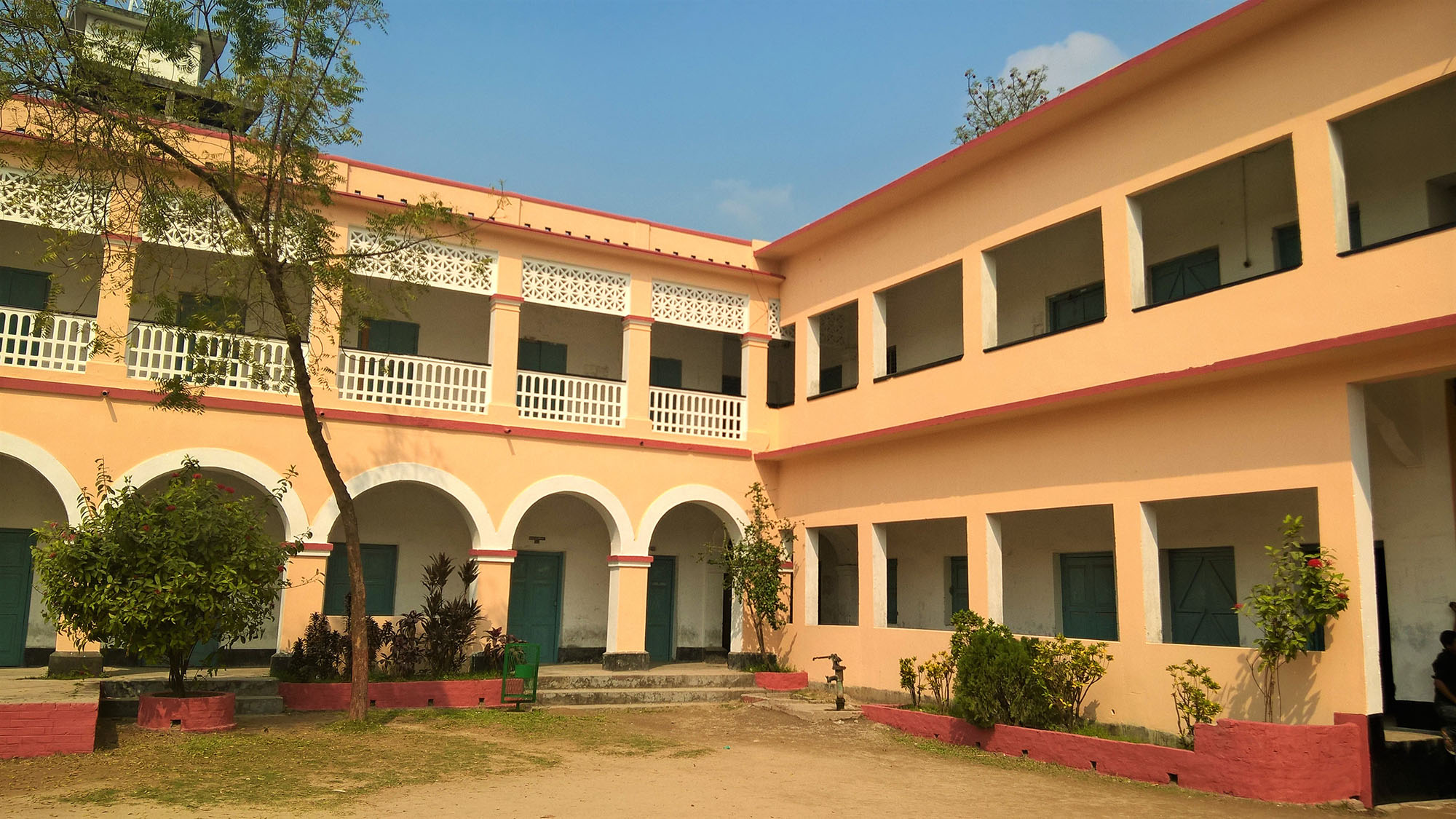
Academic building of Rajshahi Loknath High School

- ATM Shamsuzzaman – film actor
- Professor Khoda Box Mridha – sports commentator
- Sirajul Islam Chowdhury – professor of English at the University of Dhaka and noted educationist

== Achievements ==
- 40th Summer School and Madrasa Sports Competition 2011 – Football Champion
- 37th Summer Chapai Region School and Madrasa Sports Competition – Swimming Champion
- 39th School and Madrasa Sports Competition 2010 – Boalia Thana Football Runner-up. Boalia Thana School and Madrasa Football Champion – 2009
- 41st Regional (Chapai) School and Madrasa Winter Sports and Athletics Competition 2012 – Basketball Champion
- 41st Sub-Regional (Chapai) School and Madrasa Winter Sports and Athletics Competition 2012 – Basketball Champion

== See also ==
- Rajshahi District
- Rajshahi College
- New Govt. Degree College, Rajshahi
- Rajshahi Collegiate School
