= Motihar Thana =

Motihar Thana মতিহার থানা
- Thana
- Location in Bangladesh Motihar Thana (Bangladesh)
- Coordinates: 24°22′N 88°37.7′E
- Country: Bangladesh
- Division: Rajshahi Division
- District: Rajshahi District

Area
  - Total: 11 km^{2} (4.2 sq mi)

Population (2022)
  - Total: 77,573
  - Density: 7,100/km^{2} (18,000/sq mi)
- Time zone: UTC+6 (BST)
- Postal code: 6000
- Area code: 0721
- Website: Map

Motihar Thana (Bengali: মতিহার থানা) is a thana of Rajshahi under Rajshahi Metropolitan Police in Bangladesh.

== Geography ==
Motihar is located at 24.3667°N 88.6278°E.

== Demographics ==
Religions in Matihar Thana (2022)
Religion	Percent
Islam	95.53%
Hinduism	4.28%
Other or not stated	0.19%

According to the 2022 Bangladeshi census, Matihar Thana had 16,209 households and a population of 77,573. 6.31% of the population were under 5 years of age. Matihar had a literacy rate (age 7 and over) of 84.83%: 87.11% for males and 82.12% for females, and a sex ratio of 116.90 males for every 100 females.

In the 1991 Bangladesh census, Motihar had a population of 38,000. Males constituted 55.26% of the population, and females 44.74%. Motihar had an average literacy rate of 84.8% (7+ years), above the national average of 32.4%.

In the 2011 Census of Bangladesh, Motihar had a population of 62,172. Males constituted 53.80% of the population and females 46.20%. Muslims formed 95.91% of the population, Hindus 3.97%, Christians 0.05% and others 0.06%. Motihar had a literacy rate of 69.28% for the population 7 years and above.

== See also ==
- Upazilas of Bangladesh
- Districts of Bangladesh
- Divisions of Bangladesh
- Administrative geography of Bangladesh
- Thanas of Bangladesh
