= Shah Makhdum Thana =

Shah Makhdum Thana শাহ মখদুম থানা
- Police Station
- Location in Bangladesh Shah Makhdum Thana (Bangladesh)
- Coordinates: 24°24′N 88°37′E
- Country: Bangladesh
- Division: Rajshahi Division
- District: Rajshahi District

Area
  - Total: 15 km^{2} (5.8 sq mi)

Population (2022)
  - Total: 38,676
  - Density: 1,133/km^{2} (2,930/sq mi)
- Time zone: UTC+6 (BST)
- Postal code: 6000
- Area code: 0721
- Website: Official Map of Shah Makdam

Shah Makhdum Thana (Bengali: শাহ মখদুম থানা) is a thana of Rajshahi Metropolitan Police in Rajshahi, Bangladesh. It is named after Sufi saint, Shah Makhdum Rupos.

== Geography ==
Shah Makdhum is located at 24.4000°N 88.6167°E. It has a total area of 15 km^{2}.

== Demographics ==
Religions in Shah Makhdum Thana (2022)
Religion	Percent
Islam	95.70%
Hinduism	3.73%
Other or not stated	0.57%

According to the 2022 Bangladeshi census, Shah Makhdum Thana had 9,932 households and a population of 38,676. 7.82% of the population were under 5 years of age. Shah Makhdum had a literacy rate (age 7 and over) of 87.61%: 88.86% for males and 86.35% for females, and a sex ratio of 100.37 males for every 100 females.

According to the 2011 Census of Bangladesh, Shah Makdam Thana had 6,892 households and a population of 29,103. 7.5% of the population was under the age of 5. The literacy rate (age 7 and over) was 68.2%, compared to the national average of 51.8%.

== Administration ==
Shah Makdam has 2 wards, 0 Mauzas/Mahallas, and no villages.

== See also ==
- Districts of Bangladesh
- Divisions of Bangladesh
- Upazila
- Thanas of Bangladesh
- Thana Nirbahi Officer
- Administrative geography of Bangladesh
- Rajshahi Metropolitan Police
