= Shahid A.H.M. Kamaruzzaman Govt. Degree College =

Degree college in Rajshahi, Bangladesh

Coordinates: 24.3776°N 88.5981°E

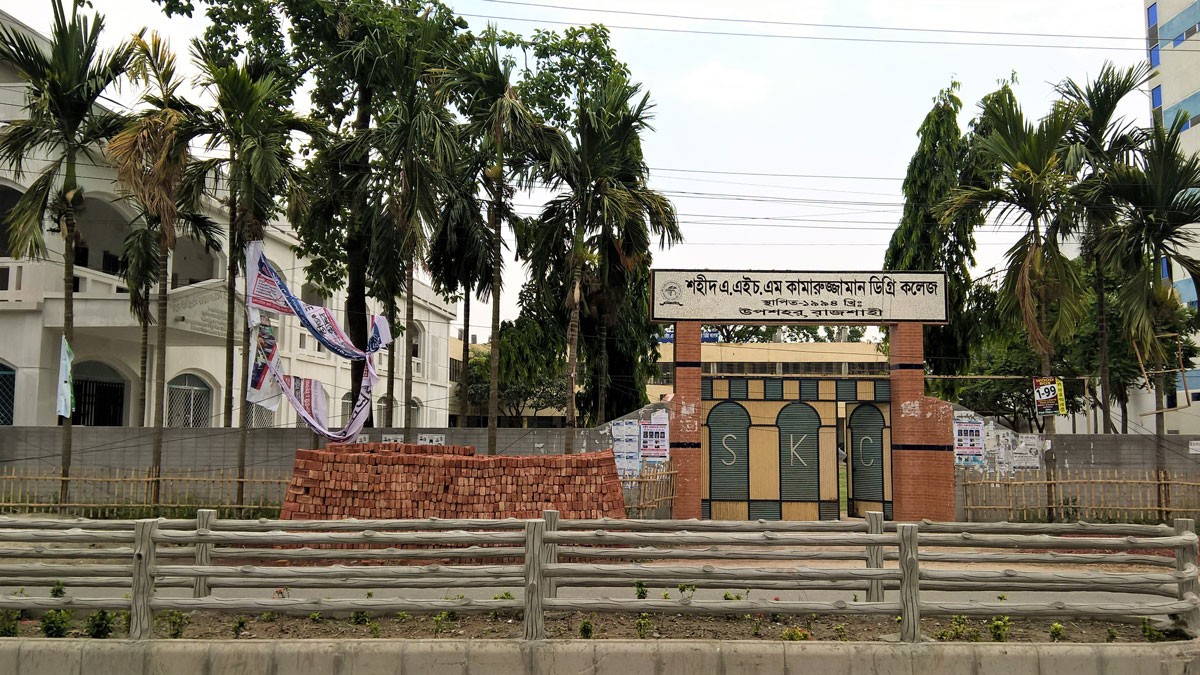
AHM Kamaruzzaman Degree College

Shahid AHM Kamaruzzaman Government Degree College (Bengali: শহীদ এ.এইচ.এম. কামারুজ্জামান সরকারি ডিগ্রি কলেজ) is a pass-level degree college in Boalia Thana, Rajshahi, Bangladesh. It was established in 1994 as Housing Estate College, and renamed after Shahid AHM Kamaruzzaman in 1997. It is affiliated with National University. This college has been declared a government college by the ministry of education in 2016. It is situated in Uposhor New Market, Boalia, Rajshahi.^{[5]}
