= Varendra University =

University in Bangladesh

- বরেন্দ্র বিশ্ববিদ্যালয়
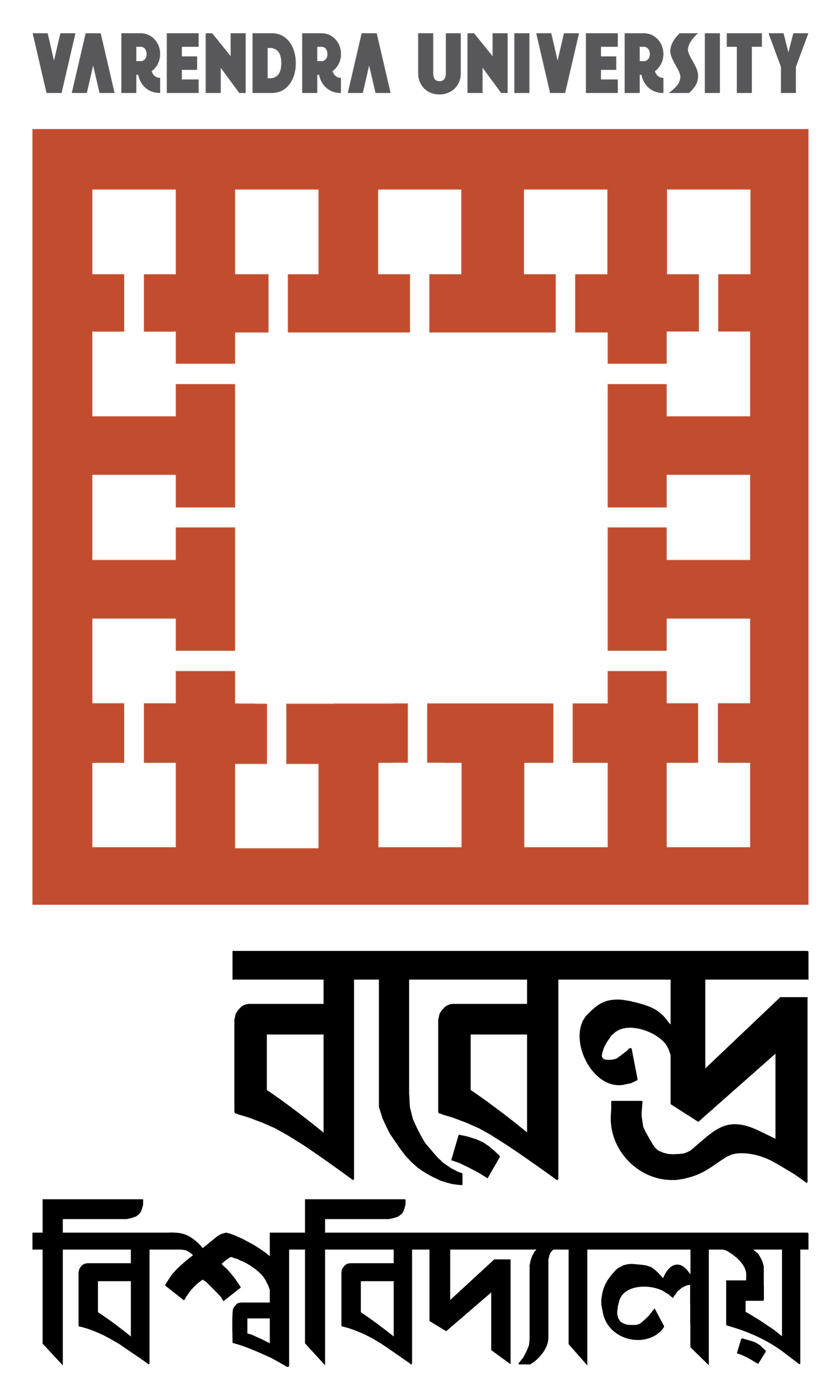
- Seal of Varendra University
- Type: Private
- Established: 2012; 14 years ago
- Founder: Hafizur Rahaman Khan
- Affiliations: University Grants Commission Bangladesh
- Chancellor: President Mirza Fakhrul Islam Alamgir
- Vice-Chancellor: Md. Khademul Islam Molla
- Academic staff: 250
- Students: 6500+
- Location: Rajshahi, 6204, Bangladesh; 24.3993°N 88.6452°E
- Campus: Urban
- Language: English
- Colors: Brown, Gray, Black
- Website: vu.edu.bd

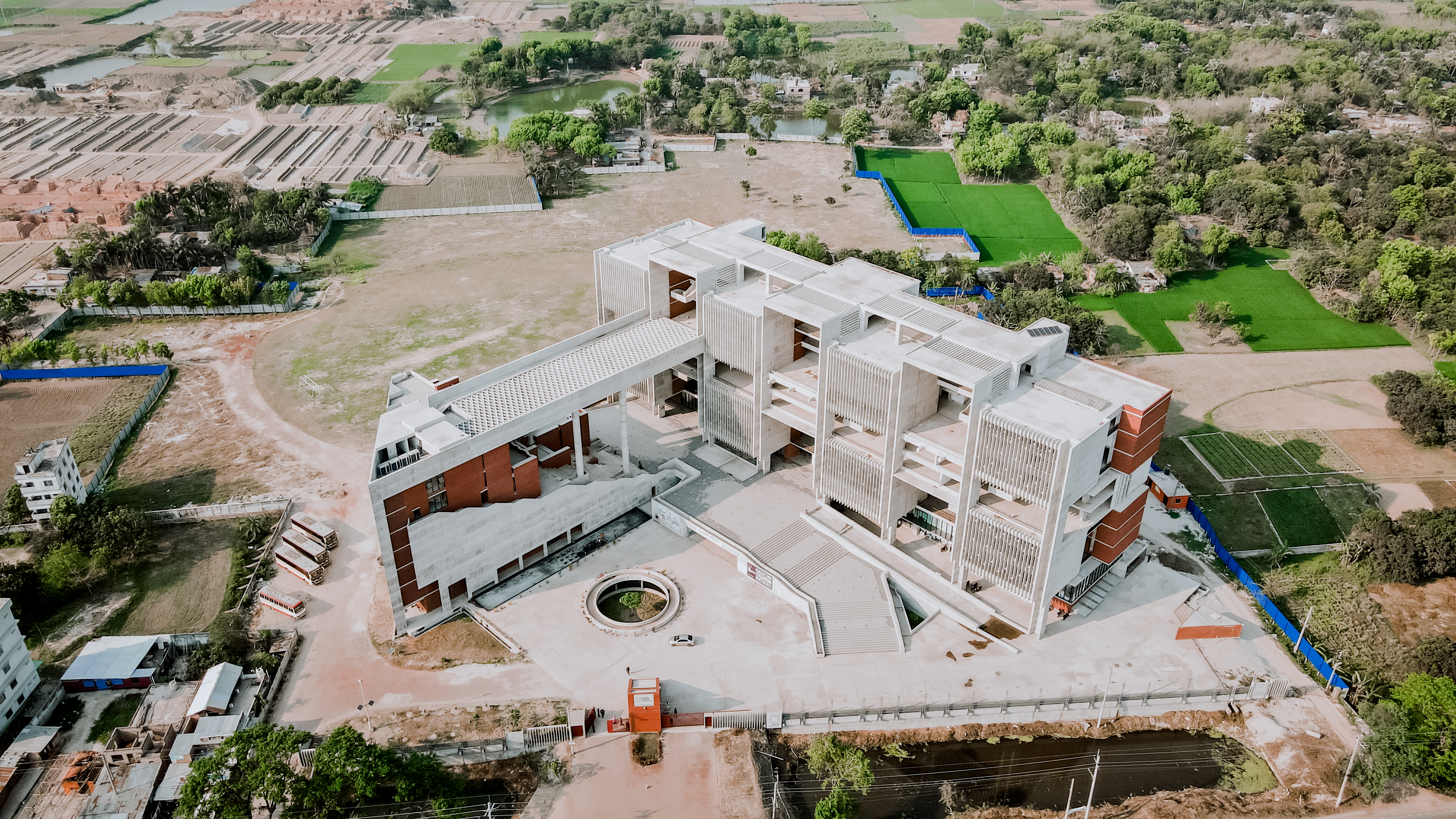
Varendra University Campus

University rankings

Regional – Overall
- QS Asia: 1401-1500 (2026)

Varendra University (VU) is a private university in Rajshahi, Bangladesh. It obtained approval from the Ministry of Education on March 14, 2012, and from the University Grants Commission (UGC) on March 20, 2012, under the Private University Act of 1992 and was the first UGC approved private university in Rajshahi. The founder is Hafizur Rahman Khan, Chairman VU Trust.

== Schools ==
There are 13 departments under four schools:

=== School of Engineering ===
- Department of Computer Science and Engineering(CSE)
- Department of Electrical and Electronic Engineering(EEE)
- Department of Nutrition and Food Engineering (NFE)

=== School of Science and Technology ===
- Department of Pharmacy
- Department of Public Health

=== School of Business and Law ===
- Department of Business Administration
- Department of Law & Human Rights

=== School of Arts and Social Science ===
- Department of English
- Department of Economics
- Department of Sociology
- Department of Journalism, Communication and Media Studies
- Department of Political Science
- Department of Islamic History and Culture

== Online admission ==
The university facilitates online admission for the benefit of applicants from distant areas.

== Campus ==
The permanent campus of Varendra University is situated at Chandrima, Paba, Rajshahi.

=== Facilities ===
Air-conditioned classrooms with multimedia, broadband and Wi-Fi, UGC Digital Library, informative website, Education ERP, CCTV security system, generators, and water filters.

=== Library ===
Varendra University now has one central library located at the main campus, replacing the previous five. This modern, expanded facility holds around 7,000 books and provides students with the resources needed to complete assignments and coursework effectively.

== Board of trustees ==
Name	Position
Hafizur Rahman Khan	Chairman
Md. Mozammel Hossain	Vice-Chairman
A.K.M Kamruzzaman Khan	General Secretary
Md. Jahurul Alam	Treasurer
Mohammad Ali Deen	Member
Mr. Toslim Uddin Ahmed	Member
Qamrun Rahman Khan	Member
Sabrina Bari	Member
Runner Automobiles PLC	Member

== Extra-curricular activities ==
Study tours, seminars, debates and contests, participation in national and international, competitions, career center, parents' day, social awareness activities for deprived people, observance of national days and celebrations, picnic, indoor/outdoor games, cultural program.
