= Rajshahi District =

Rajshahi District রাজশাহী জেলা
- District of Bangladesh
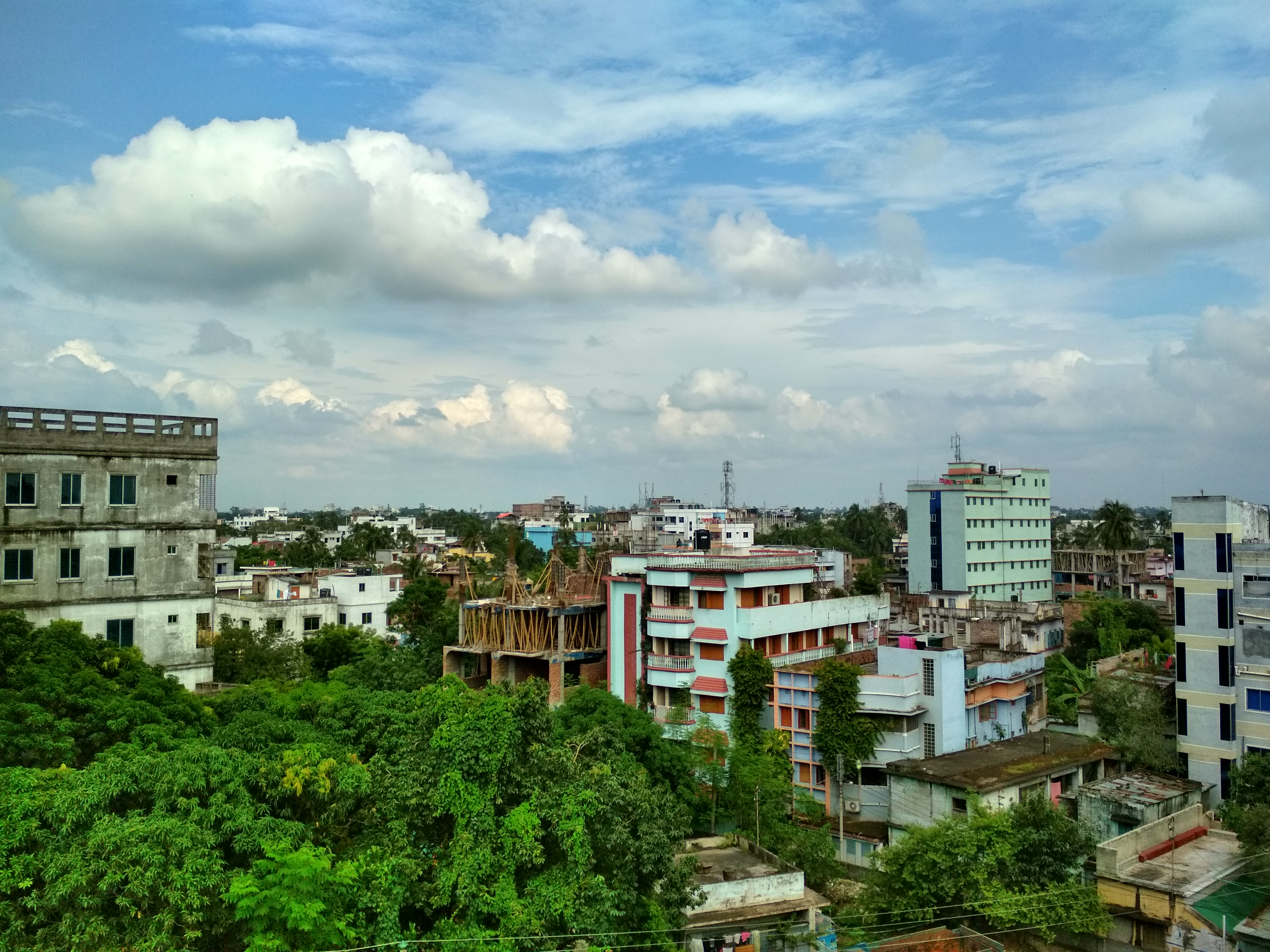
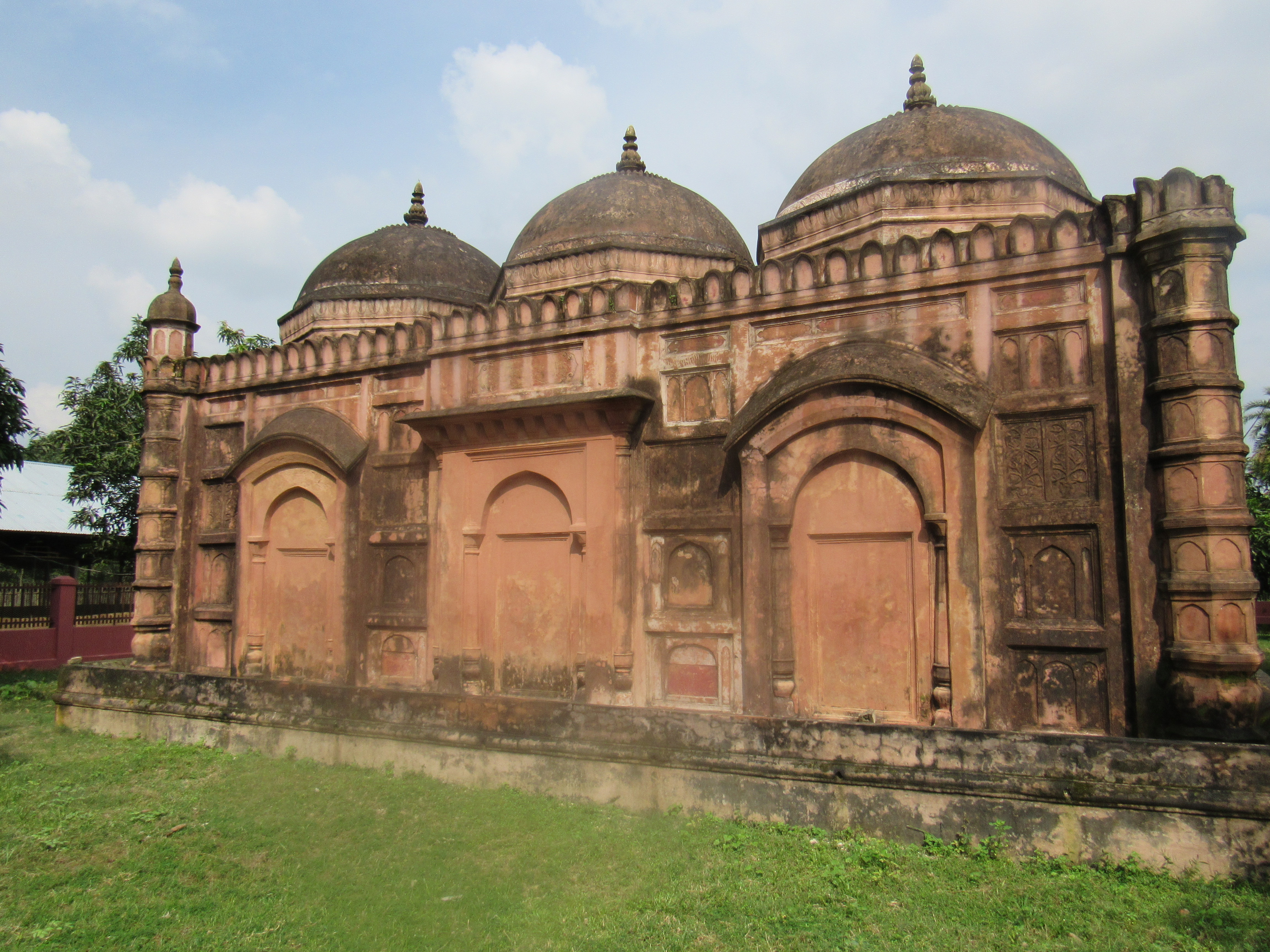
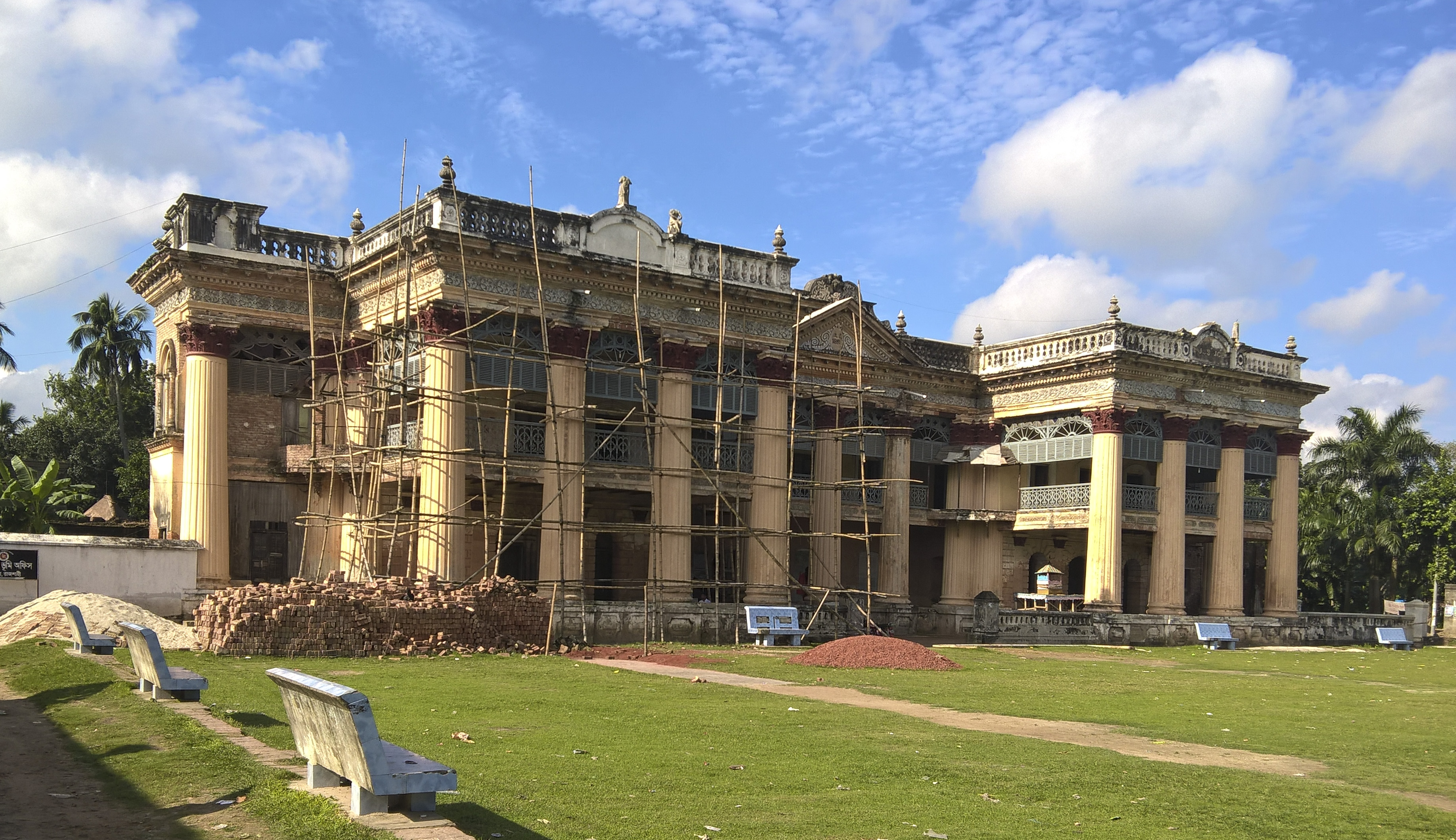
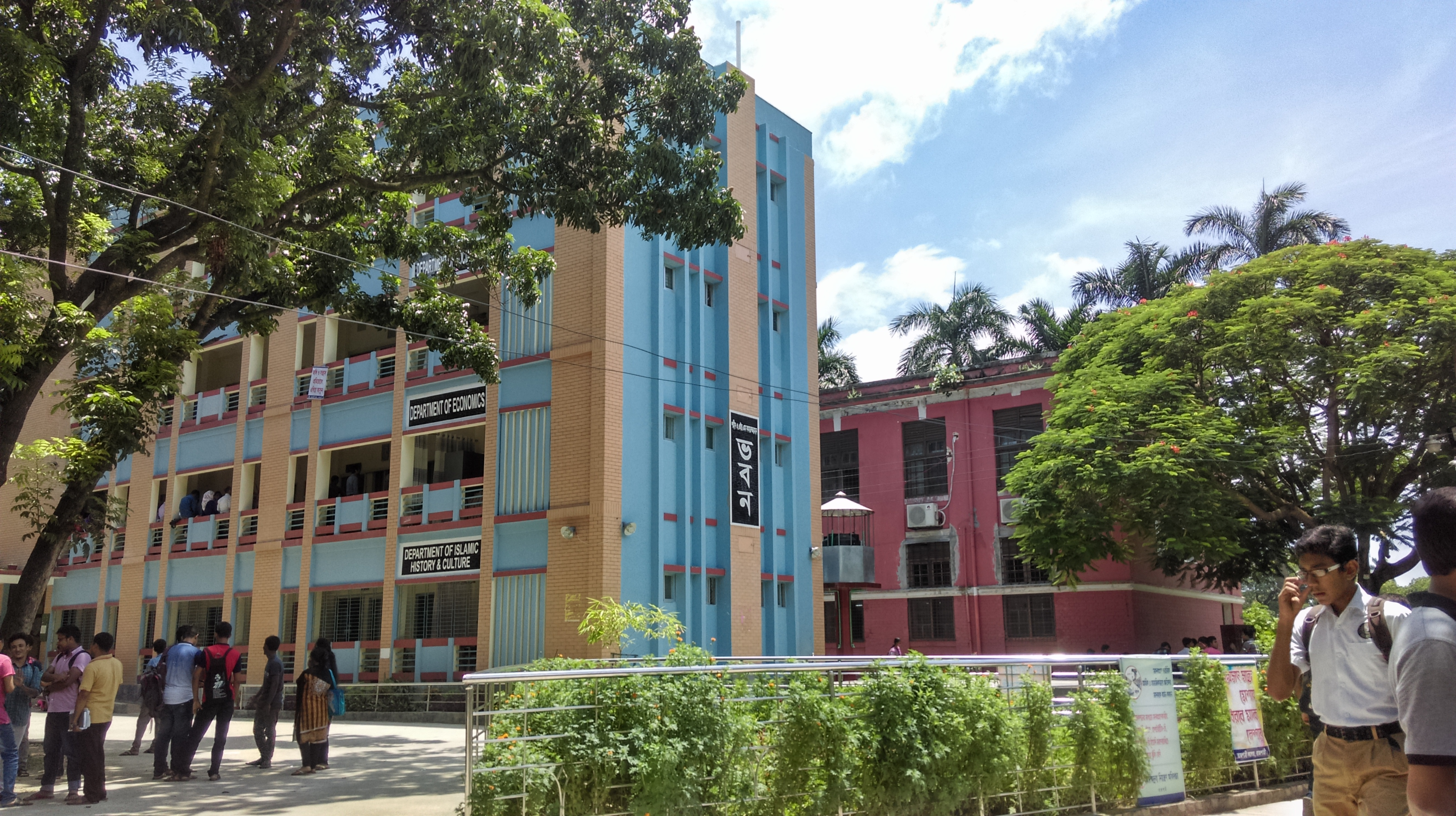
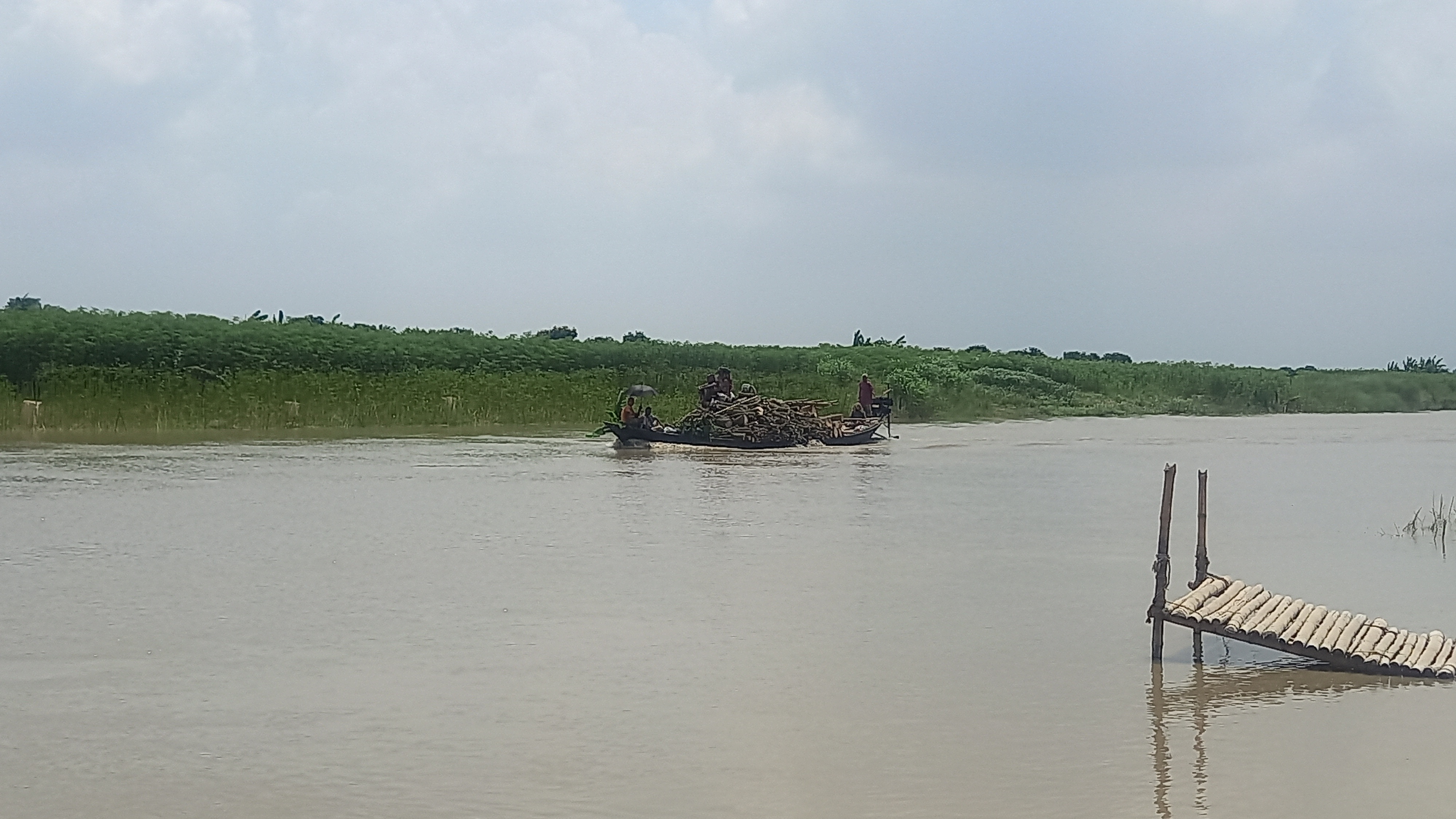
- Clockwise from top-left: Aerial view of Rajshahi, Kismat Maria Mosque, Rajshahi College, Padma River near Rajshahi, Puthia Rajbari

- Location of Rajshahi District in Bangladesh
- Expandable map of Rajshahi District
- Coordinates: 24.40°N 88.50°E
- Country: Bangladesh
- Division: Rajshahi Division
- Headquarters: Rajshahi

Government
  - Deputy Commissioner: Abdul Jalil
  - District Council Chairman: Muhammad Ali Sarkar
  - Chief Executive Officer: A. B. M. Sharif Uddin

Area
  - Total: 2,425.37 km^{2} (936.44 sq mi)

Population (2022)
  - Total: 2,915,009
  - Density: 1,208/km^{2} (3,130/sq mi)
- Time zone: UTC+06:00 (BST)
- Postal code: 6000
- Area code: 0721
- ISO 3166 code: BD-54
- HDI (2019): 0.642 medium · 6th of 20
- Website: rajshahi.gov.bd

Rajshahi District (Bengali: রাজশাহী জেলা) is a district in mid-western Bangladesh. It is a part of Rajshahi Division. The metropolitan city of Rajshahi is in Rajshahi District.

== Name and Etymology ==
Name Rajshahi encompasses two terms Sanskrit Raj and Persian Shahi. Historian Bolch Mann thinks that, this term is evoled from Zaminder of Vaturia, Raja Ganesha. But Beveridge discards Bolch Mann by mentioning that Rajshahi is not an ancient term and Vaturia is far away from Rajshahi. According to W W Hunter, name Rajshahi is evolved from Raja Ramjiban of Natore. Some historians say that Murshid Quli Khan named Rajshahi and was handed over to Raja Uday Narayan to collect taxes. Akshay Kumar Maitreya and Grant penned that, Zamaindari of Rani Bhabani of Natore was attributed as Rajshahi.

== Geography ==
Rajshahi District is bounded by Naogaon District to the north, Natore District to the east, Chapai Nababganj District to west and a small part of Kushtia District and the river Padma to the south. The district consists of alluvial plain.

=== Rivers ===
There are ten rivers in this district, totaling 146 km in length. The main river is the Padma (Ganges). Other rivers include Mahananda, Baral and Barnai.

== History ==
The Mughal Emperor Akbar appointed the Puṭhia Raj family to govern the Rajshahi region under the governor "Pitambar".

In 1772, the Rajshahi District was established. Parts of it eventually became the districts of Bogura, Malda, Natore, Naogaon, Nawabganj, and Pabna. On 1 April 1876, Rajshahi town was made as a municipal town.

During the Bangladesh War of Independence in 1971, the town was the site of battles between the Mukti Bahini and the Pakistan Army. Between 26 and 30 March, Pakistan forces killed 31 people in Godagari upazila. A battle on 30 March resulted in the death of an East Pakistan Rifles member. On 13 April, the Pakistan army killed Rajshahi Cadet College Professor AB Siddiqi. On 24 May, it attacked Tahirpur Haṭ in Bagmara upazila, killing 25 people. Mukti Bahini commander Havilder Shafiq led an attack on a Pakistani boat on 8 August, killing 18 personnel. Pakistan then killed two members of East Pakistan Ansar and established a camp in the Zoha Hall of Rajshahi University, where they massacred hundreds of civilians. The Pakistan army also established camps inside Rajshahi Cadet College, Roy Saheb brickfield, Sardaha Pilot School, and Sardah Police Academy. It tortured militants of Mukti Bahini and civilians in the camps, and killed hundreds of refugees on the banks of the Padma river who were fleeing to India. In a battle between Mukti Bahini and Pakistan near Kabasmul, a Pakistani army major was killed. Pakistan retaliated by killing 44 civilians in Gaganbari and Palsa. On 17 December, Pakistan surrendered to the Indian Army Captain Nanda in Naṭore, a day after its forces signed the Pakistani instrument of Surrender in Dhaka. Its camp in Rajshahi University was taken over by Mukti Bahini members, On 18 December, the Pakistan army stationed in Pabna and Rajshahi districts surrendered. Surrender ceremonies took place on 20 December.

Rajshahi town was upgraded to a municipal corporation on 13 August 1987. In 1997, the government of Bangladesh made the town into a full city corporation, Rajshahi City Corporation. In 2016, Rezaul Karim Siddiquee, a professor at University of Rajshahi, and a 65 year old Sufi preacher, Shahidullah, were killed by Islamic extremists.

== Demographics ==
Historical population
Year	Pop.	±% p.a.
1981	1,540,085	—
1991	1,887,015	+2.05%
2001	2,286,874	+1.94%
2011	2,595,197	+1.27%
2022	2,915,009	+1.06%

According to the 2022 Census of Bangladesh, Rajshahi District has 775,245 households and a population of 2,915,009 with an average 3.67 people per household. Among the population, 455,892 (15.64%) inhabitants are under 10 years of age. The population density is 1,202 people per km^{2}. Rajshahi District has a literacy rate (age 7 and over) of 75.17%, compared to the national average of 74.80%, and a sex ratio of 100.25 males per 100 females. Approximately, 37.58% (1,095,403) of the population live in urban areas. Ethnic population is 47,832 (1.64%), of which 26,224 are Santal, 8,048 Oraon and 3,274 Mal Paharia.

Religions in Rajshahi District (2022)
Religion	Percent
Islam	94.00%
Hinduism	4.58%
Christianity	1.20%
Other or not stated	0.22%

Religion in present-day Rajshahi District
Religion	1941 (Note: Sadar subdivision of Rajshahi district)		1981		1991		2001		2011		2022	
Religion	Pop.	%	Pop.	%	Pop.	%	Pop.	%	Pop.	%	Pop.	%
Islam	435,829	75.18%	1,417,542	92.04%	1,748,741	92.68%	2,136,702	93.43%	2,430,194	93.64%	2,740,180	94.00%
Hinduism	111,991	19.32%	89,670	5.82%	107,617	5.70%	112,643	4.93%	122,394	4.72%	133,514	4.58%
Tribal religion	31,439	5.42%	—N/a	—N/a	—N/a	—N/a	—N/a	—N/a	—N/a	—N/a	—N/a	—N/a
Christianity	216	0.04%	4,746	0.31%	10,191	0.54%	22,765	1.00%	27,830	1.07%	34,881	1.20%
Others (Note: Including Jainism, Buddhism, Zoroastrianism, Judaism, Ad-Dharmis, or not stated)	258	0.04%	28,127	1.83%	20,466	1.08%	14,764	0.65%	14,779	0.57%	6,158	0.22%
Total Population	579,733	100%	1,540,085	100%	1,887,015	100%	2,286,874	100%	2,595,197	100%	2,915,009	100%

Muslims are the majority population and Hindus are the largest minority. The Christian population has grown quickly, while the number of those following ethnic religions has declined significantly.

== Administration ==
Rajshahi District upazila geocode map

Sub-district or upazilas and thanas of Rajshahi are

- Bagha Upazila
- Bagmara Upazila
- Charghat Upazila
- Durgapur Upazila
- Godagari Upazila
- Mohanpur Upazila
- Paba Upazila
- Puthia Upazila
- Tanore Upazila
- Boalia Thana
- Matihar Thana
- Rajpara Thana
- Shah Makdam Thana
- Chandrima Thana
- Katakhali Thana
- Belpukur Thana
- Airport Thana
- Kashiadanga Thana
- Kornohar Thana
- Damkura Thana

== Communications ==
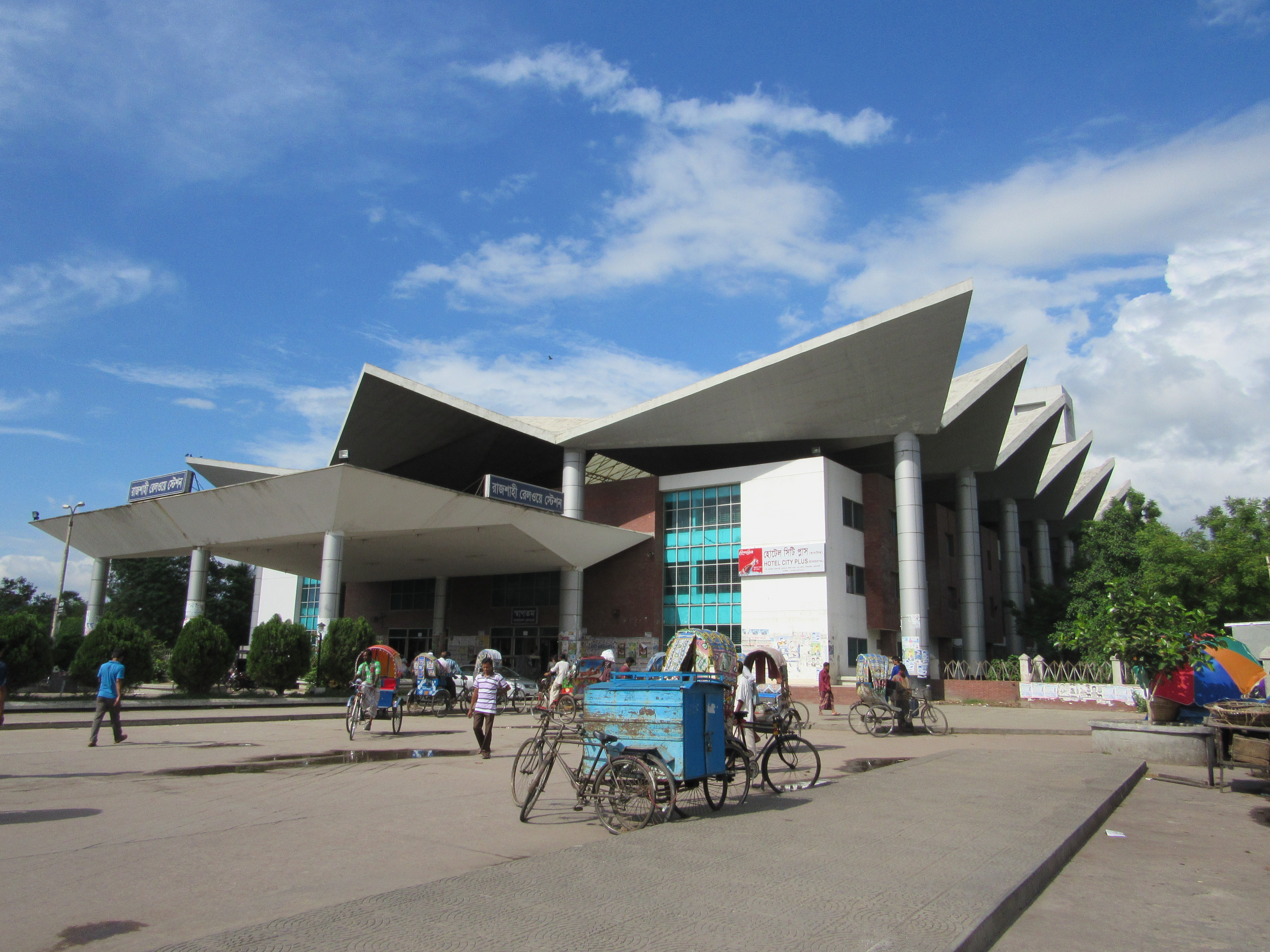
Rajshahi railway station

Rajshahi district has well organized internal communication as well as connection to other parts of Bangladesh. There are 96 metalled roads with a total length of about 1270 km, 108 semi-metalled roads of about 546 km length, and six railways of about 63 km total length.

=== Media and press club ===
There are Govt. Approved Bengali daily newspapers and Newsportals Published from the city, including Sonali Sangbad, Sunshine, Dainik Barta, Uttorbongo Protidin, Sonar Desh, Natun Provat, and Amader Rajshahi.

The government-run Bangladesh Television and Bangladesh Betar have transmission centres in Rajshahi.

A local FM radio station, Radio Padma, transmits at 99.2 MHz frequency. Radio Foorti transmits at 88.0 MHz.

Rajshahi City Press Club, Rajshahi Press Club, Rajshahi Metropolitan Press club and Rajshahi Padma Press Club.

== Economy ==
Rajshahi Metropolitan is widely known as Silk City of Bangladesh, the Bangladesh Sericulture Development Board is situated at Rajshahi. There are seven silk factories in the BSCIC Industrial Town in Rajshahi. An inter-city train is named Silk City Express after Rajshahi; it serves the route between Rajshahi and Dhaka. Rajshahi is also notable for producing mangos and silk.

== Points of interest ==
- Bagdhani Mosque
- Bagha Mosque
- Kismat Maria Mosque
- Tomb of Shah Makhdum
- Tomb of Shah Sultan
- Talando Shiv Mandir
- Puthia Temple Complex
- Boro Kuthi

== See also ==
- Districts of Bangladesh
- Upazila
- Divisions of Bangladesh
- Administrative geography of Bangladesh
- Faridpur District
- Rajbari District
- Upazila
- Thana
