= Rajshahi Government Girls' High School =

Coordinates: 24.3724°N 88.5690°E

Rajshahi government girl's high school
- রাজশাহী সরকারি বালিকা উচ্চ বিদ্যালয়
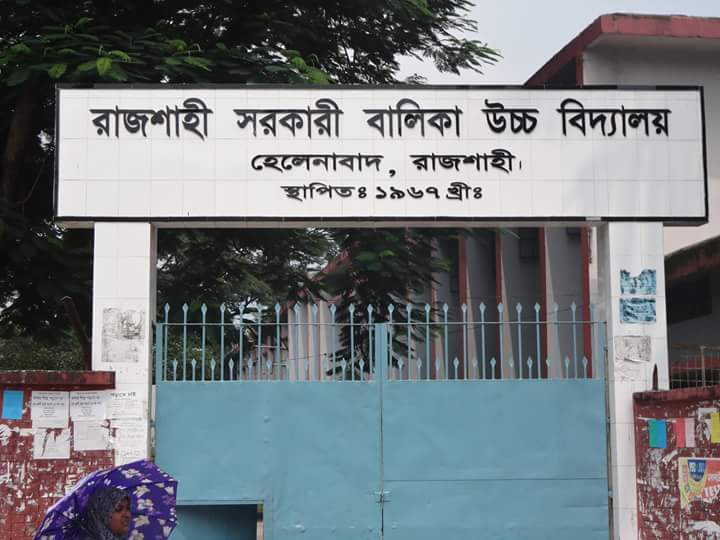
- Helanabad; Rajshahi, Bangladesh

Information
- School type: Government
- Established: 1 January 1967
- Principal: Tawhid Ara

Rajshahi Government Girls' High School is a government-sponsored independent secondary school for girls, located in Rajpara Thana, Rajshahi, Bangladesh. It was founded in 1967.

The school has obtained good results in Secondary School Certificate (SSC) exams. In 2015, 222 students scored GPA-5 in the SSC exams. Rajshahi Government Girls' High School has earned the third position in the Rajshahi district by earning 89.345 points.

== History ==
On 1 January 1967, Alhaj Atiman Nesha, a resident of Jessore, joined as the headmistress. He lived in Helenabad Government Colony before the establishment of the school. Mrs. Mumtaz Jahan, Ashwini Kumar Shah and Hasina Rahman joined as Assistant Teachers on 15 February 1987. All four were founding teachers. There were two peons named Md. Ashraf and Mungli (Santal). The school started its journey from 6th to 8th class in March 1967.
