= Boalia Thana =

Thana in Rajshahi Division, Bangladesh

Boalia বোয়ালিয়া
- Location in Bangladesh Boalia (Bangladesh)
- Coordinates: 24°22.2′N 88°36.3′E
- Country: Bangladesh
- Division: Rajshahi Division
- District: Rajshahi District

Area
  - Total: 31.69 km^{2} (12.24 sq mi)

Population (2022)
  - Total: 213,467
  - Density: 3,042/km^{2} (7,880/sq mi)
- Time zone: UTC+6 (BST)
- Postal code: 6000
- Area code: 0721
- Website: bangladesh.gov.bd/maps/images/rajshahi/Boalia.gif

Boalia (Bengali: বোয়ালিয়া) is a thana under Rajshahi Metropolitan Police in Rajshahi Division, Bangladesh.

== Geography ==
Boalia is located at 24.3694°N 88.6042°E. It has 51063 households and a total area of 96.68 km^{2}.

== Demographics ==
Religions in Boalia Thana (2022)
Religion	Percent
Islam	91.88%
Hinduism	7.85%
Other or not stated	0.27%

According to the 2022 Bangladeshi census, Boalia Thana had 51,379 households and a population of 213,467. 5.65% of the population were under 5 years of age. Boalia had a literacy rate (age 7 and over) of 91.58%: 93.27% for males and 89.78% for females, and a sex ratio of 106.29 males for every 100 females.

According to the 2011 Census of Bangladesh, Boalia had a population of 221,163. Males constituted 51.73% of the population and females constituted 48.27%. Muslims formed 93.21% of the population, Hindus 6.59%, Christians 0.18% and others were 0.02%. Boalia had a literacy rate of 76.37% for the population age 7 and above.

In 1991, Boalia had a population of 294,056. Males constituted 52.53% of the population and females 47.47%. This upazila's eighteen up population was 165,335. Boalia had an average literacy rate of 58.3% (7+ years), and the national average of 32.4% literate.

== Administration ==
Boalia Thana has 30 unions/wards and 82 mauzas/mahallas.

== Education ==
There are 13 colleges in the thana: Alhaj Sujauddula College, Bangabandhu Degree College, Barendra College, Madar Bux Home Economics College, Mahanagar Mahabiddyalaya, Rajshahi College, Rajshahi Government City College, Rajshahi Government Women's College, Shah Mokhdum College, Shahid A.H.M. Kamaruzzaman Govt. Degree College, Upashahar Women's College, Waymark Ideal College, and Wisdom Standard College.

According to Banglapedia, Government P. N. Girls' High School, founded in 1886, is a notable secondary school.

== See also ==
- Upazilas of Bangladesh
- Districts of Bangladesh
- Divisions of Bangladesh
- Administrative geography of Bangladesh
