= Rajpara Thana =

Rajpara রাজপাড়া
- Thana
- Location in Bangladesh Rajpara (Bangladesh)
- Coordinates: 24°22.5′N 88°34.8′E
- Country: Bangladesh
- Division: Rajshahi Division
- District: Rajshahi District

Area
  - Total: 25.19 km^{2} (9.73 sq mi)

Population (2022)
  - Total: 116,778
  - Density: 4,807/km^{2} (12,450/sq mi)
- Time zone: UTC+6 (BST)
- Postal code: 6201
- Area code: 0721

Rajpara (Bengali: রাজপাড়া) is a thana of Rajshahi District in Rajshahi, Bangladesh.

== Demographics ==
Religions in Rajpara Thana (2022)
Religion	Percent
Islam	94.05%
Hinduism	4.94%
Christianity	0.92%
Other or not stated	0.08%

According to the 2022 Bangladeshi census, Rajpara Thana had 29,230 households and a population of 116,778. 7.14% of the population were under 5 years of age. Rajpara had a literacy rate (age 7 and over) of 90.61%: 91.85% for males and 89.32% for females, and a sex ratio of 103.78 males for every 100 females.

According to the 2011 Census of Bangladesh, Rajpara had a population of 137,318 (males 51.23%, females 48.77). Muslims were 93.68% of the population, Hindus 4.50%, Christians 0.97% and others 0.85%. Rajpara had a literacy rate of 73.92% for the population 7 years and above.

In 2001, Rajpara had an average literacy rate of 69.70% (7+ years) compared with the national average of 32.4%.

== Administration ==
Rajpara has 10 unions/wards and 46 mauzas/mahallas.

== Education ==
=== Secondary schools ===
There are 28 secondary schools in the thana. They include:

- Balajan Nessa Girls High School
- Court Model High School
- Golzar Bag High School
- Government Laboratory High School Rajshahi
- Laxmipur Girls High School
- Mahish Bathan Adarsha Uchcha Balika Bhiddyalay
- Mission Girls High School
- Rajshahi Court Academy
- Rajshahi Government Girls' High School
- Rajshahi Government Madrasha
- Rajshahi Medical College Campus High School
- River View Collectorate School Rajshahi
- Shimul Memorial North South School

== See also ==
- Upazilas of Bangladesh
- Districts of Bangladesh
- Divisions of Bangladesh
- Administrative geography of Bangladesh
