= Rajshahi =

Metropolitan city in North-Western Bangladesh

Rajshahi রাজশাহী (Bengali)
- Metropolis
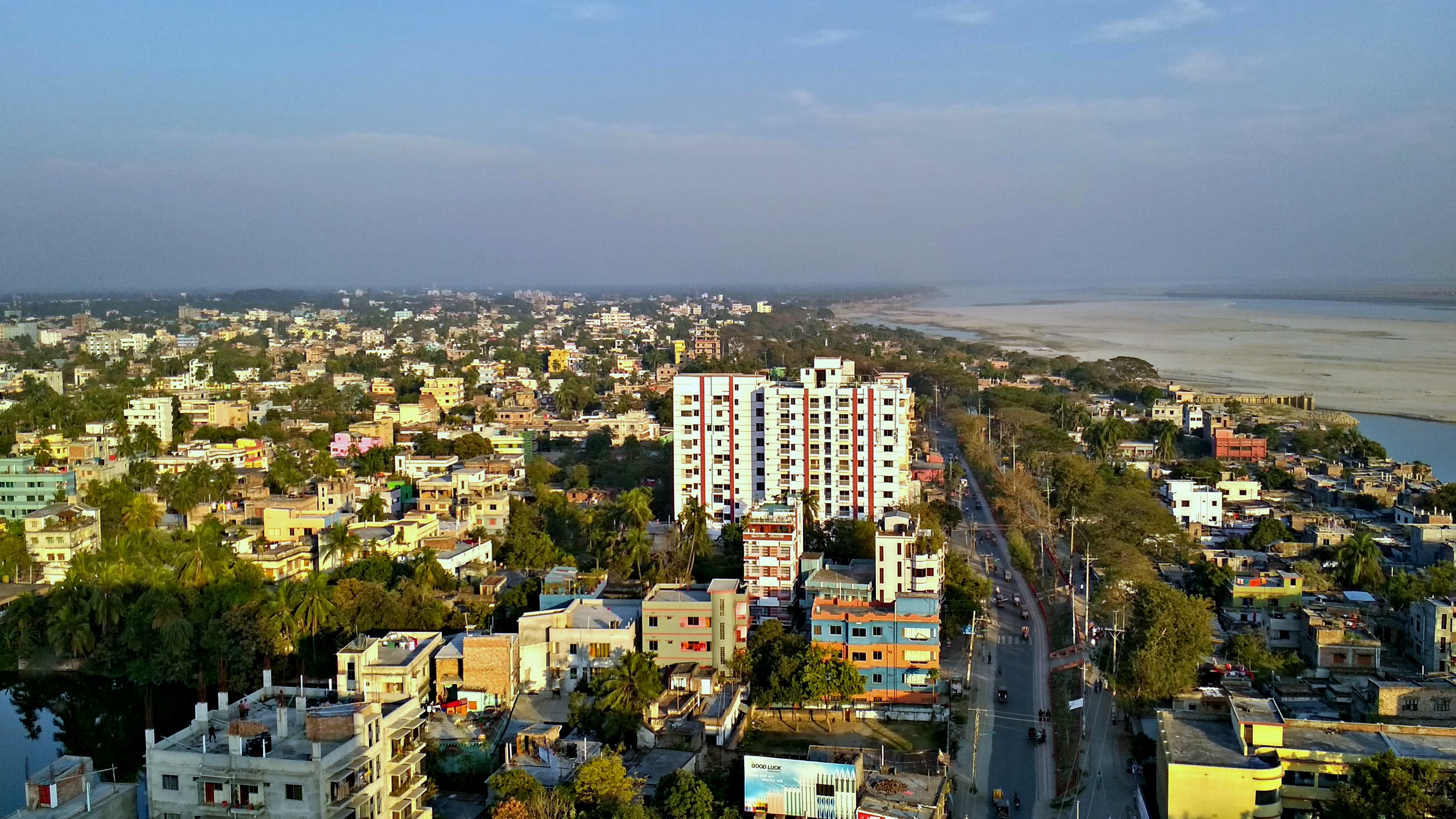
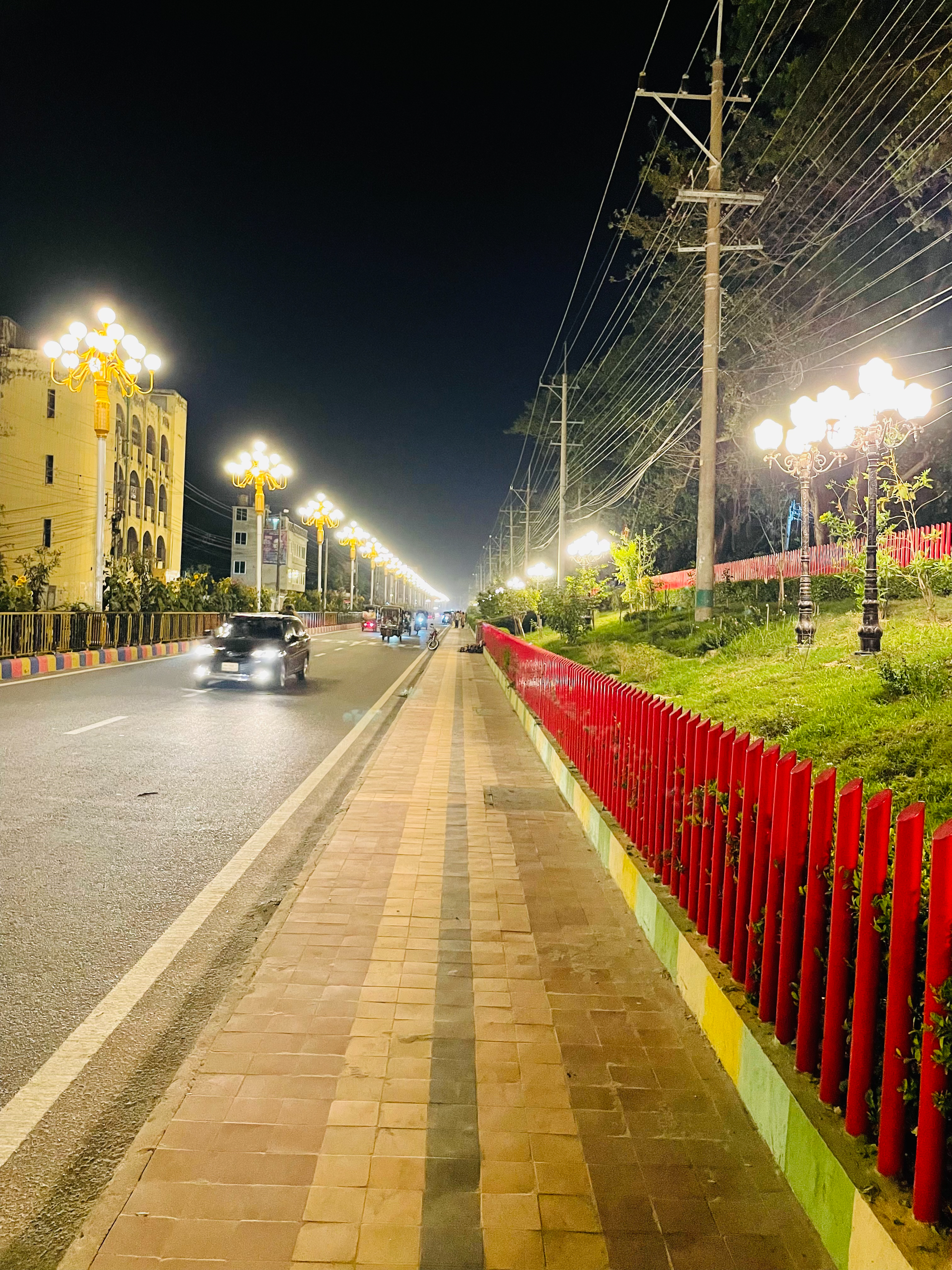
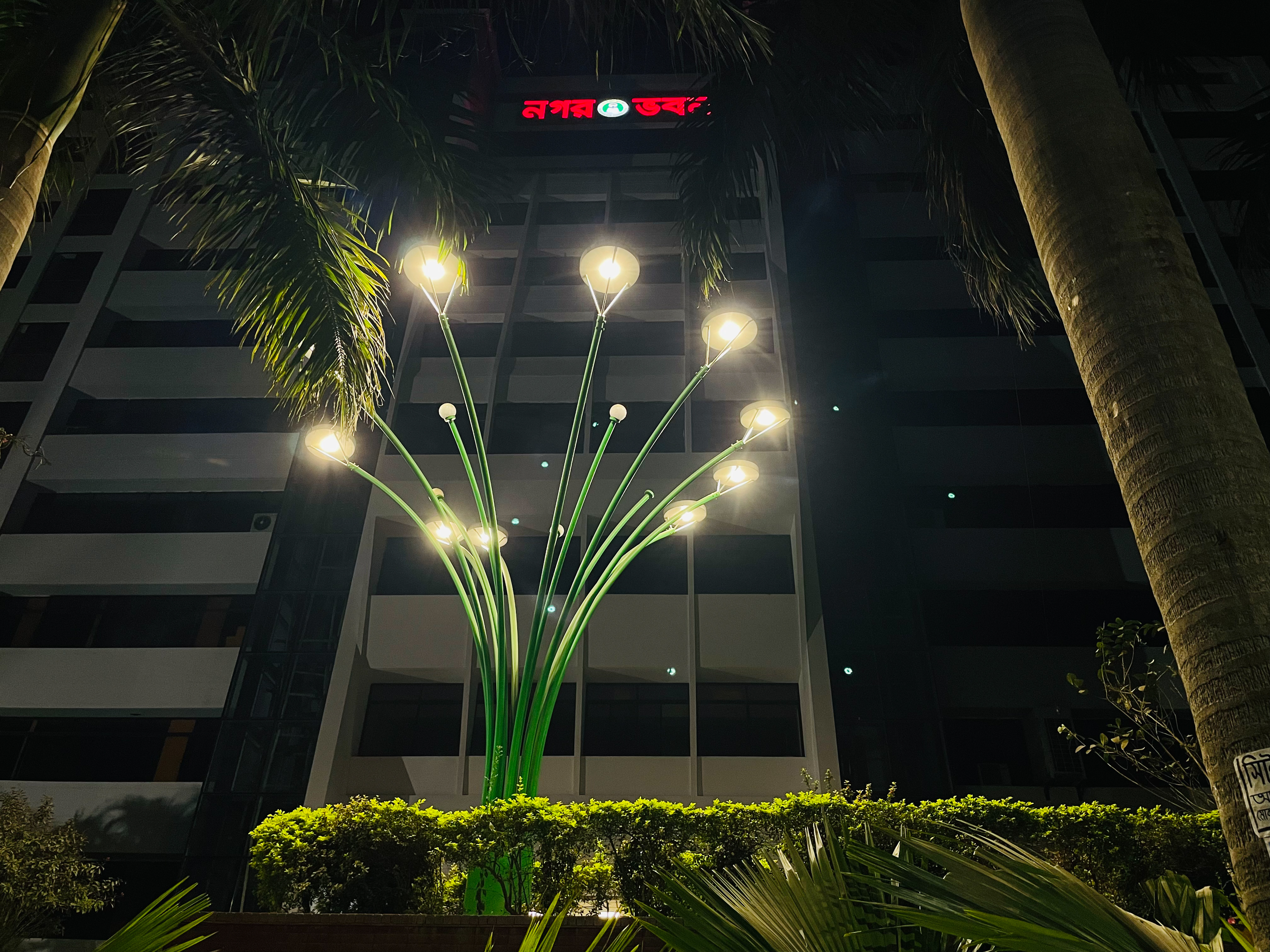
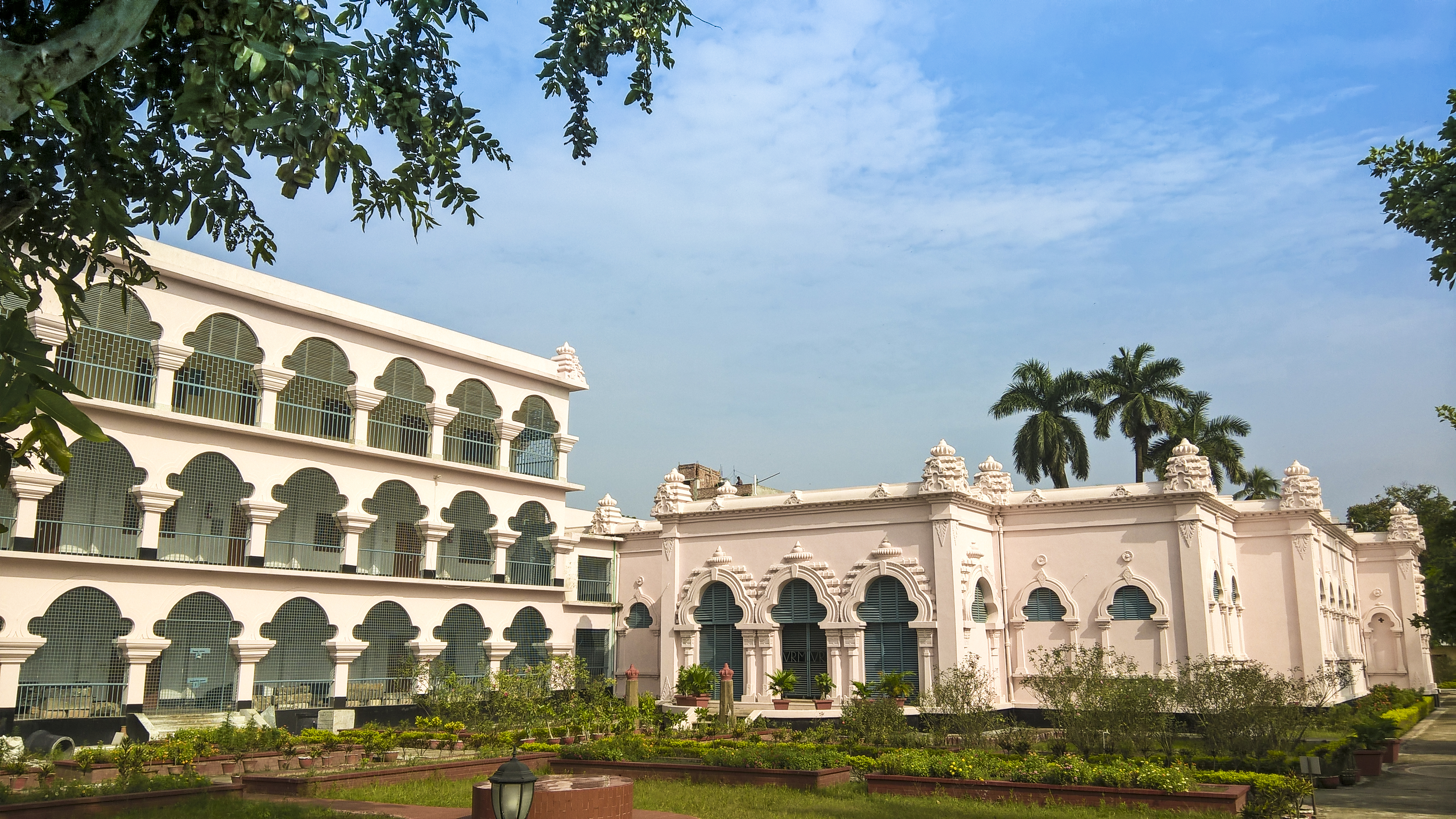
- Skyline of Rajshahi City Rajshahi at night Nagar Bhabon Rajshahi Varendra Research Museum
- Nicknames: Education City, Silk City
- Interactive map outlining Rajshahi
- Location in Rajshahi Division Location in Bangladesh Location in South Asia Location in Asia Location on Earth
- Coordinates: 24.3745°N 88.6042°E
- Country: Bangladesh
- Division: Rajshahi
- District: Rajshahi
- Establishment: 1634
- Municipality: 1876
- Granted city status: 1991

Government
  - Type: Mayor-Council
  - Body: Rajshahi City Corporation
  - Administrator: Mahfuzur Rahman
  - City Council: 30 constituencies
  - Parliament: 1 constituencies

Area
  - Urban: 121 km^{2} (47 sq mi)
  - Metro: 377.1 km^{2} (145.6 sq mi)
- Elevation: 23 m (75 ft)

Population (2022)
  - Urban: 552,791
  - Urban density: 4,570/km^{2} (11,800/sq mi)
  - Metro: 1,032,000
  - Metro density: 2,737/km^{2} (7,088/sq mi)
  - Metro rank: 4th in Bangladesh
- Demonym: Rajshahian

Languages
  - Official: Bengali • English
  - Regional: North Central Bengali
- Time zone: UTC+6 (BST)
- Postal code: 6000, 6100, 620x
- National calling code: +880
- National Calling Code: +880
- HDI (2023): 0.700 high · 6th of 22
- Website: erajshahi.portal.gov.bd

Rajshahi (Bengali: রাজশাহী, pronounced [radʒ.ʃaɦi]) is a metropolitan city and a major urban, administrative, commercial and educational centre of Bangladesh. It is also the administrative seat of the eponymous division and district. It is also the largest city of North Bengal. Located on the north bank of the Padma River, near the Bangladesh–India border, the city is surrounded by the satellite towns of Nowhata and Katakhali of Paba Upazila, which together form an urban agglomeration of about 1 million population.

Rajshahi is a historic center of silk production. Varendra Research Museum, the oldest of its kind in Bangladesh, is located in the city. Sometimes the city is referred to as the City of Education, on account of being home to many renowned educational institutions of Bangladesh. The head office of Rajshahi Agricultural Development Bank and Barind Multipurpose Development Authority is situated in the city. The Shah Makhdum Airport and Rajshahi railway station serves Rajshahi.

According to The Guardian, Rajshahi is the cleanest city of Bangladesh, and it is also the most environmentally friendly city in the country.

== History ==
Modern Rajshahi lies in the ancient region of Pundravardhana. The foundation of the city dates to 1634, according to epigraphic records at the mausoleum of Sufi saint Shah Makhdum. The area hosted a Dutch settlement in the 18th century.

Rajshahi district was a part of the Pundra region of ancient Bengal ruled by the Pundra Kingdom. The capital of Prince Vijaya, the king who led military operations in Sri Lanka and Southeast Asia was located 14 kilometres (9 mi) to the west of Rajshahi town. Rajshahi was dominated by various Maharajas, Rajas and Zamindars. During Deo Raja's period, the region was known as Mohakalgarh. In 1288-89 the Raja was defeated by Shah Makhdum Rupos. The administrative district was established in 1772 and the municipal corporation during the British Raj in 1876.

Its wealth peaked under the Pala Empire, when the Barind area became an important agricultural and cultural zone. In the Mughal period, the area gained further prominence for its silk production. Rajshahi Raj was the largest zamindari (feudatory kingdom) during the British Raj which occupied a vast position of Bengal. When Nawab Murshid Quli Khan divided the Bengal Subah into 13 divisions in 1717, Rajshahi was included as one of the divisions .

During the British raj, it was also known as "Beuleah" and was the administrative headquarters of the Rajshahi district in Eastern Bengal and Assam. It was originally chosen as a commercial factory for the silk trade, which was being officially encouraged by the agricultural department of that time. The town contained a government college and an industrial school for sericulture. Most of the public buildings were severely damaged by the earthquake of 12 June 1897. Throughout much of the early part of the twentieth century there was a daily steamer service on the Ganges which connected it to rail-heads that led to the then provincial capital of Calcutta as well as other cities in the province of Bengal.

Rajshahi was made a city corporation in 1991.

=== Etymology ===
The region came to be known as Rampur Boalia after the establishment of an administrative office in 1825. The origin of the present name of "Rajshahi" is debated among scholars. Most say that it takes its name from Hindu Kings Rajshahi Raj (or "Rajas") as Raj and the persianised Shahi; both of which mean "royal" or "kingdom".

== Geography ==
=== Topography ===
Geographically Rajshahi is situated within Barind Tract, 23 m (75 ft) above sea level, and lies at 24°22′26″N 88°36′04″E. The city is located on the alluvial plains of the Padma River, which runs through the southern side of the city. It is bounded on the east, north, and west by Paba Upazila (a subdivision of a district) of the district.

Rajshahi District is bounded by Naogaon District to the north, Natore District to the east, and Chapai Nawabganj District and the river Padma & Kushtia District to the south.

=== Climate ===
Under the Köppen climate classification, Rajshahi has a humid subtropical climate (Cwa), with its coldest month being below 18 °C (64 °F). The climate of Rajshahi is generally marked with monsoons, high temperature, considerable humidity and moderate rainfall. The hot season commences early in March and continues till the middle of July. The maximum mean temperature observed is about 32 to 36 °C (90 to 97 °F) during April, May, June, and July and the minimum temperature recorded in January is about 7 to 16 °C (45 to 61 °F). The highest rainfall is observed during the months of monsoon. The annual rainfall in the district is about 1,448 millimetres (57.0 in).

Climate data for Rajshahi (1991–2020 normals, extremes 1883–present)
Month	Jan	Feb	Mar	Apr	May	Jun	Jul	Aug	Sep	Oct	Nov	Dec	Year
Record high °C (°F)	31.6 (88.9)	36.8 (98.2)	40.5 (104.9)	42.7 (108.9)	45.1 (113.2)	43.6 (110.5)	39.7 (103.5)	38.3 (100.9)	37.9 (100.2)	36.5 (97.7)	34.3 (93.7)	30.3 (86.5)	45.1 (113.2)
Mean daily maximum °C (°F)	23.7 (74.7)	27.9 (82.2)	33.0 (91.4)	35.8 (96.4)	35.3 (95.5)	34.3 (93.7)	33.0 (91.4)	33.2 (91.8)	33.0 (91.4)	31.9 (89.4)	29.4 (84.9)	25.4 (77.7)	31.3 (88.3)
Daily mean °C (°F)	16.2 (61.2)	20.0 (68.0)	25.0 (77.0)	28.7 (83.7)	29.3 (84.7)	29.5 (85.1)	28.9 (84.0)	29.1 (84.4)	28.5 (83.3)	26.7 (80.1)	22.4 (72.3)	18.0 (64.4)	25.2 (77.3)
Mean daily minimum °C (°F)	10.4 (50.7)	13.4 (56.1)	18.2 (64.8)	22.9 (73.2)	24.6 (76.3)	26.0 (78.8)	26.3 (79.3)	26.4 (79.5)	25.8 (78.4)	23.1 (73.6)	17.4 (63.3)	12.7 (54.9)	20.6 (69.1)
Record low °C (°F)	3.4 (38.1)	4.6 (40.3)	8.6 (47.5)	10.8 (51.4)	14.4 (57.9)	20.3 (68.5)	19.4 (66.9)	18.3 (64.9)	15.8 (60.4)	11.4 (52.5)	7.0 (44.6)	4.2 (39.6)	3.4 (38.1)
Average precipitation mm (inches)	7 (0.3)	13 (0.5)	25 (1.0)	58 (2.3)	143 (5.6)	231 (9.1)	289 (11.4)	222 (8.7)	255 (10.0)	114 (4.5)	12 (0.5)	7 (0.3)	1,376 (54.2)
Average precipitation days (≥ 1 mm)	2	2	3	5	10	14	20	17	15	7	1	1	97
Average relative humidity (%)	78	71	63	65	75	83	87	86	86	83	78	78	78
Mean monthly sunshine hours	201.7	226.0	252.6	236.7	220.6	173.1	152.1	163.8	173.3	228.3	235.5	211.0	2,474.7
Source 1: NOAA
Source 2: Bangladesh Meteorological Department (humidity 1981-2010)

Although once noted for its air pollution, since 2014 the levels of particulates have been dramatically reduced by various efforts to switch to cleaner fuels and to battery-powered vehicles, to pave earth streets, to encourage walking and bicycle transport, and to plant vegetation. The levels of PM10 dropped by 67% and PM2.5 which are particularly harmful to human health, dropped from 70 to 37 micrograms per cubic meter between 2014 and 2016. Lowest recorded temperature in Rajshahi was 3.4 °C on 9 January 2003 and highest recorded temperature was 45.1 °C on 18 May 1972.

=== Parks and greenery ===
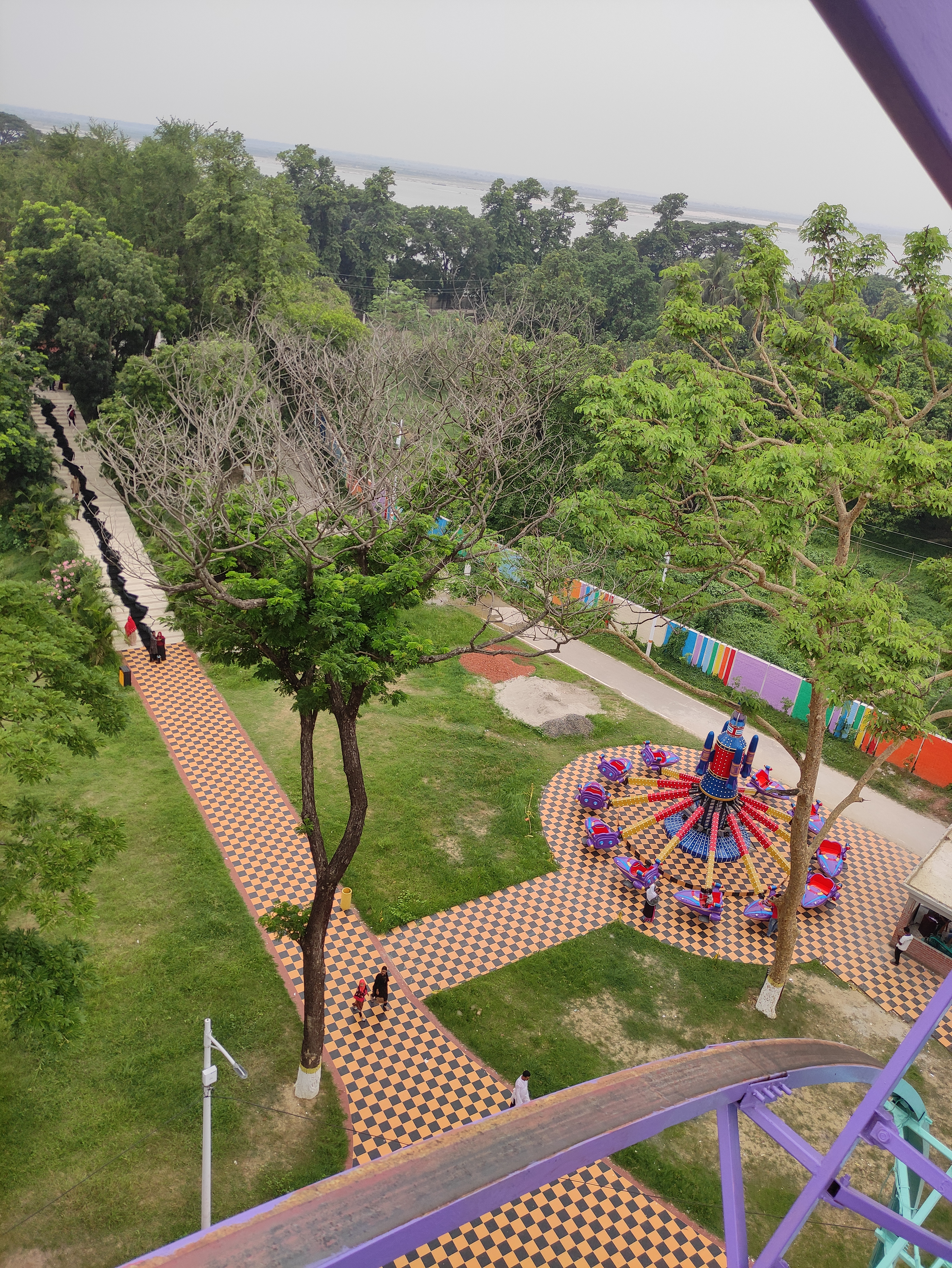
Rajshahi Central Park

Shaheed A.H.M Qamaruzzaman Central Park and Zoo is one of the popular public places in Rajshahi city. A wide area with green trees and grass houses different animal species. It is located by the bank of the Padma River. Other parks in the city are Bhubon Mohon Park and Captain Monsur Ali Park. Shahid Zia children's park is specially designed for children's amusement. The bank of the Padma River along the city is also a destination for recreation. The bank is a planned zone in many parts of the city to accommodate city dwellers for recreation purposes. In 2015, Munsguard Park near the old Dutch Boro Kuthi building and Lalonshah Park near Shahmukhdum Eidgah was built bordering the bank to provide residents a place to enjoy the views of the Padma river. The points of interest in the city include: banks of the Padma River, Varendra Research Museum, shrine of Shah Makhdum Ruposh, Shaheed A.H.M Qamaruzzaman Central Park and Zoo, University of Rajshahi, Boro Kuthi, Shahid Zia Park, and Bangabandhu Novo Theatre.

== Administration ==
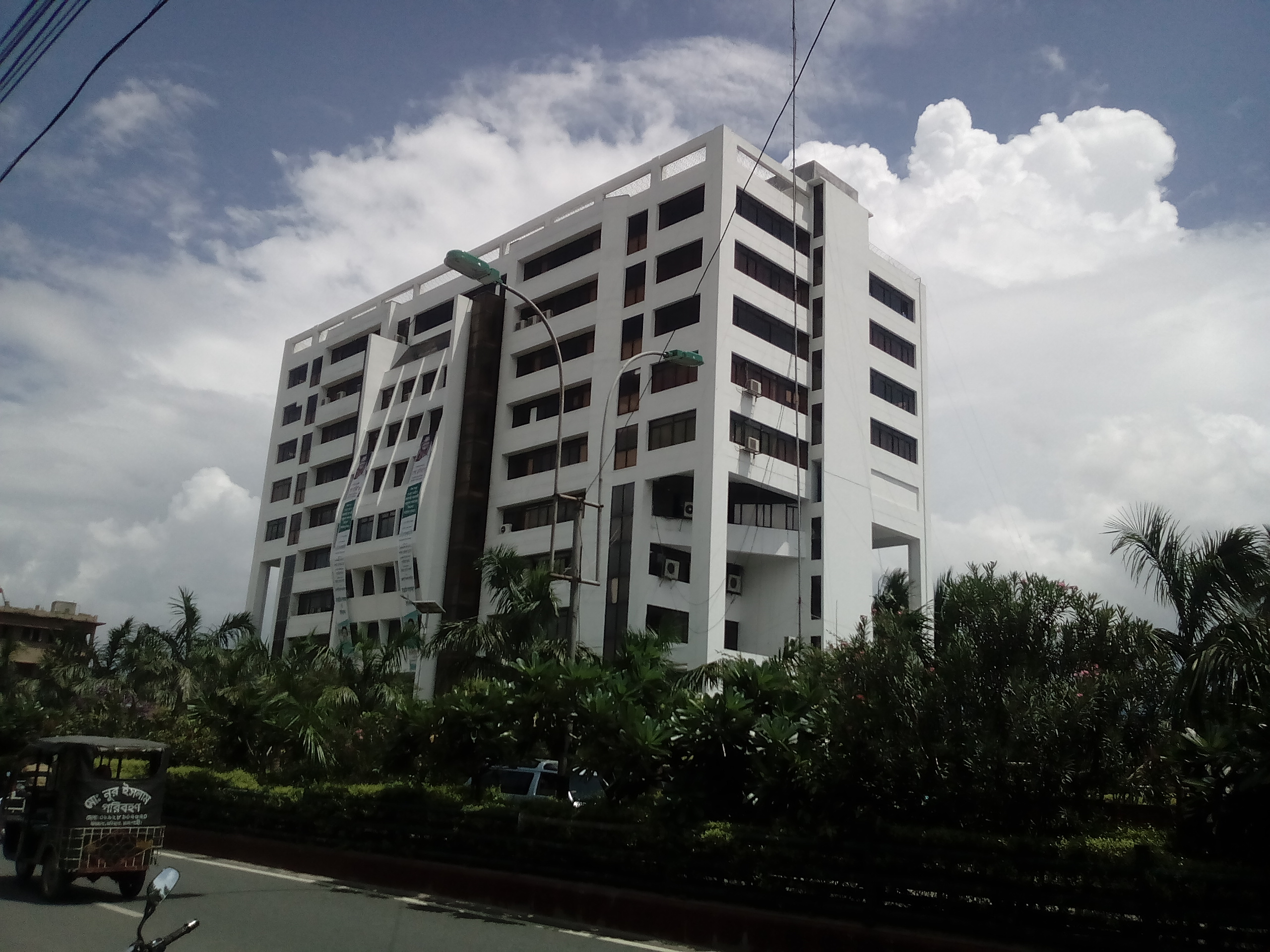
Rajshahi City Corporation headquarter

Rajshahi is the headquarters of one of the eight administrative divisions of Bangladesh. The Divisional Commissioner, who is the administrative chief of the Rajshahi Division, the DIG for the Rajshahi Division, and other divisional civil servants have their offices in the city, which function as part of the government administrative setup. Deputy Commissioner (DC) who is the administrative chief of Rajshahi District, Civil Surgeon, other district-level civil servants have as well as district judges and Metropolitan magistrates have their offices within the city.

Rajshahi is one of seven metropolitan cities in Bangladesh. One mayor and 30 ward commissioners are elected for five-year terms by direct votes. Rajshahi City Corporation is responsible for all the administrative work related to city governance under its jurisdiction.

Rajshahi Unnayan Kortripokhkho/Rajshahi Development Authority (RDA) plans and coordinates the development-related works within the metropolitan area. Rajshahi WASA is responsible for the water supply and drainage system within the city area.

Rajshahi Metropolitan Police (RMP), headed by a Commissioner, controls law and order as well as traffic movements within the metropolitan area.

Rajshahi Cantonment is a military base and the headquarters of the Bangladesh Infantry Regiment. The city is home to two battalions of BGB, a battalion of Bangladesh Ansar, a headquarter of RAB and a camp of River Police.

== Demographics ==
Population

Historical population

Year	Pop.	±% p.a.
1991	294,056	—
2001	388,811	+2.83%

Year	Pop.	±% p.a.
2011	449,756	+1.47%
2022	553,288	+1.90%

Rajshahi city population increased from 449,756 in 2011 to 553,288 in 2022, according to census data.

Religions

Religions in Rajshahi city (2022)
Religion	Percent
Islam	94.15%
Hinduism	5.09%
Christianity	0.51%
Buddhism	0.02%
Other or not stated	0.04%

At the time of the 2022 census, Rajshahi had a population of 553,288 in 213,467 households. Rajshahi has a sex ratio of 942 females per 1000 males and a literacy rate of 75.17%

Bengali is the main language for the citizens of the city. Many distinctive Bengali dialects and regional languages are also spoken. There is a minority Urdu-speaking population, who are descendants of displaced Muslims from the eastern part of British India who sought refuge during the separation of India and Pakistan in 1947.

== Economy ==
Key Economic Activities in Rajshahi
1. 42.0% [42]: Trade
2. 23.0% [23]: Transportation and storage
3. 17.0% [17]: Education
4. 8.00% [8]: Manufacturing
5. 6.00% [6]: Accommodation
6. 2.00% [2]: Health
7. 2.00% [2]: Other

Rajshahi’s economy is composed of trade (42%), transportation and storage (23%), education (17%), manufacturing (8%), accommodation (6%), health (2%), and other sectors (2%).

Rajshahi has been famous for its silk textiles since the British period, which has a special status as clothing material in the Indian subcontinent. There are also several jute mills in Rajshahi. It is the home of the region's best mangoes. The lichis of the city also has a great popularity.

Rajshahi City Corporation has constructed two Bangladesh Small and Cottage Industries Corporation. Industrial City-01 is located near the Rajshahi Cantonment, and Industrial City-02 is located in Paba Upazila. BSCIC-1 is operational, but BSCIC-2 did not attract any significant investment.

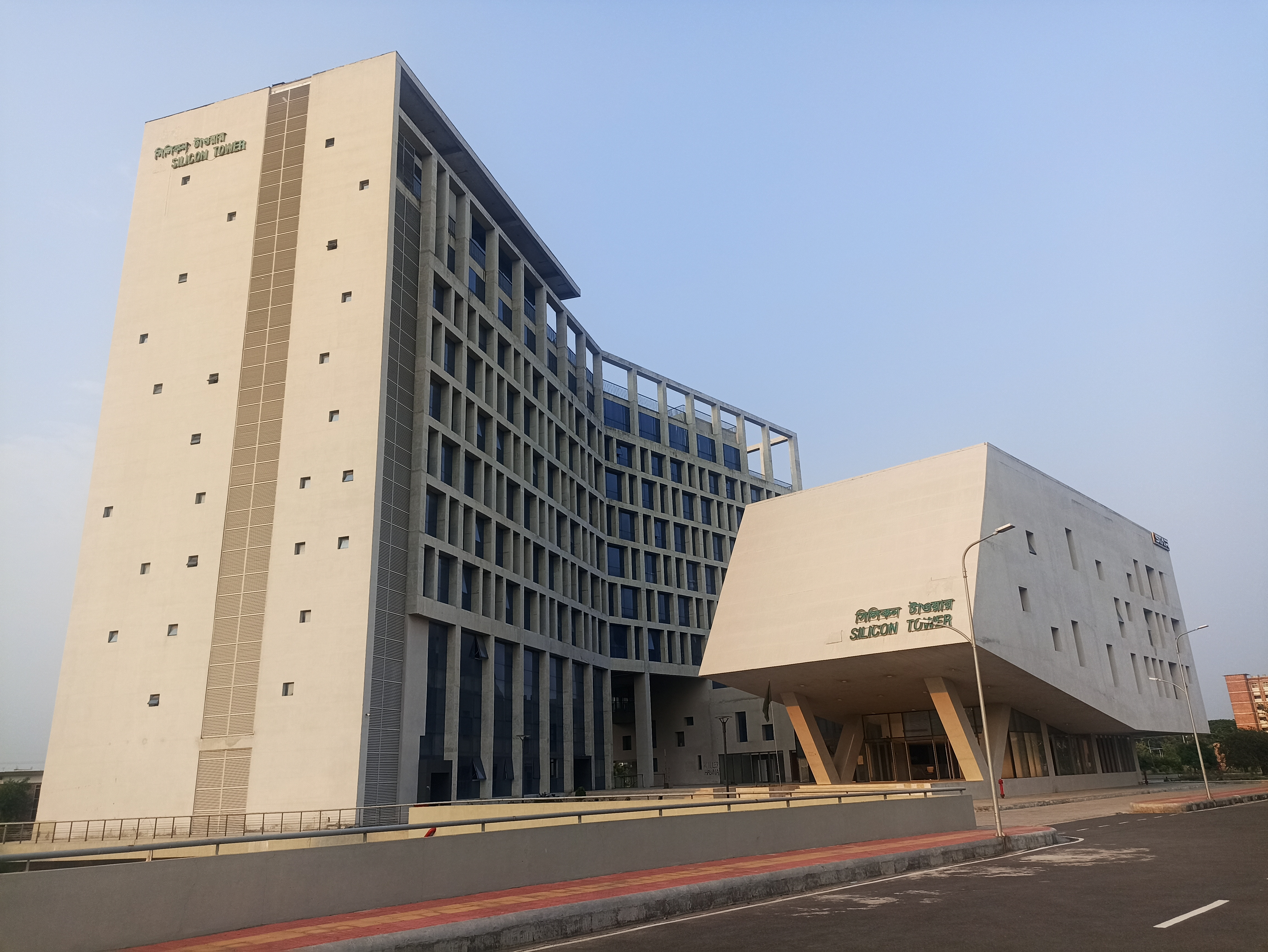
Silicon Tower, Rajshahi Hi-Tech Park

The Silicon Tower in Rajshahi Hi-Tech Park has attracted significant interest from investors, with 16 different companies currently occupying the facility, including Starlink. Out of these, 11 companies are operational. Bondstein Technology, a local company involved in the infrastructure development and management for Starlink in Bangladesh, plans to establish a Robotics and IoT Research Center within the park.

In 2025, Pran-RFL revived Barendra Rajshahi Textile Mills after 22 years, creating 2,000 jobs in just 6 months. They aim to create a total of 12,000 jobs with a planned investment of 350 crore.

There is also a char on the banks of the river Padma near the city of Rajshahi. Rajshahi City Corporation has plans to build another economic zone on the char. When the construction of the char is completed, it will become the commercial center of North Bengal.

Hi-Tech Specialized Hospital building in Rajshahi.

== Culture ==
=== Arts and festivals ===
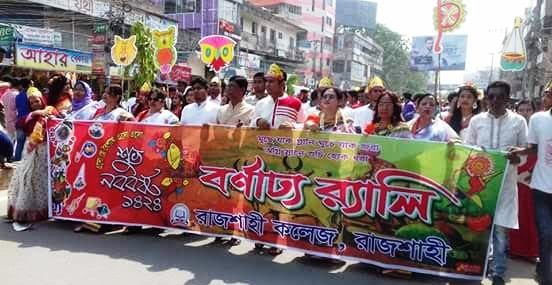
Bengali New Year / বাংলা নববর্ষ celebration rally at Rajshahi city

Rajshahi is also the location of Barendra Museum, which is known for its collection of local sculptures and other artifacts dating from medieval times.

Pohela Baishakh, the Bengali New Year, and Pahela Falgun, the first day of spring of the Bengali month Falgun, in the Bengali calendar, is festively celebrated in the city. There are widespread celebrations of Muslim festivals of Eid ul-Fitr, Eid ul-Adha, and Muharram; Hindu festivals of Durga Puja, the Buddhist festival of Buddha Purnima; and the Christian festival of Christmas across the city.

=== Media ===
There are many Bengali daily newspapers published in the city, including Sonali Sangbad, Uttorbongo Protidin, Shadhin Janapad, Sunshine, Dainik Barta, Sonar Desh, Natun Provat, and Amader Rajshahi. There are also many online news portal such as Uttarkal, Padmatimes24, AjkerRajshahi, rajshahinews24.com, silkcitynews.com, Priyojon TV and others.

State-owned Bangladesh Television and Bangladesh Betar have transmission centers in Rajshahi. The BTV relay station in Rajshahi is headquartered in the Kazihata neighborhood and has been operating since 2001.

A local FM radio station, Radio Padma, transmits at 99.2 MHz frequency and Radio Foorti transmits at 88.0 MHz.

There are also five press clubs in Rajshahi City. Known as Rajshahi City Press Club, Rajshahi Press Club, Rajshahi Metropolitan Press Club, Rajshahi Varendra Press Club, and Rajshahi Padma Press Club.

=== Sports ===
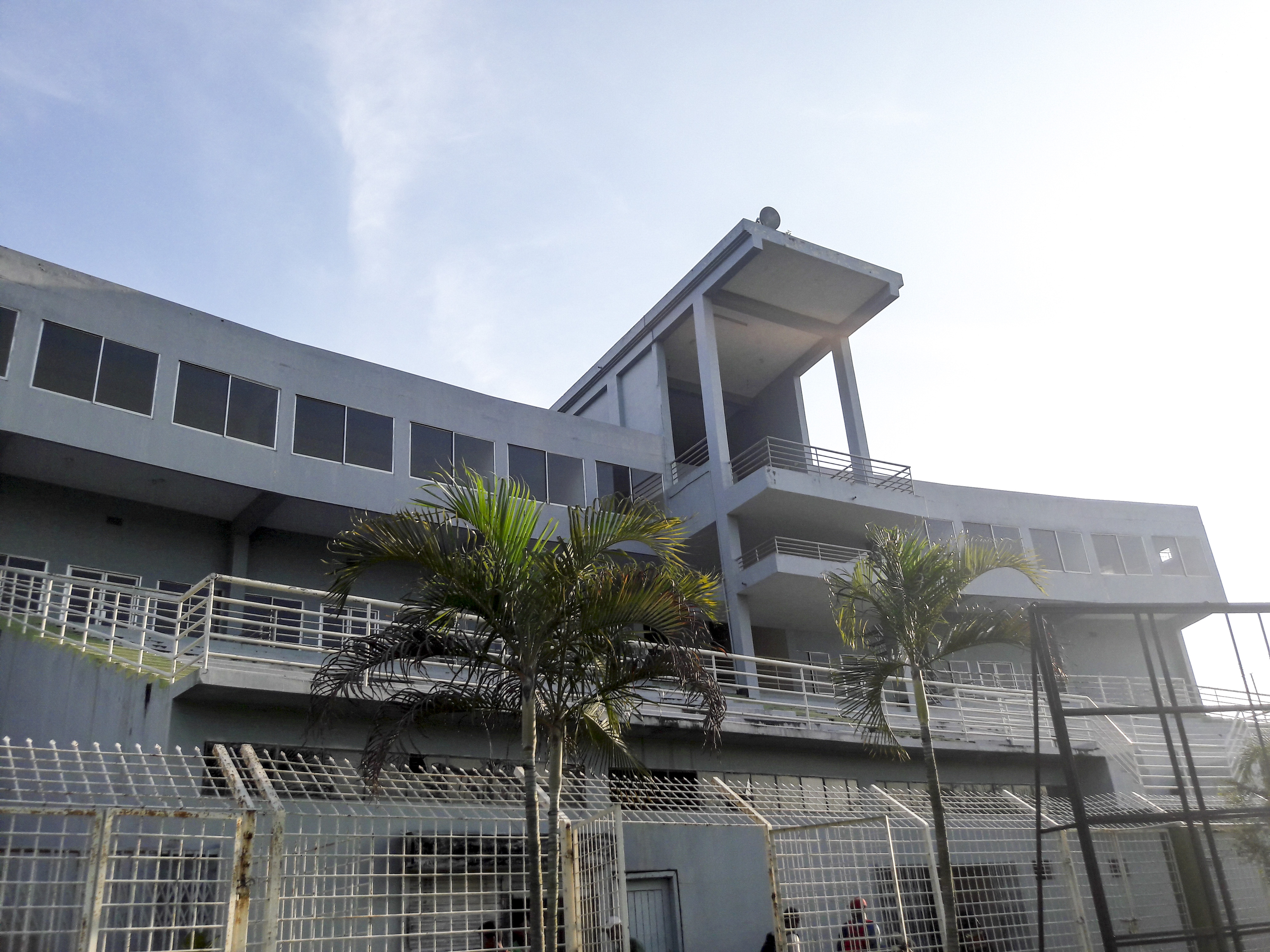
Shaheed Qamaruzzaman Stadium

There are three 15,000+ capacity stadiums in the city. One is at the center of the city which is normally called the Rajshahi District Stadium, another is inside the Rajshahi University and the last one used for cricket is located at Terokhadia called Shaheed Qamaruzzaman Stadium. This is the home ground of Rajshahi Division cricket team. There is also an international standard tennis complex and a few sports training academies in the city.

Many national-level footballers groomed in the city such as former Bangladesh national team captain Mohammed Mohsin and recent midfielder Manik Hossain Molla. The city is the home of several national-level club teams like Diganta Proshari Sangha and Sonali Otit Club. There are also a few football training academies including one in Rajshahi's central eidgah (large open ground used on special occasions for Muslim prayers) and in the Zilla stadium.

The city is an important place for cricket in Bangladesh. As a regular supplier of cricketers in the national team, it is also the home of Bangladesh Premier League team Rajshahi Warriors, which won the BPL title once. The city has two cricket academies, Banglatrack and Clemon, to grow and train upcoming cricketers.

Rajshahi is also known for hockey. Many local hockey practice clubs allow playing at national, inter-university, college, and school levels. There are National Team hockey players from Rajshahi. Late Mintu was one of them and by his name, there is "Mintu Chottor" at Lokkhipur Mor, Rajshahi.

It also has multiple tennis complexes, which regularly host national and international competitions.

=== Achievements ===
Rajshahi has received the National Environment Award in 2013 and 2021, and the Environment Friendly City of the Year title in 2020. The city also earned the Prime Minister's National Award for Tree Plantation in 2009, 2010, 2011, and 2013.

== Transport ==
=== Road ===
Rajshahi is connected to most other parts of the country via the N6 national highway. There are two intercity bus terminals in the city. It takes about 5 to 6 hours by road to reach the capital city Dhaka. Several bus services, including air-conditioned, non-air-conditioned and sleeper buses, are available to and from Dhaka. Bus services to other major cities and the district's headquarters are also available from Rajshahi.

=== Railway ===
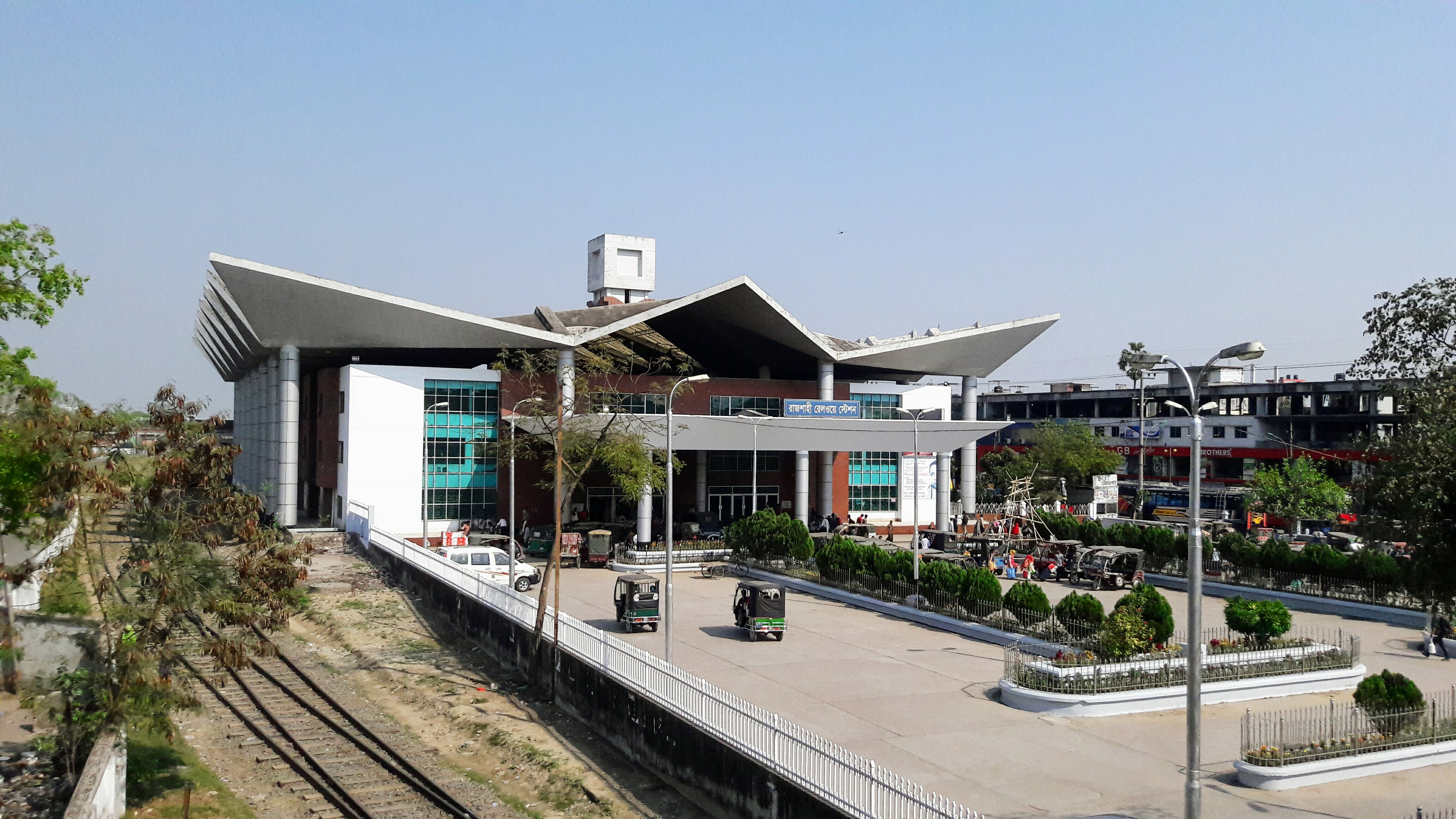
Rajshahi central railway station

Rajshahi has a central railway station with a total of five platforms. This station is the home of five intercity trains.

Four inter-city train services are operated by Bangladesh Railway, named Silk City Express, Padma Express and Dhumketu Express, and Bonolota Express between Dhaka and Rajshahi railway station regularly. There are other inter-city trains operated from Rajshahi to Khulna and other regions of the country. There are also mail/express trains.

There are two other railway stations in the city, Rajshahi Court and Rajshahi University.

=== Air ===
Shah Makhdum Airport, Rajshahi

The city is served by Shah Makhdum Airport, named after the Islamic preacher Shah Makhdum Rupos, situated at Nowhata, a commuter town of the city. Biman Bangladesh Airlines, Novoair, and US-Bangla Airlines operate domestic flights to and from Dhaka.

=== Public transport ===
Electric auto rickshaws and electric rickshaws are the primary modes of transport within the city and metro area. Once there were plenty of Tomtoms (horse-driven cart) in the city, which have since faded in use. Some parts of the city are also serviced by CNG auto rickshaws.

== Healthcare ==
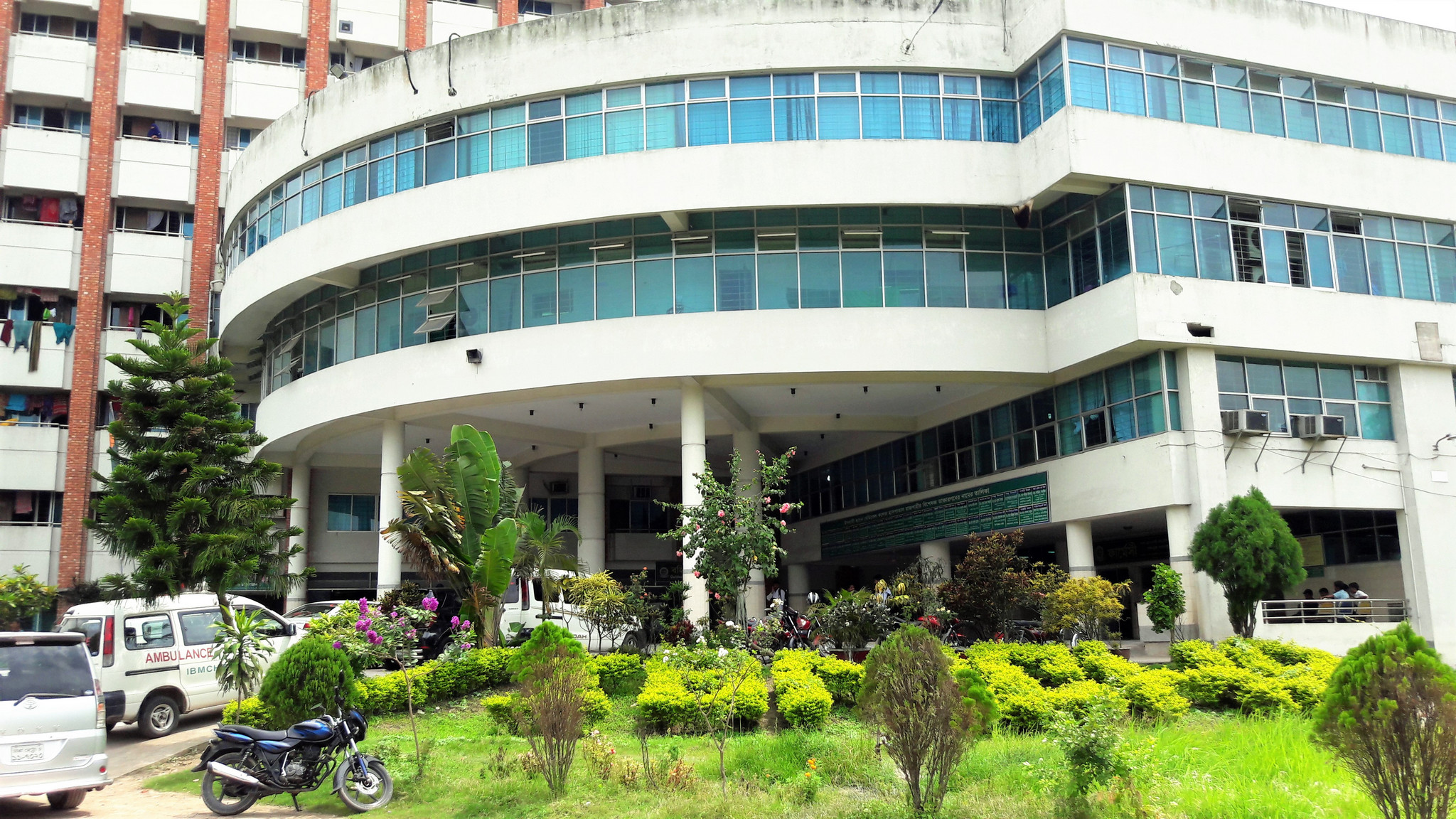
Islami Bank Medical College & Hospital

The city has many government, private and NGO-run hospitals. Rajshahi Medical College Hospital (RMCH) is a tertiary-level public hospital with a teaching facility for graduate and postgraduate medical education. There are two private medical college hospitals, and another two are under construction in the city. There is also a government-run children's hospital, one chest hospital, a district-level government hospital, and a Christian missionary hospital within the city area.

== Education ==
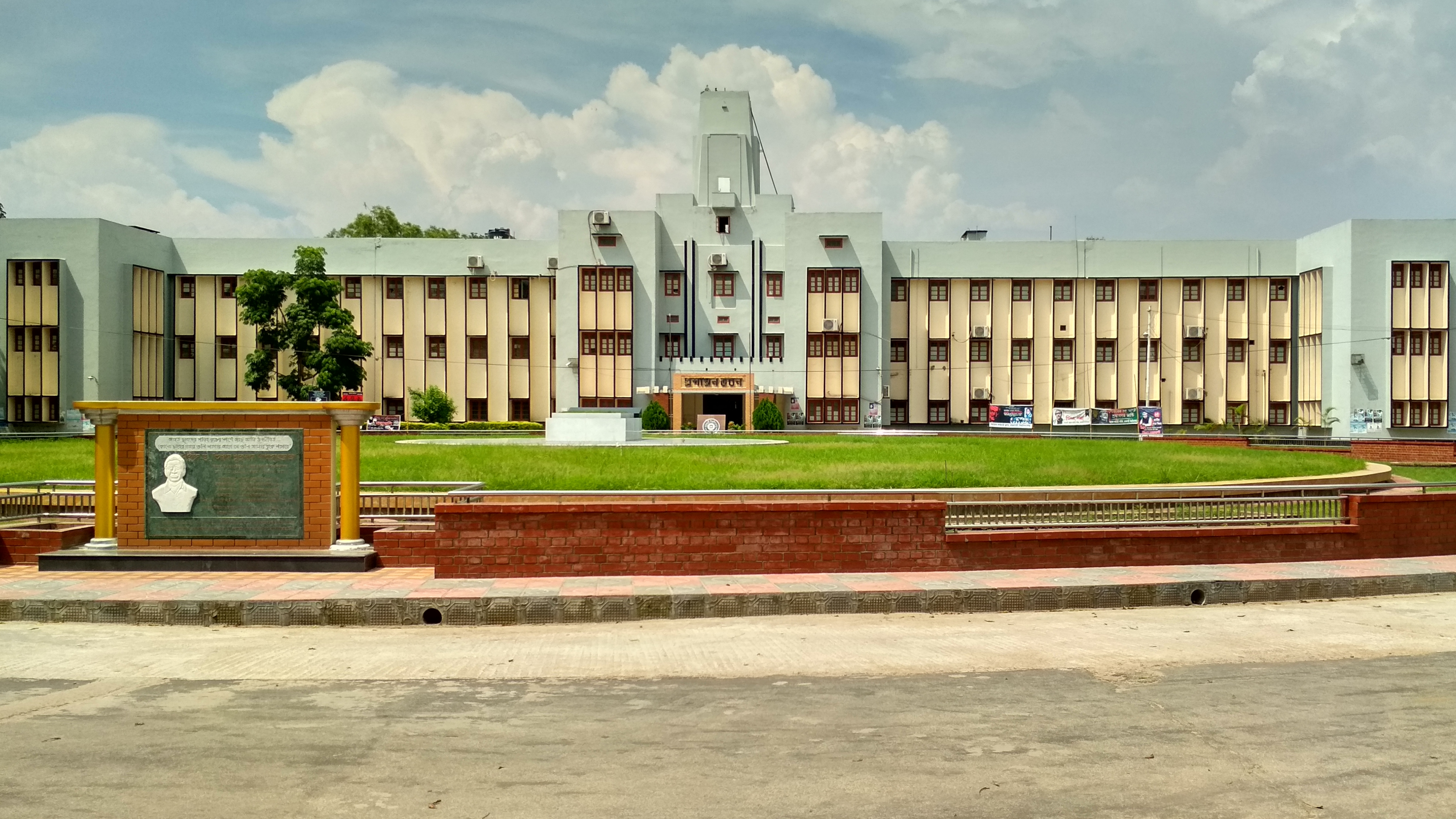
Administrative building of University of Rajshahi

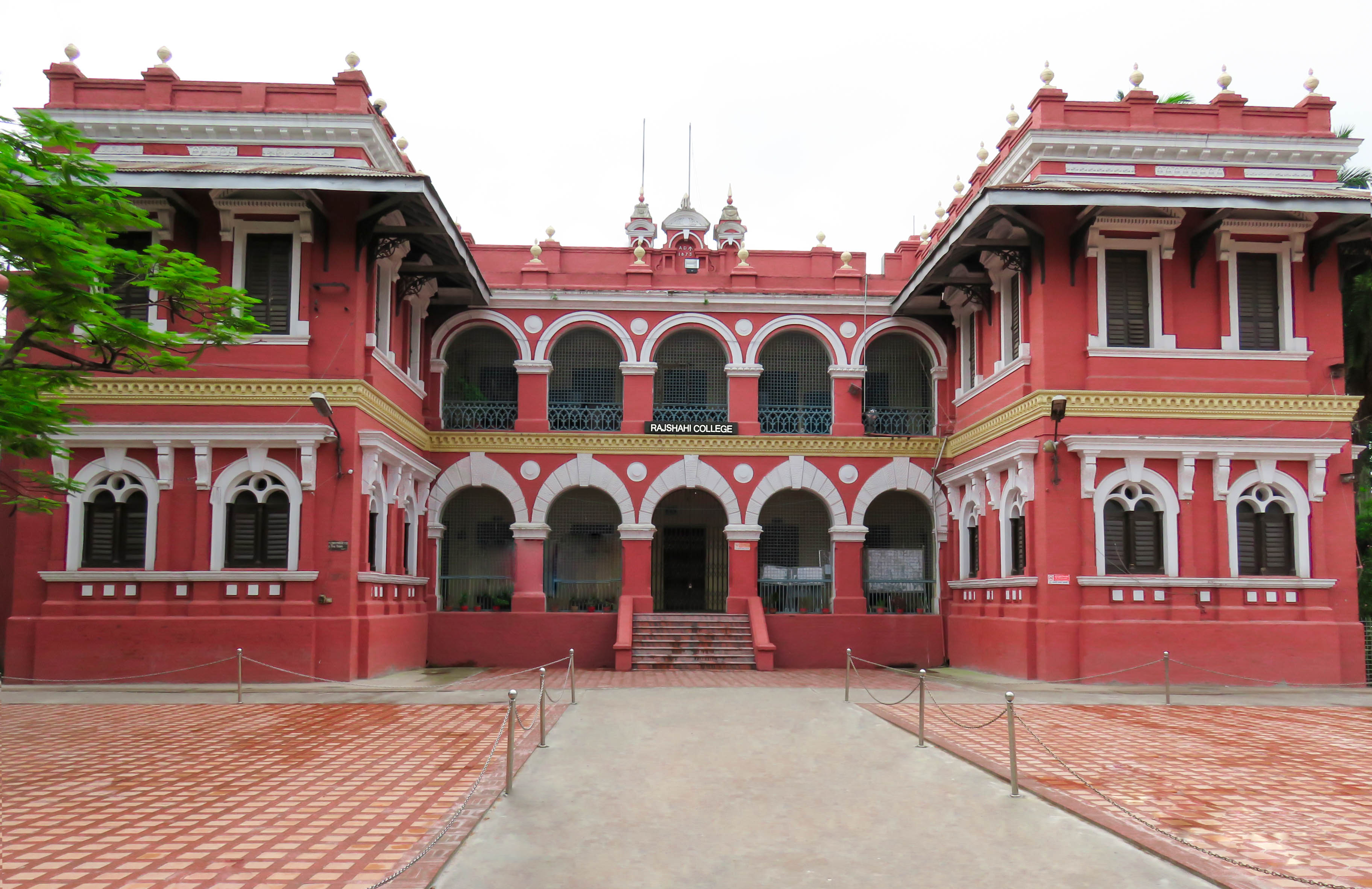
Administrative building of Rajshahi College

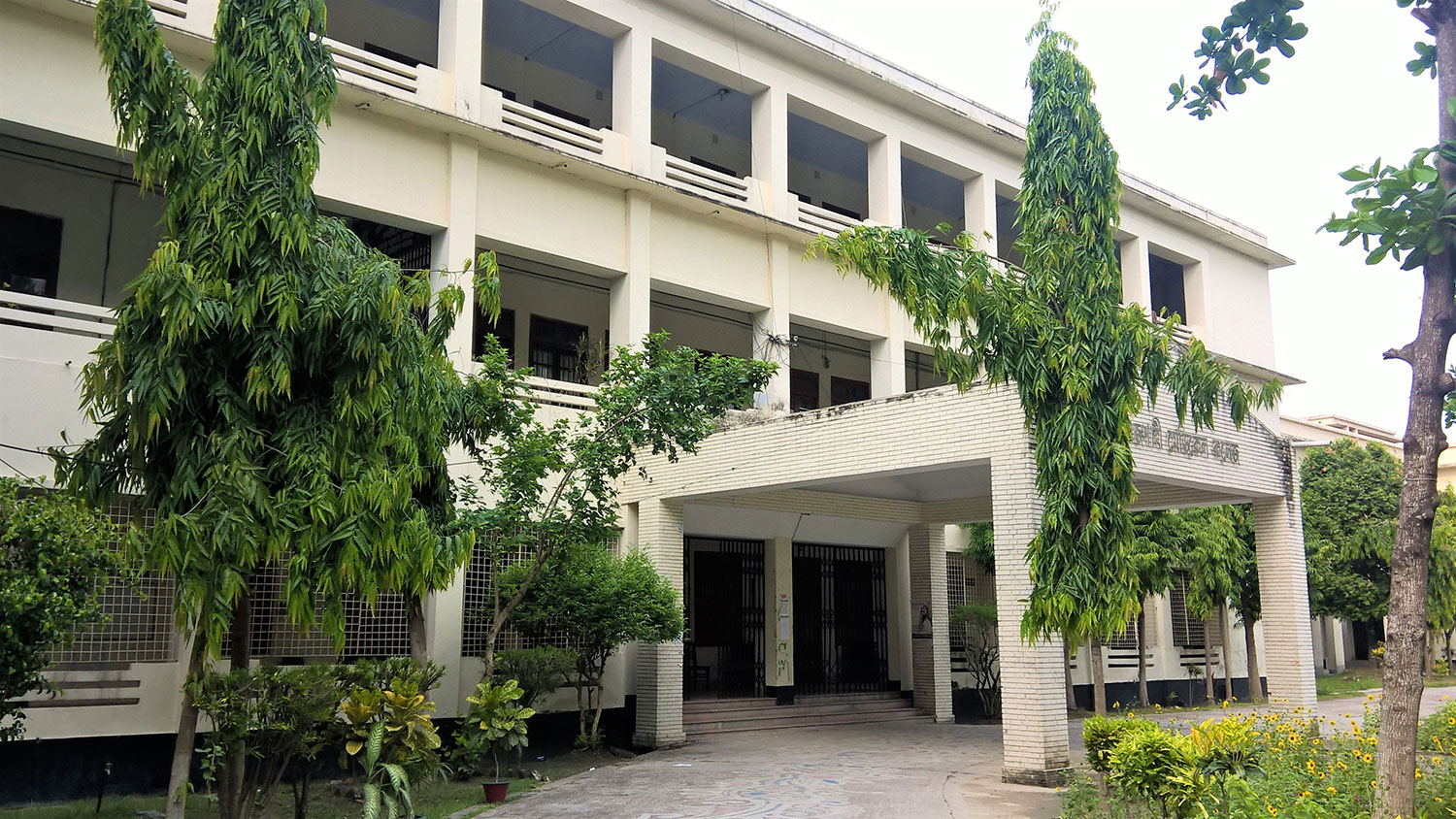
Administrative building of Rajshahi Medical College

Rajshahi, commonly referred to as Education City (Sikkha Nogori), is home to many government, private and autonomous educational institutions.

The secondary and higher secondary institutions in the city fall under the jurisdiction of the Board of Intermediate and Secondary Education, Rajshahi.

The city is home to the Rajshahi College- which is the third oldest college in Bangladesh after Dhaka College, and Chittagong College. Rajshahi Medical College is the second oldest medical college in erstwhile East Pakistan. The University of Rajshahi is the second oldest and one of the largest public universities in the country. Rajshahi Engineering College, now known as RUET, was the second engineering college established in East Pakistan in 1964. For Technical Education Rajshahi Polytechnic Institute was Established in 1963, This Institute is under the Bangladesh Technical Education Board.

Rajshahi consistently leads in pass rates and GPA 5 achievements in SSC and HSC results.

=== Notable educational institutions ===
- University of Rajshahi
- Rajshahi University of Engineering & Technology
- Varendra University
- North Bengal International University
- Rajshahi Medical University
- Institute of Health Technology, Rajshahi
- Rajshahi Medical College
- Islami Bank Medical College
- Rajshahi Polytechnic Institute
- Rajshahi College
- New Government Degree College, Rajshahi
- Rajshahi Government City College
- Shahid A.H.M. Kamaruzzaman Govt. Degree College
- Rajshahi Collegiate School
- Masjid Mission Academy
- Govt. Laboratory High School, Rajshahi
- Rajshahi Government Girls' High School
- Haji Muhammad Mohsin Government High School, Rajshahi
- Rajshahi Loknath High School
- Rajshahi University School

== Notable residents ==
- Abul Hasnat Muhammad Qamaruzzaman, politician
- A. H. M. Khairuzzaman Liton, politician
- Akshay Kumar Maitreya, historian
- Andrew Kishore, singer
- Baroness Uddin, activist
- Bidya Sinha Saha Mim, actress
- Enamul Karim Nirjhar, architect
- Fazle Hossain Badsha, politician
- Hasanuzzaman Khan Bablu, footballer
- Hasan Azizul Huq, linguist
- Ila Mitra, activist
- Jadunath Sarkar, historian
- Junaid Siddique, cricketer
- Khaled Mashud, cricketer
- Mahiya Mahi, actress
- Malay Bhowmick, playwright and director
- Manik Hossain Molla, footballer
- Mizanur Rahman Minu, politician
- Mohammad A. Arafat, politician
- Mohammed Mohsin, footballer
- Mohammad Shamsuzzoha, academic
- Mostakim Wazed, footballer
- Mrinal Haque, sculptor
- Najmul Hossain Shanto, cricketer
- Nusrat Imrose Tisha, actress
- Rajanikanta Sen, poet
- Ritwik Ghatak, filmmaker
- Sabbir Rahman, cricketer
- Saleh Hasan Naqib, researcher
- Sarfaraz Ahmed Rafiqui, fighter pilot
- Selina Hossain, novelist
- Shahriar Alam, politician
- Shakil Hossain, footballer

== Twin towns and sister cities ==
Rajshahi's twin town and sister cities are:

- Kristiansand, Norway (1979)
- Yiyang, China (2018)

== See also ==
- Rajshahi District
- Rajshahi Division
- North Bengal
- North Bengal Province
- List of cities and towns in Bangladesh
