= Polygamy in Bangladesh =

Polygamy and civil polygamous marriages are legal in Bangladesh but restricted according to a law of 1961, though the practice is rapidly declining. According to a Pew Research Center study, less than 1% of Bangladeshi men are in polygamous marriage, much lower than the average rate found in other nations that permit polygamy. Certain cities have also placed hefty taxes on the practice of polygamy, with the tax increasing for each new wife the man takes. A Bangladeshi Muslim man can marry up to four wives at the same time but must have permission from existing wives. There is no known limit for the number of wives a Hindu man can take in Bangladesh.

== Muslim family law ==
Muslim family law regulates polygamy in the Muslim community of Bangladesh. 6. (1) No man, during the subsistence of an existing marriage, shall, except with the previous permission in writing of the Arbitration Council, contract another marriage, nor shall any such marriage contracted without such permission be registered 6[ under the Muslim Marriages and Divorces (Registration) Act, 1974 (LII of 1974)]. (2) An application for permission under sub-section (1) together with the prescribed fee, and shall state the reasons for the proposed marriage, and whether the consent of the existing wife or wives has been obtained thereto. (3) On receipt of the application under sub-section (2), the Chairman shall ask the applicant and his existing wife or wives each to nominate a representative, and the Arbitration Council so constituted may, if satisfied that the proposed marriage is necessary and just, grant, subject to such conditions, if any, as may be deemed fit, the permission applied for. (4) In deciding the application the Arbitration Council shall record its reasons for the decision, and any party may, in the prescribed manner, within the prescribed period, and on payment of the prescribed fee, prefer an application for revision to the Assistant Judge concerned and his decision shall be final and shall not be called in question in any Court. (5) Any man who contracts another marriage without the permission of the Arbitration Council shall-(a) pay immediately the entire amount of the dower, whether prompt or deferred, due to the existing wife or wives, which amount, if not so paid, shall be recoverable as arrears of land revenue; and (b) on conviction upon complaint be punishable with simple imprisonment which may extend to one year, or with fine which may extend to 9[ ten thousand taka], or with both.

== Hindu family law ==
Hindu Family law governs the personal life of Hindus in Bangladesh. It permits polygamy for Hindu men, who can have an unlimited number of wives. There is no provision for divorce. Attempts to change the law by the government has faced steep resistance from Hindu Extremists.

== Local laws ==
In Rajshahi, taxes were imposed on additional brides. The former Mayor of Rajshahi, Mizanur Rahman Minu, said "Polygamy is a disrespectful and outdated act", despite the Quran allowing up to four wives for a man.
