= Gazi Abdul Haq =

Bangladeshi politician

- গাজী আব্দুল হক

Member of Parliament for Khulna-5
- In office 15 February 1996 – 12 June 1996
- Preceded by: Salhuddin Yusuf
- Succeeded by: Salhuddin Yusuf

Personal details
- Party: Bangladesh Nationalist Party

Gazi Abdul Haq is a Bangladesh Nationalist Party politician and physician. He was elected a member of parliament for Khulna-5 in February 1996.

== Career ==
Gazi Abdul Haq is a physician. In 1993, he was the secretary general of the Bangladesh Medical Association. He then joined the Bangladesh Nationalist Party (BNP).

He was elected to parliament from Khulna-5 as a Bangladesh Nationalist Party candidate in the 15 February 1996 Bangladeshi general election.

He was nominated vice president in 2009 at the Khulna district BNP conference.
