= 2023 Rajshahi City Corporation election =

Mayor and council election in Bangladesh

- 21 June 2023
- Registered: 351,982 (▲9.64 pp)
- Turnout: 56.20% (▼20.08 pp)
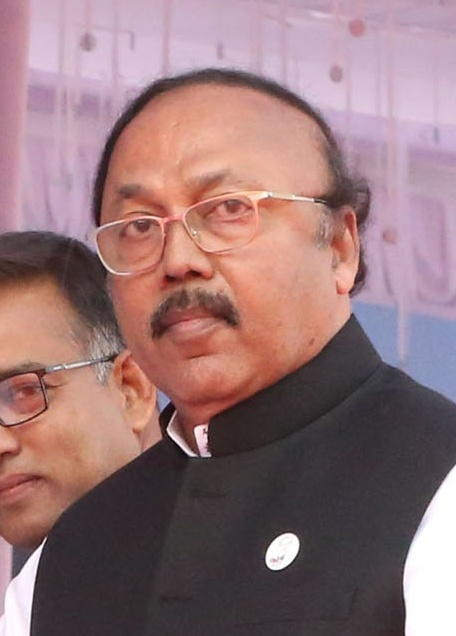
| | First party | Second party |
|---|---|---|
| Candidate | A. H. M. Khairuzzaman Liton | Murshid Alam |
| Party | AL | IAB |
| Popular vote | 160,290 | 13,483 |
| Percentage | 81.88% | 6.89% |
| Swing | ▲30.05pp | ▲6.89pp |
Mayor before election
A. H. M. Khairuzzaman Liton
Awami League
Elected Mayor
A. H. M. Khairuzzaman Liton
Awami League
- Council election
- 21 June 2023; 40 seats in the Rajshahi City Corporation
| Party | Leader | Seats | +/– |
|---|---|---|---|
| AL | A. H. M. Khairuzzaman Liton | 31 | +5 |
| BNP | Didn't participate | 6 | +1 |
| WPB | — | 1 | 0 |
| Independent | — | 2 | −6 |
This lists parties that won seats. See the complete results below.

The 2023 Rajshahi City Corporation election was a local government election in the city of Rajshahi, Bangladesh, held on 21 June 2023 to elect the mayor of Rajshahi and the Rajshahi City Council. The election resulted in a victory for the Awami League candidate A. H. M. Khairuzzaman Liton. In the 40-member city council, the Awami League won 31 seats, while the Bangladesh Nationalist Party won 6 seats, the Workers Party of Bangladesh won 1 seat, and independents won 2 seats. In this election, Awami League candidate achieved a landslide victory.

== Schedule ==
The schedule of the election was announced by the Election Commission of Bangladesh on 29 March 2023.

| Event | Date | Day |
|---|---|---|
| Date of Notification | 3 April 2023 | Monday |
| Deadline for submission of nomination paper | 23 May 2023 | |
| Date for scrutiny of nominations | 25 May 2023 | |
| Appeal against the nomination paper scrutiny | 26–28 May 2023 | |
| Appeal resolve | 29–31 May 2023 | |
| Last date for withdrawal of candidatures | 1 June 2023 | |
| Symbols distribution | 2 June 2023 | |
| Date of poll & counting | 21 June 2023 | Wednesday |

== Candidates ==
=== Mayoral election ===
A total of 4 candidates contested for the mayoral post.

| Name | Election Symbol | Party | Ref. |
|---|---|---|---|
| A. H. M. Khairuzzaman Liton | Nouka (Boat) | Bangladesh Awami League | |
| Murshid Alam | Hatpakha (Hand fan) | Islami Andolon Bangladesh | |
| Saiful Islam | Langol (Plough) | Jatiya Party (Ershad) | |
| AKM Anowar Hossain | Golap ful (Rose) | Zaker Party | |

=== Council election ===
In Rajshahi, 46 candidates contested for 10 women-reserved seats and 112 contested for 30 seats of ward councillors.

== Mayoral election results ==
A. H. M. Khairuzzaman Liton was elected as mayor of the Rajshahi City Corporation by defeating Islami Andolan Bangladesh candidate Murshid Alam.

| Candidate | Party | Votes | % |
|---|---|---|---|
| A. H. M. Khairuzzaman Liton | Bangladesh Awami League | 160,290 | 81.88 |
| Murshid Alam | Islami Andolan Bangladesh | 13,483 | 6.89 |
| Latif Anwar | Zaker Party | 11,713 | 5.98 |
| Saiful Islam Swapan | Jatiya Party (Ershad) | 10,272 | 5.25 |
| Total | | 195,758 | 100.00 |
| Valid votes | | 195,758 | 98.96 |
| Invalid/blank votes | | 2,055 | 1.04 |
| Total votes | | 197,813 | 100.00 |
| Registered voters/turnout | | 351,982 | 56.20 |

== Council election results ==
=== Party-wise ===
2023 RCC council election results (party-wise)
| Party | Leader | Councilor contested seats | Councilor elected in Seats | Ward Councilors | Reserved Women Councilors |
|---|---|---|---|---|---|
| Bangladesh Awami League | A. H. M. Khairuzzaman Liton | 40 | 31 / 40 | 23 | 8 |
| Bangladesh Nationalist Party | Didn't participate | unknown | 6 / 40 | 5 | 1 |
| Workers Party of Bangladesh | Didn't participate | unknown | 1 / 40 | 1 | 0 |
| Independent | unknown | | 2 / 40 | 1 | 1 |
| Total | | | 40 | 30 | 10 |

== See also ==
- 2023 elections in Bangladesh
- 2023 Bangladeshi urban local elections
