= Rajshahi City Corporation =

Local governing body of Rajshahi, Bangladesh

Coordinates: 24.366667°N 88.700000°E

Rajshahi City Corporation রাজশাহী সিটি কর্পোরেশন
- Emblem of the Rajshahi City Corporation

Type
- Type: City Corporation

History
- Founded: 1990; 36 years ago
- New session started: 14 March 2026

Leadership
- Mayor: Vacant since 19 August 2024
- Administrator: Md. Mahfuzur Rahman Riton, BNP since 14 March 2026
- Deputy Mayor: Vacant since 19 August 2024
- Chief Executive Officer: Md. Rejaul Karim since 23 April 2025

Structure
- Seats: Vacant seats: 40 councillors
- Length of term: Up to five years

Elections
- Voting system: First past the post
- Last election: 21 June 2023
- Next election: 2027

Meeting place
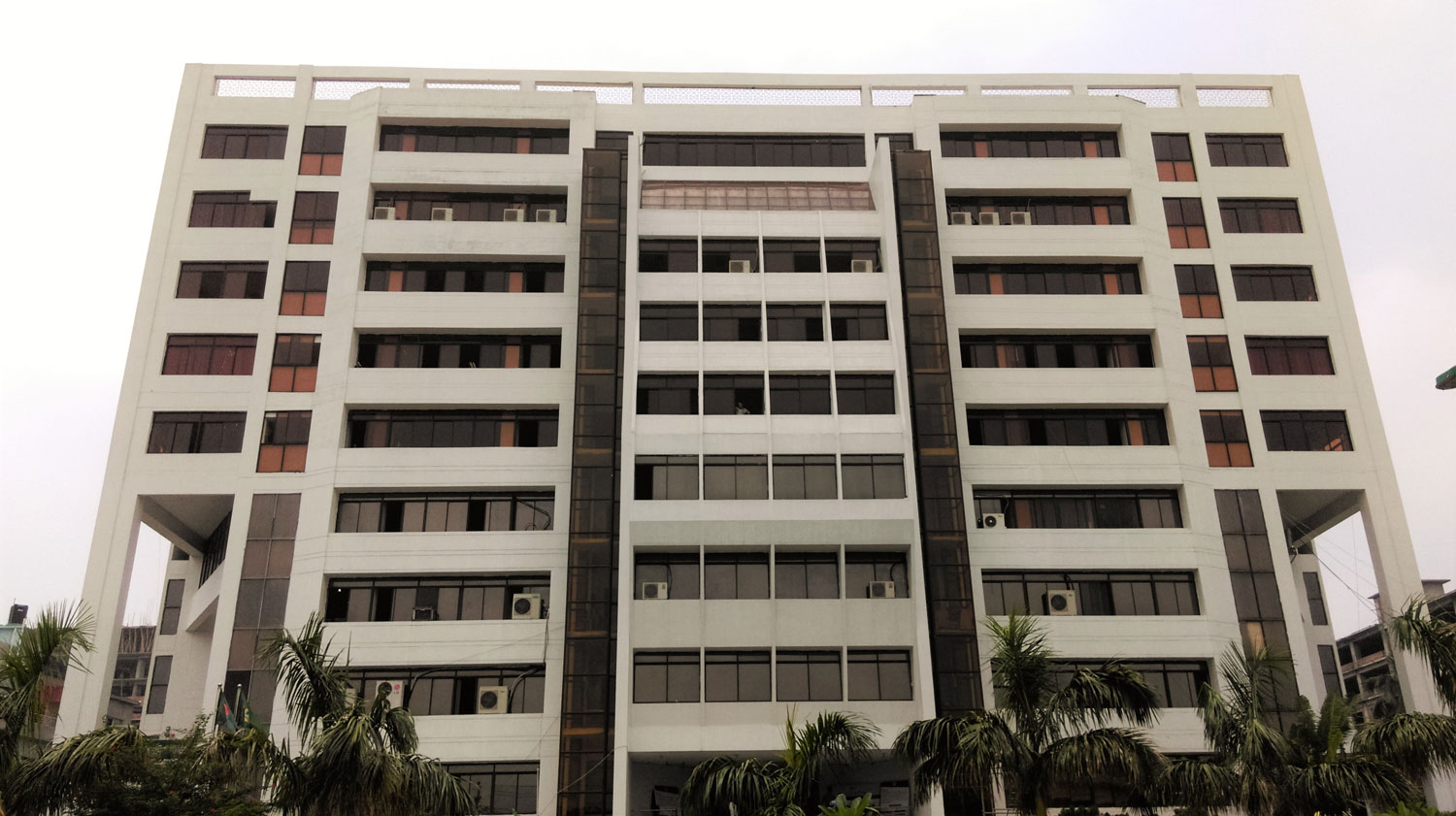
- Nagar Bhaban, Rajshahi

Website
- erajshahi.portal.gov.bd

Rajshahi City Corporation (Bengali: রাজশাহী সিটি কর্পোরেশন: in short-RCC) is a local government authority responsible for administering all civic services in the Rajshahi, the city of Bangladesh. The RCC government is elected by popular vote every five years. The corporation is headed by a mayor, who oversees a council consisting of 40 councillors representing different wards of the city. The functions and powers of the RCC are defined under the provisions of The City Corporation Act, 2009.

Rajshahi City Corporation is one of the major divisional city corporations of Bangladesh. The incorporated area was divided into several wards. Each ward has an elected ward commissioner. The mayor of the city is elected by popular vote every five years. The next election is announced to be held on 2023.

Rajshahi City Corporation is renowned for its success in reducing of high concentrations of small particulates (PM10 and PM2.5) and air pollution.

== History ==
Rajshahi City Corporation was established as the Rajshahi Municipality (Rampur-Boalia Municipality) on 1 August 1876. A town committee of 7 members led by a former principal of Rajshahi College was formed by the Government headquartered in Rajshahi College. Most of the members were later replaced by the elected members. Only the tax-payers could attend the election. The administrator and the Medical Officer were also among the members of the committee. Beside this committee, there was also a Municipal Board. In 1884, the committee was expanded to 21 according to the 3rd rule of Bengal Municipality act 1884. In 1921, the headquarter was shifted to the Municipality Building established near Sona Dighi, Rajshahi. In 1930, 8 municipal committees were formed. The members of the councils were elected by vote for one year. Each committee had separate functions, such as public sanitation and health, public safety, welfare, education and water supply. It gained status as the Rajshahi Municipality Corporation on 13 August 1987, and later renamed as Rajshahi City Corporation.

== Powers and responsibilities ==
- City health department
- Engineering department (Water supply)
- Engineering department (Power supply)
- Tax department
- Conservancy department

The Rajshahi City Corporation (RCC) is responsible for administering the city and ensuring the provision of essential infrastructure and public services. Its functions include urban planning, transport management, healthcare, education, waste management, water supply, and security. Through these services, RCC aims to improve the quality of life for residents and promote sustainable urban development.

Departments of Rajshahi City Corporation
#	Departments	Functions / Services
1	Office of the Mayor	Executive leadership; overall city governance; policy direction; supervision and coordination of all RCC departments
2	Chief Executive Office	Inter-departmental coordination; monitoring implementation of services and development projects
3	Administration and Establishment	Human resource management; staff recruitment, posting and promotion; internal discipline and service delivery oversight
4	Finance and Accounts	Budget preparation; financial planning; revenue and expenditure control; payment processing; accounts management; internal audit
5	Engineering	Infrastructure supervision; road-cutting permission; building plan approval; contractor enlistment; land demarcation certification
6	Urban Planning and Development	Road, drain, bridge, culvert and footpath development; land development; planned residential areas; city beautification
7	Electricity	Installation and maintenance of street lights; lamp-post management; city illumination
8	Transportation and Communication	Urban transport management; traffic & parking control; emergency transport; corpse handling; bus terminal management; road roller & ambulance services
9	Waste Management and Cleaning	Solid waste collection and disposal; street cleaning; drain clearing; mosquito control; landfill management
10	Health	Hospital & clinic management; maternal & child immunization; vitamin A campaigns; midwifery and health technology training
11	Registrar	Birth & death certificates; nationality, inheritance & character certificates
12	Education	Management of schools, madrasas, Sanskrit tolls, kindergartens, technical institutes; adult education; teacher training; cultural & theatre institutes
13	Water Supply and Sewerage	Water supply coordination; sewerage management under Rajshahi WASA
14	Revenue	Trade license issuance & renewal; holding tax collection; shop/market allotment; lease and asset management
15	Security and Law and Order	City security; joint operations with RMP; CCTV installation and monitoring
16	Magistracy	Arbitration-based case settlement; mobile courts; anti-adulteration drives
17	Housing and Public Works	Allocation, development and maintenance of residential plots, flats and metropolitan housing projects
18	Social welfare	Welfare programs for the poor, elderly, women and persons with disabilities; social assistance; community development initiatives
19	Environmental and Public health	Pollution control; sanitation monitoring; food safety; climate change adaptation and mitigation; urban greening and tree plantation
20	Disaster management and Relief	Disaster preparedness and response; emergency rescue operations; relief distribution during floods, cyclones, fires and other natural calamities
21	Religious Welfare	Support for religious festivals including Eid and Puja; regulation of Qurbani cattle markets; land allocation and logistical support for religious events

=== Budget ===
Rajshahi City Corporation (RCC) announced a budget of ৳806.61 crore (US$66 million) for the 2025-2026 fiscal year.

== Governance ==
Rajshahi City Corporation consists of 30 wards and 4 thanas such as, Boalia, Motihar, Rajpara and Shah Makhdum.

Ward no	The name of the police station	Name of the mahalla
1	Rajpara	1. Kashaydanga (Kathalbariya)
1	Rajpara	2. Shahajipara
1	Rajpara	3. Raipara
1	Rajpara	4. Aduburi
1	Rajpara	5. Ghuripara
1	Rajpara	6. Salagacha
1	Rajpara	7. Hargram (Munshipara)
1	Rajpara	8. Hordupur (part of the city corporation)
2	Rajpara	9. Hargram Newpara
2	Rajpara	10. Hargram Newpara
2	Rajpara	11. Hargram Ranidighi
2	Rajpara	12. Hargram Colony
2	Rajpara	13. Hargram Bidirpara
2	Rajpara	14. Nagarpara
2	Rajpara	15. Mollapara
2	Rajpara	16. Sheikhpara
3	Rajpara	17. Tenpukur
3	Rajpara	18. Baharampur
3	Rajpara	19. New Bisimla
3	Rajpara	20. Laksmipur (dingadoba, northern part of the railway line)
4	Rajpara	21. Hargram Bazar (Padmakamini road south and east part)
4	Rajpara	22. Bulanpur
4	Rajpara	23. Goalpara
4	Rajpara	24 Keshabpur
4	Rajpara	25. Nawabganj
5	Rajpara	26. Rajpara
5	Rajpara	27 Mahisbathan
5	Rajpara	28 Kulupara
5	Rajpara	29 Bhatapara (including Helenabad colony)
6	Rajpara	30. Laxmipur (part) and Baharampur (southern part of the railway line). (Railway line north, south-lakshmipur road, east boundary of the medical campus, Lakshmipur district on the west)
7	Rajpara	31. Chandipur
7	Rajpara	32. The northern part of east and west of lakshmipur vatapara
7	Rajpara	33. Serampore
7	Rajpara	34. Betiapara
8	Boalia (Actually 8th Wald Boalia-Rajpar Police Station)	35. Kazihaata
8	Boalia (Actually 8th Wald Boalia-Rajpar Police Station)	36. Sepipara
9	Boalia (Actually 8th Wald Boalia-Rajpar Police Station)	37. Hosnaganj
9	Boalia (Actually 8th Wald Boalia-Rajpar Police Station)	38. Sheikhpara
9	Boalia (Actually 8th Wald Boalia-Rajpar Police Station)	39 Dargapara
9	Boalia (Actually 8th Wald Boalia-Rajpar Police Station)	40. Zodhash
9	Boalia (Actually 8th Wald Boalia-Rajpar Police Station)	41. Sherusarpara
10	Boalia (part) and Rajpara (part)	42 Hematch
10	Boalia (part) and Rajpara (part)	43. Old Balsimla 44 Goalpara
10	Boalia (part) and Rajpara (part)	45. Wapda Colony (Kalabagan)
10	Boalia (part) and Rajpara (part)	46. Medical campus
11	Boalia	47. Hetmakhan Sajipara
11	Boalia	48. Hetamkhana (Panabhar)
11	Boalia	49. Malopara (western part)
11	Boalia	50. Rajahata
11	Boalia	51 Kadirganj (west part of the house)
11	Boalia	52 Matherpara
11	Boalia	53. Karikarpara
11	Boalia	54 Shahajipara
12	Boalia	55 Fadkipara
12	Boalia	56. Kumara Para
12	Boalia	57 Sahib ganj
12	Boalia	58 Saheb Bazar
12	Boalia	59 Queen market
12	Boalia	60 Malopara (eastern part)
12	Boalia	61. Ganakpara
12	Boalia	62. Miyapara
13	Boalia	63 Kadirganj (Gourhanga and Sthestala)
13	Boalia	64. Dakkharbora (southern part of the railway line)
14	Boalia (part) and Rajpara part	65 Suburb
14	Boalia (part) and Rajpara part	66. Terokhadia
15	Boalia	67. Sapura (Gorastan Para, Sahajipara, Polytechnic, Irrigation Division, Shalbagan)
15	Boalia	68. Kadirganj is not rash
15	Boalia	69. Dakhirbona (Northern Railway line)
16	Boalia	70 Sapura industrial area (including cantonment) 71 Zuranagar
16	Boalia	72 Matherdanga
16	Boalia	73. Bakhtiarabad
16	Boalia	74. Kirender
17	Shah Makhdum	75. Bigger
17	Shah Makhdum	76. Noadapara (According to Population Report 91, all areas covered in ward No. 17)
18	Boalia part and Shah Makhdum are part of it	77 Assam Colony
18	Boalia part and Shah Makhdum are part of it	78. Poba
18	Boalia part and Shah Makhdum are part of it	79 Poba Rice Mill
18	Boalia part and Shah Makhdum are part of it	80 Ahmad Nagar
18	Boalia part and Shah Makhdum are part of it	81. Firozabad
18	Boalia part and Shah Makhdum are part of it	82 Poba new fringe
18	Boalia part and Shah Makhdum are part of it	83. Poba, TTC
18	Boalia part and Shah Makhdum are part of it	84. Poba Mathpukur
18	Boalia part and Shah Makhdum are part of it	85. Shalbagan (north of the south-east side of the forest office)
19	Boalia	86. Headline Colony
19	Boalia	87. Small forest colony
19	Boalia	88. Small village
19	Boalia	89. Shiroil Colony
19	Boalia	90 Railway Colony
20	Boalia	91. Boalia Para
20	Boalia	92 Sultanabad
21	Boalia	93. Ballavganj
21	Boalia	94. Shiroil
22	Boalia	95. Sagorpara
22	Boalia	96. Rampurbazar
22	Boalia	97. Khansamarchak
22	Boalia	98. Ghoramara (the eastern part of the road along the Kumarapara road)
23	Boalia	99 Explanation
23	Boalia	100. Ramchandrapur (west)
24	Boalia	101. Bad Kajala (western)
24	Boalia	102 Ramchandrapur (including Purbash Ahmadpur)
25	Boalia	103. Talaimari (west)
25	Boalia	104. Raniagar (southern part)
26	Boalia	105. Meherchandi
26	Boalia	106. Nostalgia
26	Boalia	107. Chakpar Meherchandi
27	Motihar is part and Boalia part	108. Engineering College (BI)
27	Motihar is part and Boalia part	109. Tikapara
27	Motihar is part and Boalia part	110. Mirerchak
27	Motihar is part and Boalia part	111. Raninagar (northern part)
27	Motihar is part and Boalia part	112 Devi Shipping
27	Motihar is part and Boalia part	113. Baliapukur
27	Motihar is part and Boalia part	114. Shiroil Mathpukur
27	Motihar is part and Boalia part	115. Over the groom
28	Motihar	116. Cajala
28	Motihar	117. Dharampur
28	Motihar	118. Talaimari (eastern part)
28	Motihar	119. Bad kajla (eastern part)
28	Motihar	120 Grazing land
29	Motihar	121 Sahtbariya
29	Motihar	122 Khojapur
29	Motihar	123 Dashmari
29	Motihar	124.Care Satbariya
29	Motihar	125.Sishampur Dashmari
30	Motihar	126. University campus
30	Motihar	127. Mirzapur
30	Motihar	128. Mascata Dighi (Mehrchandi)
30	Motihar	129 Budhapara
30	Motihar	130 Mohanpur
30	Motihar	131. Fruit garden
30	Motihar	132. Agricultural Firm
30	Motihar	133 Science and Industrial Laboratory
30	Motihar	134. Meherchandi Badhupara

Ward and councillor list
#	Ward	Councillor	Party
1	Ward-1	Vacant	TBD
2	Ward-2	Vacant	TBD
3	Ward-3	Vacant	TBD
4	Ward-4	Vacant	TBD
5	Ward-5	Vacant	TBD
6	Ward-6	Vacant	TBD
7	Ward-7	Vacant	TBD
8	Ward-8	Vacant	TBD
9	Ward-9	Vacant	TBD
10	Ward-10	Vacant	TBD
11	Ward-11	Vacant	TBD
12	Ward-12	Vacant	TBD
13	Ward-13	Vacant	TBD
14	Ward-14	Vacant	TBD
15	Ward-15	Vacant	TBD
16	Ward-16	Vacant	TBD
17	Ward-17	Vacant	TBD
18	Ward-18	Vacant	TBD
19	Ward-19	Vacant	TBD
20	Ward-20	Vacant	TBD
21	Ward-21	Vacant	TBD
22	Ward-22	Vacant	TBD
23	Ward-23	Vacant	TBD
24	Ward-24	Vacant	TBD
25	Ward-25	Vacant	TBD
26	Ward-26	Vacant	TBD
27	Ward-27	Vacant	TBD
28	Ward-28	Vacant	TBD
29	Ward-29	Vacant	TBD
30	Ward-30	Vacant	TBD
Reserved Women's Councillor
31	Reserved women's seat-1	Vacant	TBD
32	Reserved women's seat-2	Vacant	TBD
33	Reserved women's seat-3	Vacant	TBD
34	Reserved women's seat-4	Vacant	TBD
35	Reserved women's seat-5	Vacant	TBD
36	Reserved women's seat-6	Vacant	TBD
37	Reserved women's seat-7	Vacant	TBD
38	Reserved women's seat-8	Vacant	TBD
39	Reserved women's seat-9	Vacant	TBD
40	Reserved women's seat-10	Vacant	TBD

== List of mayors ==
Former Rajshahi City Corporation mayor and administrator's list:

Political parties

- Bangladesh Nationalist Party
- Bangladesh Awami League
- Jatiya Party

Other factions

- Independent

Status

- Acting Mayor, Administrator and Divisional Commissioner

No.	Portrait	Name (Birth–Death)	Designation	Election	Term of office			Political party	Reference
No.	Portrait	Name (Birth–Death)	Designation	Election	Took office	Left office	Time in office	Political party	Reference
1		Advocate; M. Abdul Hadi (?–?)	Administrator	—	13 August 1987	11 September 1988	2 years, 245 days	Bangladesh Awami League	
1		Advocate; M. Abdul Hadi (?–?)	Mayor	—	11 September 1988	15 April 1990	2 years, 245 days	Bangladesh Awami League	
2		Durul Huda (1955–2020)	Mayor	–	16 April 1990	6 November 1990	205 days	Jatiya Party	
–		Mesbah Uddin Ahmed (?–?)	Acting Mayor	–	6 November 1990	9 December 1990	33 days	Independent	
–		Mohammad Saidur Rahman (?–?)	Divisional Commissioner	–	15 December 1990	8 May 1991	144 days	Independent	
–		NA Habibullah (?–?)	Divisional Commissioner	–	8 May 1991	21 May 1991	13 days	Independent	
3		Mizanur Rahman Minu (born 1958)	Mayor	—	21 May 1991	30 December 1993	2 years, 223 days	Bangladesh Nationalist Party	
–		M Aminul Islam (?–?)	Divisional Commissioner	–	30 December 1993	11 March 1994	71 days	Independent	
4		Mizanur Rahman Minu (born 1958)	Mayor (First elected)	1994 1999; 2004	11 March 1995	11 June 2007	13 years, 92 days	Bangladesh Nationalist Party	
–		Md. Rezwan Nobi Dudu (?–?)	Acting Mayor	—	11 June 2007	14 September 2008	1 year, 95 days	Bangladesh Nationalist Party	
5		A. H. M. Khairuzzaman Liton (born 1959)	Mayor	2008	14 September 2008	5 September 2013	4 years, 356 days	Bangladesh Awami League	
6		Mosaddek Hossain Bulbul (born 1965)	Mayor	2013	18 September 2013	30 June 2018	4 years, 285 days	Bangladesh Nationalist Party	
7		A. H. M. Khairuzzaman Liton (born 1959)	Mayor	2018; 2023	30 July 2018	19 August 2024	6 years, 20 days	Bangladesh Awami League	
–		Dr. Dewan Muhammad Humayun Kabir (?–?)	Divisional Commissioner & Administrator	–	19 August 2024	2 December 2024	105 days	Independent	
–		Khandkar Azim Ahmed (?–?)	Divisional Commissioner & Administrator	–	2 December 2024	18 November 2025	351 days	Independent	
–		Dr. A. N. M. Bazlur Rashid (?–?)	Divisional Commissioner	–	18 November 2025	14 March 2026	117 days	Independent	
–		Md. Mahfuzur Rahman Riton (?–?)	Administrator	–	14 March 2026	Incumbent	166 days	Bangladesh Nationalist Party	

== Past Elections ==
=== Election Result 2023 ===
Rajshahi Mayoral Election 2023
Party	Candidate	Votes	%	±%
AL	A. H. M. Khairuzzaman Liton	160,290	81.87	+30.04
IAB	Murshid Alam	13,483	6.89	New
Zaker Party	Latif Anwar	11,713	5.98	New
JP(E)	Saiful Islam Swapan	10,272	5.25	New
Majority		146,807	74.98	+47.60
Turnout		195,758	55.63	▼20.65pp
Registered electors		351,982		
AL hold				

=== Election Result 2018 ===
Rajshahi Mayoral Election 2018
Party	Candidate	Votes	%	±%
AL	A. H. M. Khairuzzaman Liton	166,394	51.83	+12.89
BNP	Mosaddek Hossain Bulbul	78,492	24.45	−36.52
Majority		87,902	27.38%	+5.35
Turnout		244,886	76.28	▲1.35pp
Registered electors		321,046		
AL gain from BNP				

=== Election Result 2013 ===
Rajshahi Mayoral Election 2013
Party	Candidate	Votes	%	±%
BNP	Mosaddek Hossain Bulbul	131,058	60.97	New
AL	A. H. M. Khairuzzaman Liton	83,726	38.94	New
Majority		47,332	22.03	New
Turnout		214,784	74.93	New
Registered electors		286,917		
BNP gain from AL				
