= Mohsin Government High School =

Mohsin Government High School may refer to:

- Hazi Mohammad Mohsin Government High School, a school in Chittagong, Bangladesh
- Haji Muhammad Mohsin Government High School, Rajshahi, a school in Rajshahi, Bangladesh
