= Durul Huda =

Bangladeshi politician (1955–2020)

2nd Mayor of Rajshahi
- In office 16 April 1990 – 6 November 1990
- Preceded by: M. Abdul Hadi
- Succeeded by: Mesbah Uddin Ahmmed

Member of Parliament for Rajshahi-1
- In office 1988–1990
- Preceded by: Mujibur Rahman
- Succeeded by: Aminul Haque

Personal details
- Born: June 1955 Shibganj, Chapai Nawabganj, Rajshahi, East Pakistan
- Died: 3 February 2020 (aged 64) Square Hospital, Dhaka, Bangladesh
- Party: Jatiya Party (Ershad)

Durul Huda (June 1955 – 3 February 2020) was a Bangladeshi freedom fighter and politician belonging to Jatiya Party. He was a member of the Jatiya Sangsad. He was also the mayor of Rajshahi City Corporation.

== Biography ==
Huda was born in June 1955 at Mollatola in Shibganj of Chapai Nawabganj. He took part in the Liberation War of Bangladesh in 1971.

Huda was elected as a member of the Jatiya Sangsad from Rajshahi-1 in 1988. He was the mayor of Rajshahi City Corporation from 16 April 1990 to 6 November 1990. His mayoral post was equivalent to the status of deputy minister. He was also the chairman of Rajshahi Zilla Parishad.

Huda died on 3 February 2020 at Square Hospital in Dhaka at the age of 64.
