= Mujibur Rahman (Rajshahi politician) =

Bangladesh Jamaat-e-Islami politician

- মুজিবুর রহমান

Member of Parliament
- Incumbent
- Assumed office 17 February 2026
- Preceded by: Omor Faruk Chowdhury
- Constituency: Rajshahi-1
- In office 7 May 1986 – 3 March 1988
- Preceded by: Shahjahan Miah
- Succeeded by: Durul Huda
- Constituency: Rajshahi-1

Naib-e-Ameer of Bangladesh Jamaat-e-Islami
- Incumbent
- Assumed office 13 December 2022
- Ameer: Shafiqur Rahman

President of Bangladesh Sramik Kalyan Federation
- In office 2002–2014
- Preceded by: Ansar Ali
- Succeeded by: Mia Golam Parwar

Personal details
- Born: 1955 (age 70–71) Tanore Upazila, Rajshahi District, East Bengal
- Party: Bangladesh Jamaat-e-Islami
- Children: 2 sons, 2 daughters

Mujibur Rahman (Bengali: মুজিবুর রহমান) is a Bangladeshi politician who is currently serving as a member of parliament for the Rajshahi-1 constituency. He is also the Naib-e-Ameer of Bangladesh Jamaat-e-Islami and formerly served as the president of the Bangladesh Sramik Kalyan Federation.

He previously served as a member of parliament for Rajshahi-1, holding office from May 1986 to March 1988.

== Early life ==
Born on 1 January 1955 in Alatuli village, Godagari Upazila (Rajshahi District), he pursued higher education at the University of Rajshahi, completing Honours and an MA in English literature. He also earned a diploma in Arabic and Persian from the same university.

After completing his studies, Mujibur Rahman passed the BCS education cadre examination, but chose not to enter government service, aiming instead to dedicate himself more fully to Islamic social and political work. He later built his professional career as a professor in the English department at a non-government college—a background that has remained central to his public identity

== Political career ==
Within Jamaat-e-Islami, he is recognized as a senior leader and has held the role of Nayeb-e-Ameer (vice president). During periods of political uncertainty, he has also carried major organizational responsibilities; for example, Jamaat announced that he would serve as acting ameer following the arrest of the party's ameer in December 2022. (Jamaat had also previously announced him as acting ameer in October 2017 under similar circumstances.)

In recent political reporting related to national elections and constituency activity, he has been described as the Jamaat-nominated figure associated with Rajshahi-1, including public remarks made during nomination-related events in late 2025.
