= H. M. A. Gaffar =

Bangladeshi politician (died 2020)

Abdul Gaffar

Minister of Civil Aviation and Tourism
- In office 19 July 1989 – 9 October 1990
- Preceded by: Ziauddin Ahmed Bablu
- Succeeded by: Rafiqul Islam

State Minister of Youth and Sports
- In office 10 December 1988 – 19 July 1989
- Preceded by: Sheikh Shahidul Islam
- Succeeded by: Abul Khair Chowdhury

State Minister of Commerce
- In office 1 January 1988 – 28 December 1988
- Preceded by: Mohammad Abdul Munim (As Minister)
- Succeeded by: M. A. Sattar

Member of Parliament for Khulna-5
- In office 1986–1988
- Preceded by: Prafulla Kumar Shil
- Succeeded by: Himself
- In office 1988–1991
- Preceded by: Himself
- Succeeded by: Salhuddin Yusuf

Personal details
- Born: 11 August 1936 Khulna, Bengal, British India
- Died: 12 April 2020 (aged 83) CMH, Dhaka, Bangladesh
- Party: Jatiya Party (Ershad)
- Awards: Bir Uttom

Military service
- Allegiance: Pakistan (before 1971); Bangladesh
- Branch/service: Pakistan Army; Bangladesh Army
- Years of service: 1968 - 1976
- Rank: Lieutenant Colonel
- Unit: East Bengal Regiment
- Commands: Deputy Commander of K Force; CO of 4th East Bengal Regiment; CO of 22nd East Bengal Regiment; AQ of 24th Infantry Division
- Battles/wars: Bangladesh Liberation War

Haldar Mohammad Abdul Gaffar (11 August 1936 – 12 April 2020), popularly known as HMA Gaffar, was a Bangladeshi politician, freedom fighter, and lieutenant colonel of the Bangladesh Army. He served as a member of the Jatiya Sangsad and was a state minister of Commerce.

== Early life and education ==
Gaffar was born on 21 March 1943 to a Bengali family of Haldars in the village of Arazi-Sajiara in Dumuria, Khulna District. He was the son of Haldar Mohammad Kayqobad. He passed his matriculation from Gutudia High School in 1959. He completed his intermediate from Brajalal College in 1961. He also obtained his Bachelor's of Arts degree from the same college in 1963. In 1965 he obtained a Bachelor of Physical Education (B.P.Ed) Degree from Government Physical Education College, Dhaka. He joined the Pakistan Military Academy in 1967.

== Career ==
He joined the Pakistan Army in 1967 and was commissioned as a second lieutenant in the 4th East Bengal Regiment in 1968. Six months after his commission, he was promoted to the rank of lieutenant. In 1970 he was promoted to the rank of captain. In the same year his unit, the 4th East Bengal Regiment, was transferred to Comilla Cantonment. He was appointed the quartermaster of his battalion. He revolted from the Pakistan Army in 1971 and joined the liberation war of Bangladesh. He fought under Major Khaled Mosharraf in Sector 2. Later, after the formation of K Force, he served as the commanding officer of the 4th East Bengal Regiment. He was awarded Bir Uttom for his contribution to the Liberation War of Bangladesh.

After the independence of Bangladesh, he joined the Bangladesh Army. In 1972 he was promoted to the rank of major and was appointed the brigade major of the 46th Independent Infantry Brigade. He went to the United Kingdom and West Germany for military training in 1974. In 1975 he was promoted to the rank of lieutenant colonel and was appointed the first commanding officer of 22nd East Bengal Regiment. He took part in the 3 November coup. In 1976 he was sent into forced retirement.

Gaffar was elected to parliament from Khulna-5 as a Jatiya Party candidate in 1986 and 1988.

Gaffar was a veteran of the Bangladesh Liberation War. He retired as a lieutenant colonel from the Bangladesh Army. He was a member of the Central University of Science and Technology trustee board. He was awarded Bir Uttom for gallantry.

== Personal life ==
He was married to Hosne Ara Begum. They had 2 daughters and 2 sons.

== Death ==
Gaffar died on 12 April 2020 in Combined Military Hospital.
