= Haji Muhammad Mohsin Government High School, Rajshahi =

- হাজী মুহম্মদ মুহসীন সরকারি উচ্চ বিদ্যালয়, রাজশাহী

Location
- Srirampur, Rajshahi 6000; Bangladesh; 24.3664°N 88.5885°E

Information
- Former name: Rajshahi Government Madrasha
- Type: Public School
- Established: 1874
- Founder: Government of Bengal
- School board: Rajshahi Education Board
- School district: Rajshahi
- School number: 127023
- Headmaster: Md Mamunur Rahman Rana
- Grades: 1st - 10th
- Gender: Boys
- Enrollment: ≈ 750
- Education system: boys only
- Language: Bengali
- Campus size: 12 acres
- Campus type: Urban
- Colors: White, Khaki and Navy blue
- Yearbook: Barshiki
- Demonym(s): Mohsinian(s)
- Website: www.hmmghsraj.edu.bd

Haji Muhammad Mohsin Government High School, Rajshahi, formerly the Rajshahi Government Madrasha is a public secondary school located in Rajshahi in Bangladesh. It was founded by the Mohsin Endowment in 1874. During its establishment, the institution was established as a Madrasa. Later it was converted into a secondary school. In 2019, it was named after Muhammad Mohsin.

== History ==
=== Founding stage ===
Haji Muhammad Mohsin Government High School was established in 1874 by the then Government of Bengal under the supervision of Nawab Abdul Latif with funding from Muhammad Mohsin. Muhammad Mohsin was a renowned philanthropist from the Indian subcontinent. He registered an endowment in 1806 at Hooghly for Muslim education and social development. This endowment was created with 1 lakh 56 thousand Taka and it is known as the Mohsin Endowment. In 1810, the Board of Revenue appointed a Superintendent for the Mohsin Endowment. Later in 1817, the then government took over responsibility. On the recommendation of Nawab Abdul Latif, the George Campbell government decided in 1873 that a portion of the endowment’s income was to be expended on establishing educational institutions in Dhaka, Chittagong and Rajshahi.

=== 1874-1947 ===
Haji Muhammad Mohsin Government High School was founded as Dorse Nizamia Senior Madrasah and it was recognized by Calcutta University. At the beginning it started its journey with a few rooms in a building located inside Rajshahi College. The first superintendent of this institution was the renowned Islamic philosopher Maulana Abdul Qadir. In 1883 it became a junior madrasa like other madrasas of Bengal. In 1884, the Haji Muhammad Mohsin Building and Fuller Mohammedan Building was built inside Rajshahi College for it. When this institution moved to its present location. The two buildings within Rajshahi College were handed over to the College. Owing to lack of students, the Government of Bengal changed the curriculum of madrasas under the Reform Madrasa Scheme in 1914 and introduced new educational institutions called High Madrasas and Junior Madrasas equals to secondary schools. This Madrasah was included in New Scheme Madrasah and the name of the institution became Rajshahi Madrasah. In 1930, when the Government of Bengal recognized the teaching of Arabic through English medium, Rajshahi Madrasah was renamed as Rajshahi High Madrasah. From March of that year, the institution was managed by a government committee under the Bengal Education Service Officer. In 1931, the post of Lecturer in Arabic was created and received the first permanent recognition of the Dhaka Education Board. In 1937, the post of Superintendent was promoted to the rank of Principal.

=== 1947-1971 ===
In 1959, the Government of East Pakistan converted all madrassas into general institution and nationalized by forming Sharif Education Commission, 1959. This madrasa was converted into a school under that commission. Rajshahi Education Board was established in 1961, the institution came under Rajshahi Education Board from Dhaka Education Board.

=== 1971- Present ===
==== Change of name ====
The educational institution managing the school desired to remove the word madrasa from the school's name. A madrasa curriculum was in operation under the University of Calcutta until 1959 but since coming under the Sharif Education Commission a general education curriculum had been in place. In 2009, the school sent a letter to the Ministry of Education proposing the name be changed. The relevant parties agreed to the proposal in 2012 but the change was not implemented. Three years later students and parents protested about the delay. They said that inclusion of madrasa had religious connotations and was detrimental in attracting good students and teachers. Further, school leavers were embarrassed by the school's name when applying for admission to higher education establishments. Finally, on September 2, 2019, the Ministry of Education officially changed the name of Rajshahi Government Madrasha to Haji Muhammad Mohsin Government High School in an order signed by the President of Bangladesh. The then Member of Parliament for Rajshahi-2 constituency, Fazle Hossain Badsha played a leading role in achieving the change.

==== Grounds ====
The school is set within 12 acres (4.9 ha) of grounds sometimes used for political rallies.

== Notable alumni ==
- M. Abdur Rahim
- Muhammad Abdul Hye
- Shafiqur Rahman Badsha

== Gallery ==
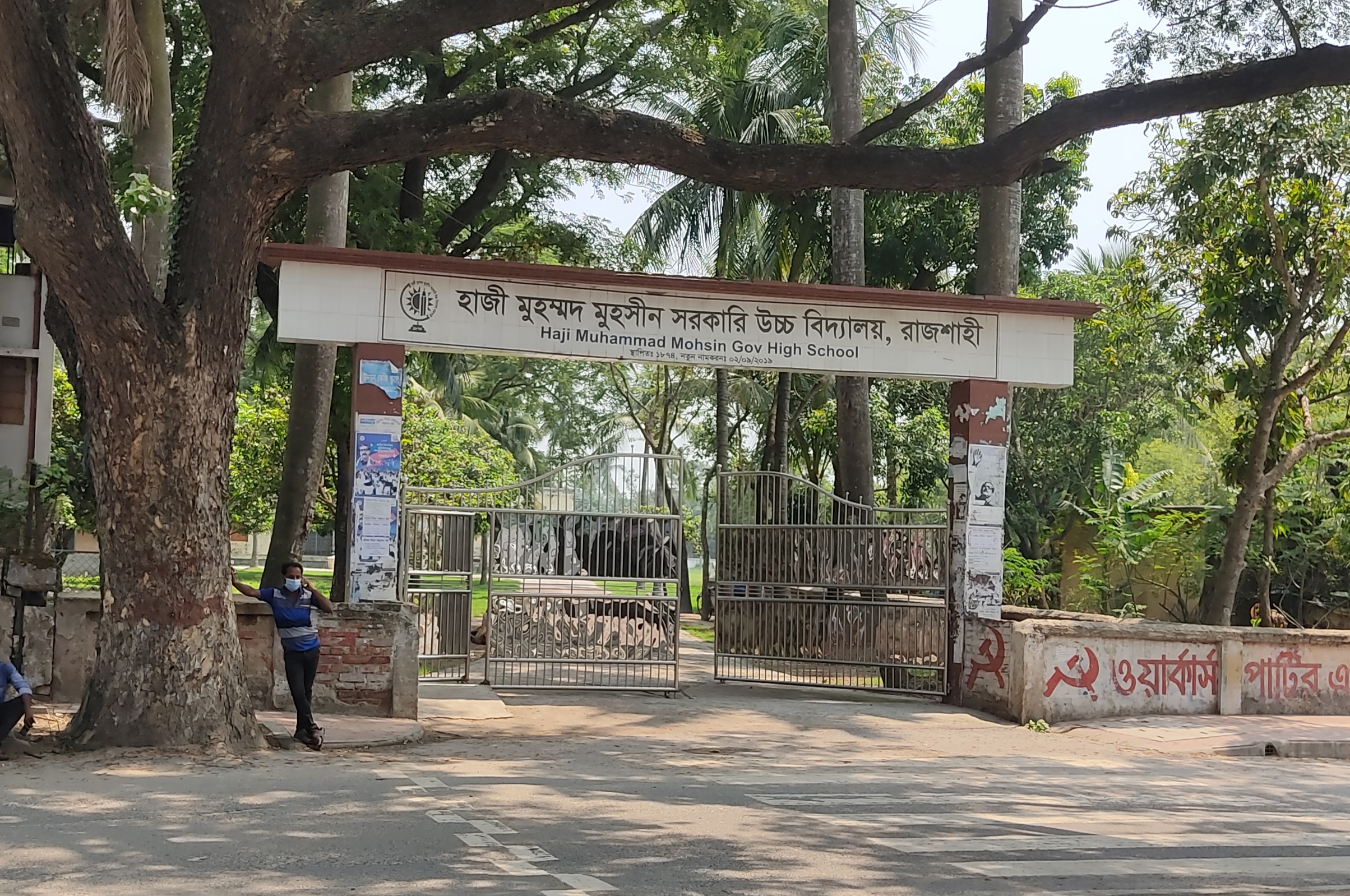
Main Gate

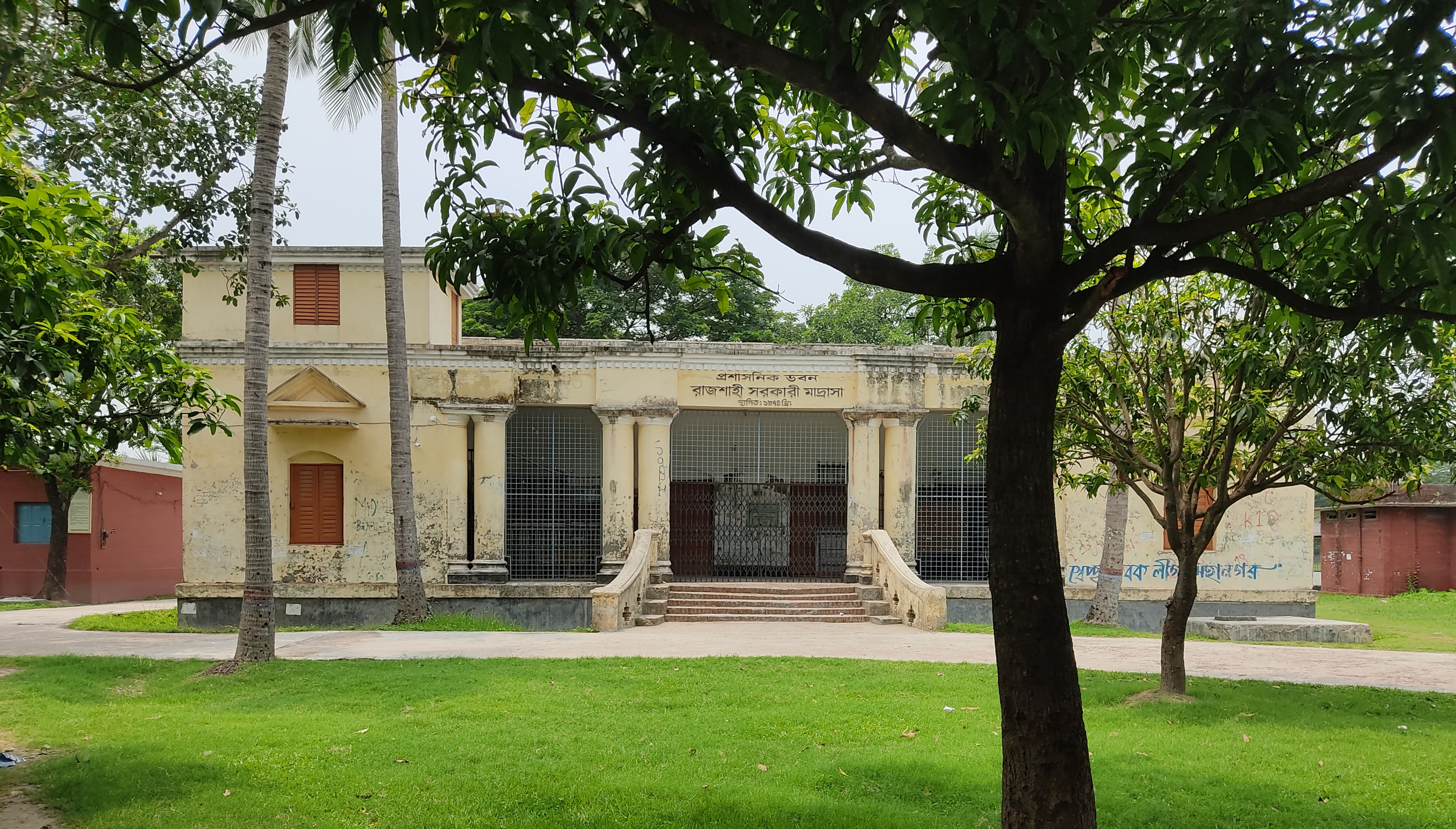
Administration Building

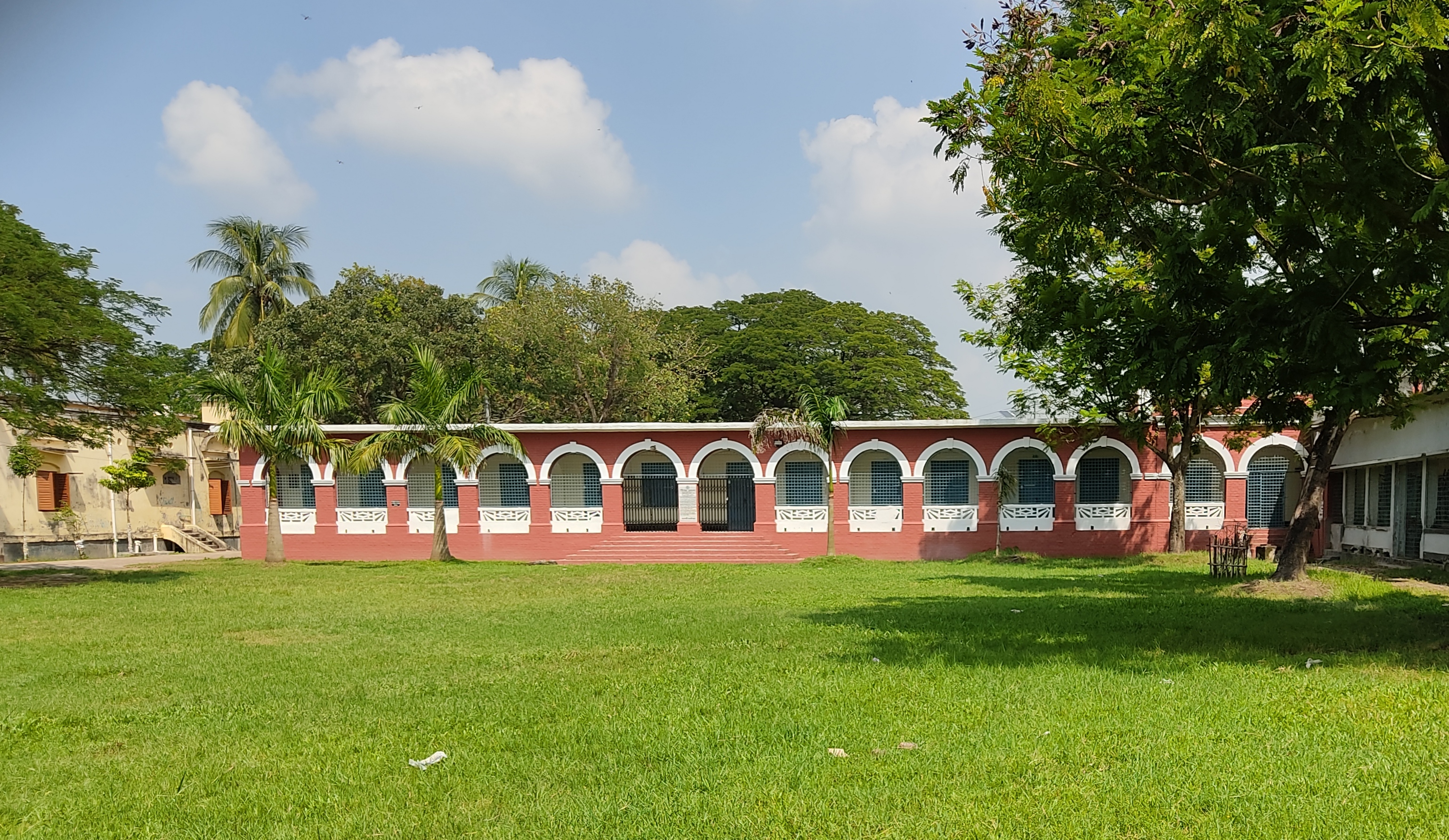
Shahid Sattar-Nurul Building

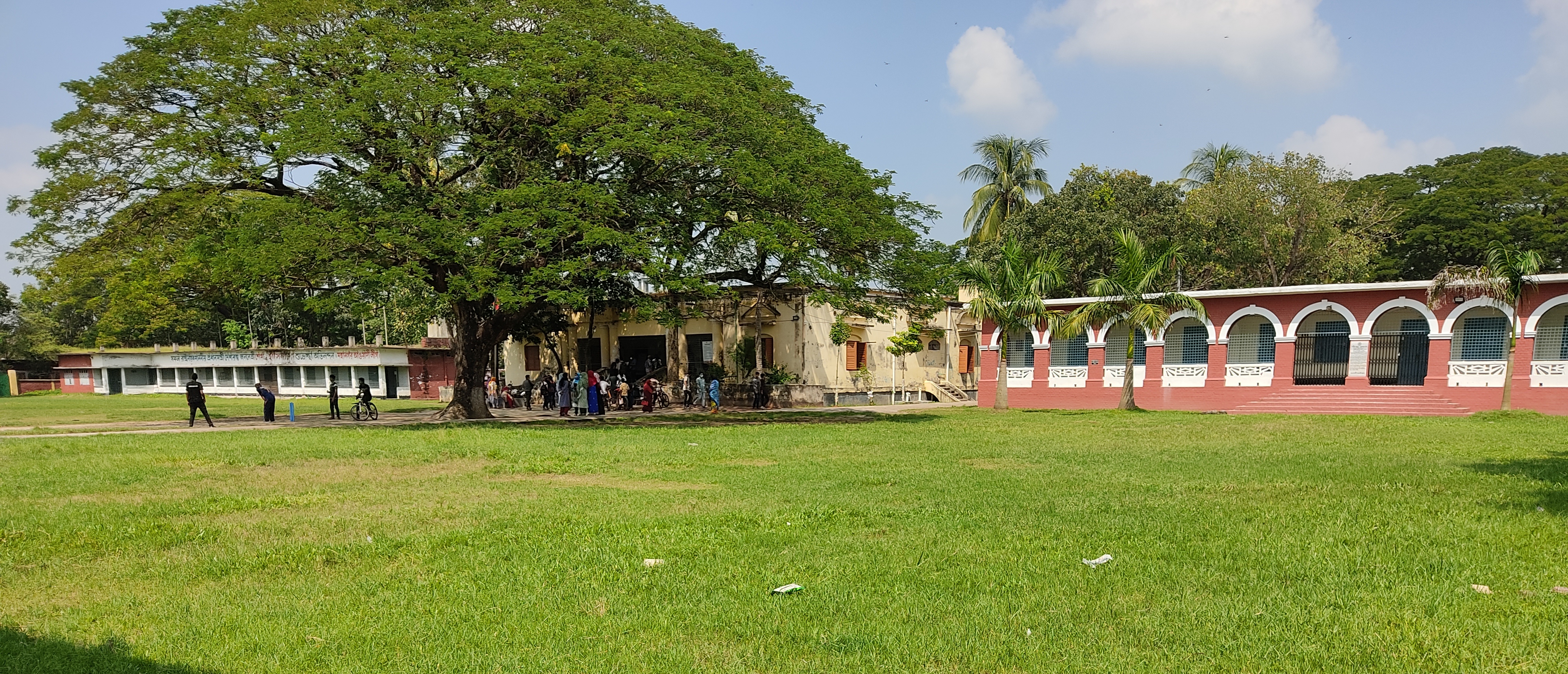
Sports Field

== See also ==
- Rajshahi College
- Government Hazi Mohammad Mohsin College, Chittagong
- Kabi Nazrul Government College
- Rajshahi Collegiate School
