= Rajshahi-1 =

Constituency of Bangladesh's Jatiya Sangsad

Coordinates: 24.47°N 88.32°E

- Constituency for the Jatiya Sangsad
- District: Rajshahi District
- Division: Rajshahi Division
- Electorate: 468,780 (2026)

Current constituency
- Created: 1973
- Party: Bangladesh Jamaat-e-Islami
- Member: Mujibur Rahman
- ← 51 Naogaon-6 53 Rajshahi-2 →

Rajshahi-1 is a constituency represented in the Jatiya Sangsad (National Parliament) of Bangladesh since 2026 by Mujibur Rahman of the Bangladesh Jamaat-e-Islami.

== Boundaries ==
The constituency encompasses Godagari and Tanore upazilas.

== History ==
The constituency was created for the first general elections in newly independent Bangladesh, held in 1973.

== Members of Parliament ==
Election	Member	Party
1973	Moin Uddin Ahmed	Awami League
1979	Shahjahan Miah	Bangladesh Nationalist Party
Major Boundary Changes
1986	Mujibur Rahman	Bangladesh Jamaat-e-Islami
1988	Durul Huda	Jatiya Party
1991	Aminul Haque	Bangladesh Nationalist Party
2008	Omar Faruk Chowdhury	Awami League
2014	Omar Faruk Chowdhury	Awami League
2018	Omar Faruk Chowdhury	Awami League
2024	Omar Faruk Chowdhury	Awami League
2026	Mujibur Rahman	Bangladesh Jamaat-e-Islami

== Elections ==
=== Elections in the 2020s ===
General election 2026: Rajshahi-1
Party	Candidate	Votes	%	±%
Jamaat	Mujibur Rahman			
BNP	Md. Sharif Uddin			
Majority				
Turnout				
Registered electors		468,780		
Jamaat gain from AL				

General Election 2024: Rajshahi-1
Party	Candidate	Votes	%	±%
AL	Omar Faruk Chowdhury	103,592	50.8	N/A
Independent	Golam Rabbani	92,419	45.4	N/A
Independent	Mahiya Mahi	9,009	4.4	N/A
Majority		11,173	5.4	
Turnout				
Registered electors				
AL hold				

=== Elections in the 2010s ===
Omar Faruk Chowdhury was re-elected unopposed in the 2014 general election after opposition parties withdrew their candidacies in a boycott of the election.

=== Elections in the 2000s ===
General Election 2008: Rajshahi-1
Party	Candidate	Votes	%	±%
AL	Omar Faruk Chowdhury	146,786	53.1	+15.0
BNP	Enamul Haque	129,450	46.8	−12.3
Bangladesh Kalyan Party	Salahuddin Biswas	366	0.1	N/A
Majority		17,336	6.3	−14.7
Turnout		276,602	93.0	+4.4
AL gain from BNP				

General Election 2001: Rajshahi-1
Party	Candidate	Votes	%	±%
BNP	Aminul Haque	130,631	59.1	+11.4
AL	Omar Faruk Chowdhury	84,185	38.1	+6.9
IJOF	Md. Jalal Uddin	5,022	2.3	N/A
WPB	Rafiqul Islam	915	0.4	N/A
Independent	Aminul Islam	298	0.1	N/A
Jatiya Party (M)	Anowar Iqbal Badal	88	0.0	N/A
Majority		46,446	21.0	+4.5
Turnout		221,139	88.6	+1.5
BNP hold				

=== Elections in the 1990s ===
General Election June 1996: Rajshahi-1
Party	Candidate	Votes	%	±%
BNP	Aminul Haque	83,994	47.7	+4.8
AL	Md. Alal Uddin	55,003	31.2	+1.5
Jamaat	Mujibur Rahman	28,453	16.2	−8.8
JP(E)	Rabeya Bhuiyan	6,915	3.9	+2.4
Jatiya Samajtantrik Dal-JSD	Mozibur	631	0.4	N/A
Independent	M. M. Sajedun Nabi	448	0.3	N/A
Gano Forum	Bholanath Majhi	276	0.2	N/A
JSD	Abdul Ohab	270	0.2	N/A
Oikkya Prakriyya	Md. Abdus Salam	112	0.1	N/A
Majority		28,991	16.5	+3.3
Turnout		176,102	87.1	+12.8
BNP hold				

General Election 1991: Rajshahi-1
Party	Candidate	Votes	%	±%
BNP	Aminul Haque	61,975	42.9	
AL	Md. Mohsin	42,897	29.7	
Jamaat	Mujibur Rahman	36,058	25.0	
JP(E)	Durul Huda	2,108	1.5	
Independent	Muhammad Lutfar Rahman	1,344	0.9	
Majority		19,078	13.2	
Turnout		144,382	74.3	
BNP gain from				
