= Narayon Chandra Chanda =

Bangladeshi Politician and Parliamentarian

Narayan Chandra Chanda
- নারায়ন চন্দ্র চন্দ
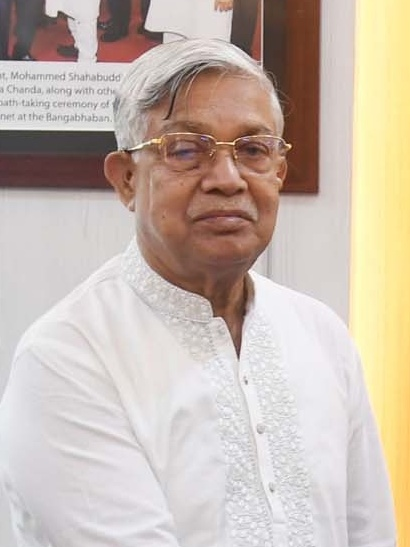
- Chandra in 2024

Minister of Land
- In office 11 January 2024 – 6 August 2024
- Preceded by: Saifuzzaman Chowdhury
- Succeeded by: Dr. Muhammad Yunus (Adviser)

Member of the Bangladesh Parliament for Khulna-5
- In office 25 January 2009 – 6 August 2024
- Preceded by: Mia Golam Parwar
- Succeeded by: Mohammad Ali Asghar Lobby
- In office 2000 – 13 July 2001
- Preceded by: Salahuddin Yusuf

Minister of Fisheries and Livestock
- In office 2 January 2018 – 7 January 2019
- Preceded by: Mohammad Sayedul Haque
- Succeeded by: SM Rezaul Karim

State Minister of Fisheries and Livestock
- In office 25 January 2014 – 2 January 2018
- Succeeded by: Ashraf Ali Khan Khasru

Personal details
- Born: 12 March 1945 (age 81) Khulna, Bengal Province, British India
- Party: Bangladesh Awami League
- Occupation: Politician

Narayan Chandra Chanda (born 12 March 1945) is a Bangladesh Awami League politician and a former Minister of Land served in 2024. He is a former Jatiya Sangsad member representing the Khulna-5 constituency, and a former Minister of Fisheries and Livestock.

== Early life ==
Mr. Chanda was born on 12 March 1945 in Dumuria Upazila of Khulna district.

== Education ==
He studied at Banda High School and Dumuria NGC & NCK High School, and then completed his HSC at Govt. Brajal (BL) College, Khulna. Then Mr. Chanda obtained BA (Honours) and MA in Political Science from the University of Rajshahi in 1966 and 1967 respectively. Afterwards he completed Bachelor of Education as well.

== Career ==
Mr. Chanda joined as the Headmaster of Shahos-Noakati High School in Dumuria, Khulna in 1967. Then since 1973 till 2005 he had served as the Headmaster of Dumuria NGC & NCK (Minister for Fisheries and Livestocks) Pilot High School, which was established in 1924.

He was elected the chairman of Bhandarpara Union Council in Dumuria upazila in the first union council elections of Bangladesh. He had been elected Chairman for six consecutive terms until he became an MP.

Mr. Chanda was elected a Member of Parliament from the Dumuria-Fultala-Gilatola Cantonment (Khulna-5) constituency in the by-elections held on 27 December 2000 after the death of the then Health Minister Salahuddin Yusuf. He was again elected a Member of Parliament in the 9th parliamentary election of 2008. Then Mr Chanda was further elected in the 10th, 11th and 12th parliamentary elections respectively in January 2014, December 2018, and January 2024. He was sworn in as the State Minister for Fisheries and Livestock in Bangladesh on January 12, 2014. Later served as the Minister of Fisheries and Livestock from January 2018. Afterwards Mr. Chanda was assigned to the position of the Minister of Land in January 2024. As Land Minister, he has worked on the Land Zoning Project and the Bangladesh Digital Survey Program, aiming for smart land management.

Following the fall of the Sheikh Hasina led Awami League government, Mr. Chanda was detained by the Border Guard Bangladesh on 6 October 2024 in Jhenaidah while allegedly fleeing to India.
