= Shafiqur Rahman Badsha =

Bangladeshi politician

- শফিকুর রহমান বাদশা
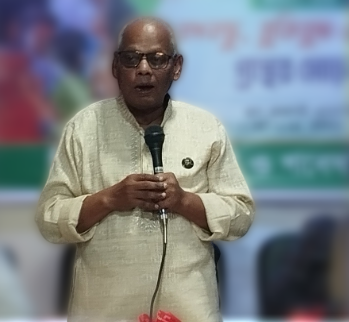

Member of the Bangladesh Parliament for Rajshahi-2
- In office 30 January 2024 – 6 August 2024
- Preceded by: Fazle Hossain Badsha
- Succeeded by: Mizanur Rahman Minu

Personal details
- Born: 9 February 1951 (age 75)
- Party: Independent
- Education: MA in Political Science
- Alma mater: University of Rajshahi

Shafiqur Rahman Badsha (born 9 February 1951) is a Bangladeshi politician. He is a former member of Jatiya Sangsad as an independent candidate from Rajshahi-2 elected on the 2024 Bangladeshi general election. He was elected by defeating the incumbent Workers Party candidate Fazle Hossain Badsha by 23,718 votes.

== Education ==
Shafiqur Rahman Badsha passed his SSC Examination in 1964 from Rajshahi Government Madrasha (present-day Haji Muhammad Mohsin Government High School). He passed MA from University of Rajshahi in Political Science in 1972.
