= Khalid Ali Mia =

Bangladeshi politician

- খালেদ আলী মিঞা

Member of Parliament from Undivided Rajshahi-2
- In office 1973–1975
- Preceded by: Start (gain independence)
- Succeeded by: Syed Manzur Hossain

Personal details
- Born: 21 February 1932 (age 94) Chapai Nawabganj District, British India
- Died: 2 April 1981 (aged 49) Rohanpur
- Party: Bangladesh Awami League

Khalid Ali Mia (21 February 1932 – 2 April 1981) was a Bangladesh Awami League politician. He was elected a member of parliament from undivided Rajshahi-2 in 1973. He was one of the organizers of the Liberation War of Bangladesh.

== Early life ==
Khalid Ali Mia was born on 21 February 1932 in Gomostapur Upazila of Chapai Nawabganj District. His father is Yunus Ali and mother Rebia Begum.

== Career ==
Khalid Ali Mia was an organizer of the Liberation War of Bangladesh. He was the president of the Chapainawabganj district Awami League. He was elected to parliament from undivided Rajshahi-2 a Bangladesh Awami League candidate in the 1973 Bangladeshi general election.

== Death ==
Khalid Ali Mia died on 2 April 1981.
