= Mohammad Ali Asghar Lobby =

Bangladeshi politician

- মোহাম্মদ আলি আসগার লবি

Member of Parliament
- Incumbent
- Assumed office 17 February 2026
- Preceded by: Narayon Chandra Chanda
- Constituency: Khulna-5
- In office 26 November 2001 – 29 October 2006
- Preceded by: Sheikh Razzak Ali
- Succeeded by: Nazrul Islam Manju
- Constituency: Khulna-2

President of the Bangladesh Cricket Board
- In office 26 November 2001 – 14 November 2006
- Preceded by: M Akmal Hossain
- Succeeded by: Abdul Aziz

President of Asian Cricket Council
- In office 2002–2004
- Preceded by: Tauqir Zia
- Succeeded by: Jagmohan Dalmiya

Personal details
- Born: 1951 (age 74–75) Khulna, East Pakistan now Bangladesh
- Party: Bangladesh Nationalist Party
- Spouse: Khusnad Asghar

Mohammad Ali Asghar Lobby (Bengali: মোহাম্মদ আলি আসগার লবি) is a Bangladeshi politician and former member of the Jatiya Sangsad who represented the Khulna-2 constituency. He has also served as the president of the Bangladesh Cricket Board, contributing to the administration and development of cricket in Bangladesh.

== Career ==
Lobi was elected to parliament in a 2001 by-election for Khulna-2 as a candidate of the Bangladesh Nationalist Party. The seat had been won by Khaleda Zia, Bangladesh Nationalist Party chairperson, in the 2001 general election. She resigned from the seat, having won multiple seats but only being able to occupy one, leading to the by-election. Lobi owned Hawa Bhaban, the political office of Khaleda Zia. He served as the president of the Bangladesh Cricket Board from 2001 to 2006. From 2002 to 2004 he served as the president of the Asian Cricket Council.

== Corruption ==
In October 2007, Lobby was sentenced to 13 years imprisonment for corruption by a special court in Bangladesh. He was jailed for amassing illegal wealth worth up to Tk. 204 million (US$3.5 million) and concealing his income. Lobi was also fined Tk. 1 million and had his illegal property confiscated. Earlier in July of the same year, he was sentenced to 8 years jail for evading taxes of US$2.4 million. His wife, Khusnar Asghar, was also jailed for 3 years for aiding him in his corruption.
