= Khulna-5 =

Bangladeshi parliamentary constituency

Coordinates: 22.81°N 89.42°E

- Constituency for the Jatiya Sangsad
- District: Khulna District
- Division: Khulna Division
- Electorate: 402,798 (2026)

Current constituency
- Created: 1973
- Party: Bangladesh Nationalist Party
- Member: Mohammad Ali Asghar Lobby
- ← 102 Khulna-4 104 Khulna-6 →

Khulna-5 is a constituency represented in the Jatiya Sangsad (National Parliament) of Bangladesh since 2026 by Mohammad Ali Asghar Lobby of the Bangladesh Nationalist Party.

== Boundaries ==
The constituency encompasses Dumuria and Phultala upazilas, Khan Jahan Ali Thana, Gilatala Cantonment, and Atra Gilatala Union.

== History ==
The constituency was created for the first general elections in newly independent Bangladesh, held in 1973.

== Members of Parliament ==
Election	Member	Party
1973	Kuber Chandra Biswas	Awami League
1979	Prafulla Kumar Shil	Awami League
Major Boundary Changes
1986	HMA Gaffar	Jatiya Party (Ershad)
1991	Salhuddin Yusuf	Awami League
Feb 1996	Gazi Abdul Haq	Bangladesh Nationalist Party
Jun 1996	Salhuddin Yusuf	Awami League
2000 by-election	Narayan Chandra Chanda	Awami League
2001	Mia Golam Parwar	Bangladesh Jamaat-e-Islami
2008	Narayan Chandra Chanda	Awami League
2014	Narayan Chandra Chanda	Awami League
2018	Narayan Chandra Chanda	Awami League
2024	Narayan Chandra Chanda	Awami League
2026	Mohammad Ali Asghar Lobby	Bangladesh Nationalist Party

== Elections ==
=== Elections in the 2020s ===
General election 2026: Khulna-5
Party	Candidate	Votes	%	±%
BNP	Mohammad Ali Asghar Lobby	148,854	50.0	+10.2
Jamaat	Mia Golam Parwar	146,246	49.0	−10.2
Majority		2,608	1.0	−88.5
Turnout		301,311	74.9	−5.1
Registered electors		402,798		
BNP gain from AL				

=== Elections in the 2010s ===
Narayan Chandra Chanda was re-elected unopposed in the 2014 general election after opposition parties withdrew their candidacies in a boycott of the election.

=== Elections in the 2000s ===
General Election 2008: Khulna-5
Party	Candidate	Votes	%	±%
AL	Narayan Chandra Chanda	144,600	56.7	+9.3
Jamaat	Mia Golam Parwar	105,312	41.3	−8.3
IAB	Sheikh Jamil Ahmed	3,897	1.5	N/A
United Citizen Movement	Kazi Faruq Ahammd	653	0.3	N/A
BDB	Bidur Kanti Biswas	596	0.2	N/A
Majority		39,288	15.4	+13.3
Turnout		255,058	91.2	+3.8
AL gain from Jamaat				

General Election 2001: Khulna-5
Party	Candidate	Votes	%	±%
Jamaat	Mia Golam Parwar	105,740	49.6	
AL	Narayan Chandra Chanda	101,192	47.4	
IJOF	H. M. A. Rouf	3,820	1.8	N/A
Jatiya Party (M)	Abul Kashem Dablu	1,681	0.8	N/A
WPB	Md. Anser Ali Molla	803	0.4	
Independent	Shabkas Mondal	108	0.1	N/A
Majority		4,548	2.1	
Turnout		213,344	87.4	
Jamaat gain from AL				

Salah Uddin Yusuf died in 2000. Narayan Chandra Chandu was elected in a December 2000 by-election.

=== Elections in the 1990s ===
General Election June 1996: Khulna-5
Party	Candidate	Votes	%	±%
AL	Salahuddin Yusuf	70,184	41.4	−1.9
BNP	Mazidul Islam	45,584	26.9	+4.1
JP(E)	HMA Gaffar	31,339	18.5	+4.2
Jamaat	A. K. M. Gausul Azam	15,960	9.4	−8.6
IOJ	Md. Nazrul Islam	3,832	2.3	N/A
WPB	Hafizur Rahman Bhuiyan	2,086	1.2	N/A
Zaker Party	Md. Sheikh Shahidullah	311	0.2	0.0
Bangladesh Muslim League (Jamir Ali)	M. A. Samad	198	0.1	N/A
Majority		24,600	14.5	−6.0
Turnout		169,494	84.6	+13.3
AL hold				

General Election 1991: Khulna-5
Party	Candidate	Votes	%	±%
AL	Salhuddin Yusuf	63,211	43.3	
BNP	Mazidul Islam	33,239	22.8	
Jamaat	Mia Golam Parwar	26,211	18.0	
JP(E)	HMA Gaffar	20,821	14.3	
UCL	Nazrul Islam	1,766	1.2	
Zaker Party	Md. Moniruzzaman	316	0.2	
Bangladesh Muslim League (Kader)	Abdus Samad	215	0.1	
Jatiya Samajtantrik Dal-JSD	Sk. Hamidur Rahman	126	0.1	
Majority		29,972	20.5	
Turnout		145,905	71.3	
AL gain from JP(E)				
