= Miya Ghulam Parwar =

Bangladeshi politician (born 1959)

Mia Ghulam Parwar
- মিয়া গোলাম পরওয়ার
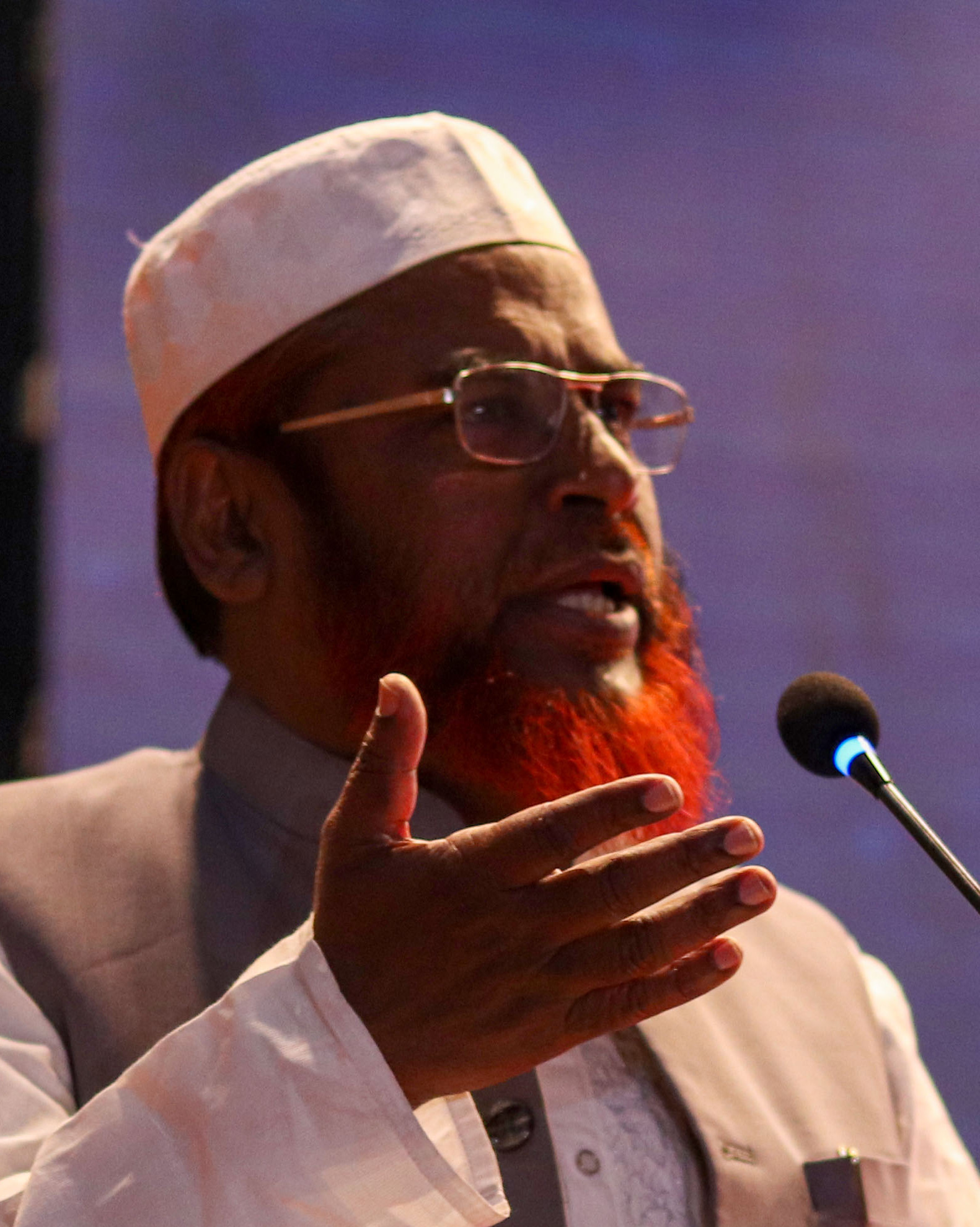
- Parwar in 2024

7th Secretary-General of Bangladesh Jamaat-e-Islami
- Incumbent
- Assumed office 12 November 2019
- Ameer: Shafiqur Rahman
- Preceded by: Shafiqur Rahman

Member of Parliament
- In office 1 October 2001 – 29 October 2006
- Preceded by: Narayon Chandra Chanda
- Succeeded by: Narayon Chandra Chanda
- Constituency: Khulna-5

President of Bangladesh Sramik Kalyan Federation
- In office 1 November 2015 – 12 November 2019
- Preceded by: Mujibur Rahman
- Succeeded by: A.N.M Shamsul Islam

Personal details
- Born: Khulna, East Pakistan
- Party: Bangladesh Jamaat-e-Islami
- Other political affiliations: Jatiya Samajtantrik Dal (till 1985)
- Children: Arman; Salman
- Occupation: Businessman, politician

Mia Ghulam Parwar (Note: Bengali: মিয়া গোলাম পরওয়ার, romanized: Mia Golam Pôroar) (born 1959) is a politician of Bangladesh Jamaat-e-Islami and a former MP from Khulna-5. He is the 7th Secretary-General of Bangladesh Jamaat-e-Islami.

== Career ==
Parwar was elected to parliament from the Khulna-5 constituency as a candidate of Bangladesh Jamaat-e-Islami in 2001. He received 105,740 votes, while his nearest rival, Narayan Chandra Chanda of the Awami League, received 101,192 votes. In May 2004, he denied that Jamaat had any links with Jagrata Muslim Janata Bangladesh and Bangla Bhai. This was denied after Bangla Bhai ordered his followers to spread in Khulna and Bagerhat, which are viewed as areas with strong support for Jamaat.

Parwar contested the 2008 general election from Khulna-5 as a candidate of Bangladesh Jamaat-e-Islami but lost to Narayan Chandra Chanda of Awami League. He received 105,312 votes, while the winning candidate received 144,600 votes. Detective Branch (DB) arrested Parwar in November 2012. He was arrested over a clash between Jamaat sympathizers and Bangladesh Police in Motijheel.

Parwar boycotted the 2014 election along with other major parties, resulting in other candidates winning the election uncontested. In September 2015, he was detained again, along with other leaders of Jamaat from Pallabi, with crude explosives. He was arrested in October 2017 in Uttara, Dhaka, along with other leaders of Jamaat, including Maqbul Ahmad and Shafiqur Rahman, by the Detective Branch.

Parwar contested the 2018 election from Khulna-5 as a candidate of the Jatiya Oikya Front. He later announced a boycott of the election along with other Jamaat leaders, who were contesting the election using the paddy leaf symbol of the Bangladesh Nationalist Party (BNP). They had alleged the election was rigged and unfair. He received 32,959 votes, while the winning candidate, Narayan Chandra Chanda of the Awami League, received 231,717 votes.

In September 2021, Parwar was detained by Bangladesh Police in an anti-terrorism case from the Bashundhara Residential Area. He was arrested in April 2023 in an arson case dating from November 2018. He was indicted in an arson case from 2012 in August 2023.

Parwar was elected as the secretary general of the Bangladesh Jamaat-e-Islami in the party's 2020–2022 electoral session. He attended a rally of Hindu supporters of Jamaat in Khulna in November 2024.
