= Rajshahi-2 =

Constituency of Bangladesh's Jatiya Sangsad

Coordinates: 24.37°N 88.60°E

- Constituency for the Jatiya Sangsad
- District: Rajshahi District
- Division: Rajshahi Division
- Electorate: 369,564 (2026)

Current constituency
- Created: 1973
- Party: Bangladesh Nationalist Party
- Member: Mizanur Rahman Minu
- ← 52 Rajshahi-1 54 Rajshahi-3 →

Rajshahi-2 is a constituency represented in the Jatiya Sangsad (National Parliament) of Bangladesh since 2026 by Mizanur Rahman Minu of the Bangladesh Nationalist Party.

== Boundaries ==
The constituency encompasses Rajshahi City Corporation.

== History ==
The constituency was created for the first general elections in newly independent Bangladesh, held in 1973.

Ahead of the 2008 general election, the Election Commission redrew constituency boundaries to reflect population changes revealed by the 2001 Bangladesh census. The 2008 redistricting reduced the boundaries of the constituency. Previously it had also included Paba Upazila.

== Members of Parliament ==
Election	Member	Party
1973	Khalid Ali Mia	Awami League
1979	Syed Manzur Hossain	Bangladesh Nationalist Party
Major Boundary Changes
1986	Mesbah Uddin Ahmed	Jatiya Party
1988	Mesbah Uddin Ahmed	Jatiya Party
1991	Kabir Hossain	Bangladesh Nationalist Party
Feb 1996	Kabir Hossain	Bangladesh Nationalist Party
Jun 1996	Kabir Hossain	Bangladesh Nationalist Party
2001	Mizanur Rahman Minu	Bangladesh Nationalist Party
Major Boundary Changes
2008	Fazle Hossain Badsha	Workers Party of Bangladesh
2014	Fazle Hossain Badsha	Workers Party of Bangladesh
2018	Fazle Hossain Badsha	Workers Party of Bangladesh
2024	Shafiqur Rahman Badsha	Independent
2026	Mizanur Rahman Minu	Bangladesh Nationalist Party

== Elections ==
=== Elections in the 2020s ===
General election 2026: Rajshahi-2
Party	Candidate	Votes	%	±%
BNP	Mizanur Rahman Minu			
Jamaat	Mohammad Jahangir			
AB Party	Md. Saeed Noman			
Labour	Md. Mejbaul Islam			
Independent	Saleh Ahmed			
Nagorik Oikko	Mohammad Shamsul Alam			
Majority				
Turnout				
BNP gain from Independent				

=== Elections in the 2010s ===
General Election 2018: Rajshahi-2
Party	Symbol	Candidate	Votes	%	±pp
WPB	Boat	Fazle Hossain Badsha	115,453	52.11	N/A
BNP	Sheaf of paddy	Mizanur Rahman Minu	103,327	46.64	N/A
IAB	Hand fan	Md. Foysal Hossain Moni	2,129	0.96	N/A
CPB	Sickle	Md. Enamul Haque	453	0.20	N/A
NPP(S)	Mango	Saiful Islam Swapan	207	0.09	N/A
Valid votes			221,569	98.93	
Invalid votes			2,405	1.07	
Total votes			223,974	100.0	
Registered voters/turnout			317,852	70.46	N/A
Majority			12,126	5.47	N/A
WPB hold					

Fazle Hossain Badsha was re-elected unopposed in the 2014 general election after opposition parties withdrew their candidacies in a boycott of the election.

=== Elections in the 2000s ===
General Election 2008: Rajshahi-2
Party	Candidate	Votes	%	±%
WPB	Fazle Hossain Badsha	116,599	56.4	+52.5
BNP	Mizanur Rahman Minu	89,050	43.1	−16.5
CPB	Md. Enamul Haque	476	0.2	N/A
IAB	Sayeed Mahmud Ilyas	408	0.2	N/A
BDB	Akhtaruzzaman Bablu	225	0.1	N/A
Majority		27,549	13.3	−13.7
Turnout		206,758	79.9	−1.6
WPB gain from BNP				

General Election 2001: Rajshahi-2
Party	Candidate	Votes	%	±%
BNP	Mizanur Rahman Minu	176,405	59.6	+15.6
AL	A. H. M. Khairuzzaman Liton	96,604	32.6	+1.9
WPB	Fazle Hossain Badsha	11,490	3.9	+2.3
IJOF	Mostaq Ahmed	10,676	3.6	N/A
Independent	Md. Jalal Uddin	661	0.2	N/A
Jatiya Party (M)	Md. Shahabuddin Bachchu	270	0.1	N/A
Majority		79,801	27.0	+13.8
Turnout		296,106	81.5	−2.6
BNP hold				

=== Elections in the 1990s ===
General Election June 1996: Rajshahi-2
Party	Candidate	Votes	%	±%
BNP	Kabir Hossain	108,471	44.0	+0.6
AL	A. H. M. Khairuzzaman Liton	75,803	30.7	+17.8
Jamaat	Ataur Rahman	41,774	16.9	−4.6
JP(E)	Md. A. Matin Khan	13,747	5.6	+4.0
WPB	Fazle Hossain Badsha	3,838	1.6	N/A
IOJ	Md. Abdus Samad	1,169	0.5	N/A
Jatiya Samajtantrik Dal-JSD	Md. Khairul Alam	827	0.3	N/A
Zaker Party	Md. Anisur Rahman	345	0.1	−0.2
BKA	Wali Uallah Dewan	296	0.1	N/A
Jatiya Janata Party (Asad)	Begum Rokeya Firoj	291	0.1	N/A
FP	Md. Abu Masud	45	0.0	−0.2
Majority		32,668	13.2	−8.7
Turnout		246,606	84.1	+9.8
BNP hold				

General Election 1991: Rajshahi-2
Party	Candidate	Votes	%	±%
BNP	Kabir Hossain	81,014	43.4	
Jamaat	Ataur Rahman	40,141	21.5	
UCL	Fazle Hossain Badsha	34,267	18.4	
AL	A E M Mahbub Uz Zaman Bhulu	24,047	12.9	
JP(E)	Badiuzzaman	2,967	1.6	
Independent	Md. Khondakar Zoinal Abedin	1,628	0.9	
Peoples Democratic Party	Md. Mojibar Rahman	879	0.5	
Zaker Party	Md. Sharif Uddin	607	0.3	
Independent	Md. Zalal Uddin	330	0.2	
FP	Abul Hasnat Md. Shamsul Haq Shamrat	322	0.2	
Independent	Mohammad Ali	202	0.1	
Bangladesh Muslim League (Kader)	Md. Aminul Islam	200	0.1	
Jatiya Oikkya Front	Md. Abdul Bari	85	0.0	
Majority		40,873	21.9	
Turnout		186,689	74.3	
BNP gain from JP(E)				
