= Tanore Upazila =

Tanore Upazila তানোর উপজেলা
- Upazila of Bangladesh
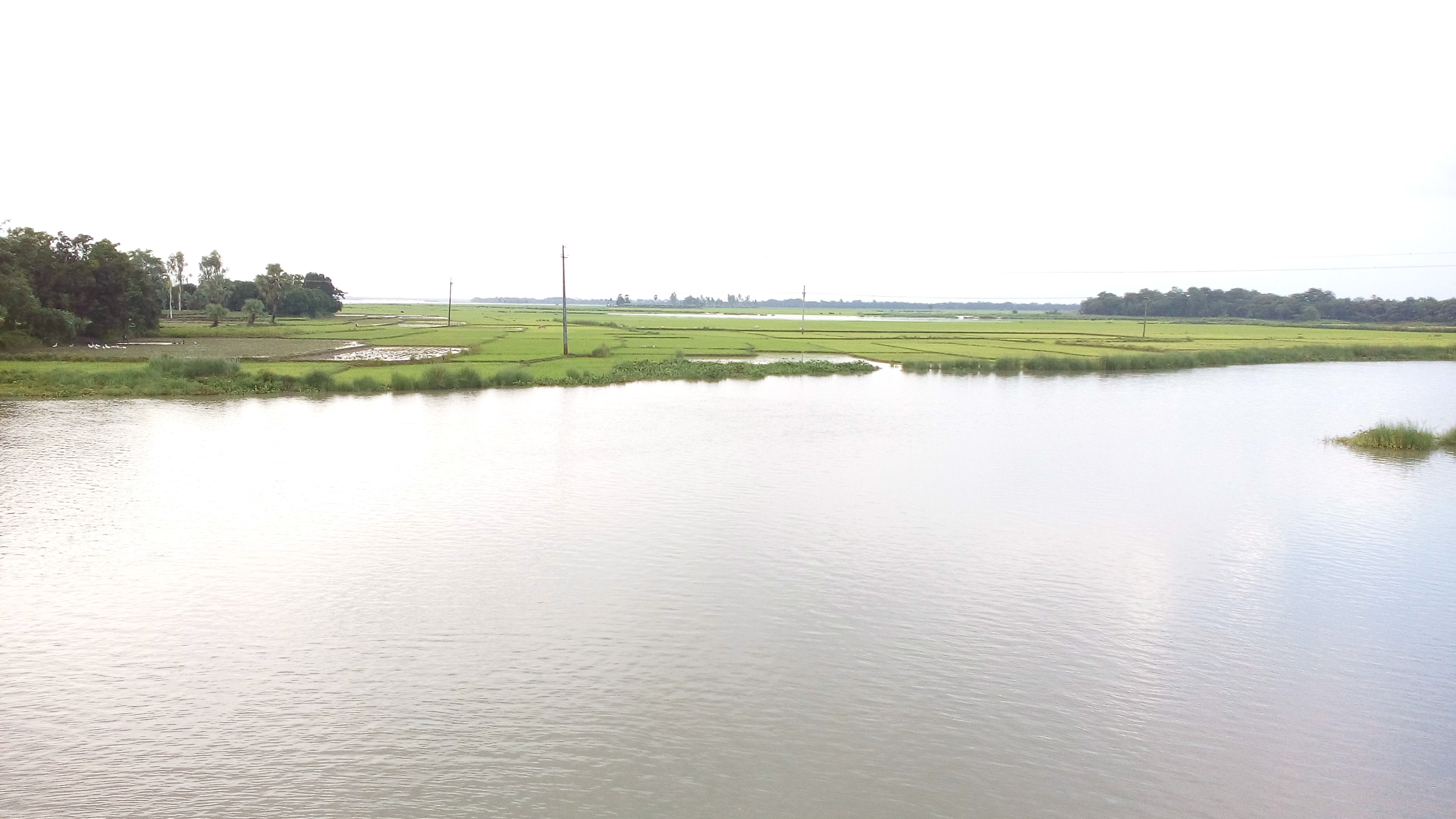
- Bilkumari Bil beside the river Shiba

- Coordinates: 24.6028°N 88.5806°E
- Country: Bangladesh
- Division: Rajshahi
- District: Rajshahi

Area
  - Total: 295.40 km^{2} (114.05 sq mi)

Population (2022)
  - Total: 212,983
  - Density: 721.00/km^{2} (1,867.4/sq mi)
- Time zone: UTC+6 (BST)
- Postal code: 6230
- Area code: 07229
- Website: Official Map of Tanore

Tanore Upazila mauza geocode map

Tanore Upazila (Bengali: তানোর উপজেলা) is an upazila of Rajshahi District in the division of Rajshahi, Bangladesh. Tanore police station was established in February 1869, and it was declared a sub-district, or upazila, in 1983.

== Geography ==
Tanore is 30 kilometers from Rajshahi city. It is surrounded by Niamatpur Upazila and Manda Upazila of Naogaon District to the north, Mohanpur Upazila to the east, Paba Upazila and Godagari Upazila to the south, and Chapai Nawabganj Sadar Upazila and Nachol Upazila of Chapai Nawabganj District to the west. There is a river at Tanore Upazila called Shiba River. The main river is the Shiba.

== History ==
A bridge over the Shiba River at the village of Buruz

The literal meaning of "tanore" in the Bengali language is "dismal area." In ancient times this area was a desert-like place with few trees or people. As time went by, the area became more habitable, and people began to settle there. Indigenous tribal groups, including the Santhal and Mahalim lived there for many years.

=== Independence war ===
Tanore Upazila was freed from Pakistan on 30 November 1971. A last battle was fought on the night of 29 November. Safikur Rahman Raja was a final year student at Rajshahi University at that time and led the freedom fighters.

Six fighters were captured by the Pakistani army with the help of local collaborators (Rajakars) near the river port of Buruj on 29 November. They were tortured in the Tanore police station. A guerrilla team consisting of 30 to 35 freedom fighters divided into four groups attacked the police station that night to free them. They were led by Safikur Rahman Raja. Although the freedom fighters had less ammunition, they forced the enemy to retreat and freed the captives. Three fighters were killed, while Sirajul Islam, alias Hanif Mridha, survived his wounds. The martyrs were Monayem Monjur, a student of Rajshahi Polytechnic institute; Muhammad Islam, a student of class ten of Maskatadighi school at Katakhali; and an indigenous youth whose name was not known. The Pakistani army withdrew their soldiers and police forces from this area on 30 November. Safikur Rahman Raja hoisted the flag of independent Bangladesh at Tanore on 17 December. A place of execution is located at Gollapara Bazaar in Tanore that bears the testimony of oppressions, tortures, and atrocities done by the autocratic Pakistani army.

== Demographics ==
Religions in Tanore Upazila (2022)
Religion	Percent
Islam	85.06%
Hinduism	7.93%
Christianity	5.69%
Other or not stated	1.32%

According to the 2022 Bangladeshi census, Tanore Upazila had 58,670 households and a population of 212,983. 8.68% of the population were under 5 years of age. Tanore had a literacy rate (age 7 and over) of 72.31%: 74.72% for males and 70.00% for females, and a sex ratio of 97.35 males for every 100 females. 61,729 (28.98%) lived in urban areas.

According to the 2011 Census of Bangladesh, Tanore Upazila had 47,425 households and a population of 191,330. 38,492 (20.12%) were under 10 years of age. Tanore had a literacy rate (age 7 and over) of 72.31%, compared to the national average of 51.8%, and a sex ratio of 1035 females per 1000 males. 53,419 (27.92%) lived in urban areas. The ethnic population was 13,531 (7.07%), of which 9,166 were Santal. According to the 2022 census, the total population was 212,983. The ethnic population was 12,474 (5.86%) of which 9,855 were Santal people.

Population of upazila by ethnicity (2022)
1. Bengali (94.1%)
2. Santal (4.63%)
3. Others (1.23%)

== Culture ==
The area has 510 mosques, 200 Eid-gahs, 22 temples, 16 churches, and 1 pagoda.

== Economy ==
Agriculture covers approximately 22,665 hectares, including 21,295 cultivable hectares. The main crops are paddy, potato, wheat, maize, tomato, brinjal, onion, and garlic. Rice is the staple food. Mango and jackfruit are cultivated.

== Administration ==
Tanore Upazila is divided into Mundumala Municipality, Tanore Municipality, and seven union parishads: Badhair, Chanduria, Kalma, Kamargaon, Pachandar, Saranjai, and Talanda. The union parishads are subdivided into 211 mauzas and 169 villages.

== Education ==
The literacy rate of Tanore Upazila is 72.31%. The area offers 127 primary schools (49 government and 78 non-government), 62 high/junior-high schools, 18 colleges (including 2 technical and vocational colleges), and 28 madrasas.

== Transport ==
The Tanore sub-district can be reached by road. No railway connection is present. Tanore Upazila Parisad is approximately 30 kilometers away from the Rajshahi bus stand. In the rainy season, the Shiba River is used to transport goods to this upazila. The area has 216 km of metalled road, 51 km of semi-metalled road, and 427 km of unmetalled road.

== Notable people ==
- Omor Faruk Chowdhury, member of parliament, represented Rajshahi-1 from 2008 to 2024.
- Mahiya Mahi, film actress, was born in Tanore in 1993.

== See also ==
- Upazilas of Bangladesh
- Districts of Bangladesh
- Divisions of Bangladesh
