= Bangladesh Sramik Kallyan Federation =

Jamaat-e-Islami-backed trade union of Bangladesh

- বাংলাদেশ শ্রমিক কল্যাণ ফেডারেশন
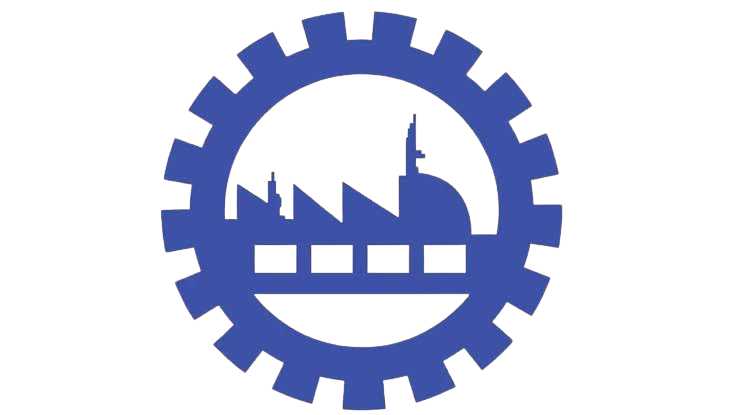
- Logo of Sramik Kalyan Federation
- Formation: May 23, 1968; 58 years ago
- Headquarters: 435, Old Elephant Road, Dhaka-1217
- Region served: Bangladesh
- Official language: Bengali
- President: Advocate Atikur Rahman
- Secretary General: Lashkar Mohammad Taslim
- Chief Advisor: Shafiqur Rahman
- Parent organization: Bangladesh Jamaat-e-Islami (de facto)

Bangladesh Sramik Kallyan Federation (Bengali: বাংলাদেশ শ্রমিক কল্যাণ ফেডারেশন, lit. 'Bangladesh Labour Welfare Federation') is a national trade union affiliated with Bangladesh Jamaat-e-Islami. The federation is currently headed by advocate Atikur Rahman as president and Lashkar Mohammad Taslim as secretary general.

== History ==
Qurban Ali was the first president of the Federation, established on 23 May 1968. The organization is affiliated with the Bangladesh Rickshaw Sramik Kallyan Federation.

Bangladesh Jamaat-e-Islami revived the organization in the 70s following the removal of the ban on the party by President Ziaur Rahman after the assassination of Sheikh Mujibur Rahman and ousting of Mujib's regime.

In May 2004, the federation's workers engaged in violent clashes with supporters of the Motor Sramik Union office which is affiliated with the Bangladesh Nationalist Party (BNP), in Jaldhaka, Nilphamari.

The federation reportedly evicted employees of Bangladesh Railway's West Zone for not supporting the Bangladesh Jamaat-e-Islami-backed organization in November 2007. Additionally, a leader of the federation was detained by locals in Satkhira for alleged "unsocial activity". In April 2008, locals in Fatullah accused the federation of instigating violent protests by workers in readymade garment factories.

In June 2010, the Khulna City unit of the federation criticized the Awami League government for the closure of factories in the Khulna-Jessore industrial belt. In December 2010, 11 Jamaat-e-Islami and federation men were detained while trying to organize a protest. In October 2010, police filed charges against activists of the federation and Bangladesh Jamaat-e-Islami, including former member of parliament Mujibur Rahman, for possessing bomb-making materials and anti-state pamphlets.

The 2010s saw a number of Federation leaders detained along with Bangladesh Jamaat-e-Islami leaders. In April 2014, police detained a leader of the federation and counsellor of 8th ward of Bogra Arshadul Bari Arshad who had 21 cases against him. In September 2015, police detained 11 Jamaat-e-Islami including Mia Golam Parwar and Prof Mujibur Rahman from a flat owned by the president of the federation Harunur Rashid. President of the Nachole upazila unit of the Federation was detained in November 2015. In April 2018, Police detained SM Sanaullah, Gazipur city Jamaat-e-Islami ameer, from a meeting of the Federation.

The federation criticized the closure of jute mills in Khulna and called on the government to provide financial support to 15,000 affected workers in 2020. Professor Mia Golam Parwar served as the federation's president from 2016 to 2020.

The Federation president Yeasin Ali Sarkar was detained along with other leaders of Bangladesh Jamaat-e-Islami in October 2023.

Following the fall of the Sheikh Hasina-led Awami League regime, federation vice-president Mohammad Golam Rabbani expressed support for the Muhammad Yunus-led interim government. He also condemned the attack on the Bangladeshi Deputy High Commission in Tripura, India.
