= Mayor of Rajshahi =

Official post of RCC

- Incumbent; Md. Mahfuzur Rahman Riton since 14 March 2026
- Rajshahi City Corporation
- Style: Honourable (formal)
- Type: Council Leader
- Status: Head of City Corporation Government
- Member of: Rajshahi City Corporation
- Seat: Nagar Bhaban, Rajshahi
- Appointer: Electorate of Rajshahi
- Term length: Five years, renewable
- Constituting instrument: The City Corporation act, 2009
- Inaugural holder: Advocate M. Abdul Hadi
- Formation: 11 September 1988; 38 years ago
- Salary: ৳150000 (US$1,200) per month (incl. allowances)
- Website: erajshahi.portal.gov.bd

The Mayor of Rajshahi is the chief elected executive of the Rajshahi City Corporation. The Mayor’s office oversees civic services, manages public properties, and coordinates the functions of various government agencies within the city. In addition, the Mayor is responsible for enforcing city corporation regulations and state laws, thereby ensuring good governance and the sustainable development of Rajshahi.

The Mayor's office is located in Nagar Bhaban; it has jurisdiction over all 30 wards of Rajshahi City.

== List of officeholders ==
Former Rajshahi City Corporation mayor and administrator's list:

Political parties

- Bangladesh Nationalist Party
- Bangladesh Awami League
- Jatiya Party

Other factions

- Independent

Status

- Acting Mayor, Administrator and Divisional Commissioner

No.	Portrait	Name (Birth–Death)	Designation	Election	Term of office			Political party	Reference
No.	Portrait	Name (Birth–Death)	Designation	Election	Took office	Left office	Time in office	Political party	Reference
1		Advocate; M. Abdul Hadi (?–?)	Administrator	—	13 August 1987	11 September 1988	2 years, 245 days	Bangladesh Awami League	
1		Advocate; M. Abdul Hadi (?–?)	Mayor	—	11 September 1988	15 April 1990	2 years, 245 days	Bangladesh Awami League	
2		Durul Huda (1955–2020)	Mayor	–	16 April 1990	6 November 1990	205 days	Jatiya Party	
–		Mesbah Uddin Ahmed (?–?)	Acting Mayor	–	6 November 1990	9 December 1990	33 days	Independent	
–		Mohammad Saidur Rahman (?–?)	Divisional Commissioner	–	15 December 1990	8 May 1991	144 days	Independent	
–		NA Habibullah (?–?)	Divisional Commissioner	–	8 May 1991	21 May 1991	13 days	Independent	
3		Mizanur Rahman Minu (born 1958)	Mayor	—	21 May 1991	30 December 1993	2 years, 223 days	Bangladesh Nationalist Party	
–		M Aminul Islam (?–?)	Divisional Commissioner	–	30 December 1993	11 March 1994	71 days	Independent	
4		Mizanur Rahman Minu (born 1958)	Mayor (First elected)	1994 1999; 2004	11 March 1995	11 June 2007	13 years, 92 days	Bangladesh Nationalist Party	
–		Md. Rezwan Nobi Dudu (?–?)	Acting Mayor	—	11 June 2007	14 September 2008	1 year, 95 days	Bangladesh Nationalist Party	
5		A. H. M. Khairuzzaman Liton (born 1959)	Mayor	2008	14 September 2008	5 September 2013	4 years, 356 days	Bangladesh Awami League	
6		Mosaddek Hossain Bulbul (born 1965)	Mayor	2013	18 September 2013	30 June 2018	4 years, 285 days	Bangladesh Nationalist Party	
7		A. H. M. Khairuzzaman Liton (born 1959)	Mayor	2018; 2023	30 July 2018	19 August 2024	6 years, 20 days	Bangladesh Awami League	
–		Dr. Dewan Muhammad Humayun Kabir (?–?)	Divisional Commissioner & Administrator	–	19 August 2024	2 December 2024	105 days	Independent	
–		Khandkar Azim Ahmed (?–?)	Divisional Commissioner & Administrator	–	2 December 2024	18 November 2025	351 days	Independent	
–		Dr. A. N. M. Bazlur Rashid (?–?)	Divisional Commissioner	–	18 November 2025	14 March 2026	117 days	Independent	
–		Md. Mahfuzur Rahman Riton (?–?)	Administrator	–	14 March 2026	Incumbent	227 days	Bangladesh Nationalist Party	

== Elections ==
=== Election Result 2023 ===
Rajshahi Mayoral Election 2023
Party	Candidate	Votes	%	±%
AL	A. H. M. Khairuzzaman Liton	160,290	81.87	+30.04
IAB	Murshid Alam	13,483	6.89	New
Zaker Party	Latif Anwar	11,713	5.98	New
JP(E)	Saiful Islam Swapan	10,272	5.25	New
Majority		146,807	74.98	+47.60
Turnout		195,758	55.63	▼20.65pp
Registered electors		351,982		
AL hold				

=== Election Result 2018 ===
Rajshahi Mayoral Election 2018
Party	Candidate	Votes	%	±%
AL	A. H. M. Khairuzzaman Liton	166,394	51.83	+12.89
BNP	Mosaddek Hossain Bulbul	78,492	24.45	−36.52
Majority		87,902	27.38%	+5.35
Turnout		244,886	76.28	▲1.35pp
Registered electors		321,046		
AL gain from BNP				

=== Election Result 2013 ===
Rajshahi Mayoral Election 2013
Party	Candidate	Votes	%	±%
BNP	Mosaddek Hossain Bulbul	131,058	60.97	New
AL	A. H. M. Khairuzzaman Liton	83,726	38.94	New
Majority		47,332	22.03	New
Turnout		214,784	74.93	New
Registered electors		286,917		
BNP gain from AL				
