= Mosaddek Hossain Bulbul =

Bangladeshi politician (born 1965)

- মোসাদ্দেক হোসেন বুলবুল

6th Mayor of Rajshahi
- In office 15 June 2013 – 28 July 2018
- Preceded by: A. H. M. Khairuzzaman Liton
- Succeeded by: A. H. M. Khairuzzaman Liton

Personal details
- Born: 5 June 1965 (age 61) Boalia, Rajshahi, East Pakistan now Bangladesh
- Party: Bangladesh Nationalist Party
- Education: University of Rajshahi
- Occupation: Politician

Mosaddek Hossain Bulbul (born 5 June 1965) is a Bangladesh Nationalist Party politician and a former mayor of the Rajshahi City Corporation.

== Early life and education ==
Bulbul was born on 5 June 1965 in Boalia of Rajshahi District to Abdur Rashid and Fetema Begum. He passed the SSC exam in 1981 from Sirail Government High School and HSC exam in 1984 from Rajshahi Government City College. He obtained his bachelor's in 1986 and master's in political science in 1988 from the University of Rajshahi. Later he received LLB degree in 1992 from the same university.

== Career ==
Bulbul contested the mayoral election in August 2008 and lost to A. H. M. Khairuzzaman Liton, the Awami League candidate. He alleged irregularities against the Election Commission and called for the removal of Chief Election Commissioner A. T. M. Shamsul Huda.

In June 2013, Bulbul was elected mayor of Rajshahi City Corporation by winning the popular vote 131,058 to 83,726 against the incumbent mayor A. H. M. Khairuzzaman Liton.

On 26 December 2013, Bangladesh Nationalist Party allegedly threw a bomb at a police vehicle injuring 8 policemen and killing constable Siddhartha Chandra Sarkar. They were protesting ahead of the national election on 5 January 2014. The investigation officer of the case filed charges against 89 including Bulbul and Mizanur Rahman Minu.

In September 2014, Bulbul among 89 politicians were charged in two cases filed over the killing of a police constable in Rajshahi. In May 2015, he was suspended from the mayoral duty. The government then made Md Nijam Ul Azim acting mayor of the city.

On 5 March 2017, the Bangladesh Supreme Court issued a verdict declaring Bulbul's suspension from the post of mayor illegal. It also said that Bulbul could resume his office as the mayor of Rajshahi. He resumed his office on 5 April 2017; he had tried to join office on 3 April but found it locked. He was suspended again few hours after he resumed his office. The Supreme Court issued a stay order on his suspension order.

In 2018, Bulbul stood for re-election for the mayor of Rajshahi against A. H. M. Khairuzzaman Liton. There was a shortage of ballot papers for mayoral candidates and voters were asked to vote for councilor candidates only. Bulbul alleged Bangladesh Nationalist Party polling agents were driven away from the voting centres. He reported 20 polling agents of Bangladesh Nationalist Party went missing since election day. A. H. M. Khairuzzaman Liton won the election. Liton received 165 thousand votes while Bulbul received 77 thousand votes. Bulbul had campaigned on national issues, such as the detention of former prime minister Khaleda Zia, while Liton focused on local issues related to Rajshahi City.
