= Mesbah Uddin Ahmed =

Bangladeshi politician

Member of Bangladesh Parliament
- In office 1988–1986
- Preceded by: Syed Monjur Hossain
- Succeeded by: Mesbah Uddin Ahmed
- In office 1988–1990
- Preceded by: Mesbah Uddin Ahmed
- Succeeded by: Kabir Hossain

Personal details
- Party: Jatiya Party (Ershad)

Mesbah Uddin Ahmed (Bengali: মেসবাহ উদ্দিন আহমেদ) is a Jatiya Party (Ershad) politician, former member of parliament for Rajshahi-2, and former mayor of Rajshahi City Corporation.

== Career ==
Ahmed was elected to parliament from Rajshahi-2 constituency as a Jatiya Party candidate in 1986. He was re-elected in 1988.
