= Shiba-Baranai-Gurnai River =

River in Bangladesh

Coordinates: 24.1667°N 89.4667°E

The Shiba-Baranai-Gurnai River is located in western Bangladesh. It begins as the Shiba in Tanore Upazila.
