= Omor Faruk Chowdhury =

Bangladeshi politician

- ওমর ফারুক চৌধুরী

Member of Parliament for Rajshahi-1
- In office 2008 – 6 August 2024
- Preceded by: Aminul Haque
- Succeeded by: Mujibur Rahman

State Minister of Industries
- In office 16 September 2012 – 24 January 2014
- Preceded by: Rezaul Karim
- Succeeded by: Kamal Ahmed Majumder

Personal details
- Born: 1 February 1960 (age 66)
- Party: Bangladesh Awami League
- Education: L.L.B (Hon's)
- Occupation: Agriculture, Food processing Industry and Consultancy Business

Omor Faruk Chowdhury (born 2 January 1960) is a Bangladesh Awami League politician and a former Jatiya Sangsad member representing the Rajshahi-1 constituency. He served as a state minister of industries from September 2012 until January 2014.

== Education and career ==
Chowdhury has a LLB degree.

Chowdhury was elected to the parliament from Rajshahi-1 in 2008 and on 5 January 2014 as a Bangladesh Awami League candidate. He was sent a show cause notice by the Bangladesh Election Commission in April 2016 for violating electoral code by supporting candidates in local elections. He is a former state minister of Industries.

On 15 January 2018, Chowdhury was accused by a Prothom Alo report of being involved in a drug trade. He denied the allegations in a rejoinder to the Prothom Alo. The Prothom Alo replied the report was based on a report by the Ministry of Home Affairs on the drug trade in Rajshahi.

On 27 February 2019, the Election Commission ordered Chowdhury to leave an upazila electoral zone in Rajshahi for violating rules.

== Controversy ==
He has been accused of beating and injuring a college principal named Selim Reza on 7 July. Though MP Omar Farooq Chowdhury denied the allegations against him, saying Selim Reza was injured in an internal clash. According to college sources, the principal alongside eight of his colleagues went to the MP's office to settle a matter regarding a conversation between a college professor's wife and a politician. During conversation, the MP started beating the college principal with a stick, said witnesses
