= A. H. M. Khairuzzaman Liton =

Bangladeshi politician

- এ. এইচ. এম. খায়রুজ্জামান লিটন
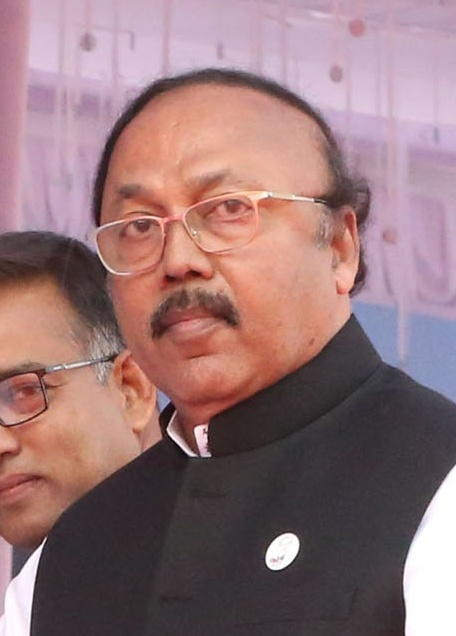
- Liton in 2023

7th Mayor of Rajshahi
- In office 30 July 2018 – 19 August 2024
- Preceded by: Mosaddek Hossain Bulbul
- Succeeded by: Dr. Dewan Muhammad Humayun Kabir; as Administrator
- In office 4 August 2008 – 15 June 2013
- Preceded by: Mizanur Rahman Minu
- Succeeded by: Mosaddek Hossain Bulbul

Personal details
- Born: 14 August 1959 (age 67) Rajshahi District, East Pakistan, Pakistan
- Party: Bangladesh Awami League
- Spouse: Shaheen Akhtar Reni
- Children: 2 daughters
- Parent: Abul Hasnat Muhammad Qamaruzzaman (father)
- Education: University of Calcutta
- Occupation: politician

Abul Hasnat Muhammad Khairuzzaman Liton (born 14 August 1959) is a Bangladesh Awami League presidium member and the former mayor of Rajshahi City Corporation.

== Early life and education ==
Liton was born at Kadirganj in Rajshahi District on 14 August 1959. His father, A.H.M. Kamaruzzaman, was one of the national leaders of Bangladesh. He was a student of Rajshahi Collegiate School from class 3 to class 7. In 1976, he passed his HS Exam from Narendrapur Ramkrishna Mission. He completed his bachelor's from the University of Calcutta in English in 1979. He completed Bachelor of Laws from University of Rajshahi in 1983.

== Political career ==
In 1985, Liton became a Bar Council Member. In 1986, he joined Bangladesh Awami League. He took part in the general elections in 1996 and 2001 from the constituency of Rajshahi-2 (Poba-Boalia). He was the president of Rajshahi City Awami League until he was nominated as AL presidium member. He got a landslide victory in the 30 July 2018 Rajshahi City Corporation election. As per results of the total 138 polling centres, Liton bagged a total of 1,65,096 votes while his nearest contestant Bulbul got 77,700 votes.

After Khairuzzaman Liton was elected mayor in 2008, in his first term ever, he gave the work of constructing 3 multi-storied buildings of Rajshahi City Corporation on the basis of Public Private Partnership (PPP) to his close associates. Later it took almost a decade to complete these works.

Mayor Liton took the initiative to install 16 floodlights to illuminate 16 important intersections of Rajshahi metropolis in his second term. The contractor company 'Harrow Engineering and Construction' implemented the work at 9 crore 7 lakh 77 thousand 777 taka. Allegations of corruption surfaced only after the work was completed. The Anti-Corruption Commission (ACC) conducted raids and seized project documents. However, the controversial contractor was given more work.

Allegations against a business entity named Amana Group for investing in foreign companies without the approval of the Central Bank of Bangladesh came to light through investigative journalism. Where it is shown that the group has raised about 800 crore rupees from common people through housing business and multilevel business strategy without buying land. Later they joined the shipping business. From which the fear is expressed in those reports that Trade Based Money Laundering (TBML) is being prepared. In various processes Khairuzzaman Liton, his wife Shaheen Akhtar Reni and daughter Dr. Anika Fariha Zaman Arna is included as a partner in their business network and their network extends to Britain, Dubai, Pakistan and India, according to reports published in various Bangladeshi media.

Following the fall of the Sheikh Hasina led Awami League government, Liton's home in Rajshahi was demolished in February 2025.
