= Aminul Haque (politician) =

Bangladeshi politician (died 2019)

- আমিনুল হক

Member of Parliament for Rajshahi-1
- In office 1991–2006
- Succeeded by: Omor Faruk Chowdhury

Posts and Telecommunications Minister
- In office 2001–2006

Personal details
- Born: 1942/1943
- Died: 21 April 2019 (aged 76) Dhaka, Bangladesh
- Party: Bangladesh Nationalist Party
- Relations: Dr. Enamul Huq (Brother)

Aminul Haque (1942/1943 – 21 April 2019) was a Bangladesh Nationalist Party politician who served as the Bangladesh minister of post and telecommunications. A member of the Bangladesh Nationalist Party (BNP), he represented Rajshahi-1 as a member of parliament from 1991 to 2006.

== Political career ==
Haque was a barrister. He was elected a member of parliament from the Rajshahi-1 constituency in the elections held in 1991, 1996 and 2001. He served as the post and telecommunications minister during 2001–2006.

== Allegations and imprisonments ==
In 2005, a BNP MP from Rajshahi-3 constituency, Abu Hena, alleged that Haque was among several party members who were affiliated with Bangla Bhai, military commander of a local Islamist organization. In November, Hena was expelled from the party for the statements over the rise of Islamic militancy in the country. Bangla Bhai, before his execution in January 2007, disclosed Haque's name as one of the patrons of Islamist militancy. In July 2007, Haque was sentenced in absentia to 31 years and six months' imprisonment for aiding and abetting the militants of Jamaat-ul-Mujahideen Bangladesh (JMB) in extorting and torturing people in Bagmara Upazila in 2004. In May 2009, Frontline World, a US-based news service, reported he had received bribes from the German company, Siemens in 2004.

In July 2009, Haque surrendered and was sent to jail.

In January 2018, Prime Minister Sheikh Hasina named Haque as one of the 50 Bangladeshis whose names were included in the Paradise Papers.

== Death ==
Haque died on 21 April 2019 at the age of 76 by lung cancer.
