= Kabir Hossain =

Bangladeshi politician (died 2023)

- কবির হোসেন

Minister of State for Land Minister of State for Local Government
- In office 1991–1995
- Preceded by: Syed Abul Hossain
- Succeeded by: Mofazzal Hossain Chowdhury

Member of Parliament for Rajshahi-2
- In office 27 February 1991 – 1 October 2001
- Preceded by: Mesbah Uddin Ahmed

Member of Parliament for Rajshahi-5
- In office 1 October 2001 – 28 October 2006
- Succeeded by: Mizanur Rhaman Minu

Personal details
- Born: c. 14 April 1938
- Died: 3 May 2023 (aged 85) Rajshahi, Bangladesh
- Party: Bangladesh Nationalist Party

Kabir Hossain (c. 14 April 1938 – 3 May 2023) was a Bangladesh Nationalist Party politician who served as a member of parliament for the Rajshahi-5 constituency.

== Career ==
Hossain was elected to parliament from Rajshahi-5 as a Bangladesh Nationalist Party candidate in 2001.

== Death ==
On 3 May 2023, Hossain, age 85, was pronounced dead at the Rajshahi Medical College Hospital in Rajshahi due to old age. According to a statement made by Mossaddique Hossain Bulbul, BNP's forest and environment affairs secretary, Hossain had been suffering from various old-age complications, including diabetes, heart disease and high blood pressure.
