= Prafulla Kumar Shil =

Bangladeshi politician

Member of Parliament for Khulna-5
- In office 2 April 1979 – 24 March 1982
- Preceded by: Kuber Chandra Biswas
- Succeeded by: H. M. A. Gaffar

Personal details
- Died: 23 November 2014
- Party: Bangladesh Awami League

Prafulla Kumar Shil was a Bangladeshi academic and politician from Khulna belonging to Bangladesh Awami League. He was a member of the Jatiya Sangsad.

== Biography ==
Shil was the principal of Digraj College in Mongla of Bagerhat. He was elected as a member of the Jatiya Sangsad from Khulna-5 in 1979.

Shil died on 23 November 2014 at Abu Naser Hospital in Khulna.
