= Mizanur Rahman Minu =

Bangladeshi politician

- মিজানুর রহমান মিনু
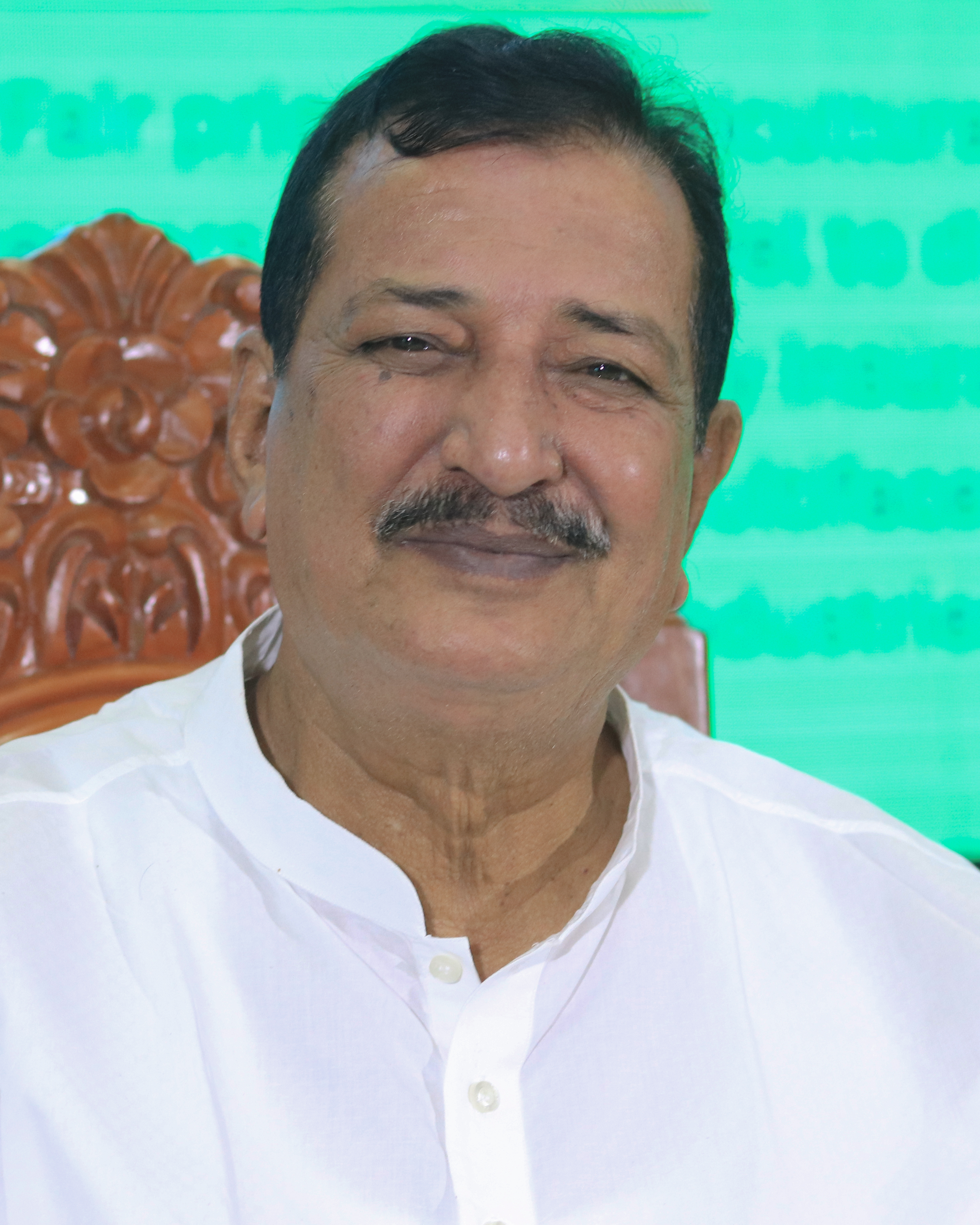
- Minu in 2024

Minister of Land
- Incumbent
- Assumed office 17 February 2026
- Prime Minister: Tarique Rahman
- Preceded by: Ali Imam Majumder

Member of Parliament
- Incumbent
- Assumed office 17 February 2026
- Preceded by: Shafiqur Rahman Badsha
- Constituency: Rajshahi-2
- In office 1 October 2001 – 29 October 2006
- Preceded by: Kabir Hossain
- Succeeded by: Fazle Hossain Badsha
- Constituency: Rajshahi-2

4th Mayor of Rajshahi
- In office 11 March 1994 – 11 June 2007
- Preceded by: M Aminul Islam (as administrator)
- Succeeded by: A. H. M. Khairuzzaman Liton
- In office 21 May 1991 – 30 December 1993
- Preceded by: NA Habibullah (as administrator)
- Succeeded by: M Aminul Islam (as administrator)

Personal details
- Born: 7 January 1958 (age 68) Rajshahi, East Pakistan, Pakistan
- Party: Bangladesh Nationalist Party
- Education: Rajshahi Collegiate School

Mizanur Rahman Minu (born 7 January 1958) is a politician of the Bangladesh Nationalist Party. He is the incumbent minister for land and is the incumbent Jatiya Sangsad member representing the Rajshahi-2 constituency since February 2026.

Minu served as the mayor of Rajshahi. He was elected president of the Rajshahi unit of the Bangladesh Nationalist Party. He is an advisor to former prime minister and chairperson of Bangladesh Nationalist Party, Khaleda Zia. He became the Minister of ministry of land on 17 February 2026.

== Career ==
Minu was elected to parliament from Rajshahi-2 as a Bangladesh Nationalist Party candidate in 2001. He received 176,405 votes while his nearest rival, A. H. M. Khairuzzaman Liton of Awami League, received 96,604 votes.

Minu was elected mayor of Rajshahi in 2002. His opponent, Fazle Hossain Badsha, made allegations of vote rigging and an Awami League activist was killed in election violence.

In November 2008, Bangladesh High Court squashed an extortion case against him in which he was sentenced to 17 years jail, thereby allowing him to compete in the upcoming parliamentary elections. He contested the election from Rajshahi-2 against Fazle Hossain Badsha of the Awami League led grand alliance.

In December 2013, Minu was sued for murder after a police constable died in a bomb attack during a strike of the Bangladesh Nationalist Party.

Minu was sent to jail in March 2014 in a case filed over the attempted murder of the officer-in-charge of Boalia model police station after he was shot at a hartal (strike) of the Bangladesh Nationalist Party on 4 June 2011.

Minu was sent to jail in six arson cases in July 2015 and was released on bail in September. He was admitted to Rajshahi Medical College Hospital after his bail.

Mosabbirul Islam, law affairs secretary of Rajshahi unit of the Awami League filed a sedition case against Minu on charges of threatening Prime Minister Sheikh Hasina at a rally of the Bangladesh Nationalist Party on 2 March 2021. He later apologized for calling for a repeat of the assassination of Sheikh Mujibur Rahman, father of Sheikh Hasina.

In July 2023, an employee of Ena Group, owned by Awami League member of parliament Enamul Haque, filed a case against Minu under the Digital Security Act after Minu accused Enamul of being a former president of Bangladesh Islami Chhatra Shibir. Judge AM Zulfiqar Hayat of the Dhaka Cyber Tribunal dismissed the case against Minu on the reasoning that the complaint did not have grounds to file a complaint as the comments were not made against him or his close family. The Prothom Alo called for the verdict to become a precedent for other cases filed under Digital Security Act to harass people.

The Bangladesh Nationalist Party sidelined Minu and Mosaddek Hossain Bulbul in favor of new leadership in Rajshahi. He was removed from the Rajshahi District convening committee of the Bangladesh Nationalist Party.
