= Fazle Hossain Badsha =

Bangladeshi politician

- ফজলে হোসেন বাদশা
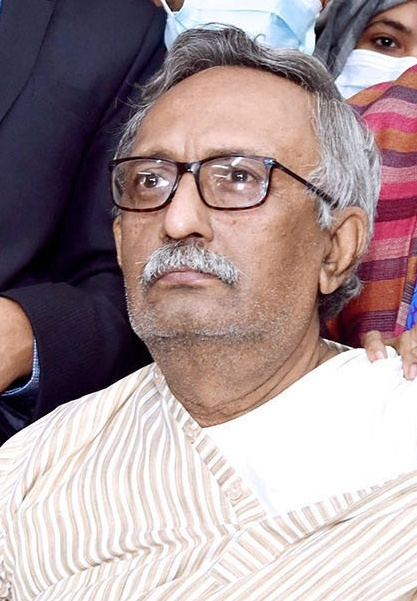
- Badsha in 2021

Member of Parliament
- In office 6 January 2009 – 10 January 2024
- Preceded by: Mizanur Rahman Minu
- Succeeded by: Shafiqur Rahman Badsha
- Constituency: Rajshahi-2

Personal details
- Born: 15 October 1952 (age 73) Rajshahi, Dominion of Pakistan
- Party: Workers Party of Bangladesh
- Education: M.A, L.L.B
- Profession: Lawyer, businessman

Khandaker Fazle Hossain Badsha (born 15 October 1952), commonly known as Fazle Hossain Badsha or simply Fazle Badsha is a Bangladeshi politician. He has served three terms as a member of the Jatiyo Sangsad since 2008, representing Rajshahi-2 for the Workers Party of Bangladesh.

== Career ==
Basha was first elected to parliament in 2008 using the boat symbol of the Awami League from Rajshahi-2. He received 116,599 votes while his closest opponent, Mizanur Rahman Minu of the Bangladesh Nationalist Party, received 89,050 votes.

Badsha was re-elected in the 2014 general election unopposed after opposition parties, including the main Bangladesh Nationalist Party, boycotted the election and withdrew their candidates.

Badsha was re-elected in 2018 general election as a candidate of the Workers Party of Bangladesh and with the electoral symbol of the Awami League. He received 115,453 while his nearest rival, Mizanur Rahman Minu of the Bangladesh Nationalist Party, received 103,327 votes.

Badsha contested the January 2024 election as a candidate of the 14-party alliance led by Awami League, which includes the Workers Party of Bangladesh, but lost to independent candidate and Awami League politician Shafiqur Rahman Badsha. He lost to the vice president of Rajshahi City Awami League and school teacher, Shafiqur Rahman, who enjoyed the support of local Awami League activists. He alleged the vote was rigged in favor of his opponents. He received 31,466 votes while his opponent received 54,906 votes. He was the chairperson the Parliamentary Standing Committee on Indigenous and Minority Affairs.

After the 2024 Bangladesh quota reform movement, Badsha campaigned for the release of detained Bangladesh Jamaat-e-Islami politician and Rajshahi City councilor, Nuruzzaman Khan, who was detained in a sabotage case in the crackdown following the movement.
