= Salahuddin Yusuf =

Bangladeshi politician

- সালাহউদ্দিন ইউসুফ

Minister of Health and Family Welfare
- In office July 1996 – 29 December 1999
- Prime Minister: Sheikh Hasina
- Preceded by: Chowdhury Kamal Ibne Yusuf
- Succeeded by: Sheikh Selim

Member of the Bangladesh Parliament for Khulna-5
- In office 5 March 1991 – 2000
- Preceded by: HMA Gaffar
- Succeeded by: Narayan Chandra Chanda

Personal details
- Died: 2000
- Party: Bangladesh Awami League

Salahuddin Yusuf (died 2000) was a Bangladesh Awami League politician and a member of parliament for Khulna-5.

== Career ==
Yusuf was elected to parliament from Khulna-5 as a Bangladesh Awami League candidate in 1991 and June 1996. He served as the minister of health and family welfare in the first Hasina ministry.
