= Divisional Commissioner (Bangladesh) =

Post

- বিভাগীয় কমিশনার
- Emblem of Bangladesh Administrative Service
- Government of Bangladesh
- Type: Administrator
- Status: Additional Secretary
- Member of: Bangladesh Administrative Service; Bangladesh Civil Service
- Reports to: Cabinet Division; Ministry of Public Administration
- Appointer: Ministry of Public Administration
- Formation: 1829; 197 years ago
- Deputy: Additional Divisional Commissioner
- Salary: ৳112080 (US$910) per month ৳1344960 (US$11,000) annually (incl. allowance)

The Divisional Commissioner is the chief bureaucratic and revenue officer of a division in Bangladesh. The commissioner supervises the revenue, development and administration of all the districts and the deputy commissioner under the jurisdiction of the given division.

The Divisional Commissioner office acts as the supervisory head of all divisional government offices situated in the division and oversee the work of deputy commissioners who oversees a respective district. A Divisional Commissioner is given the responsibility of supervising the revenue and development administration of a division. Divisional Commissioners are appointed to their post by the Ministry of Public Administration, Government of Bangladesh.

The work of the Divisional Commissioner is assisted by the additional divisional commissioner. At any time, there may be more than one Additional Divisional Commissioner working for one Divisional Commissioner.

== History ==
The post of Divisional Commissioner was created in 1829 during the time of British rule in India. Due to a lack of effective control in the departmental revenue administration of a division, and lack of proper control and coordination of the work between the divisional judiciary and the revenue system, the Board of Revenue for divisions were abolished, in favor of the post of Divisional Commissioner.

In its present form, the Office of the Divisional Commissioner exists as a post in the Ministry of Public Administration of Bangladesh.

== Duties and responsibilities ==
The primary duties of the divisional commissioner include supervising, monitoring, and controlling the activities of Deputy Commissioners. The divisional commissioner plays a key role in implementing the functions of the central government at the divisional level.

=== Transfer and posting ===
The divisional commissioner handles the transfer and posting of assistant commissioners, assistant commissioners (land), and upazila nirbahi officers (UNOs) across all districts and upazilas under the given division. He/she also transfers inter-district land officers such as sub-assistant land officers, Kanungos, and surveyors.

=== Supervision of administrative activities ===
Coordinating the activities of various departments at the divisional level is one of the fundamental responsibilities of the divisional commissioner. He/she supervises the activities of deputy commissioners, UNOs, assistant commissioners (land), and other officials and employees of his/her office, providing necessary guidelines and regularly updating the government on related progress and evaluations.

=== Revenue ===
The divisional commissioner directs and controls revenue collection in the division. As the chief revenue officer, he/she oversees all activities related to revenue collection. He/she also hears appeals against orders issued by deputy commissioners on revenue matters.

=== Law and order ===
According to the 1943 Police Regulations, the divisional commissioner exercises general control over the local police department through the district magistrate. However, he/she cannot interfere in the internal administration of the police department.

=== Monthly meetings ===
The divisional commissioner chairs monthly task force meetings, divisional law and order meetings, divisional revenue conferences, and development coordination meetings at the divisional level. Quarterly meetings with the chief executive officers of district councils are also held under his/her leadership.

=== Divisional Election Board ===
By virtue of his/her position, the divisional commissioner serves as the chairman of the Divisional Election Board. This board oversees the recruitment process for third and fourth-class employees in his/her office, the DIG's office, the police commissioner's office, deputy commissioners' offices, and the superintendent of police's offices within the division.

=== Inspection ===
The divisional commissioner regularly inspects the offices of deputy commissioners, UNOs, assistant commissioners (land), and executive magistrates within his/her division.

=== Protocol ===
The divisional commissioner is the chief protocol officer at the divisional level. He/she assumes the responsibility of chief protocol officer during visits by the President and Prime Minister.

=== Appeal Court operations ===
The divisional commissioner is the appellate authority for revenue cases, land mutation cases, and national and local government elections. He/she resolves related appeals.

=== Investigation of complaints ===
In addition to supervising BCS (Administration) cadre officers, the divisional commissioner also investigates complaints against any individual or organization.

=== Relief and disaster management ===
The commissioner oversees the allocation of relief materials in districts and upazilas under his/her division. He/she also monitors rescue operations during disasters.

=== State confidential matters ===
The commissioner ensures the security of the President and Prime Minister, manages cipher and decipher documents, and takes action based on received cipher messages. He/she ensures the safe custody of confidential documents and sends periodic confidential reports to the government.

=== Other responsibilities ===
The divisional commissioner monitors the progress of implementing priority projects of the Prime Minister and sends related reports. He/she participates in monthly coordination and review meetings organized by various ministries/departments. He/she also chairs the divisional monitoring committee, which ensures administrative support for witnesses in cases pending in the speedy trial tribunals. Additionally, the commissioner implements decisions made by the government regarding the celebration of national and international days. He/she organizes tripartite meetings to resolve audit objections at the divisional commissioner’s office and represents the divisional procurement evaluation committee under the Public Procurement Regulation 2013. He/she chairs the divisional committee on internal food grain collection and the divisional selection committee for primary education awards and national environmental awards.

== Recruitment ==
Normally, officers in the rank of Additional Secretary with previous experience in field administration are usually appointed by the government as Divisional Commissioners.

== List of incumbent divisional commissioners ==
The following is a list of incumbent divisional commissioners of Bangladesh as of December 2024:

List of Incumbent Divisional Commissioners of Bangladesh
Division	Name	Term start
Dhaka Division	Sharf Uddin Ahmed Chowdhury	24 October 2024
Chittagong Division	Dr. Md. Ziauddin	2 December 2024
Rajshahi Division	Khandker Azim Ahmed, ndc	2 December 2024
Khulna Division	Md. Firoz Sarker	8 December 2024
Barisal Division	Md. Rayhan Kawser	5 November 2024
Sylhet Division	Khan Md. Reza-Un-Nabi	2 December 2024
Rangpur Division	Md. Shahidul Islam, ndc	27 October 2024
Mymensingh Division	Md. Mokhter Ahmed	12 November 2024
