= List of zoos in Bangladesh =

Zoo of Bangladesh

This is a list of zoos in Bangladesh.

Zoos are primarily dry facilities where animals are confined within enclosures and displayed to the public, and in which they may also be bred. Such facilities include zoos, safari parks, animal theme parks, aviaries, butterfly zoos, and reptile centres, as well as wildlife sanctuaries and nature reserves where visitors are allowed.

Bangladesh has only two government-owned zoos, Rangpur Zoo and the Bangladesh National Zoo. However many areas of the country, notably many islands in the Bay of Bengal, are governed as natural zoological gardens.

== Zoos in Bangladesh ==
- Bangabandhu Sheikh Mujib Safari Park
- Bangladesh National Zoo
- Bonobilash Zoo
- Chittagong Zoo
- Comilla Zoo and Botanical Garden
- Gazipur Borendra Park
- Khulna Zoo
- Nijhum Dhip Park
- Rajshahi Zoo
- Rangpur Zoo
- Shaheed A.H.M Qamaruzzaman Central Park and Zoo

== See also ==
- List of zoos
- SAZARC
