= List of botanical gardens in Bangladesh =

In Bangladesh, the Forest Department manages two botanical gardens and several eco-parks, one of which includes a botanical garden. Some public universities have their own botanical gardens.

Name	Location	Year established	Size (acres)	Species	Ref.
National Botanical Garden of Bangladesh	Dhaka	1961	84.21	15,000	
Baldha Garden	Dhaka	1909	1.37	672	
Botanical Garden, Department of Botany, University of Dhaka	Dhaka				
Botanical Garden and Eco-Park, Sitakunda	Chittagong District	1998	808		
Bangladesh Agricultural University Botanical Garden	Mymensingh	1963	24.21	1,346	
Comilla Zoo and Botanical Garden	Comilla	1986	75		
Chittagong University Botanical Garden	Chittagong				
Lalmai Botanical Garden	Cumilla	2020	17		
