= Chittagong Zoo =

Zoo in Chittagong

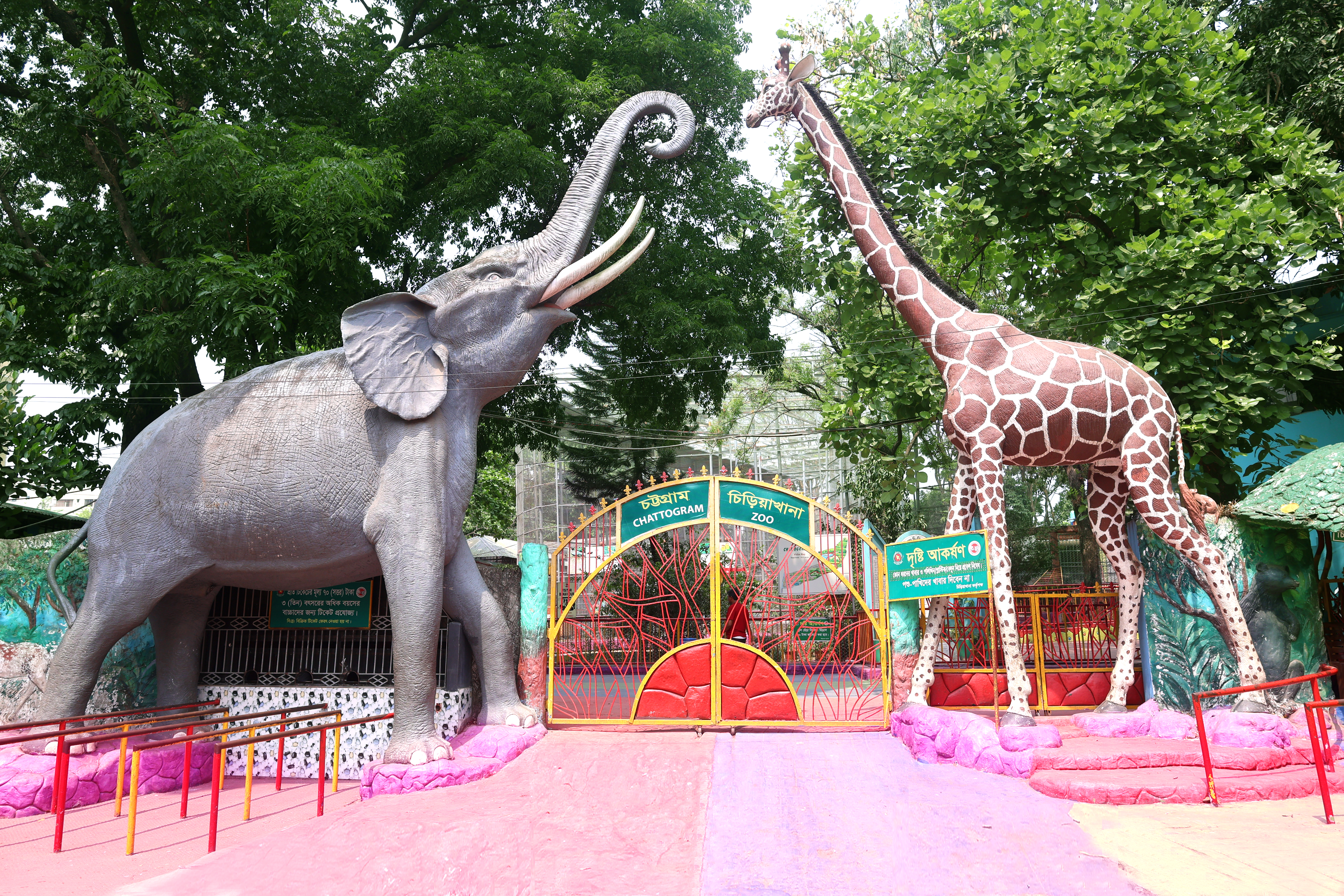
- Chittagong Zoo Entry Gate
- Interactive map of Chittagong Zoo
- 22°22′0″N 91°47′46″E
- Date opened: 28 February 1989
- Location: Foy's Lake, Khulshi, Chittagong
- Land area: 10.2 acres
- No. of animals: 520
- No. of species: 66
- Annual visitors: 1,000,000
- Major exhibits: Bengal tiger, Asiatic lion, Asian black bear, Spotted deer, White tiger
- Website: chittagongzoo.gov.bd https://www.youtube.com/watch?v=s7VOYn8obSk&t=4s

Chittagong Zoo is a zoo in Chittagong, Bangladesh. With an area of 10.2 acres of land it is located about three kilometers north-west of the city, alongside at the entrance of Foy's Lake, opposite the foothills of the mountains of USTC Medical College. The main attraction of this zoo is the first-ever white tiger born in Bangladesh in 2018. After that, there are five white tigers currently, four of which were born in 2022. Now the total number of tigers is 18.

== History ==
In 1988, MA Mannan, former deputy commissioner of Chittagong District and some other elites of the city, initially took initiative to establish a private zoo at Foy's Lake for the purpose of recreation. It is situated on the hilly land of Foy's lake, Khulshi, Chittagong. Later, on 28 February 1989, the zoo was opened for the visitors. Initially, 4.90 acres of land were allocated by the Bangladesh Government, which afterwards increased to 10.2 acres.

== Attractions ==
Initially there were 5 different species and total number of animals were 22. After that the total number of species and animals has increased.

In 2018, the total number of animals was 300 and the number of species was 54. Among them, 25 were mammals, 25 were birds and 4 were reptiles.

=== Mammals ===
Available mammals in this zoo:

- Bengal tiger
- Indian lion
- Asian black bear
- Spotted deer
- Sambar deer
- Barking Deer
- Rhesus macaque
- Hoolock gibbon
- Capped langur
- Fishing cat
- Large Indian civet
- Bengal fox
- Jungle cat
- Leopard cat
- Slow loris
- Northern pig-tailed macaque
- Rottweiler
- German Shepherd
- German Spitz
- Indian gray mongoose
- Indian crested porcupine
- Zebra
- Gayal
- Asian palm civet
- Horse

=== Reptiles ===
There are 4 species of reptiles available here.

- Indian rock python
- Marsh crocodile
- Elongated tortoise
- Black softshell turtle

=== Birds ===
Available birds in the zoo.

- Great hornbill
- Pigeon
- Turkey
- Guineafowl
- Peacock
- Common ostrich
- Oriental pied hornbill
- Griffon vulture
- Lesser adjutant
- Black kite
- Pallas's fish eagle
- Brahminy kite
- Little egret
- Cattle egret
- Black-crowned Night Heron
- Pond heron
- Little cormorant
- Alexandrine parakeet
- Rose-ringed parakeet
- Red-breasted parakeet
- Oriental turtle-dove
- Common Myna
- Asian koel
- Red Junglefowl

== Gallery ==
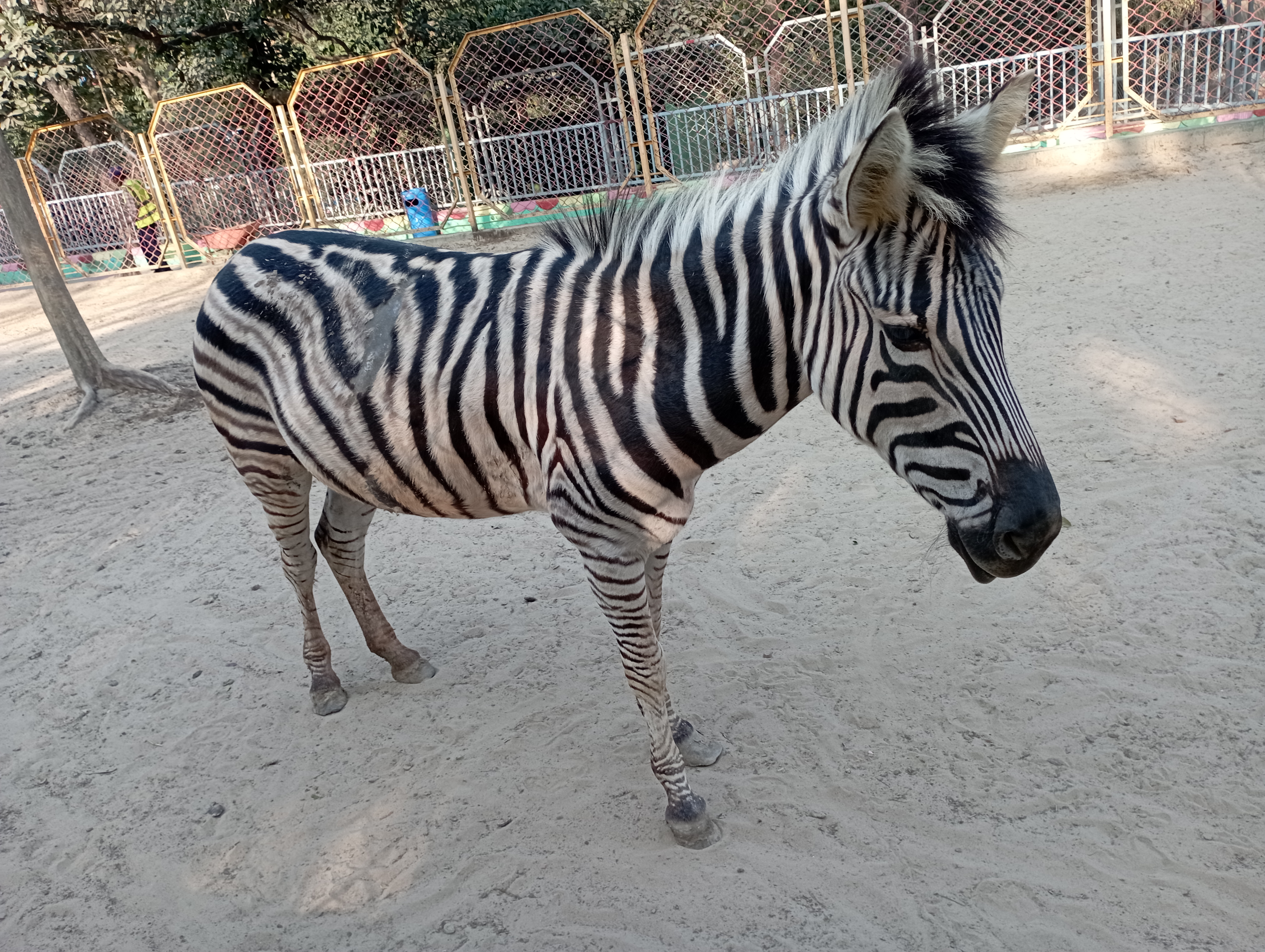
Zebra

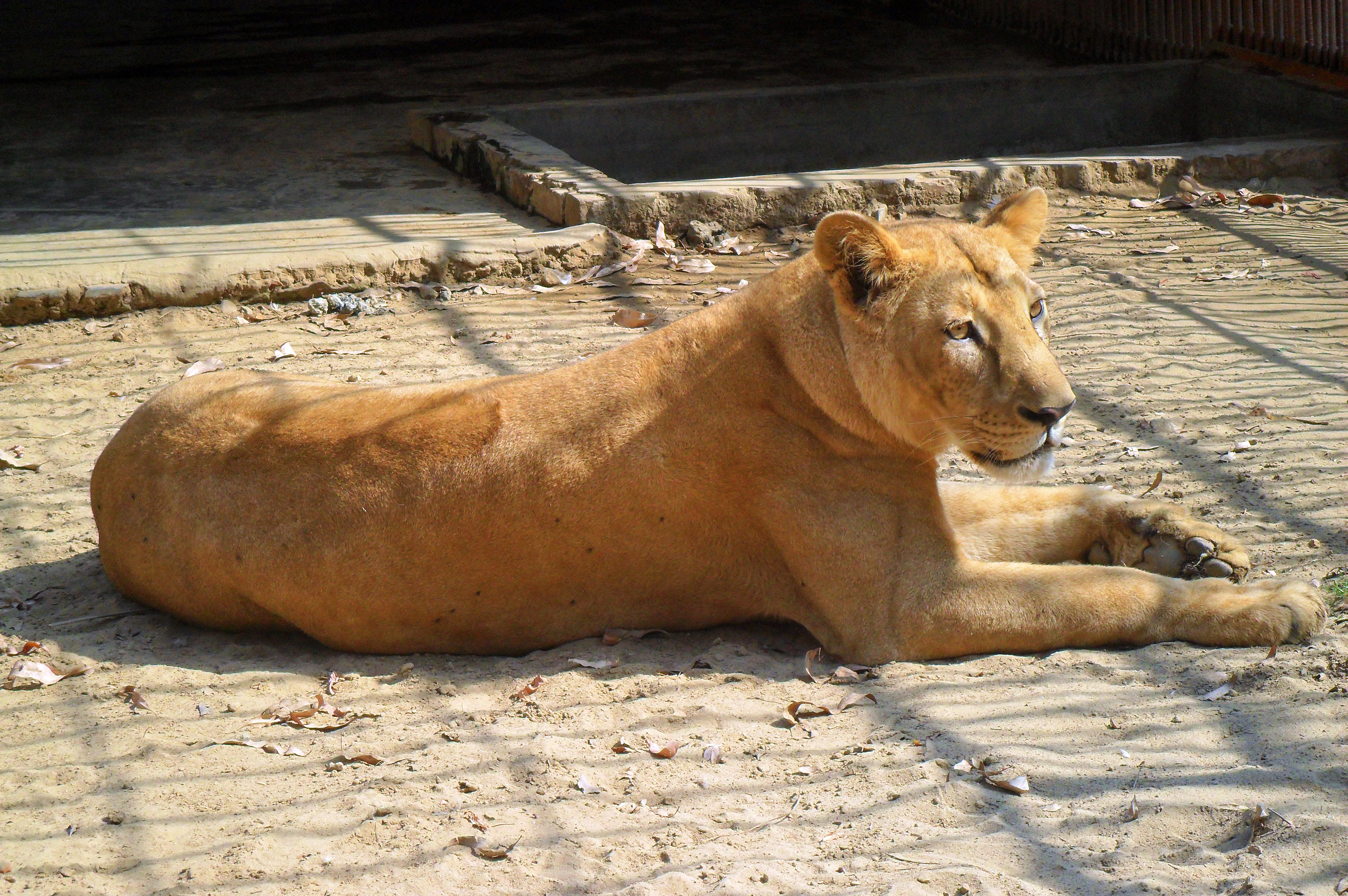
African Lion

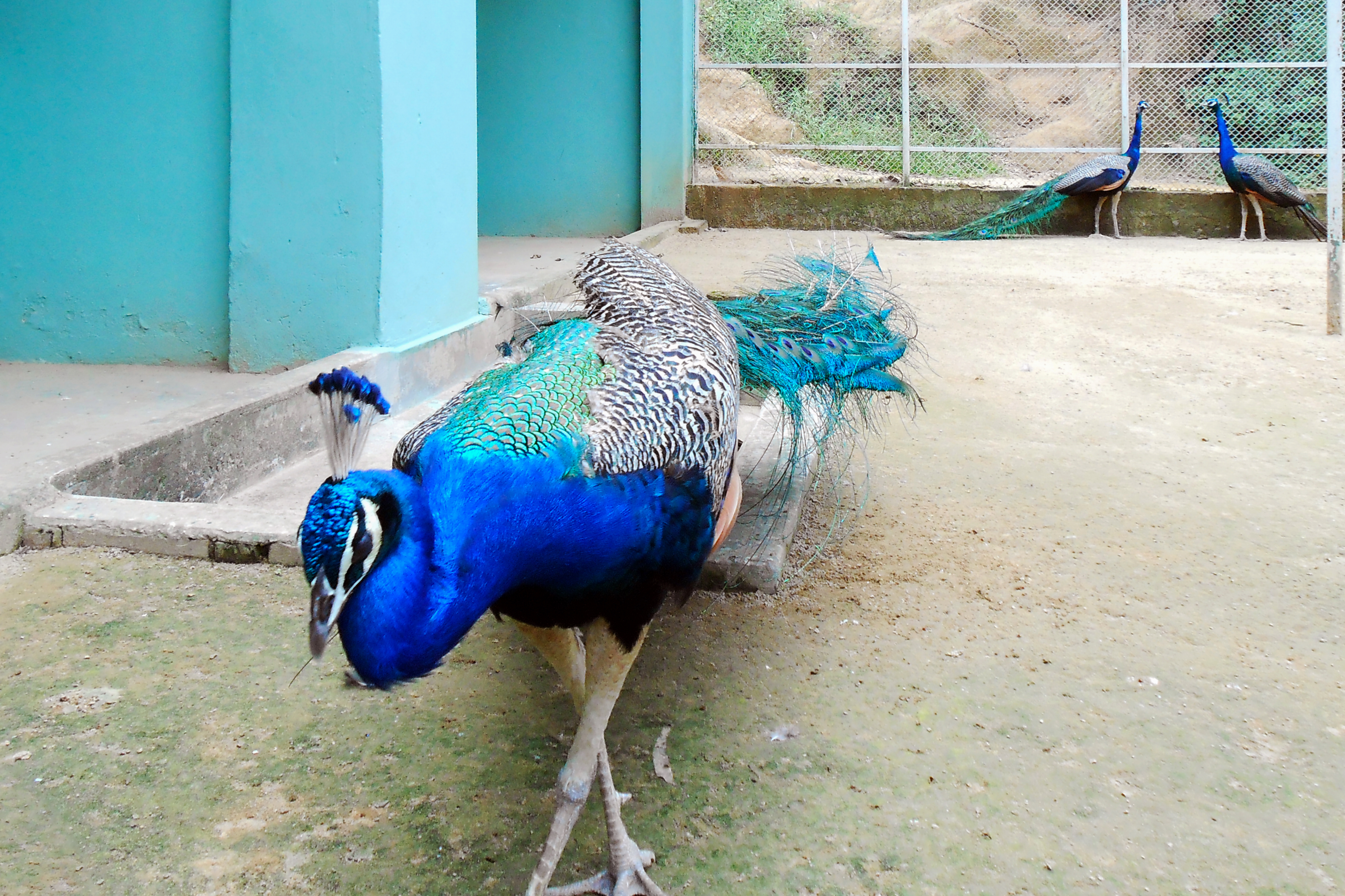
Indian peafowl

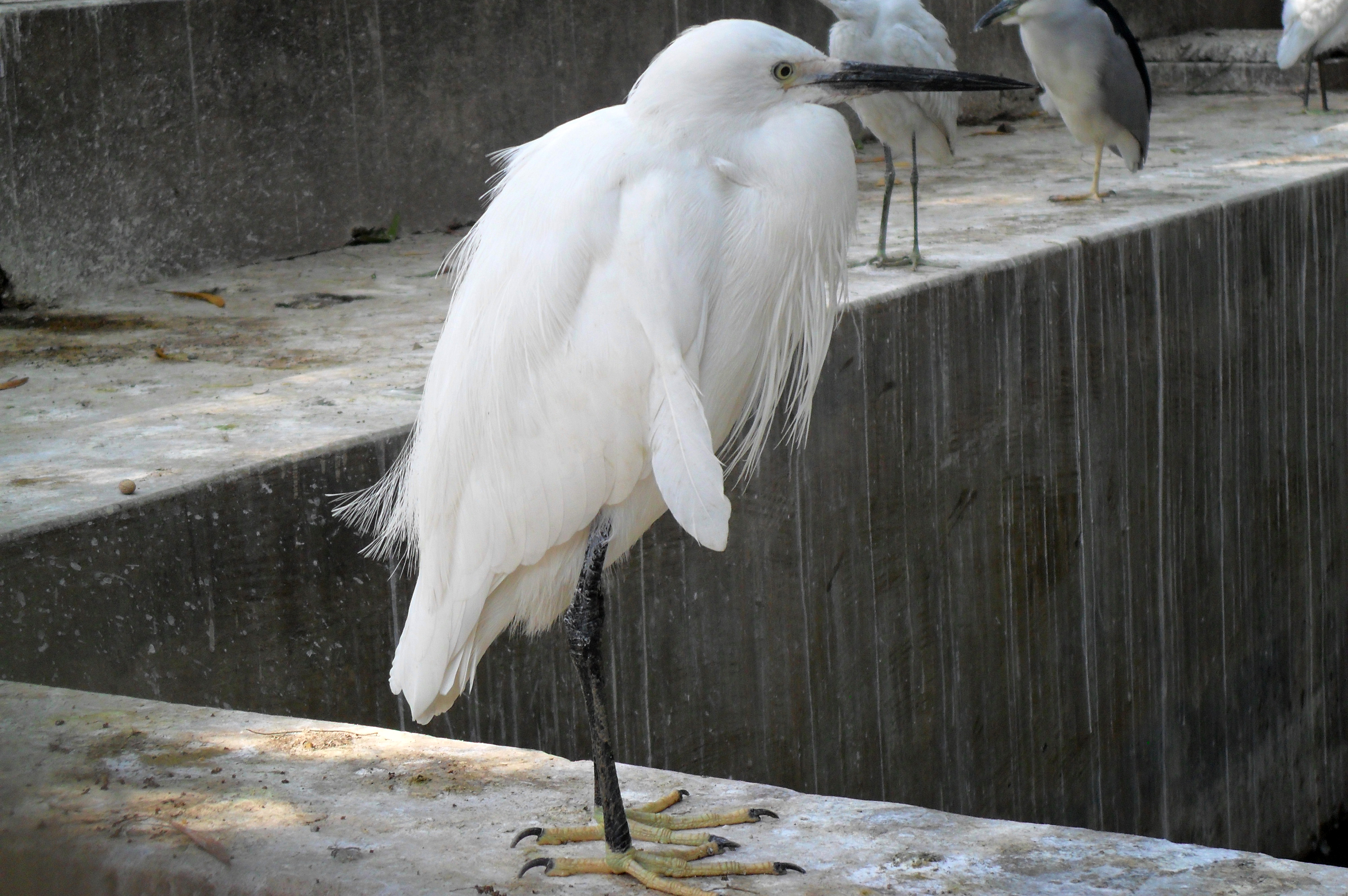
Pacific reef heron

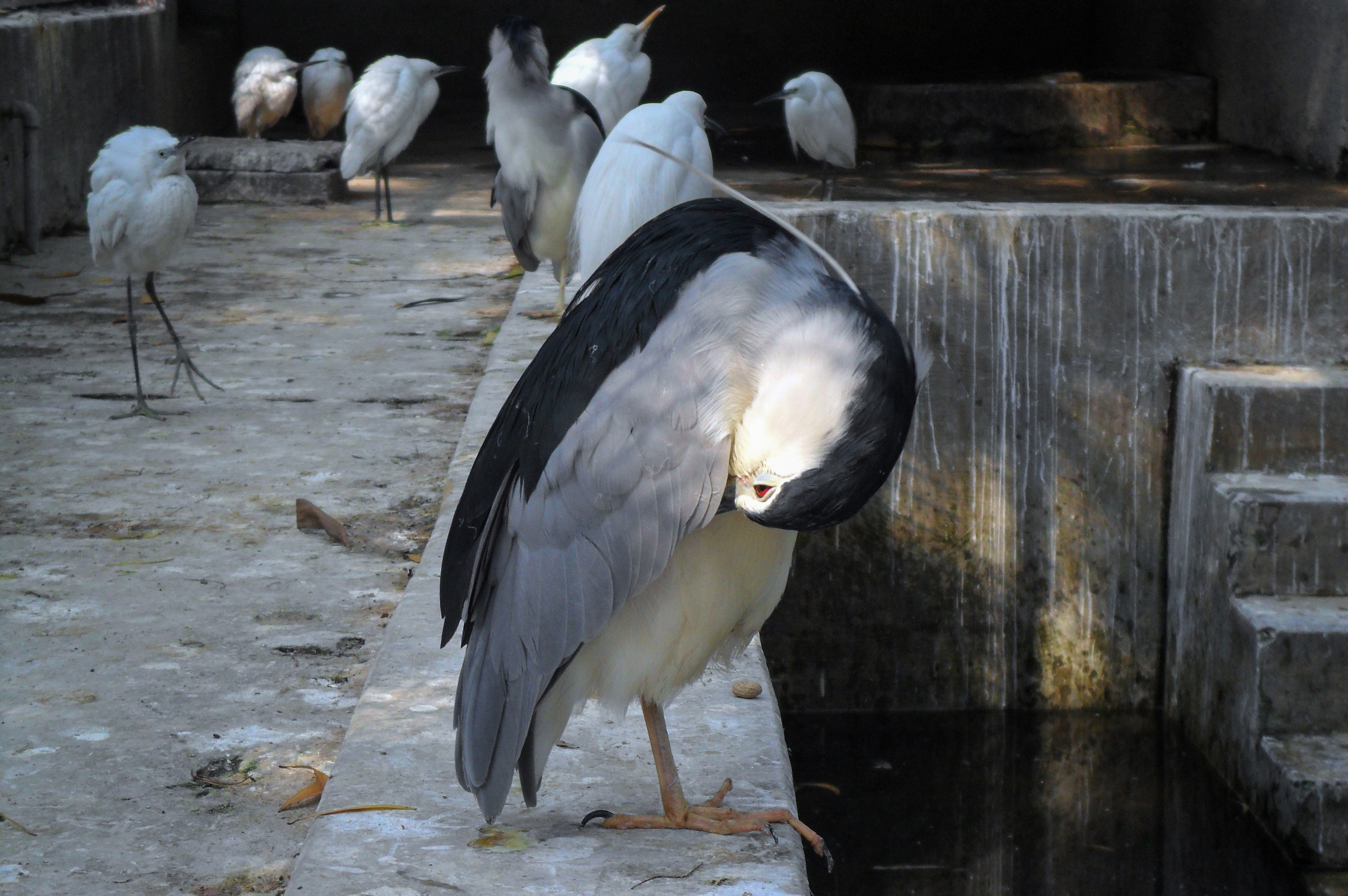
Ardea cinerea standing on one leg at their frame

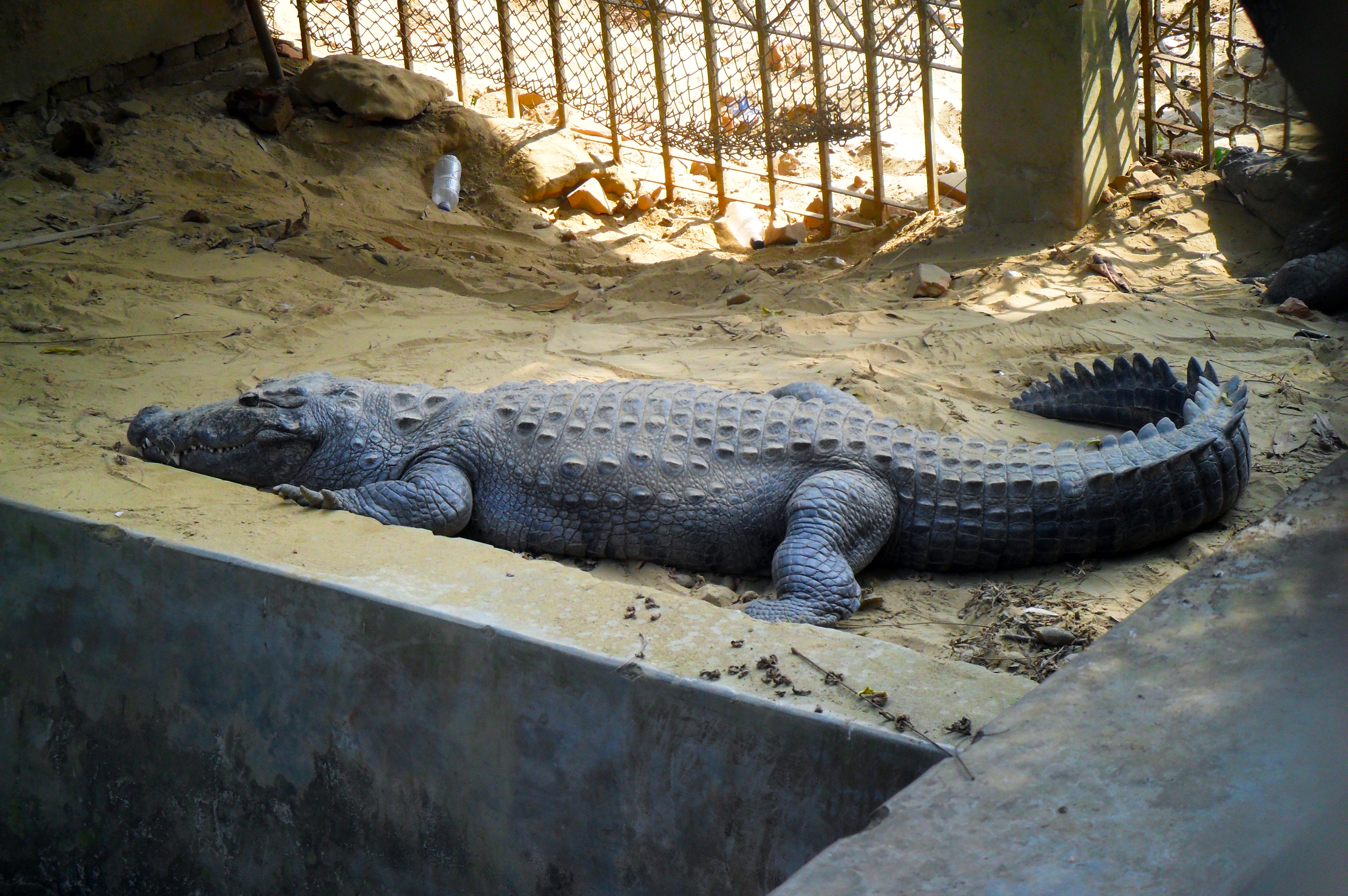
Mugger crocodile

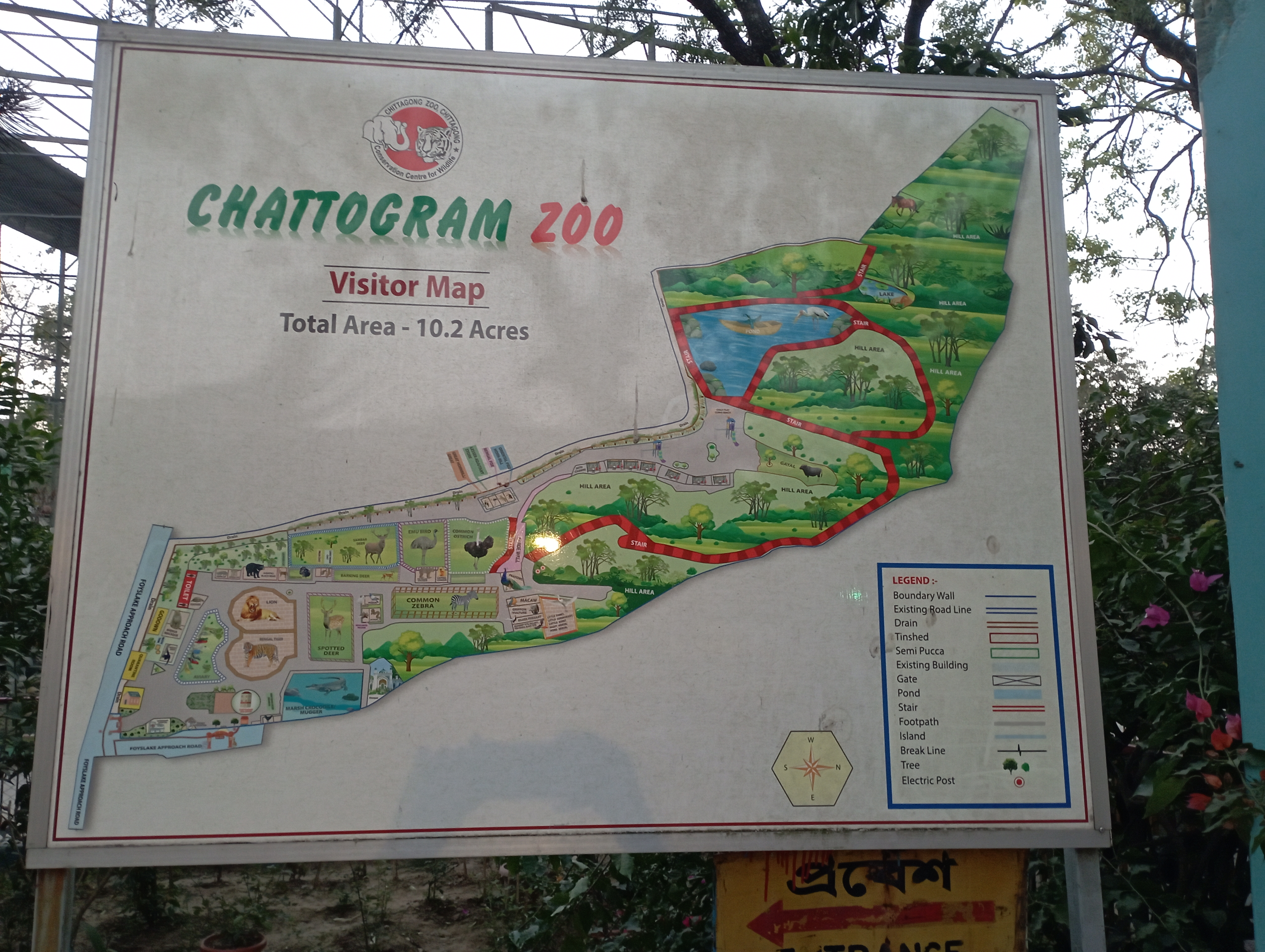
Chattogram Zoo map

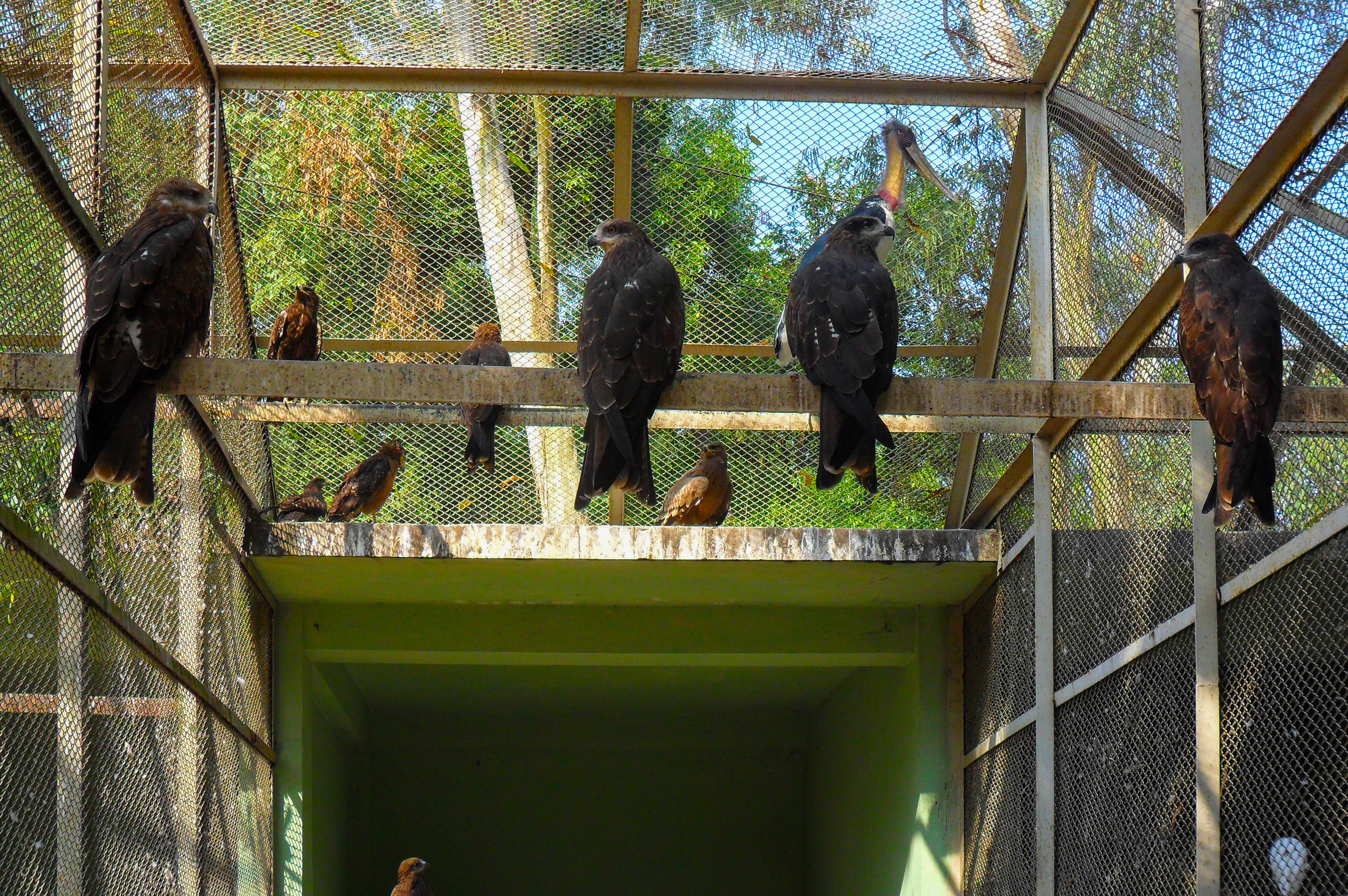
Black kite

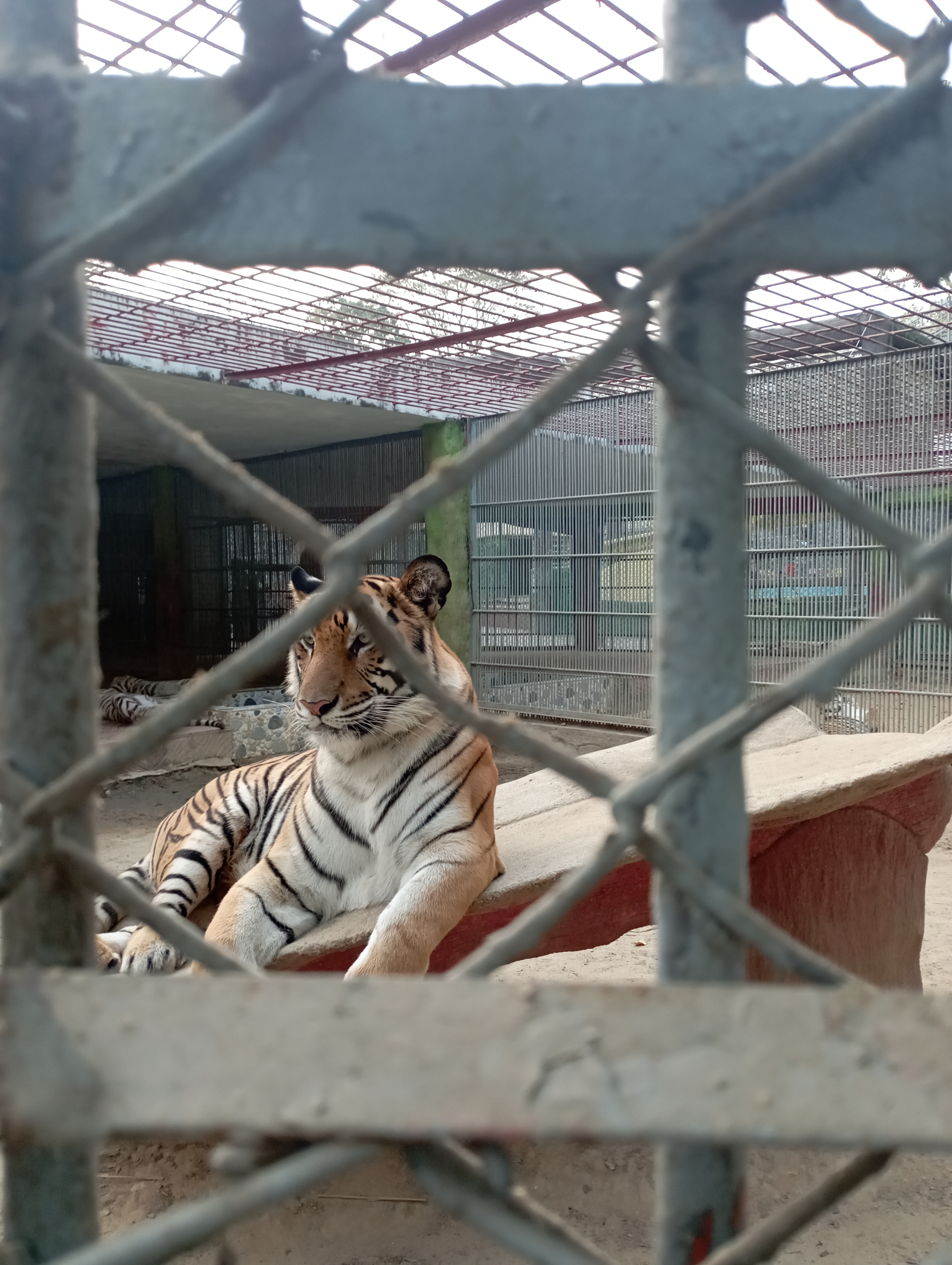
Bengal tiger

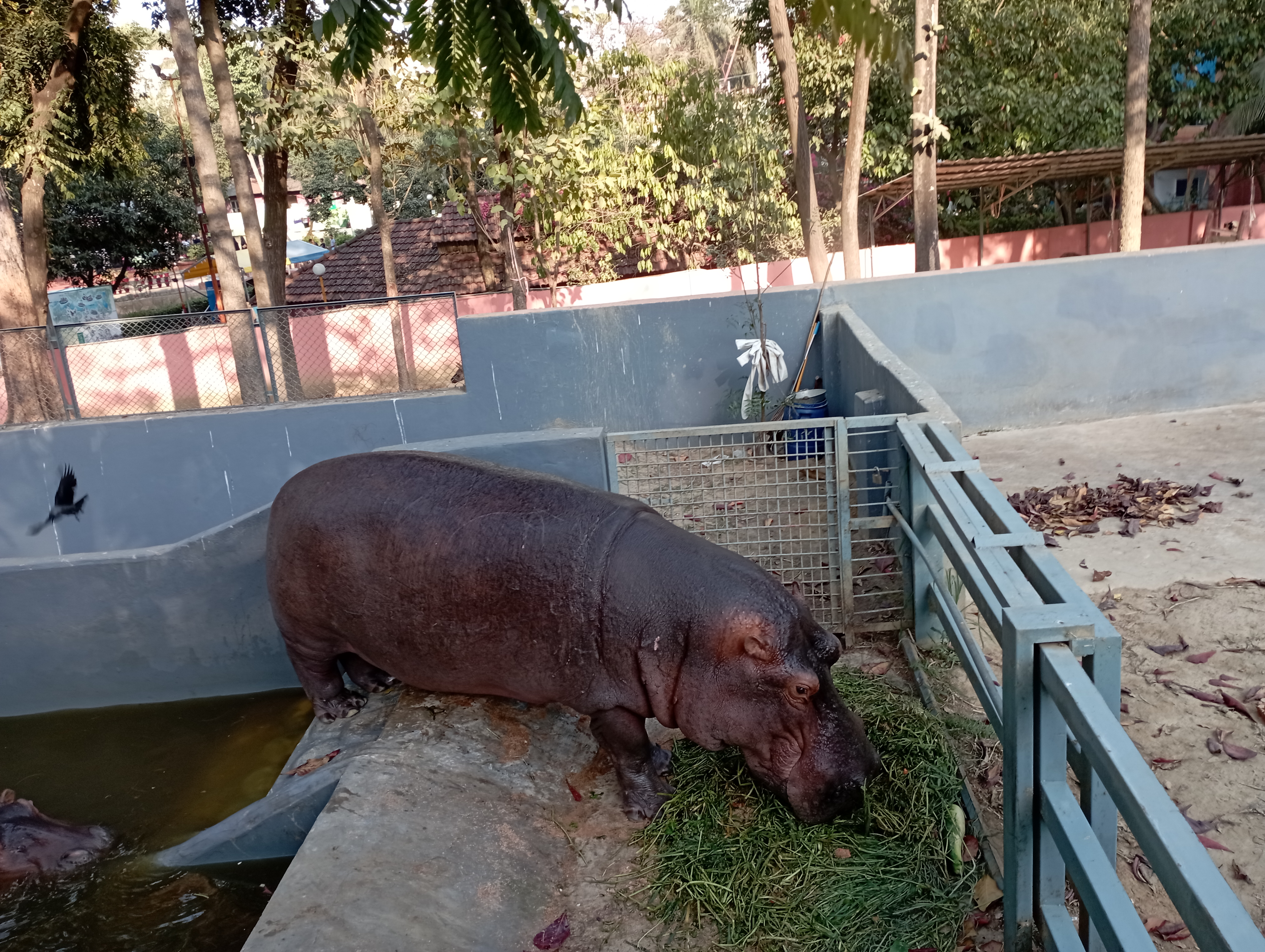
Hippopotamus

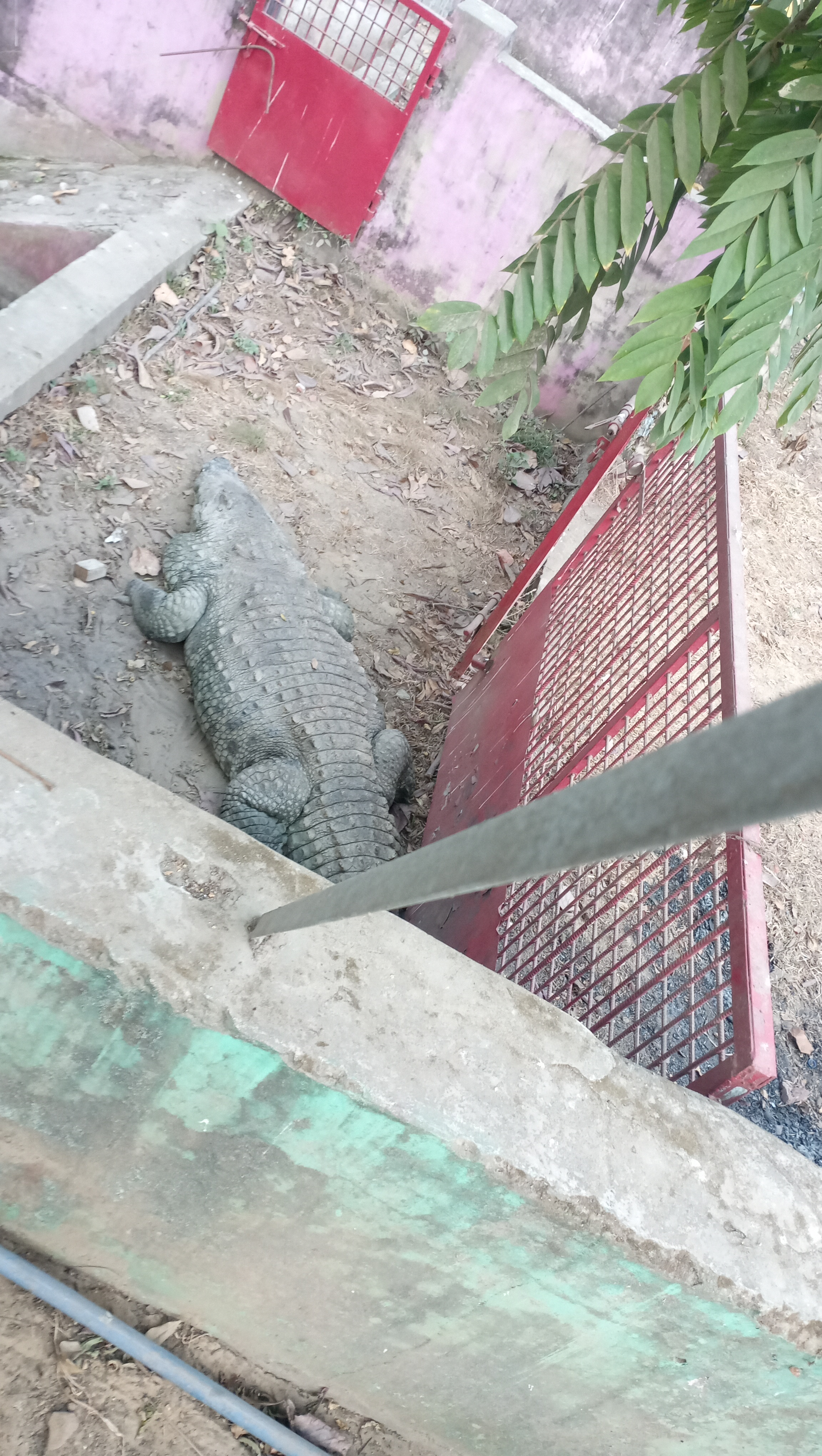
Marsh crocodile

== See also ==
- List of zoos in Bangladesh
