= Rangpur Zoo =

Zoo in Rangpur

Recreation Park and Rangpur Zoo
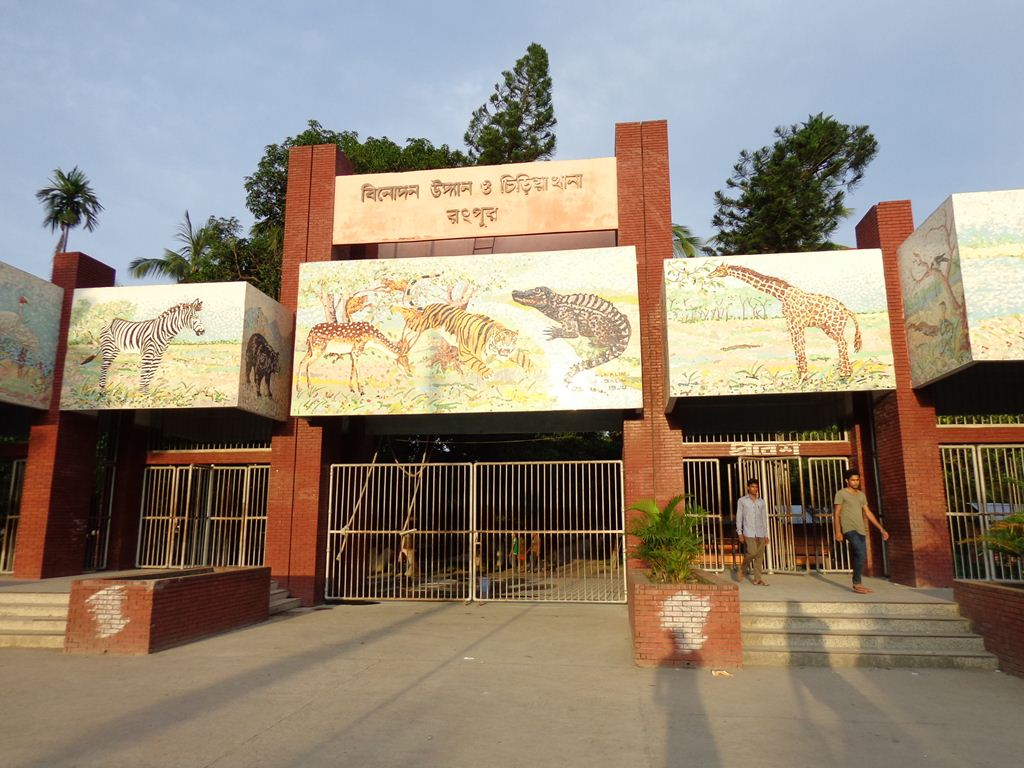
- Entrance
- Interactive map of Recreation Park and Rangpur Zoo
- 25°45′20.16″N 89°15′5.4″E
- Date opened: 1989
- Date opening: 1992
- Location: Police Line Rode, Hanuman-tola, Rangpur, Bangladesh
- Land area: 21.51 acres (8.70 ha)
- No. of animals: 215 (2018)
- No. of species: 26 (2018)

Recreation Park and Rangpur Zoo, (Bengali: বিনোদন উদ্যান ও রংপুর চিড়িয়াখানা) is located in Rangpur, Bangladesh, is the largest zoo in North Bengal and the second largest in Bangladesh in terms of size. With an area of 21.51 acres (8.70 ha) of lush green trees and grasses, the zoo is located east side of Hanuman-tola road beside Police Line Road, not far from Rangpur District Administration Office.

Rangpur Central Zoo is one of the recreation spots in Rangpur city.

== History ==
It was established in 1989, and two years later on June 14, 1991, it was opened to exhibit 23 species of animals. On August 14, 1988, the construction work of Rangpur Zoo started on 21.51 acres (8.70 ha) of land in front of Police Lines School and College, at a cost of Tk 18 million.

== Attractions ==
As of 2018, The zoo has 215 individual animals of 26 species, include Mammal, Aves and Reptilians. Many wild animals are available to attract the visitors. A few of them including 2 lions, 2 Bengal tiger, 1 hippopotamus, 2 crocodiles, 2 oysters, 3 peacocks, 1 bear, 1 keshowari, 1 horse, and 1 colobinae. There are different kinds of birds, including cassowary, vulture, turkey, parrots, peacocks, herons and so on.

There is also a park, a lake, restaurant, and different kinds of local plants.

Bangladesh University of Engineering and Technology (BUET) had completed a digital survey and feasibility study of "Dhaka And Rangpur Zoo Modernization Project" to upgrade the facilities to international standard.

== See also ==
- List of zoos in Bangladesh
