= Comilla Zoo and Botanical Garden =

- Interactive map of Comilla Zoo and Botanical Garden
- 23°28′20″N 91°10′17″E
- Date opened: 1986
- Location: Shaheed Shamsul Haque Sarak, Kaliajhuri, Comilla, Bangladesh
- Land area: 10.15 acres
- No. of animals: 16
- Major exhibits: A lion, seven different species of monkey, two bears, two river gulls, two Egyptian hens, a python and a hare

Comilla Zoo and Botanical Garden is a zoo and botanical garden located in the Kaliajhuri area of Comilla, Bangladesh. The zoo has an area of 10.15 acres.

== History ==
In 1986, The Zoo at City's Kaliajhuri in the area of 10.15 acres amid a Botanical garden built, now in a poor condition where different species of animals and birds are dropping off every year. The zoo has seventy five acres of land.

== Visitor attractions ==
Now only sixteen animals and birds are alive there but their condition is relentless, among them a lion, seven different species monkeys, two bears, two river gulls, two Egyptian hens, a python and a hare.

== Opening hours ==
Everyday 9:00 am – 6:00 pm.

== Gallery ==
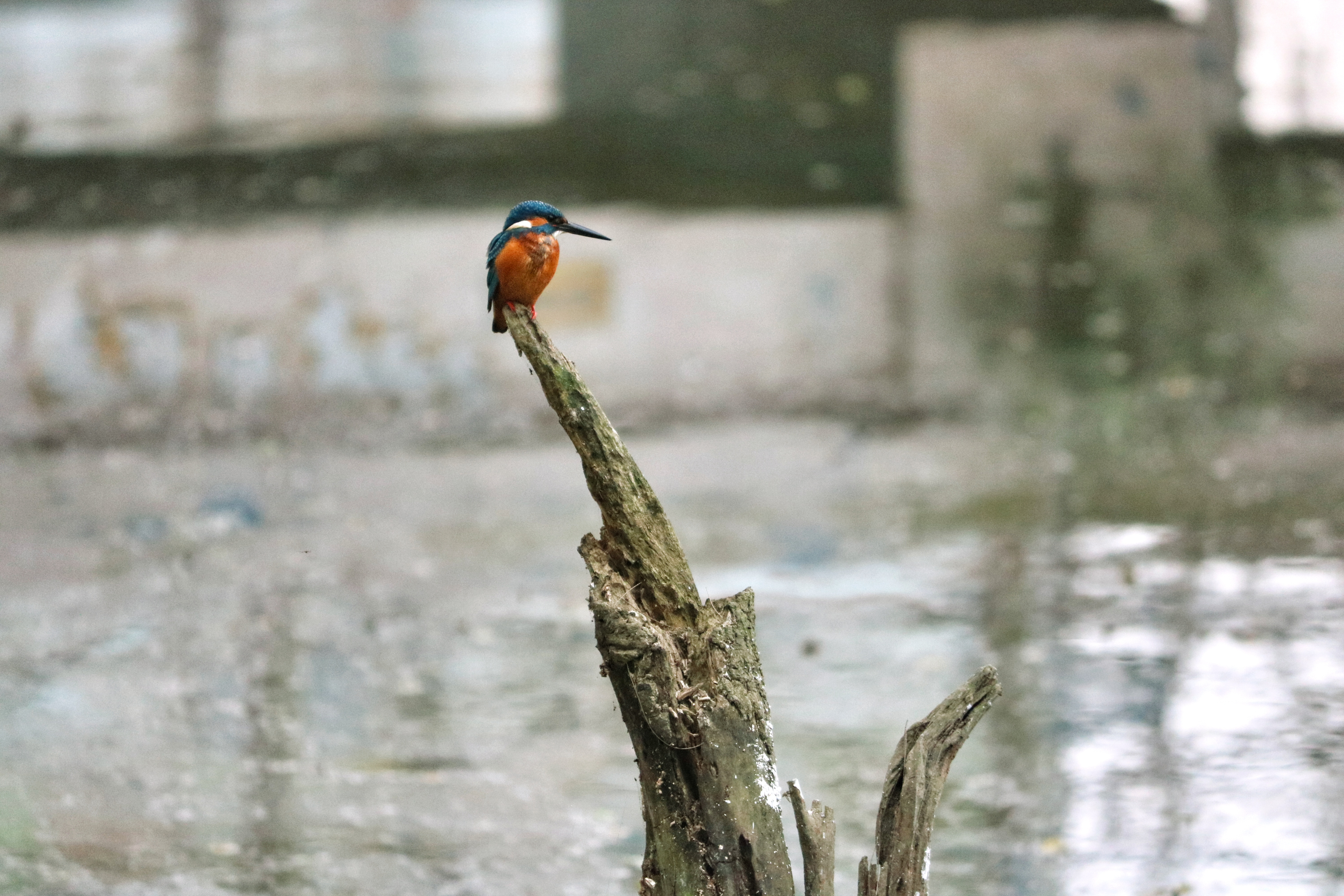

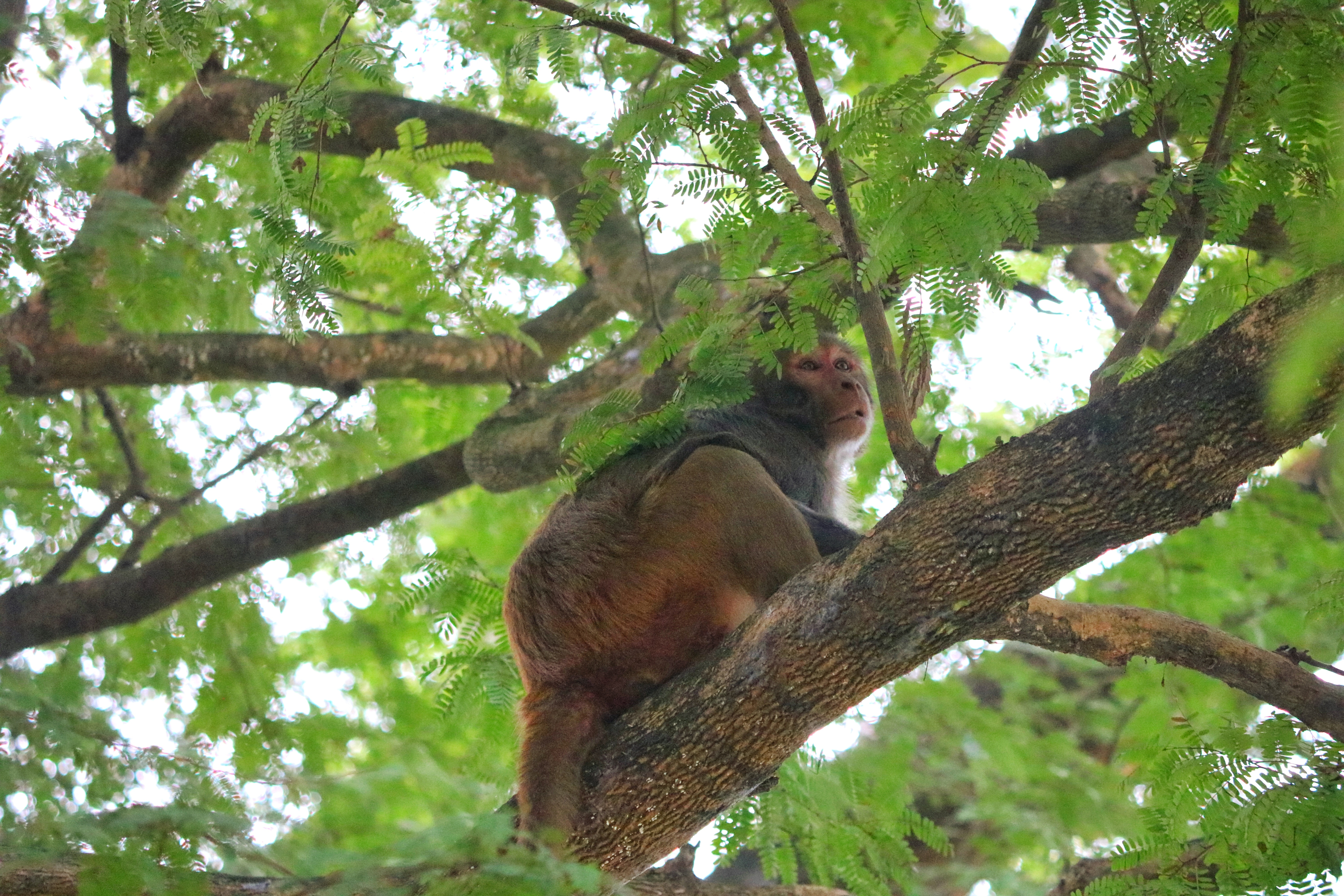

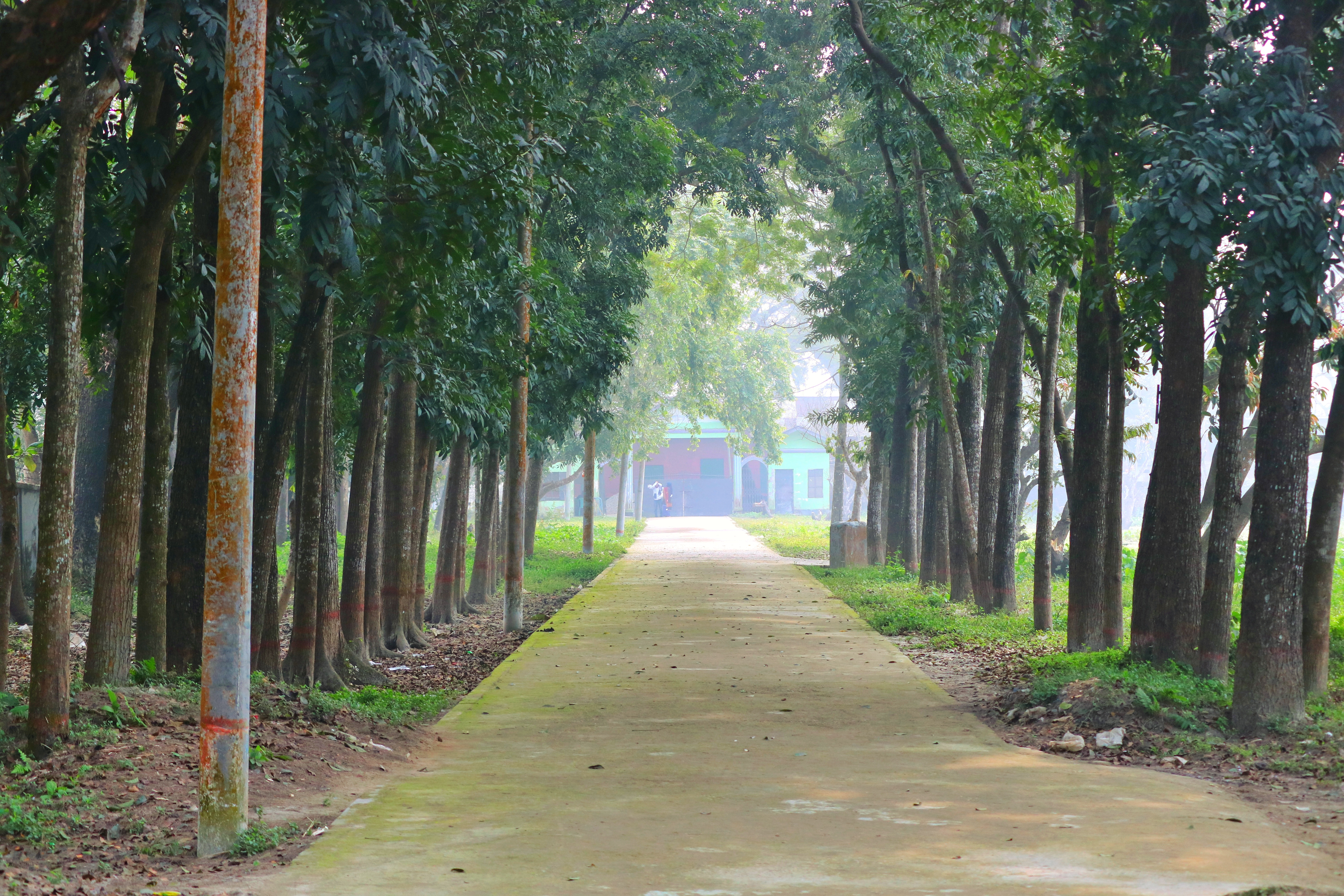

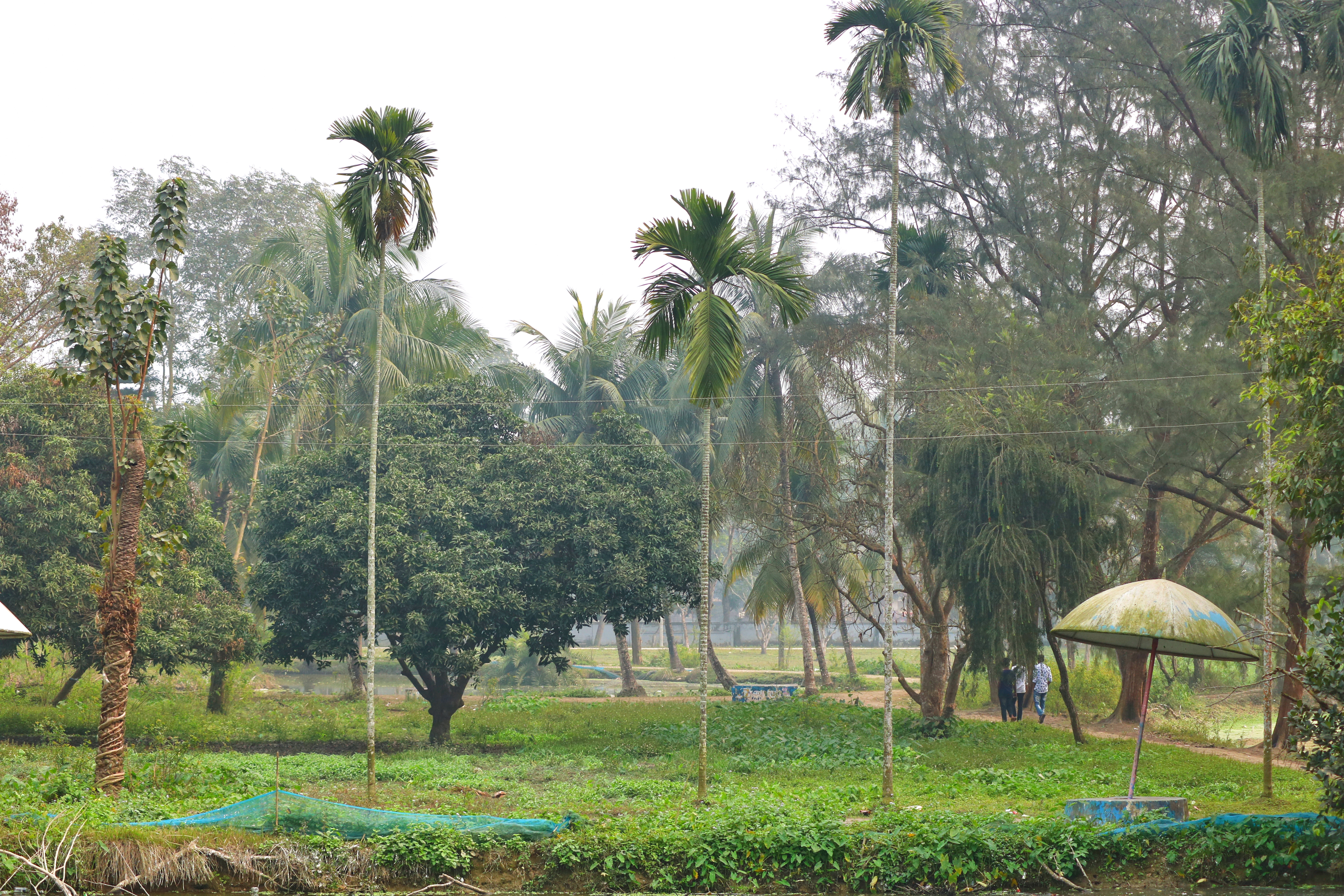

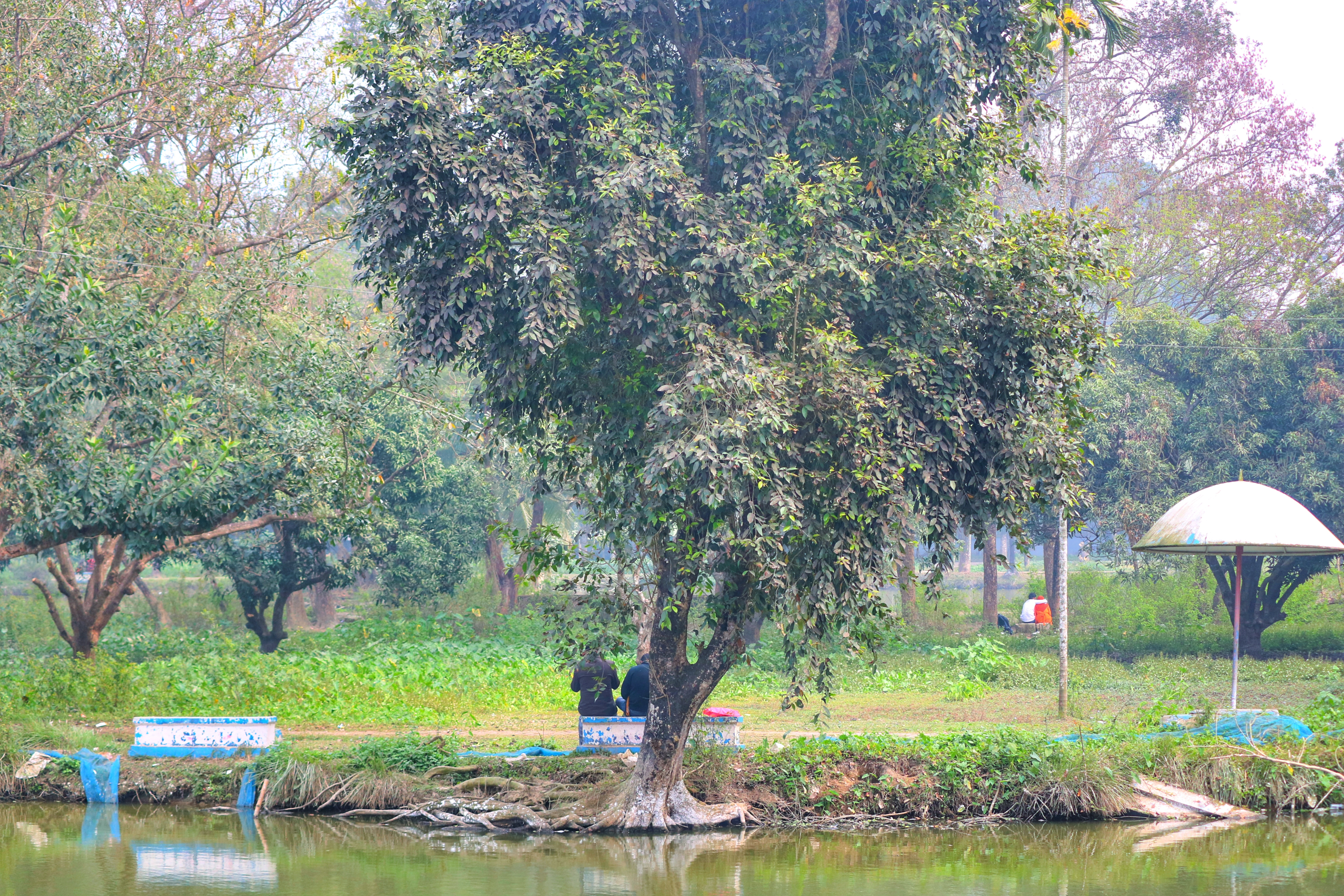

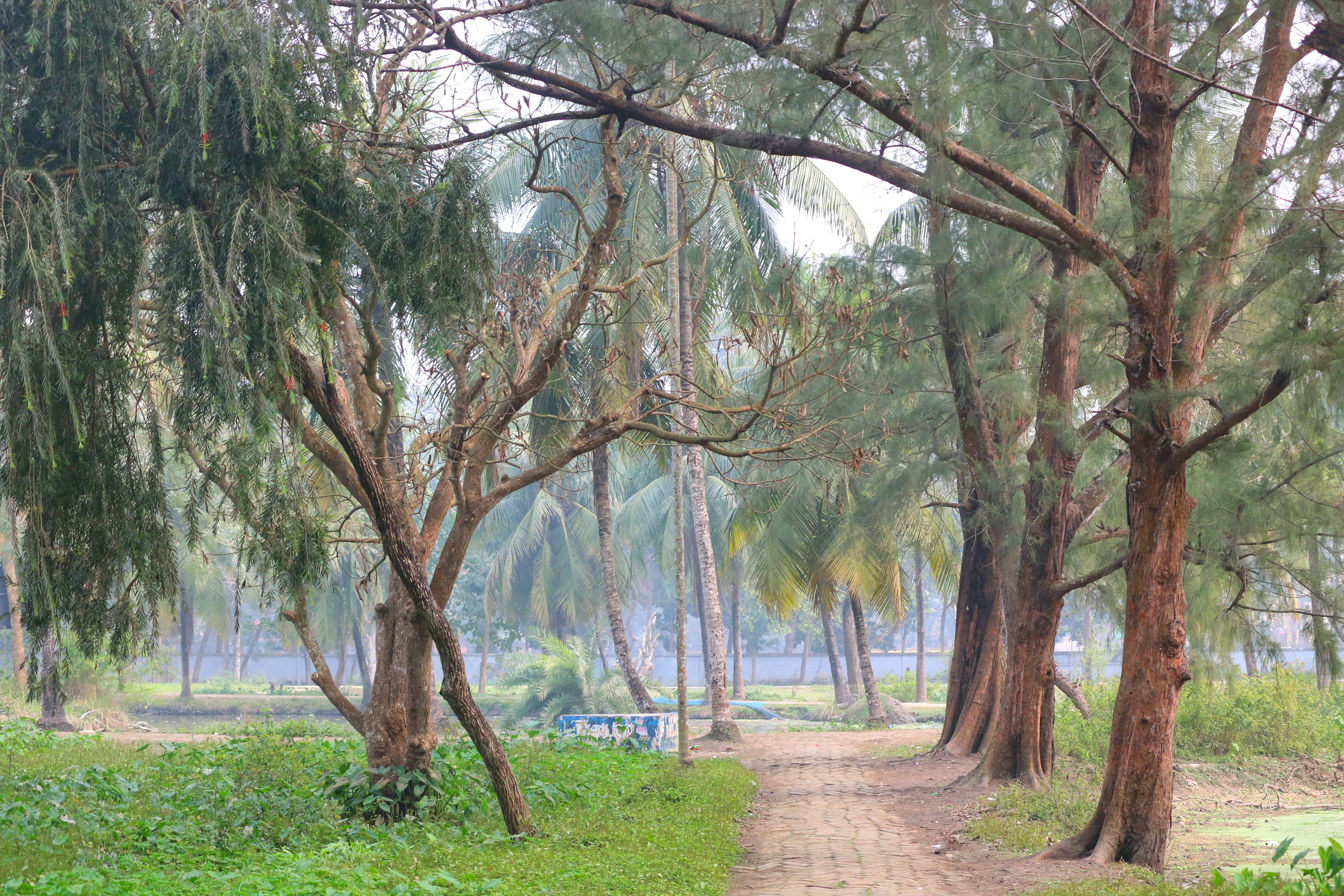

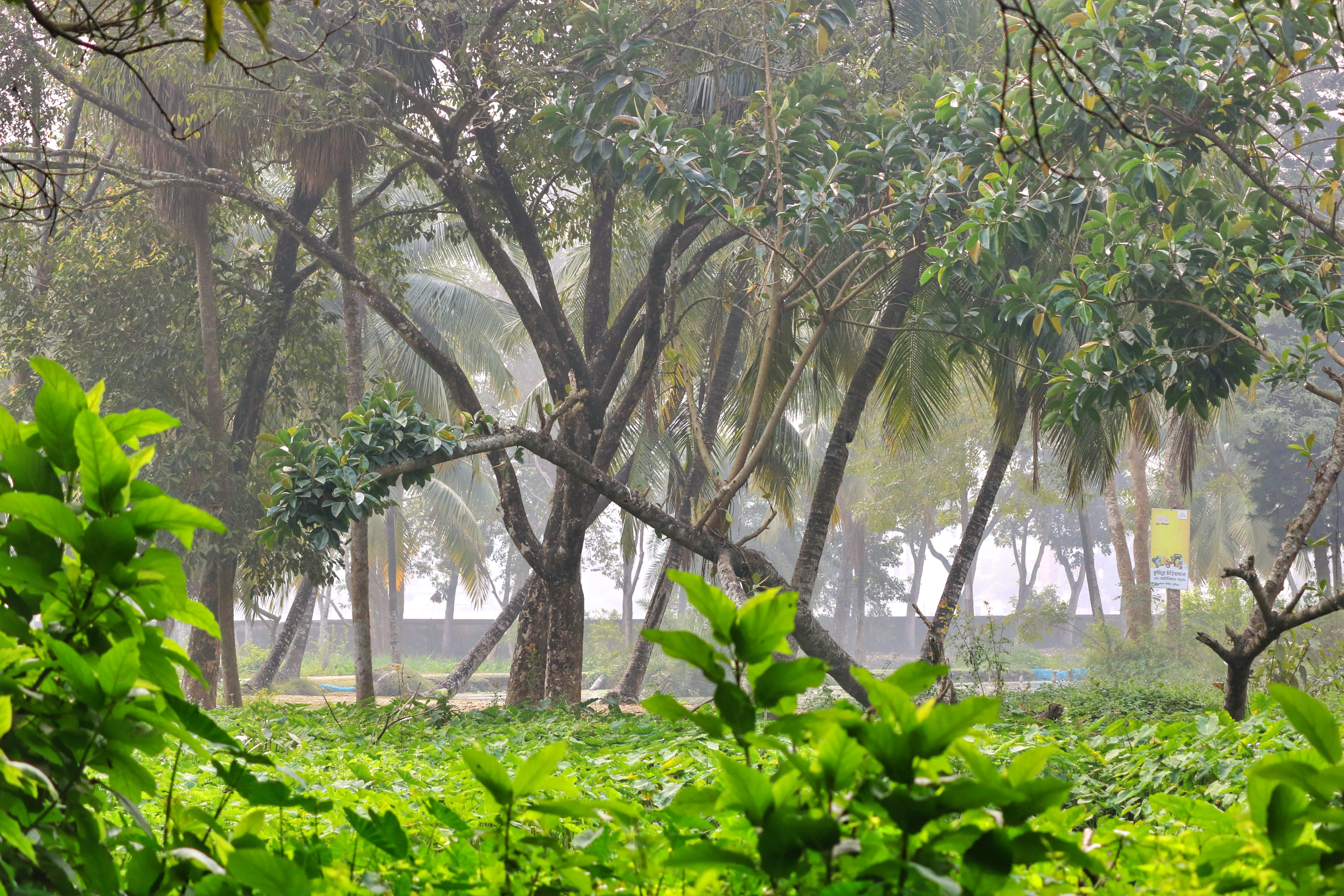

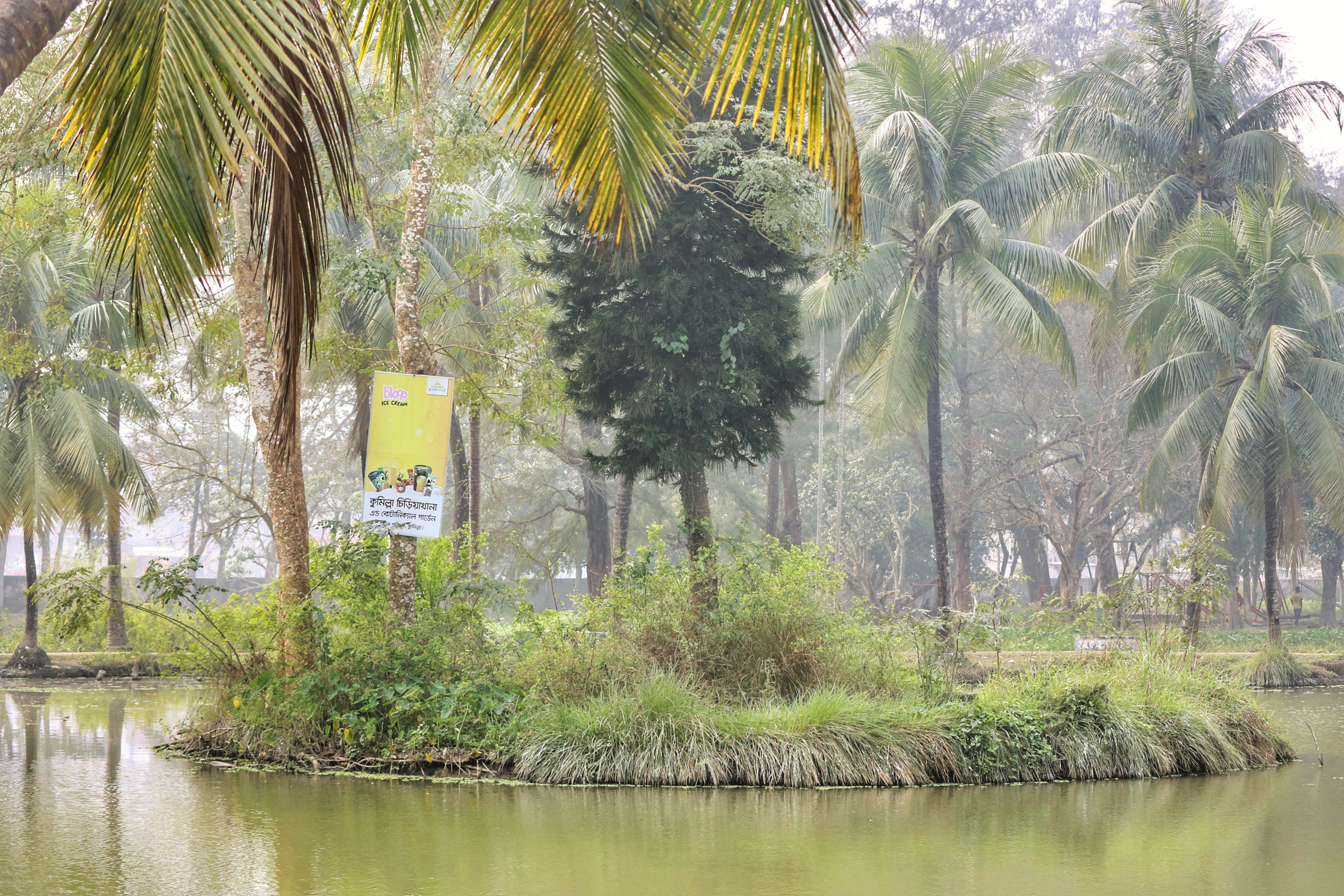

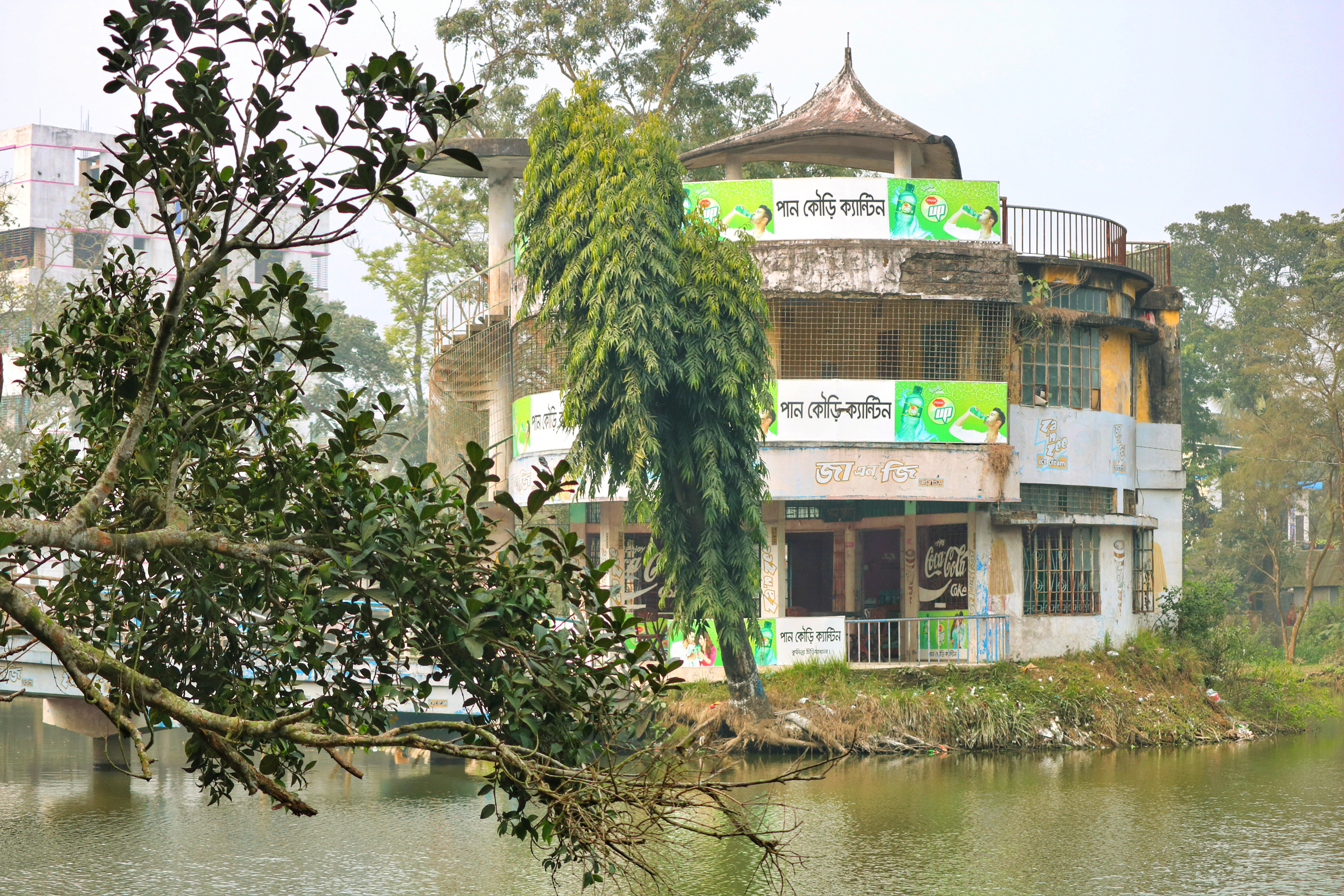

== See also ==
- Tourism in Bangladesh
- List of zoos in Bangladesh
- List of national parks of Bangladesh
- List of protected areas of Bangladesh
