= Shaheed A.H.M Qamaruzzaman Central Park and Zoo =

Public park and zoo in Rajshahi, Bangladesh

Coordinates: 24°22′08″N 88°34′17″E

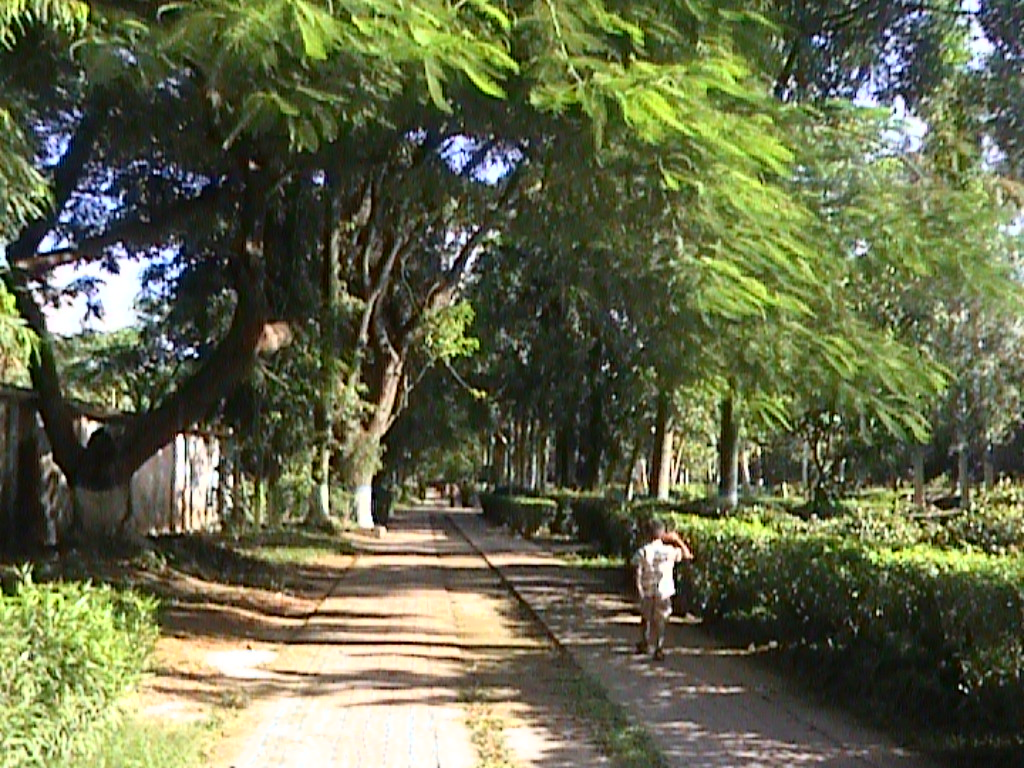
- Interactive map of Shaheed A.H.M Qamaruzzaman Central Park and Zoo
- Type: Urban park
- Location: Rajshahi
- Area: 33 acres (13 ha)
- Created: 1972
- Owner: Rajshahi City Corporation
- Status: Open all year

Shaheed A.H.M Qamaruzzaman Central Park and Zoo (Bengali: শহীদ এ.এইচ.এম কামারুজ্জামান কেন্দ্রীয় উদ্যান ও চিড়িয়াখানা) is a large public park and zoo located in Rajshahi, Bangladesh. Spanning 33 acres along the scenic banks of the Padma River, it serves as one of the city's most popular recreational spots for families, students, and tourists. The park is named after A.H.M Qamaruzzaman, a prominent national leader and one of the four key figures martyred in 1975.

== History ==
During the British colonial period, the area where the park now stands was used as a horse racecourse near the bend of the Padma River. After the British left, the land remained unused for many years. In the early 1970s, local political leader Abul Hasnat Muhammad Qamaruzzaman turned the abandoned space into a public park under the Rajshahi Zilla Parishad. The park was officially opened in 1972. In 1996, it was handed over to the Rajshahi City Corporation. A zoo was later added inside the park in 1983, making it a popular destination for recreation and education.

== Attractions and Activities ==
The park offers a wide range of attractions for visitors of all ages. A small lake at the center of the park features paddle boats, allowing families and children to enjoy a peaceful ride surrounded by greenery. Several artistic sculptures, a butterfly garden, and a beautifully designed bridge add to the park's charm.

One of the highlights is a small artificial hill that provides scenic views of the Padma River and the surrounding park. The children's play area includes swings, slides, and a Ferris wheel, making it a favorite destination for school trips and family outings.

The park also has shaded picnic spots, walking paths lined with eucalyptus and fruit trees, and seasonal flower displays. During holidays and festivals, the park becomes especially lively, attracting large crowds from across Rajshahi and nearby districts.

== Flora and Fauna ==
The park is home to a wide variety of trees and plants, including eucalyptus, mango, jackfruit, and medicinal herbs. Seasonal flower beds and a butterfly garden add vibrant color to the landscape, attracting visitors and pollinators alike.

The zoo inside the park features a diverse collection of animals, including Bengal tigers, spotted deer, crocodiles, monkeys, and pythons. There are also several species of birds such as peacocks, parakeets, and waterfowl. A small lake within the park supports fish and aquatic birds, creating a peaceful natural habitat.

Efforts have been made to improve animal enclosures and promote conservation awareness among visitors. The zoo serves both as a recreational space and an educational resource for students and nature lovers.

== Visitor Information ==
The park and zoo are open to the public every day from 8:00 am to 6:00 pm. The entry fee is 25 Bangladeshi Taka per person. Additional charges may apply for picnic spots or group events.

The park is located about 3 kilometers from Rajshahi city center and is easily accessible by rickshaw or auto-rickshaw. Parking facilities are available near the main entrance.

During weekends, school holidays, and festivals, the park attracts large numbers of visitors, including students on educational trips and families enjoying leisure time. It is recommended to visit in the morning or late afternoon for a more comfortable experience.

== Gallery ==
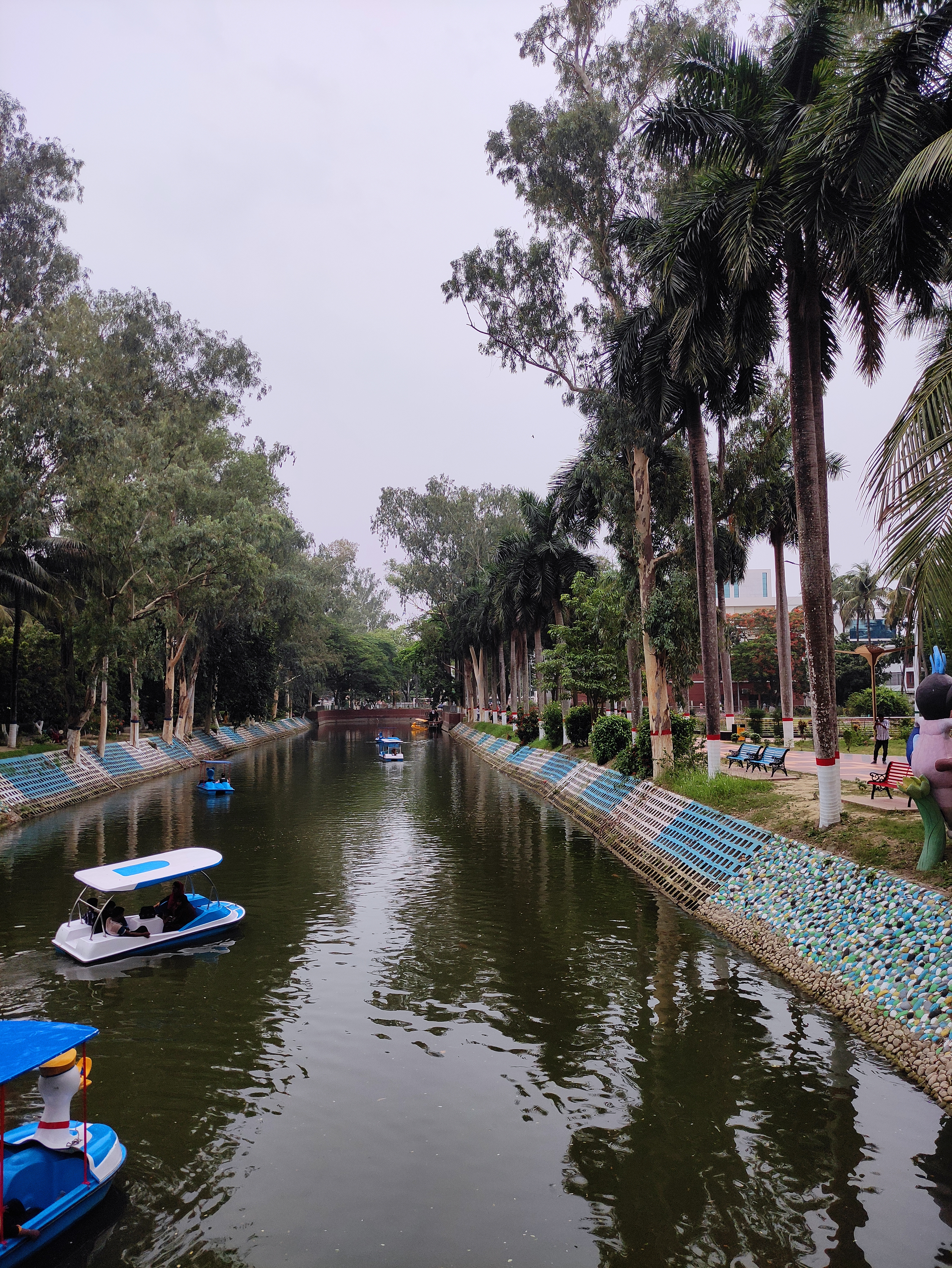
Paddle boats on the lake

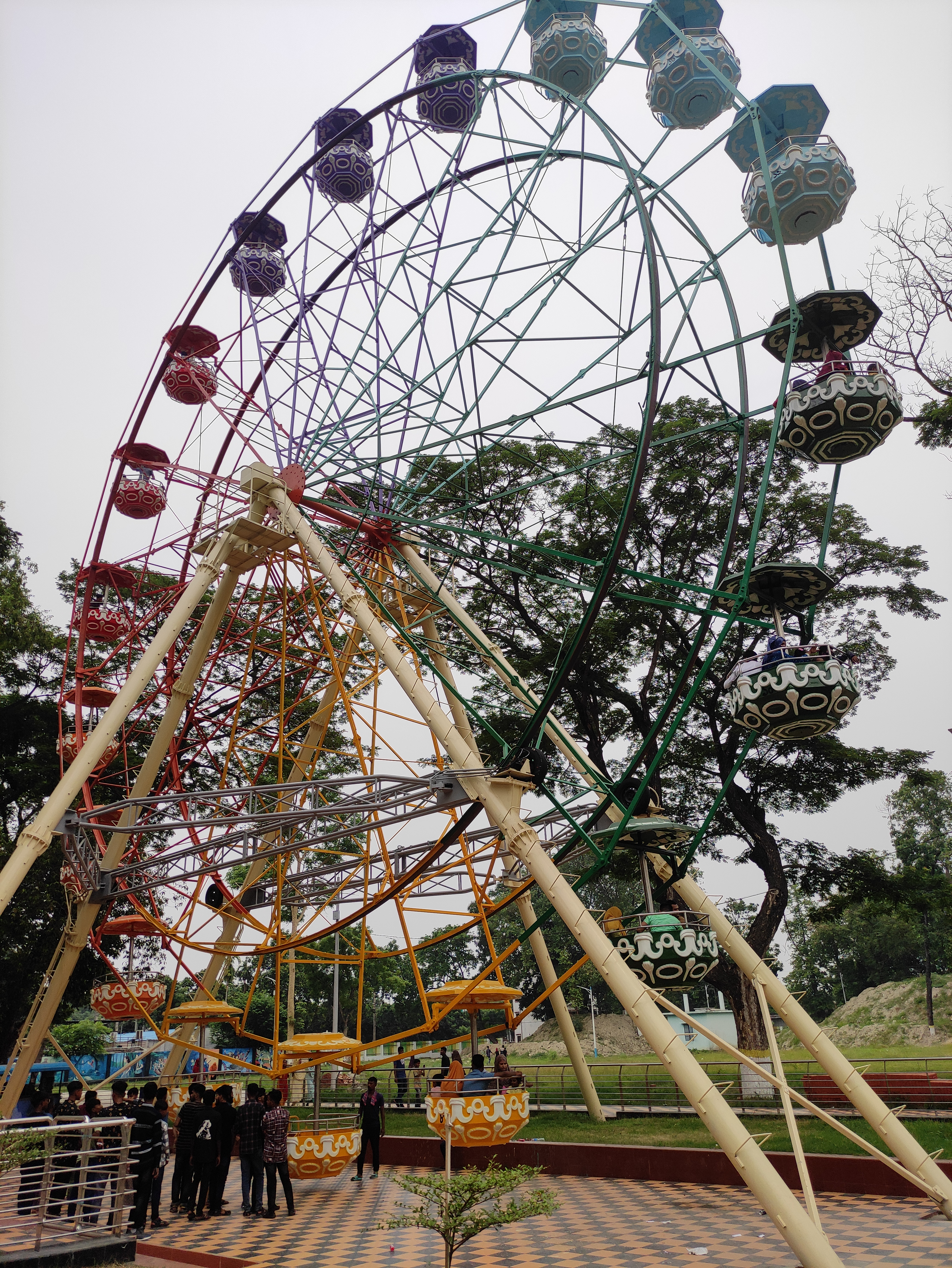
Ferris wheel in the children's zone

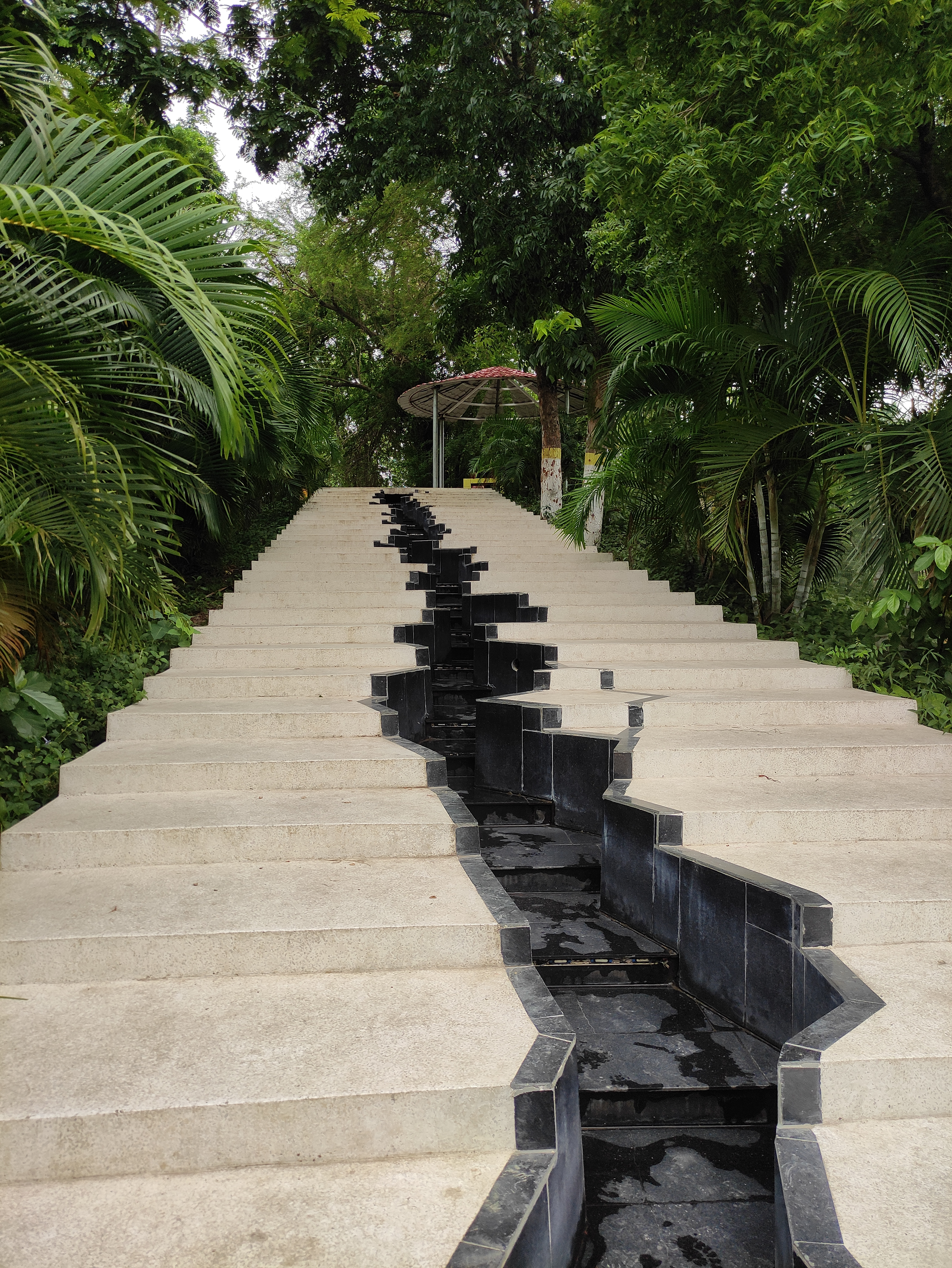
Artificial waterfall inside the park

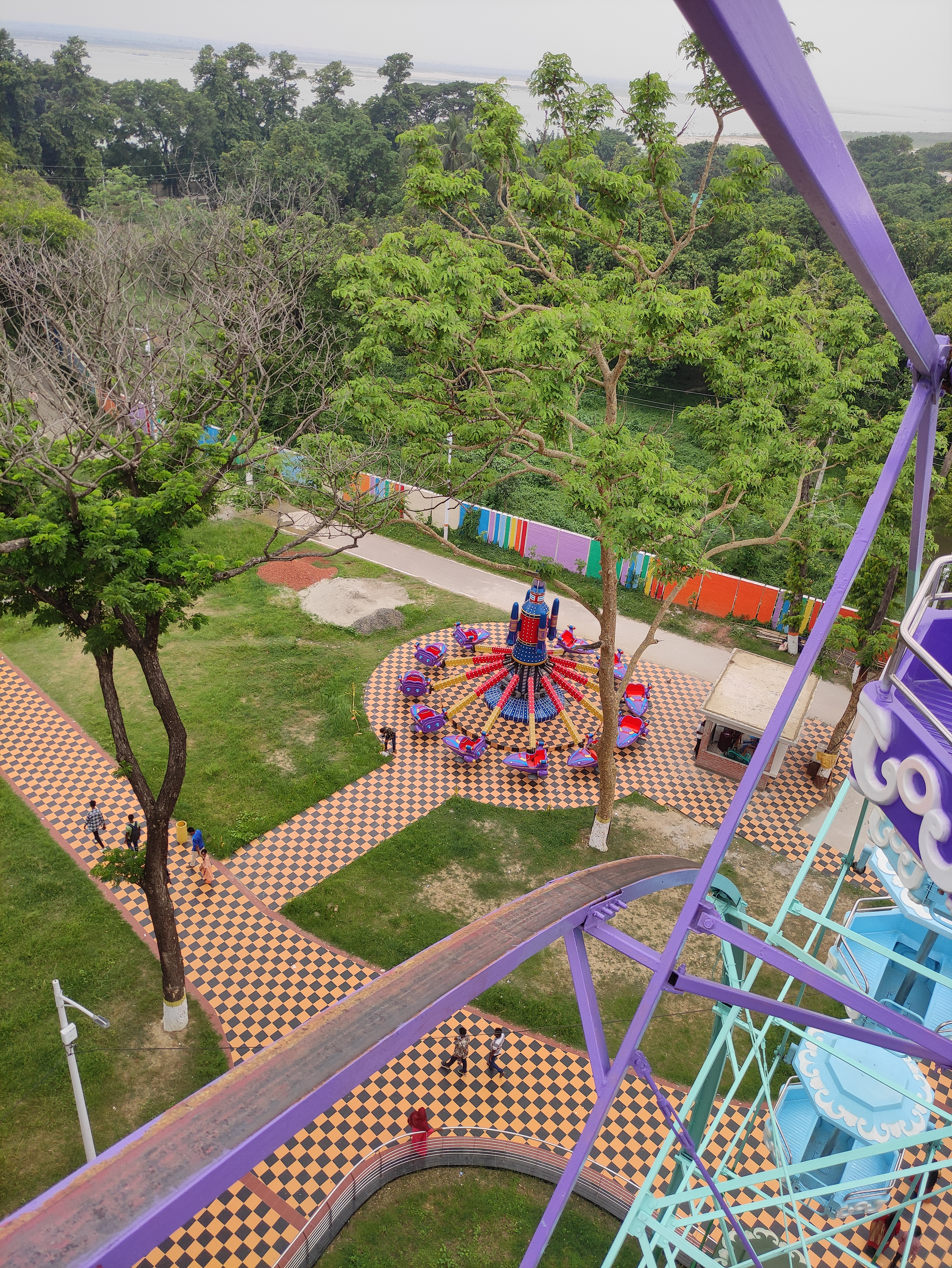
Colorful rides for children

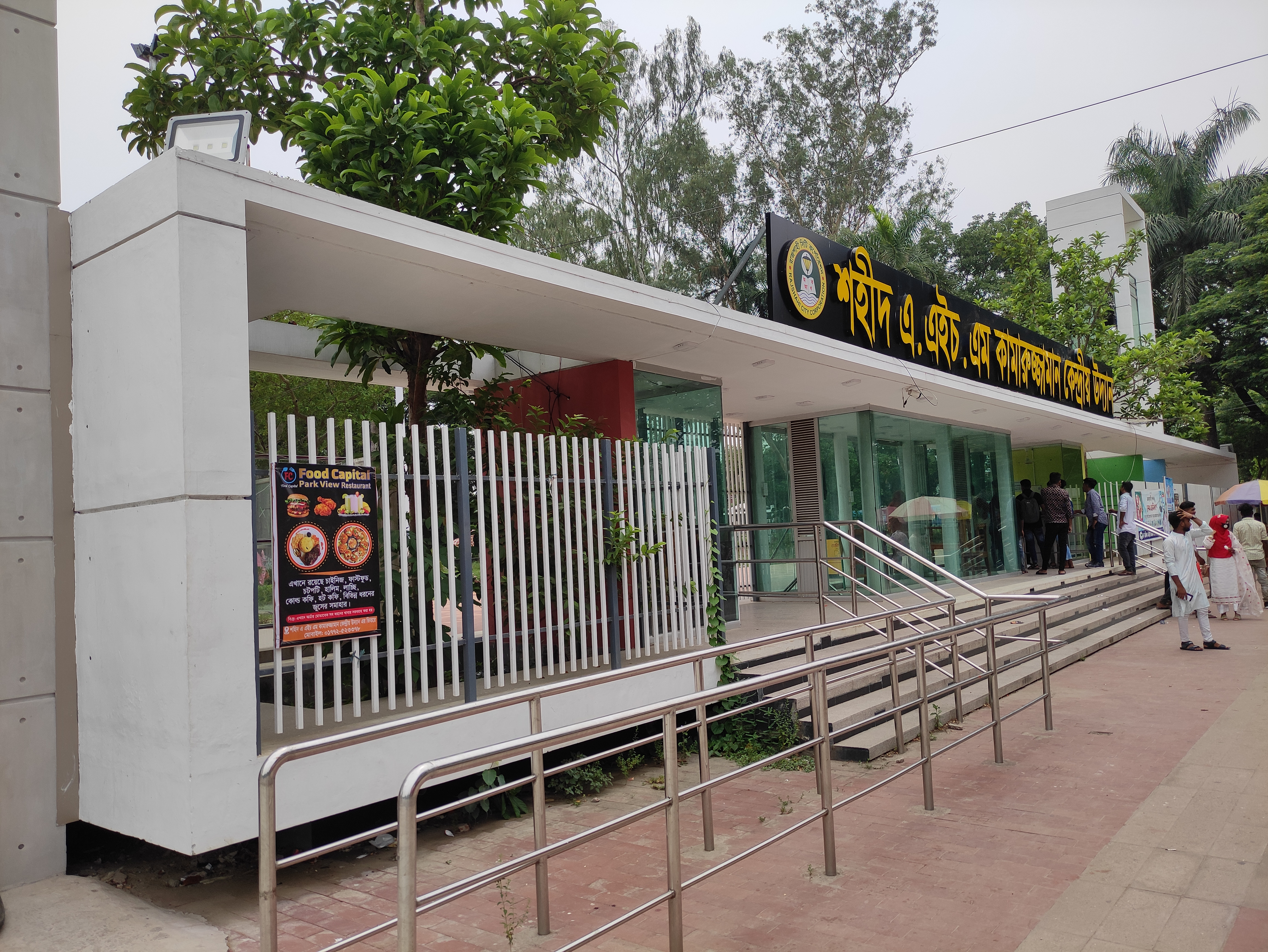
Main entrance of the park
