= Datta High School =

Dutt High School
- দত্ত উচ্চ বিদ্যালয়

Location
- Moktarpara, Netrakona; Bangladesh; 24.8804°N 90.7321°E

Information
- Type: Secondary school (MPO)
- Motto: জ্ঞানই শক্তি (Knowledge is Power)
- Established: February 6, 1889
- School district: Netrakona District
- Head teacher: Muhammad Mojibur Rahman (acting)
- Faculty: 59
- Grades: 1–10 (SSC)
- Gender: Co-educational
- Enrollment: 2,834
- Language: Bangla
- Campus size: 4.33 acres (1.75 ha)
- Campus type: Urban
- Colors: Blue & White
- Nickname: DHS
- Publication: বার্ষিকী (annual school magazine)
- Affiliation: Mymensingh Education Board
- Website: dutt.edu.bd

Dutt High School (Bengali: দত্ত উচ্চ বিদ্যালয়, romanized: Datta Uchcha Bidyalaya) is a secondary school in Netrakona, Bangladesh. Established on 6 February 1889, it is the oldest secondary school in Netrakona District and one of the oldest continuously operating educational institutions in the Mymensingh Division. Named after Romesh Chunder Dutt, the District Magistrate and Collector of Mymensingh who facilitated its founding, the school is affiliated with the Board of Intermediate and Secondary Education, Mymensingh and operates under the Monthly Pay Order (MPO) scheme of the Government of Bangladesh.

The school has historically served as a centre of student political movements in Netrokona, with its students playing active roles in the Bengali language movement, the Six point movement, the 1969 East Pakistan mass uprising, the Bangladesh Liberation War, and the anti-autocratic movement of 1990.

== History ==
=== Founding ===
Dutt High School originated from an indigenous learning centre known as Gangacharan's Pathshala, which operated during the 1880s. In the late nineteenth century, local leaders of the Swadeshi movement and the Zamindars of Gouripur sought to establish a formalized secondary school in the Netrokona subdivision of Mymensingh District to prepare students for university-level matriculation.

The school was formally established on 6 February 1889 through the efforts of Romesh Chunder Dutt, then District Magistrate and Collector of Mymensingh. A prominent member of the Indian Civil Service, Dutt was also a noted novelist, historian, and economist who critiqued the economic policies of British India. During an official tour of the subdivision, he noted the absence of a high school and helped coordinate with local benefactors and the Zamindars to found one. The institution was named in his honour.

The school secured affiliation with the University of Calcutta, the pre-eminent academic authority in eastern India, shortly after its founding. For a considerable period under British rule, it remained the only school in the Netrokona region to hold this recognition. By 1895, students were sitting for the entrance examination under Calcutta University, and in 1900, Rajendra Kumar Dutt placed ninth in the examination. Records in the Calcutta Gazette from the 1930s and 1940s list "Netrokona Dutt High School Centre" as an examination hub.

=== Women's education and cultural life ===
In the 1930s, Dutt High School played a pioneering role in promoting women's education in Netrokona. Although three high schools existed in the town, none admitted female students. In 1933, Jainesh Ranjan Roy, the chief rector, opened a separate section for girls beginning with eight students in the seventh grade. By 1937, eight candidates from this section had passed the entrance examinations.

The school also distinguished itself culturally. In 1930, it organized a large-scale Rabindra Jayanti, the birth anniversary celebration of Rabindranath Tagore, outside Santiniketan, making it one of the earliest such celebrations in the Bengal countryside. The principal organizer was Shailaja Ranjan Majumder, an alumnus who later became Principal of the Music Bhaban at Visva-Bharati University.

=== Political movements ===
Dutt High School has long functioned as a centre of student activism in Netrokona. The school stands adjacent to the Netrokona Shaheed Minar, which commemorates the language martyrs. Its students played active roles in several defining movements in the history of Bangladesh.

During the Bengali language movement of 1952, students took part in localized strikes and protests supporting the demand to establish Bengali as a state language of Pakistan. In 1966, students helped disseminate the six-point programme articulated by Sheikh Mujibur Rahman across the rural and semi-urban populations of the Netrokona subdivision. The 1969 East Pakistan mass uprising saw significant mobilization from the school against the military regime of Ayub Khan. It was during this period that the revolutionary poetry of alumnus Helal Hafiz, particularly Nishiddho Sampadakiya (The Banned Editorial), gained widespread popularity. During the Bangladesh Liberation War of 1971, students actively participated in the struggle for independence, with several documented freedom fighters among them. Students also joined the 1990 Bangladesh mass uprising that led to the fall of the Ershad government.

=== Role in founding Netrakona College ===
In 1949, shortly after the Partition of India, local leaders mobilized to establish Netrakona Government College so that graduates of the region would not have to travel to distant cities such as Dhaka or Mymensingh for higher education. When the college began operations under Principal Priobhushon Bonik with seven teachers, it lacked its own infrastructure. During this formative period, all administrative work and logistical coordination for the new college were conducted from the hostel facilities of Dutt High School.

== Campus ==
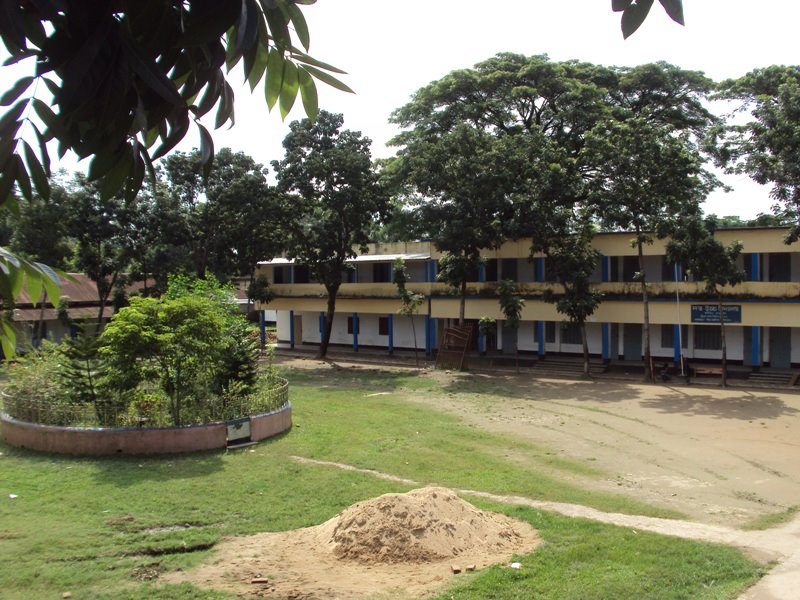
Dutt High School playground

The school is situated in Moktarpara, the central administrative area of Netrakona, directly opposite Netrokona Government Girls High School and beside the Netrakona Shaheed Minar. The main campus spans 4.33 acres (1.75 ha), the largest secondary school campus by land area in Netrakona District. The school also maintains a separate playground in the Joynagar Mouza within the city limits.

Approximately 50 commercial shop fronts line the street-facing periphery of the campus, and the rental income from these provides the institution with financial autonomy beyond its government MPO subsidies. A two-storey commercial centre was later constructed on the campus perimeter to further augment this revenue. The school library holds between 4,500 and 5,000 volumes.

== Academics ==
Dutt High School offers education from Grade 1 through Grade 10, culminating in the Secondary School Certificate (SSC) examination under the Board of Intermediate and Secondary Education, Mymensingh. It comprises a co-educational kindergarten section from play group to class five and two secondary sections, one for boys and one for girls, from class six to SSC.

In 2015, the school adopted a double-shift system to accommodate growing enrolment. Girls attend the morning shift (7:30 AM to 12:30 PM) and boys attend the afternoon shift (12:00 PM to 5:30 PM). The school enrols approximately 2,834 students across 40 class sections, taught by 59 teachers.

Classrooms have been digitalized with multimedia tools and a centralized CCTV monitoring system, and the school operates a dedicated computer and ICT laboratory. In the 2016 SSC examinations, it achieved a pass rate of 96%, with 42 students obtaining the highest grade of GPA-5.00.

== Notable alumni ==
- Nalini Ranjan Sarkar (1882–1953) – Finance Minister of Bengal (1937), Mayor of the Calcutta Corporation (1935), and member of the Viceroy's Executive Council
- Shailaja Ranjan Majumder – Principal of the Music Bhaban, Visva-Bharati University, Santiniketan
- Helal Hafiz (1948–2024) – poet, author of Je Jale Agun Jwale, recipient of the Bangla Academy Literary Award (2013) and Ekushey Padak (2025, posthumous)
- Siddiqur Rahman – Cabinet Secretary of Bangladesh
- Dr. Kamal Siddiqui – Principal Secretary to the Prime Minister of Bangladesh
- Hasan Mahmud Khandakar – Inspector General of Police and Ambassador
- Amitabha Chowdhury – journalist and author based in Kolkata
- Dr. Mofakkarul Islam Bhuiyan – founder of the Mymensingh Community Based Hospital

== See also ==
- Netrokona Government Girls High School
- Netrakona Government College
- Romesh Chunder Dutt
- Education in Bangladesh
