= Hafiz Rashid Khan =

Bangladeshi post-colonialist poet, editor, writer and journalist

- হাফিজ রশিদ খান
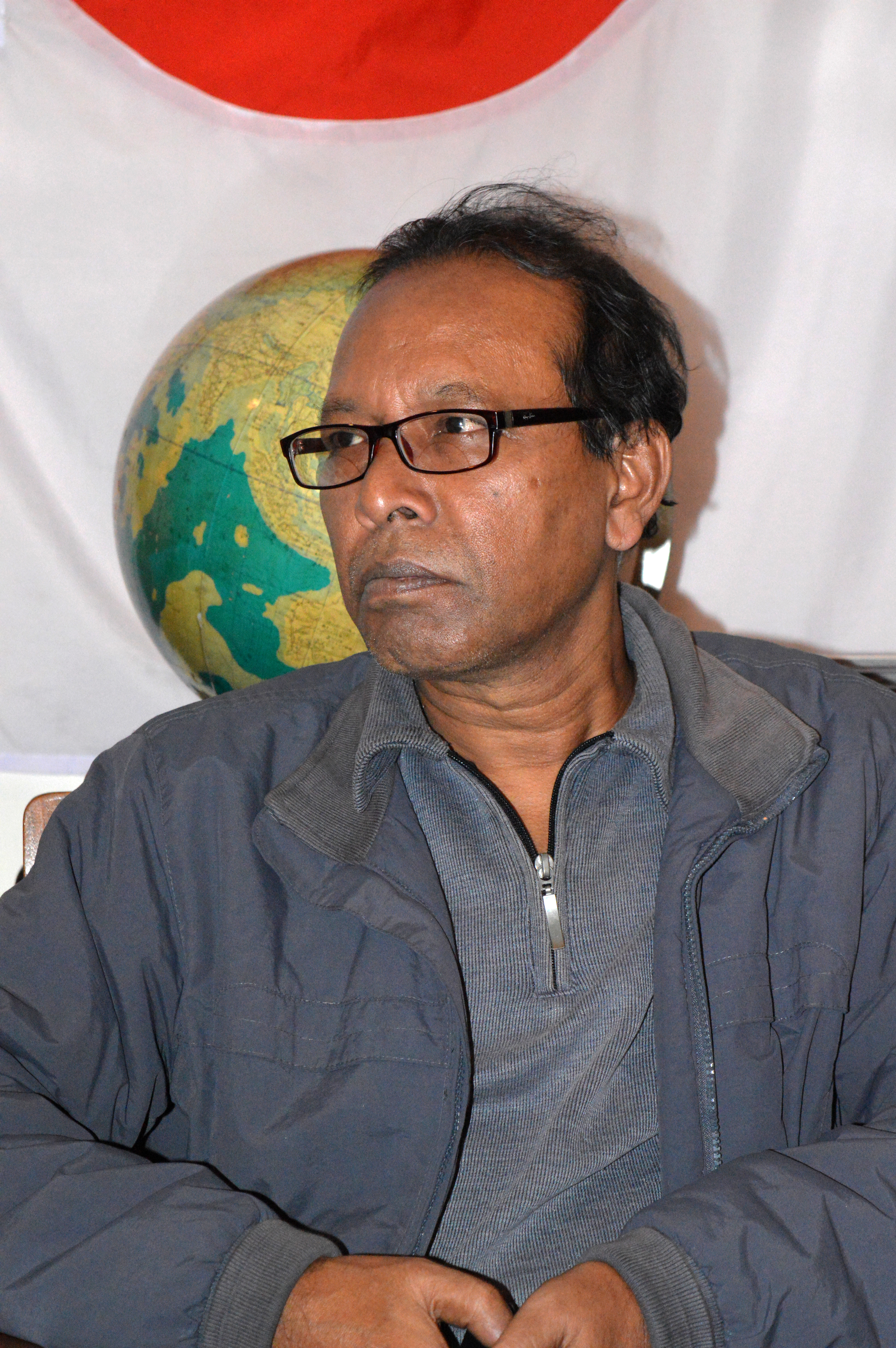
- Hafiz at Bengali Wikipedia's celebration in Chattogram.
- Born: June 23, 1961 (age 64); Banshkhali, Chittagong, East Pakistan (now Bangladesh)
- Education: Bachelor
- Alma mater: University of Chittagong; Chittagong College
- Occupations: poet; author; editor; journalist
- Years active: 1982–present
- Employer: Journalist
- Organization: Suprobhat Bangladesh
- Notable work: Upajati and Adibaasi poetry
- Spouse: Milattunnesa Khanom (m. 1995)
- Awards: Chittagong City Corporation Literary Award (2016)

Hafiz Rashid Khan (Bengali: হাফিজ রশিদ খান, born June 23, 1961) is a Bangladeshi postcolonialist poet, author, editor, journalist and Adibaasi researcher. His literary philosophy mostly comes from the practice of the Neo-colonialism and known as postcolonialist writer and reputed for working in the tribal area at the Chittagong Hill Tracts in Bangladesh. As of 2019, he has authored twenty-five titles, including fifteen poetry and eight criticism.

In 1982 at his twenty one years age his first poetry was published from Chittagong. In 2018 he published fifteen and the last poetry book titled Dinga Bhase Dakshin Samudrey.

He received several awards including, Chittagong City Corporation Literary Award for contributing in Bengali essay, honoured by Chittagong City Corporation in 2016. He also awarded Kolkata Little Magazine Library Award by Kolkata Little Magazine Library And Research Center for editing his magazine Pushpakroth.

== Biography ==
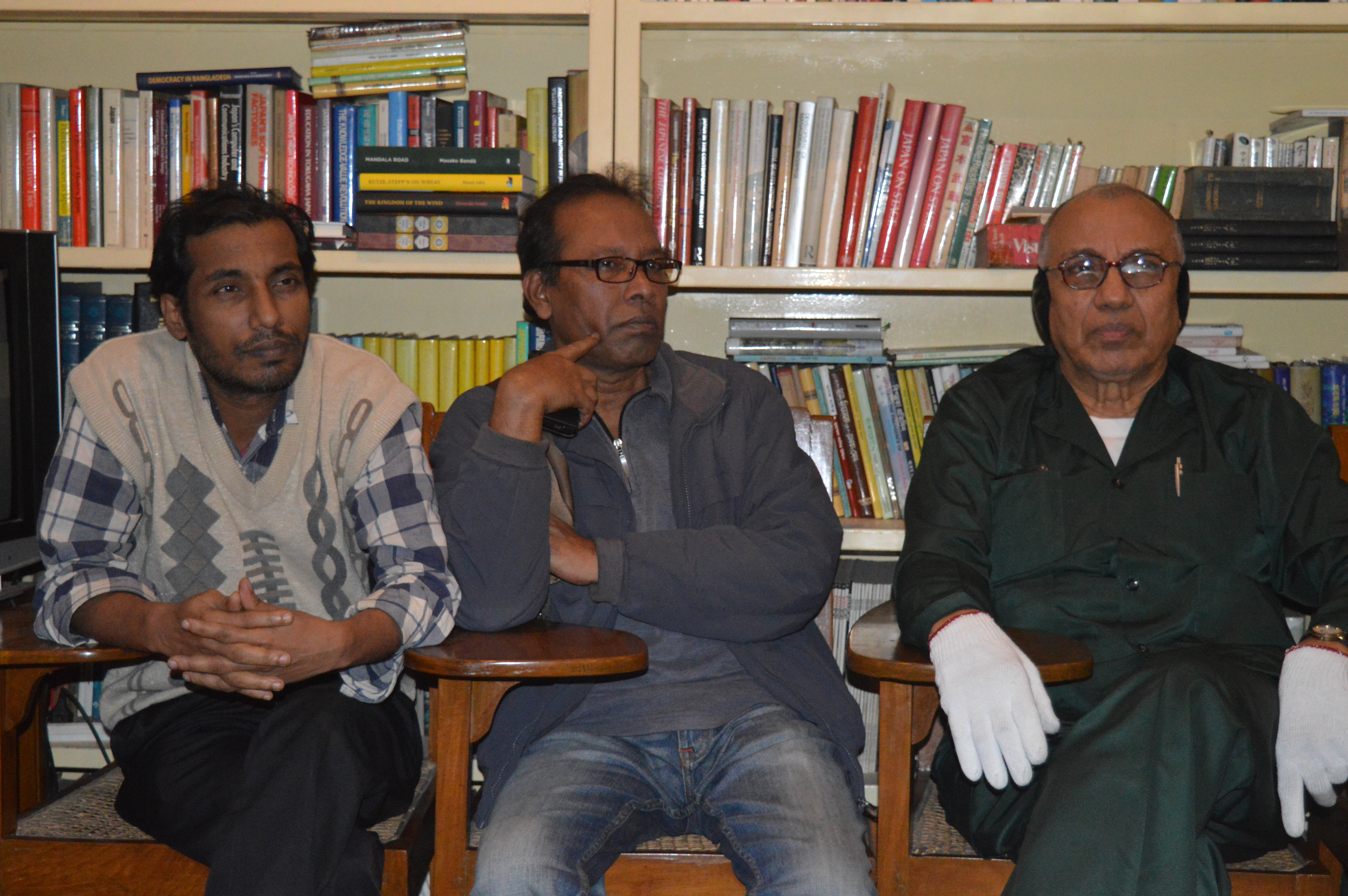
Hafiz (center) with poet and philosopher Shobuj Taposh and diplomat Muhammad Nurul Islam at Bengali Wikipedia's celebration in 2016.

Hafiz Rashid Khan was born on June 23, 1961 in Banshkhali, Chittagong, East Pakistan (now Bangladesh). His father was a government employee. He grew up at Sulakbahar area. Hafiz earned a bachelor degree from the University of Chittagong. He currently served as a journalist at the daily newspaper Suprobhat Bangladesh in Chattogram.

== Literary works ==
In 1982, Hafiz was published his first poetry Jostna Kemon Phutechhe. He works with several literary magazines during his early writings career. Renaissance, Dhaner Sheeshe Gaan, Brishti, Samujjal Sabatash since 1991, and Pushpakroth since 1993.

== Personal life ==
Hafiz married Milattunnesa Khanom in 1995. They have two daughters Naisa Hafiz Khan Oichchhik and Raisa Hafiz Khan Oihik.

== Bibliography ==
=== Poetry ===
Title	Original title (Bengali)	Year	Publication	Ref.
Jostna Kemon Phutechhe	Bengali: জোসনা কেমন ফুটেছে	1982		
Choragopta Dubopahar	Bengali: চোরাগোপ্তা ডুবোপাহাড়	1988		
Lohito Mandolin	Bengali: লোহিত ম্যান্ডোলিন	1991		
Swapnakhander Rokeya Begam Ruku	Bengali: স্বপ্নখন্ডের রোকেয়া বেগম রুকু	1995		
Adivasi Kabya	Bengali: আদিবাসী কাব্য	1997	Pushpakaratha	OCLC 37481098
Totemer Rate Hotyakando	Bengali: টোটেমের রাতে হত্যাকান্ড	2002		
Jumpaharer Om	Bengali: জুমপাহাড়ের ওম	2002		
Ai Shundar Aamang Harabo Na	Bengali: এই সুন্দর আমাঙ হারাবো না	2006		
Adivasi Kabitasongroho	Bengali: আদিবাসী কবিতাসংগ্রহ	2010	Agamee Prakashani	ISBN 9789840413188
Ghurnir Goenda Ghera	Bengali: ঘূর্ণির গোয়েন্দা ঘেরা	2012	Adorn Publication	
Porshiwala Jagoo	Bengali: পড়শিওয়ালা জাগো	2013	Shudhwswar	
Roder Poster	Bengali: রোদের পোস্টার	2014	Prottayalir	
Lord Clive'er Pothikera	Bengali: লর্ড ক্লাইভের পথিকেরা	2015		
Kobitar Karabas Kobitar Mukti	Bengali: কবিতার কারাবাস কবিতার মুক্তি	2015	Aditya Anik Publication	
Pratnajibaner Ratno	Bengali: প্রত্নজীবনের রত্ন	2017	Aditya Anik Publication	ISBN 9789849299769
Dinga Bhase Dakshin Samudrey	Bengali: ডিঙা ভাসে দক্ষিণ সমুদ্রে	2018		

=== Others poetry ===
- Phulbariar Nihoto Polashguli (1984)
- Sundirer Durgo (1984)
- Shreshtho Kobita (2019)

=== Criticism ===
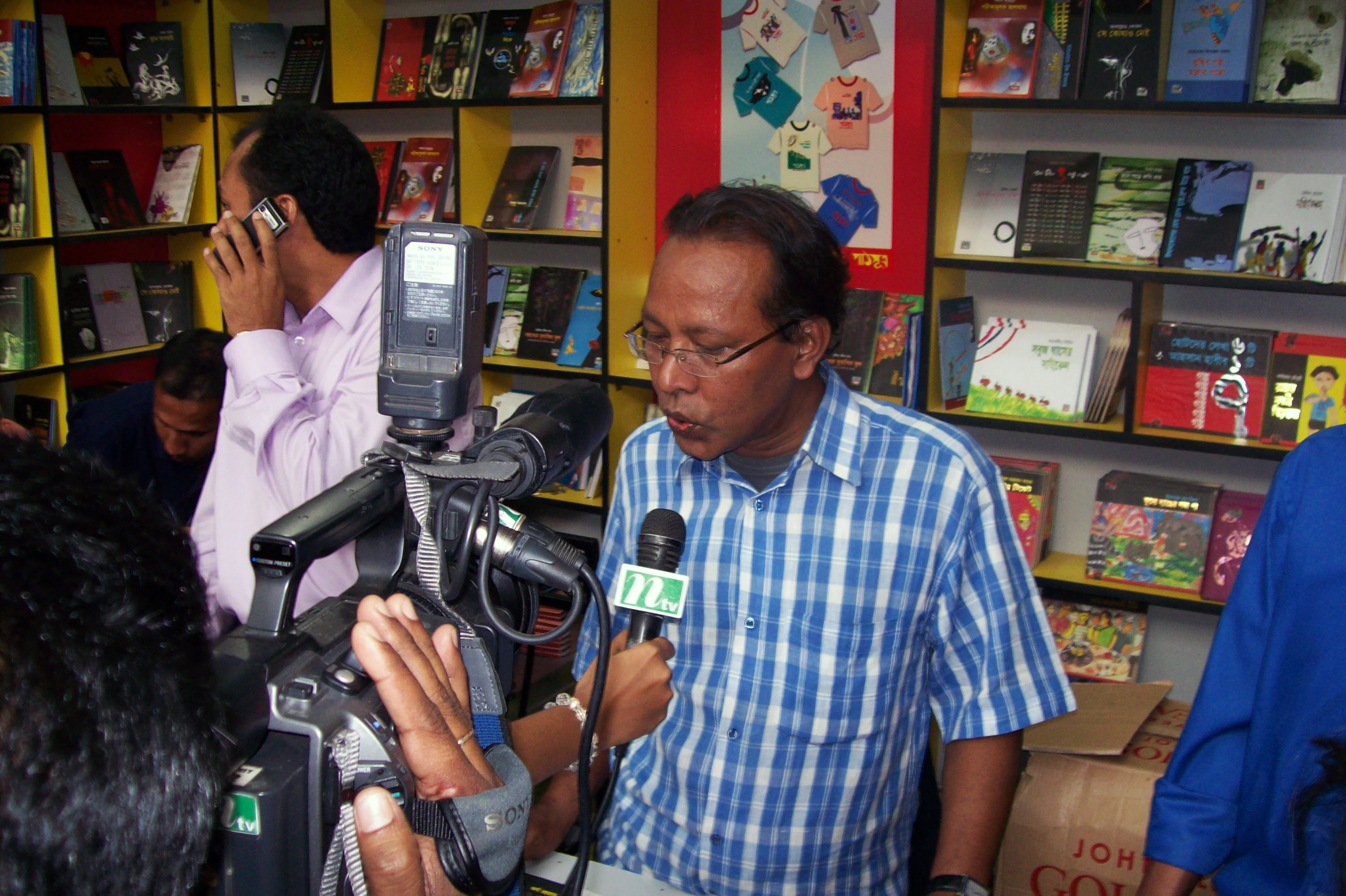
Hafiz during an interview at Ekushey Book Fair in 2009

Year	Title	Title original	Publication	Ref.
1993	Baangladesher Upajati O Adibaasi : Angshidaritver Natuna Diganta	Bengali: বাংলাদেশের উপজাতি ও আদিবাসী : অংশিদারিত্বের নতুন দিগন্ত		Editor
2001	Amader Kabita O Adibasi Prasaṅga	Bengali: আমাদের কবিতা ও আদিবাসী প্রসঙ্গ		
2004	Adivasi Probondho	Bengali: আদিবাসী প্রবন্ধ		
2005	Nirbachito Adivasi Gadya	Bengali: নির্বাচিত আদিবাসী গদ্য	Adorn Publication	ISBN 9789842000126
2009	Aronner Subasito Phul	Bengali: অরণ্যের সুবাসিত ফুল	Pathsutra	
2009	Adibasi Jibon Adibasi Sonskriti	Bengali: আদিবাসী জীবন আদিবাসী সংস্কৃতি	Adorn Publication	
2016	Alos Korotali	Bengali: অলস করতালি		
2016	Uzani Chara Lamoni Dhar	Bengali: উজানি ছড়া লামনি ধার		
2016	Kabitar Karabas Kabitar Mukti	Bengali: কবিতার কারাবাস কবিতার মুক্তি	Aditya Anik Publication	ISBN 9789849241430

== Teenage literature ==
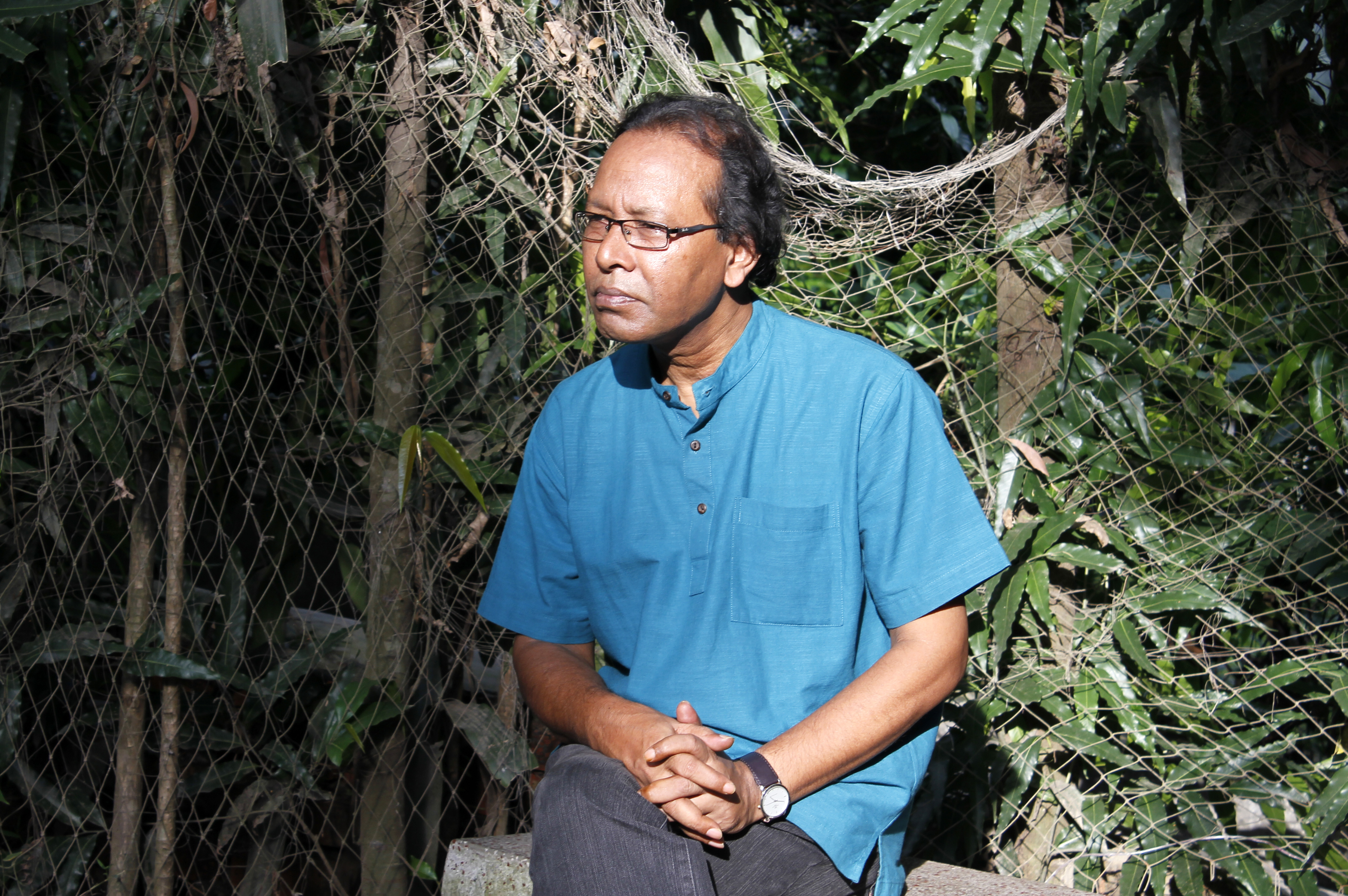
Hafiz at Chittagong DC Hill in 2013

Year	Title	Title original	Publication	Ref.
2018	Otto Hasir Golpo	Bengali: অট্ট হাসির গল্প	Aditya Anik Publication	ISBN 9789849322610

=== Editorial ===
- Renaissance
- Dhaner Sheeshe Gaan
- Brishti
- Samujjal Sabatash (first edition in 1991)
- Pushpakroth (first edition in 1993)

== Awards and honors ==
Year	Awards	Category	Provider	Note
-	Kolkata Little Magazine Library Award	for Pushpakroth	Kolkata Little Magazine Library And Research Center	
-	Special Honor	for Pushpakroth	Chinho Foundation	
2016	Chattogram City Corporation Literary Award	essay	Chittagong City Corporation	
2016	Special Honor	poetry	Lekhomala	

== See also ==
- List of Bangladeshi poets

== Sources ==
- Reeyad, Moheen; Russell, Rafaell (2013). মস্তিস্কই তো নুতন-নতুনতর পথের সৃষ্টিকর্তা [An Interview with Hafiz Rashid Khan: The brain is the creator of the new path]. Cherageeadda (Interview) (in Bengali). Chittagong: Prottayalir. Archived from the original on 2020-06-21.
