= Netrakona Government College =

- নেত্রকোণা সরকারি কলেজ
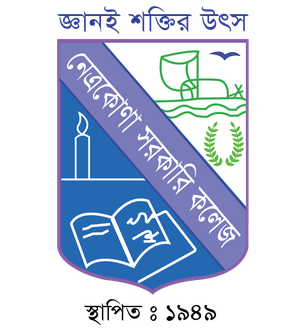
- Motto: জ্ঞানই শক্তির উৎস (Knowledge is the source of power)
- Type: Public college
- Established: 1949
- Affiliations: National University and Mymensingh Education Board
- Principal: Abu Taher Khan
- Administrative staff: Mohammad Abu Taher (Vice Principal)
- Location: Netrokona Sadar, Netrokona, Bangladesh; 24.8872°N 90.7218°E
- Campus: Public
- Website: ngc.ac.bd

Netrakona Government College (also known as Netrakona College) is a public college in Netrokona District, Bangladesh.

== History ==
Surrounded by greenery in the land of Mahua and Malua, Netrakona Government College is the prominent higher education institution in Netrokona District. Although modern education began in this district before the partition of India, no college was established here during British rule. As a result, while many talented students graduated from the existing schools every year, only the children of wealthy families had the opportunity to travel to Mymensingh, Dhaka, or Kolkata for higher education. This deprived numerous talented but underprivileged students of opportunities.

Under these circumstances, local political and social leaders felt the necessity of establishing a college. After the partition, Gias Uddin Ahmed (CSP), the Sub-Divisional Officer (SDO) of Netrokona, took the initiative to establish a college with the sincere efforts of Achan Ali MLA, Akbar Ali MLA, A. K. Fazlul Huq, Prafulla Chowdhury, Dr. Samir Uddin, and Birendra Dutt Chowdhury (Sandesh Babu). At the very first meeting of the founders, Birendra Dutt Chowdhury, the then Zamindar of Rouha, donated the land at Satpai where the college is currently located. Later, as construction began on its own land, several other benefactors donated land for the college. In addition, people from all walks of life, including local farmers and businessmen, came forward to help with the construction. SDO Gias Uddin Ahmed provided full government support. Subsequently, when Khan Alam Khan joined as SDO, his tireless efforts led to the progressive development of the college.

According to the decision taken at the founders' first meeting in 1949, student enrollment began that same year. It was named Netrakona College. Priyo Bhusan Banik assumed the role of the college's first Principal. The administrative activities of the new college were initially conducted from the student hostel of Dutt High School. Classes were held at the local Anjuman High School and the U.C. Public Hall. Later, in 1954, the college was relocated to its own building at the present site. Netrakona College began its journey with a principal, 7 teachers, 1 clerk, 3 peons, and a small number of students.

Until 1960, the college only offered Humanities and Commerce tracks at the intermediate level. The Science branch was opened in the 1960–61 academic year. In late 1963, the institution was upgraded to a degree college. The B.Com program was introduced in 1965, followed by the B.Sc. program in 1968. The college was nationalized in 1980 and renamed Netrakona Government College.

== Establishment and growth ==
After nationalization, Tofazzal Hossain (T. Ahmed) became the first principal of the government college. Honours courses in Bengali and Political Science were introduced in the 1993–94 academic session, and Masters courses followed in 1994–95. Principals Prof. Md. Atahar Ali Dewan, Prof. Mojibur Rahman, and Prof. Jitendra Lal Barua played monumental roles in introducing these higher degree programs.

Currently, the college offers Honours courses in 10 subjects and Masters courses in 9. The institution operates with approximately 8,000 students and 69 teaching staff positions. The students and teachers at this college have regularly played a role in democratic movements and struggles, including the War of Independence. The college was founded through the collective efforts of education enthusiasts from various classes and professions.

== Faculties and departments ==
Degree (Pass)

- B.A.
- B.S.S.
- B.Sc.
- B.B.S.

Bachelor (Honours)

- Bengali
- English
- History
- Islamic History
- Philosophy
- Social Science
- Economics
- Accounting
- Management
- Chemistry
- Biology
- Botany
- Zoology
- Mathematics

Master's

- Bengali
- History
- Islamic History
- Philosophy
- Political Science
- Economics
- Accounting
- Management
- Chemistry
- Botany
- Zoology
- Mathematics

== Achievements ==
Every year, students successfully pass the HSC examination from this college and secure admissions into medical colleges, engineering universities, and other public universities. The college also maintains strong academic performance in its Honours and Masters programs.

== Future plans ==
The college plans to introduce Masters courses in 5 additional subjects and increase the number of teaching staff positions.

== Notable alumni ==
- Abdul Khalek – Awami League Member of Parliament (1970). A key organizer of the Liberation War, founding General Secretary of the Netrokona Subdivision Awami League, and the first General Secretary (GS) of Netrokona Government College.
- Ashraf Ali Khan Khasru – Politician, Member of Parliament, and former Minister of State for the Government of Bangladesh.
- Ashraf Uddin Khan – Politician and former Member of Parliament.
- Helal Hafiz – Renowned poet and winner of the Ekushey Padak.

== See also ==
- Dutt High School
- Education in Bangladesh
- National University, Bangladesh
