= List of Bangladeshi poets =

Following is a list of Bangladeshi poets, either born in Bangladesh or who published much of their writing while living in the country.

== A ==
- Ahsan Habib
- Abul Hussain
- Abu Zafar Obaidullah
- Abu Hena Mustafa Kamal
- Al Mahmud
- Abul Hasan
- Arunabh Sarkar
- Abid Azad
- Alaol
- Azizur Rahman (poet)
- Anisul Hoque
- Anwar Pasha
- Abdul Mannan Syed
- Abu Hasan Shahriar
- Abdul Hye Sikder
- Abid Anwar
- Abdul Ghani Hazari

== B ==
- Bimal Guha
- Bonde Ali Mia

== E ==
- Enamul Karim Nirjhar

== F ==
- Farrukh Ahmed
- Fazal Shahabuddin

== G ==
- Gazi Rafiq

== H ==
- Helal Hafiz
- Hasan Hafizur Rahman
- Humayun Azad

== J ==
- Jasimuddin
- Jibanananda Das

== K ==
- Kazi Nazrul Islam
- Khondakar Ashraf Hossain
- Kusumkumari Das
- Hafiz Rashid Khan
- Kaykobad

== L ==
- Lalon Shah

== M ==
- Michael Madhusudan Dutt
- Mozid Mahmud
- Motiur Rahman Mollik

== N ==
- Nirmalendu Goon

== R ==
- Rudra Mohammad Shahidullah

== S ==
- Shah Muhammad Sagir
- Shamsur Rahman
- Syed Shamsul Huq
- Shaheed Quaderi
- Sikdar Aminul Haq
- Shah Abdul Karim

== T ==
- Tuhin Das

== See also ==
- List of Bangladeshi people
