= Song of Life =

Song of Life may refer to:

== Film ==
- The Song of Life (1922 film), an American silent film
- Song of Life (Píseň života), a 1924 film starring Adolf Krössing
- The Song of Life (1926 film), a German silent film
- The Song of Life (1931 film), a German film
- Bhikharan or Song of Life, a 1935 Indian Hindi film
- The Song of Life (1945 film), an Italian film

== Literature ==
- Song of Life, a 1927 short-story collection by Fannie Hurst
- "Song of Life", a 1970 poem by Huang Xiang; see Century Mountain
- The Song of Life, a 1920 book by W. H. Davies
- The Song of Life, a 1913 short story by William J. Locke
- The Song of Life and Other Poems, a book by Vinayaka Krishna Gokak; see 1947 in poetry
- Cîntul vieții (The Song of Life), a 1950 book by Alexandru Toma
- Ernst von Dohnányi: A Song of Life, a biography of Ernst von Dohnányi by Iona von Dohnányi

== Music ==
- Levenslied (lit. "life song" or "song about life"), a Dutch-language type of popular music
- Songs of Life Festival

=== Classical music ===
- Gesang des Lebens (Song of Life), a 1914 choral composition by Joseph Marx
- Gesang des Lebens, op.29 (Song of Life), a 1910 choral composition by Richard Wetz
- Song of Life, a composition by Lora Aborn
- Song of Life, a tone poem by Frederick Grant Gleason
- Song of Life, a 2007 chamber piece for solo violin by Matthew Hindson
- The Song of Life, a 1995 cantata by Ivo Petrić

=== Albums ===
- Songs of Life (Bret Michaels album) or the title song, 2003
- Songs of Life (The Gufs album) or the title song, "Song of Life", 1992
- Song of Life, by Libera, 2012

=== Popular songs ===
- "Song of Life" (song), a 1992 song by Leftfield
- "Song of Life", from the film The Outsiders II, 2004
- "Song of Life", from the video game Project DIVA, 2009
- "The Song of Life", by Eluveitie from Spirit, 2006
- "The Song of Life (La-La-La)", by Minnie Ripperton from Love Lives Forever, 1980

== Religion ==
- Shir Hayim ("Song of Life") a Reform Jewish synagogue in London, England

== Other uses ==
- Yakuza 6: The Song of Life, a 2016 video game
