= Nishiddho Sompadokiyo =

1969 poem by Helal Hafiz

- Ekhon Joubon Jar
- by Helal Hafiz
- Original title: নিষিদ্ধ সম্পাদকীয়
- Written: c. 20 January–1 February 1969
- First published in: Little magazine (21 February 1969)
- Country: Bangladesh
- Language: Bengali
- Series: Je Jole Agun Jole
- Subject: 1969 East Pakistan mass uprising
- Genre: Prose poetry
- Publisher: Dibya Prakash
- Publication date: February 1986
- Media type: Printed page
- Lines: 18

Nishiddho Sampadokiyo (Bengali: নিষিদ্ধ সম্পাদকীয়, lit. 'Banned Editorial') is a poem written by Helal Hafiz in 1969. Set against the backdrop of the Bangladesh Liberation War, the poem primarily focuses on the 1969 East Pakistan mass uprising and calls for the movement to take up arms. Later, it was included in the poetry collection Je Jole Agun Jole, published in 1986.

When the poem was submitted for publication in the Daily Pakistan, literary editor Ahsan Habib refused to publish it, deeming it anti-state. Subsequently, Ahmed Sofa and Humayun Kabir wrote the first two lines of the poem on flyers and pasted them on the walls around the University of Dhaka. The poem was frequently recited at various political gatherings of the East Pakistan Students' League. After Bangladesh won its independence (from the Mujib era onward) leftist political parties in Bangladesh widely used the poem. It also gained significant attention during the 1990 Bangladesh mass uprising, resonating deeply with the people.

== Background ==
In January 1969, during the mass uprising in East Pakistan, poet Helal Hafiz, on his way from Old Dhaka to the University of Dhaka, witnessed members of the police and the East Pakistan Rifles suppressing protesters in Gulistan. At that time, a rickshaw puller encouraged the protesters to fight back, stating that killing for patriotism was justified. These words inspired Hafiz to write the poem, completing it by 1 February 1969. Later, along with Ahmed Sofa and Humayun Kabir, Helal Hafiz took the poem to Ahsan Habib, the literary editor of the Daily Pakistan, for publication. However, after reading the poem, the editor refused to publish it, fearing that it would be deemed anti-state and would potentially lead to the loss of his job and even the newspaper shutting down. After failing to get the poem published in the newspaper, Sofa and Kabir wrote the first two lines on flyers and pasted them on the walls of the university area. Eventually, on 21 February 1969, the poem was published in a magazine for the first time. In 1986, the poem was included in Helal Hafiz’s first published poetry collection, Je Jole Agun Jole. Later, it was translated into English, French, German and Hindi.

== Theme ==
Set against the backdrop of the Bangladesh Liberation War, the poem's central theme is the 1969 mass uprising. The poem calls for the movement to take up armed struggle. Additionally, the poem presents independence as the ultimate solution, contrasting it with the suffering depicted in the poem.

== Reception ==
According to Musarrat Naushaba, the poem is rich in political awareness, and the depth of patriotism is expressed effortlessly. She notes that the poem depicts a "timeless depiction of life" with a sense of completeness. Mustafa Haider considers the poem an enduring work that captures youth consciousness in the context of independence. According to Jubak Anarya, this poem was what brought Helal Hafiz to fame, noting "It is as if poet Helal Hafiz himself is consumed by a melancholic despair. He sees beauty in shackles and roses declared outlaws. Yet, he never turns his poetry into mere slogans." Mohammad Ali argues that in this poem, Helal Hafiz portrays a lover who sacrifices his youth for patriotism, treating the enemy of the nation as his adversary who must be killed.

== Legacy ==
During Bangladesh's pre-independence era, this poem was recited at various political gatherings of the East Pakistan Students' League. In 1971, it was used both to inspire young people to join the Bangladesh Liberation War and to boost the Muktibahini's morale. After independence, from the Mujib era onward, the country's leftist political parties widely used the poem. It remained relevant in Bangladesh's history of independence and later gained renewed attention during the 1990 Bangladesh mass uprising, when it resonated deeply with the people. The first two lines of the poem have become one of the most widely used slogans in Bangladesh's political landscape.

In 2015, under the initiative of Sabed Sathi, the poem was adapted into a song and music video featuring North America-based singer Kaushali Ima. During the 2018 Bangladesh quota reform movement, when the government accused the Bangladesh Nationalist Party and Bangladesh Jamaat-e-Islami for the involvement in the student-based movement, writer Anisul Hoque referenced this poem, urging the authorities to swiftly address the students' demands. In 2020, amidst the COVID-19 pandemic, Mashrafe Mortaza, then-captain of the Bangladesh national cricket team, imitated the poem’s first two lines to encourage people to stay home. He posted on Facebook: "এখন যৌবন যার বাসায় থাকার তার শ্রেষ্ঠ সময়..." (lit. 'Now is the best time for youth to stay at home ...').

== See also ==
- Huliya (poem) – 1970 poem by Nirmalendu Goon
