= Chittagong City Corporation Literary Award =

Chattogram City Corporation Literary Award
- Description: The award was given in recognition of outstanding contributions at the national level in various branches of Bengali literature.
- Country: Bangladesh
- Presented by: Chattogram City Corporation
- Established: 2014
- First award: 2014
- Final award: 2018

Chattogram City Corporation Literary Award is an annual literary award introduced by Chattogram City Corporation This award has been given in February every year since 2014 in recognition of outstanding contributions in various branches of Bengali literature at the national level.

== Award ==
Each recipient is awarded a standard medal and prize money.

== List of awardees by year ==
=== 2014 ===
In 2014, awards and receptions were given to 5 people for their contribution in various fields of literature.

- Swapan Dutt (Poetry)
- Ferdous Ara Alim (Fiction)
- Mahibul Aziz (Essays and Research)
- Muhammad Nasir Uddin (World Literature)
- Fahmida Amin (Children's Literature)

=== 2015 ===
In 2015, awards and receptions were given to 5 people for their contribution in various fields of literature.

- Moyukh Chowdhury (Poetry)
- Biswajit Chowdhury (Fiction)
- Moniruzzaman (Essays and Research)
- Siddique Ahmed (World Literature)
- Iqbal Babul (Children's Literature)

=== 2016 ===
Literary awards and receptions were given to 6 people for their contribution in various fields of book fair of Chittagong City Corporation at the premises of Muslim Institute Hall in Chittagong city in February 2016.

- Kamruzzaman Jahangir (posthumous)
- Fauzul Kabir (Poetry)
- Hafiz Rashid Khan (Article)
- Nur Mohammad Rafiq (Research)
- Khurshid Anwar (World Literature)
- Rashed Rouf (Children's Literature)

=== 2017 ===
Literary awards and receptions were given to 6 people for their contribution in various fields of book fair of Chittagong City Corporation at the premises of Muslim Institute Hall in Chittagong city in February 2017.

- Mohit ul Alam (fiction)
- Arun Dasgupta (poetry)
- Mahbubul Haque (essay)
- Bipul Barua (children's literature)
- Milon Chowdhury (drama)
- Avik Usman (drama)
- Mahfuzur Rahman (Liberation War research)

=== 2018 ===
In February 2017, 3 people were awarded literary prizes and receptions.

- Rafiq Anwar (Fiction, Posthumous)
- Naser Rahman (Fiction)
