= Anil Acharya =

Bengali editor

- Occupations: Essayist, writer, poet
- Known for: Editor of Anustup literary magazine

Anil Acharya (Bengali: Ônil Ācāryô) is an Indian Bengali scholar, essayist, short story writer and poet. In 1966, he founded the Bengali literary quarterly and little magazine Anustup.

== Education ==
Acharya graduated with an honors degree in English literature from the Scottish Church College. Thereafter he earned his master's degree in English literature from the University of Calcutta.

== Career ==
Acharya taught English at Serampore College, later becoming the departmental head and establishing the college's Communicative English programme. His work has included the Collection, Collation, Digitalization of Texts and other Lingual Matter in the Corpora for the Bengali Language for The Secretary General Literature Arts National Culture & Educational Research Society, Kolkata.

He is a member of the Publisher and Bookseller's Guild, the organisers of the Kolkata Book Fair, which is Asia's largest book fair and the most attended book fair in the world. He was elected Secretary of the Guild for three successive terms, between 1996 and 1998, and during his tenure, the noted French Philosopher Jacques Derrida inaugurated the Kolkata Book Fair in 1997.

Since 1986, he was written and edited the quarterly journal, Anustup, and has also founded an English language literary periodical for translated short stories from Bengali, called Harvest. In 1970, he assisted the Australian director Paul Cox as the assistant director in making the documentary on Calcutta. He was also the associate producer of Paul Cox's film "Force of Destiny" released in 2014. He is currently associated with St. Thomas' College of Engineering and Technology, Kolkata.

Between February 2013 and February 2015, he wrote a regular Sunday column in the Bengali newspaper 'Ei Somoy', called "Nipaatone Siddho". It documented the myriad experiences that played out across four decades in the Bengali cultural and political landscape, and shaped Anustup and what it stands for. He is also the author of the Bengali book titled "Parasmaipadi" which is a collection of his selected articles.

== Recognition ==
In 2012, he was appointed as a Tagore National Scholar by the Ministry of Culture of the Government of India.

== See also ==
- Little magazine movement
- Kolkata Little Magazine Library And Research Center
