= Non-Government Teachers' Registration and Certification Authority =

Government agency of Bangladesh

- Formation: 2005
- Headquarters: Dhaka, Bangladesh
- Region served: Bangladesh
- Official language: Bengali
- Website: Non-Government Teachers' Registration and Certification Authority

Non-Government Teachers' Registration and Certification Authority (বেসরকারি শিক্ষক নিবন্ধন ও প্রত্যয়ন কর্তৃপক্ষ) is a Bangladesh government regulatory agency under the Ministry of Education responsible for the registration and certification of teachers in private educational institutes under the government monthly pay order (MPO).

== History ==
Non-Government Teachers' Registration and Certification Authority was established in 2005 by the Government of Bangladesh. It holds annual Teachers Registration Examinations in Bangladesh. In 2017, 527,757 candidates took the examination and 147,262 of them passed. The authority has published 17th NTRCA syllabus.
