= Khet Mar =

Khet Mar (Burmese: ခက်မာ) is a Burmese journalist, activist, writer, poet and essayist.

== Biography ==
Khet Mar was born in 1969 in Myanmar. When she was 22 years old, Khet Mar was sentenced to spend 10 years behind the bars because of her activist actions. Her writings on topics such as human rights and politics were banned in Burma.

== Cyclone Nargis ==
When Cyclone Nargis hit her country on May 3, 2008, there were a lot of casualties. It left 130,000 dead and Khet Mar began helping the victims of the disaster and was almost imprisoned again for her humane help. As a volunteer teacher and organizer for a number of orphanage schools, Mar was doing things that her fellow citizens did not approve of.

== Exile ==
In 2009, after the close imprisonment encounter, she, her husband, and their two sons came to Pittsburgh to become a part of the City of Asylum/Pittsburgh as a Writer-In-Residence. The campaign's purpose is to offer safe living places to international artists whose works have been banned in their home-countries, which forced them to become refugees. She is currently a columnist for Sampsonia Way Magazine, where she writes about "Burmese writers, literary trends, and politics."

Her work has been translated into English and Japanese, been broadcast on radio, and made into a film.

== Famous works ==
- The novel Wild Snowy Night has been translated in English and Japanese and has also been made into a film.
- The essay Night Flow which described the poverty in the village Khet Mar grew up- Maletto.
- The storyMidnight Callers which recalls Khet Mar's experiences being arrested and maltreated.
- Khet Mar has also published several collections of short stories, essays and poems.
