= Tuhin Das (writer) =

Bengali activist and writer

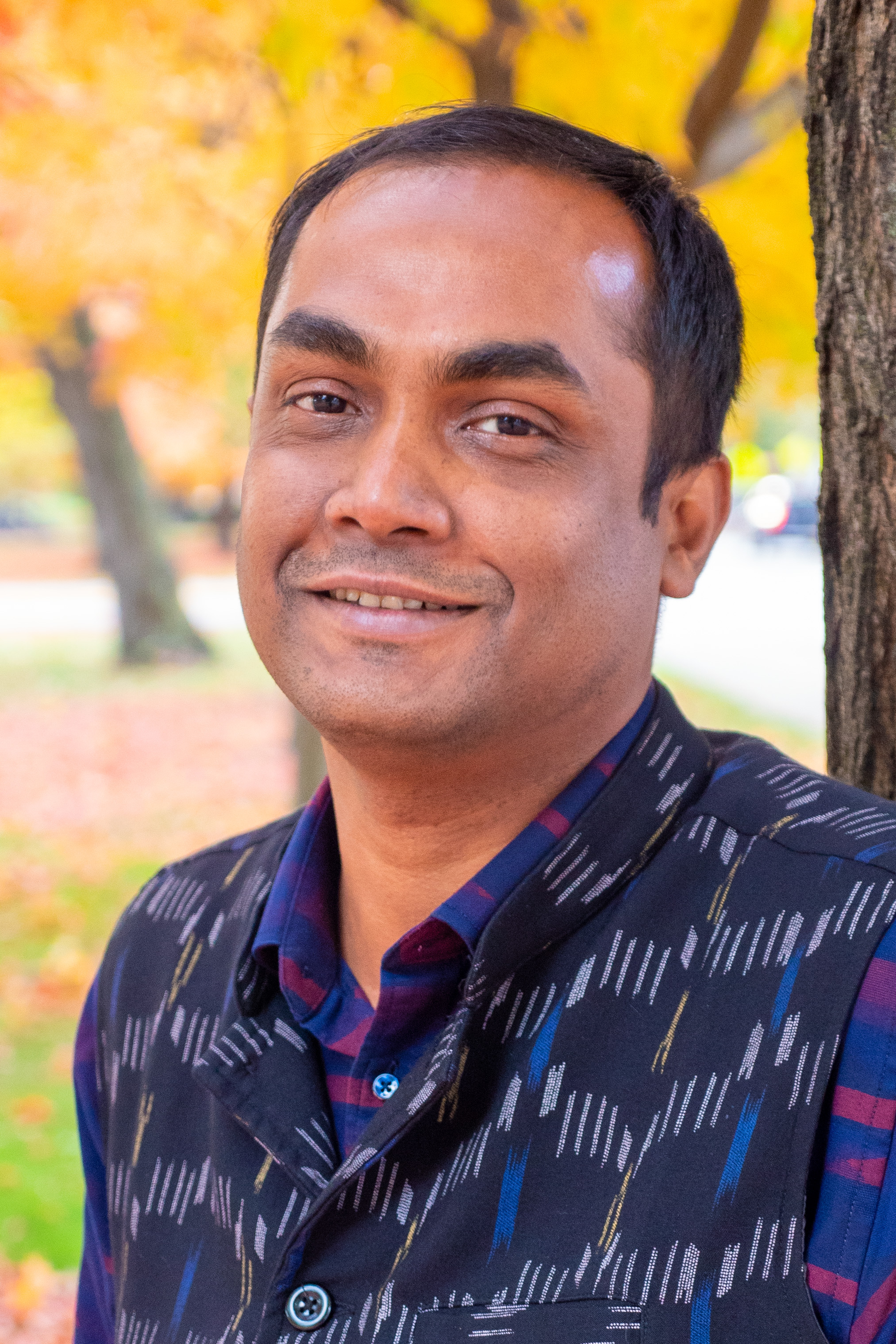
- Das in 2022
- Born: 1985 (age 40–41); Barisal, Bangladesh
- Occupations: Activist, poet, writer
- Writing career
- Language: Bengali, English
- Years active: 2000–present
- Genres: essay, poetry

Tuhin Das is a Bengali activist and writer living in exile. Das is best known for his Bengali poetry and political essays. His first English book Exile Poems focuses on his life as an exiled writer.

After extremist threats, Tuhin Das fled to America for political asylum in 2016. He became a writer-in-residence at City of Asylum in Pittsburgh, Pennsylvania which offers sanctuary for persecuted writers. In 2021, his house became a public art installation called Comma House featuring his Bengali poems.

== About ==
Tuhin Das was born in Barisal. He lived there with his family. Das started writing poems in the seventh grade. Das was fascinated with the formation of his home country from an early age. He would establish and run his own publishing company which covered political issues. Das went into hiding after Al Qaeda-linked groups threatened him.

In 2016 Das became a visiting scholar at Carnegie Mellon University. He found a long-term home in Pittsburgh becoming the writer-in-residence at City of Asylum.

== Activism ==
Tuhin Das writes political essays. His essays contained criticism of Muslim treatment of Hindu and other religious minorities in Bangladesh. He organized protests and urged the government to establish tribunals for war crimes that occurred during Bangladesh Liberation War.

== Publications ==
Tuhin is the author of eight poetry books in Bengali. His books has received generally positive reviews.

- Exile Poems: In the Labyrinth of Homesickness. Translated by Arunava Sinha. Bridge and Tunnel Books, 2022. ISBN 978-1946645043

== See also ==
- City of Asylum
- List of Bangladeshi poets
