= Huang Xiang =

Chinese poet and calligrapher

Huang Xiang 黃翔
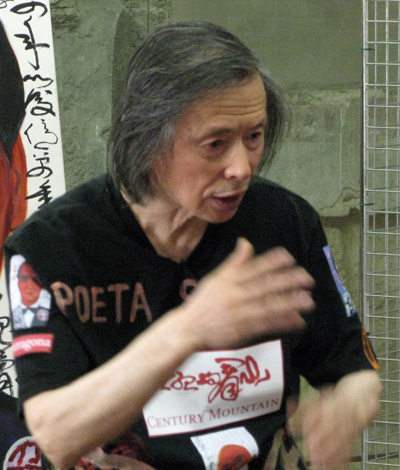
- Huang Xiang being interviewed in Tarragona, Spain with Century Mountain portrait of Gandhi. June 2010.
- Born: December 26, 1941 (age 84); Guidong County, Hunan Province
- Occupation: Poet
- Relatives: Huang Xiangming
- Writing career
- Subjects: Politics, philosophy, the beauty of the rural provinces, spiritual life, and his beloved literary ancestors

Chinese name
- Traditional Chinese: 黃翔
- Simplified Chinese: 黃翔
Transcriptions
Standard Mandarin
- Hanyu Pinyin: Huáng Xiáng
- Wade–Giles: Huang^{1} Hsiang^{1}

Huang Xiang (Chinese: 黃翔; born on December 26, 1941) is a 20th-century Chinese poet and calligrapher who came to prominence following China's Cultural Revolution. Huang worked as an industrial worker in 1952 when he came to Guiyang and is also one of the representatives of Guizhou poets.

== Early life ==
Huang Xiang was born in Guidong County of Hunan Province during a fire, during which he and his mother had to be carried to a nearby temple for safety. At a young age, Huang began to write poetry on topics such as “politics, philosophy, the beauty of the rural provinces, spiritual life, and beloved literary ancestors.”

Huang lived through communist leader Mao Zedong's Cultural Revolution and the Chinese Communist Party's resultant takeover of the country. Huang's father, Huang Xiangming, was a General in the Chinese Nationalist Party, the KMT (Kuomintang), and was executed by the Communists near Manchuria in 1951. Huang Xiang, having been born as the son of a KMT official and the grandson of landowners, looked suspicious to communists, providing reasons for the communists to discriminate against him.

In grade school, Huang was denied access to extra-curricular activities and made to clean the toilets. He was not permitted to matriculate into middle school, due to his identity as a son of someone who worked for KMT. The denial of a public education negatively affected Huang, as he had a strong desire to continue his education. However, when he was ten years old, he later discovered a concealed attic at his grandparents' home, containing college books that his father had left for him years earlier. These books included the literary classics of famous writers like Lao Tzu, as well as Chinese translations of major western authors, poets and statesman such as written works by Abraham Lincoln. Between 1959 and 1995 Huang Xiang was imprisoned six times, spending a total of twelve years in Chinese prisons and labor camps due to the contents of his poetry as well as his advocacy for human rights and the fight for democracy.

== Career ==
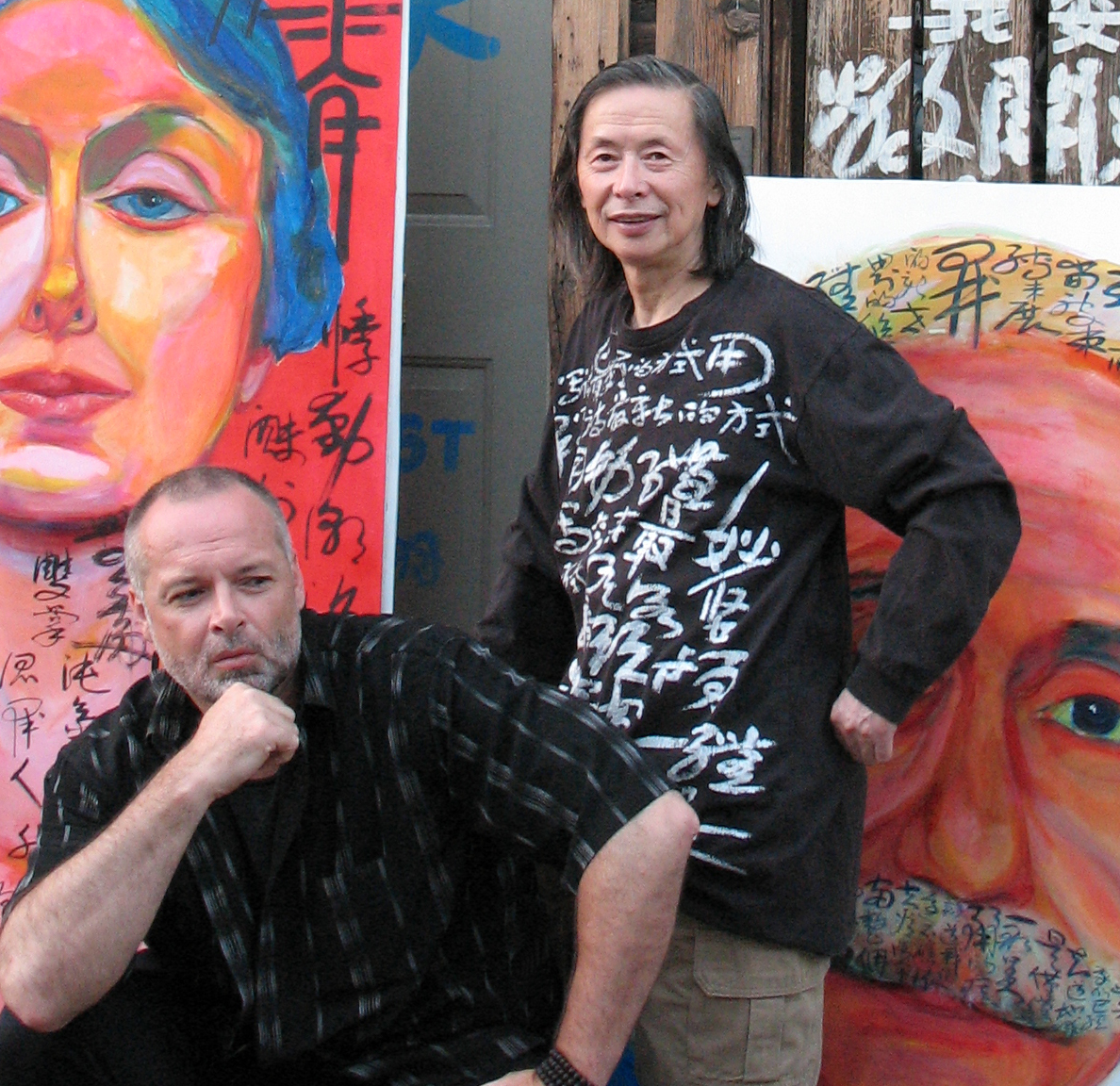
Huang Xiang (r) with William Rock and their collaborative Century Mountain Project paintings of Isadora Duncan and Albert Einstein.

=== The Democracy Wall ===
On the 24th of November 1978, Huang Xiang and cohorts posted character posters of poems on seventy yards of fence near Mao Zedong's mausoleum in Tiananmen Square condemning the Cultural Revolution and Mao himself. Huang then announced the foundation of The Enlightenment Society, whose purpose it would be to advocate freedoms enshrined in the country's constitution. This was the first non-government and non-party, civil association to be created in China since 1949.

Also in 1978, Huang Xiang participated in the Democracy Wall, an event where the Chinese public protested against political and social issues in China.

On January 1, 1979, Huang Xiang displayed on that wall an open letter to the then-President of the United States, Jimmy Carter, calling on him to put the issue of human rights in China on the international political agenda.

In March 1979, Deng Xiaoping and the Chinese Communist Party cracked down on those who had been leading the demand for Democracy in China. Huang Xiang was arrested and sentenced to a further period of "reform through labor". Later in the year, Huang Xiang was then summoned to Beijing by the Secretary-General of the Communist Party to endorse the policies of Deng Xiaoping in front of the international press corps, which he refused. He was subsequently returned to prison until the following year, and the Central Committee banned publication of Huang's works.

In 1995 the Writers Publishing House in Beijing signed a contract to publish a series of Huang's works.” However, after the scheduled release of this first edition, Huang's writing was still banned in China. Due to continued persecution, Huang Xiang and his wife, Zhang Ling, were forced to leave China and were eventually granted asylum in the United States. Huang's immigration process was featured in the documentary, Well-Founded Fear.

Despite his continued opposition to the Chinese Communist Party and his several terms in prison at the hands of the Chinese Government, Huang's poetry nonetheless reflects a hopeful view of China.

In October 2004 Huang Xiang was asked to be a guest writer in Pittsburgh for the North American Network of Cities of Asylum.

=== City of Asylum ===
Huang Xiang was the first guest writer during the summer of 2004, at the City of Asylum, a program located on the North Side of Pittsburgh, Pennsylvania. The City of Asylum "provides sanctuary to writers exiled under threat of death, imprisonment, or persecution in their native countries." Shortly after joining the project, Huang Xiang covered the outside of the house with calligraphy and poetry. Today it is one of the most visited landmarks in Pittsburgh. After completing residency with the City of Asylum, Huang Xiang moved to New York City with his wife Zhang Ling. In 2008, Huang returned to China to visit friends and family.

=== The Century Mountain Project ===
Today Huang Xiang's mission is to use art to build a bridge between East and West and to honor a universal humanity. Huang's artistic collaboration with American artist William Rock is called The Century Mountain Project. The large scale paintings featuring Huang Xiang's calligraphic poetry and William Rock's painted portraits depict great figures of humanity who have stood out like mountains throughout the centuries. As of 2012, over ninety of these portraits featuring subjects such as Walt Whitman, Emily Dickinson, Vincent van Gogh, Martin Luther King Jr. and Mahatma Gandhi have been completed. Huang Xiang and William Rock's collaborative art has received international attention. In 2010, the City of Tarragona, Spain held a major exhibition of The Century Mountain paintings at The Antiga Audiencia. The Century Mountain Project "creates a visual dialogue across humanity."
