= Humayun Kabir (poet) =

Bangladeshi poet

- হুমায়ুন কবির
- Born: 25 December 1948
- Died: 6 June 1972 (aged 23); Dhaka
- Education: University of Dhaka
- Occupation: Professor
- Known for: Poems, Articles
- Notable work: Kusumit Ispat (1972)
- Political party: Proletarian Party of East Bengal

Humayun Kabir (25 December 1948 – 6 June 1972) was a progressive poet of the Bengali language in the 20th century. He was involved in leftist politics and was a teacher in the Department of Bengali at the University of Dhaka. In 1972, he was killed due to internal conflicts within the Proletarian Party of East Bengal.

== Life and education ==
Kabir passed the Matriculation examination from Brojomohun College in 1963 and the Intermediate (I.A.) examination from the same college in 1965. In 1968, he completed his Honors degree in Bengali from the University of Dhaka, followed by a master's degree in Bengali from the same university in 1969. In 1970, he received a research fellowship from the Bangla Academy. His research at Bangla Academy focused on contemporary life consciousness and the poetry of Jibanananda Das.

== Career ==
In 1972, Kabir joined the Department of Bengali at the University of Dhaka as a lecturer. Numerous essays written by him were published in various newspapers and journals. In early 1972, he became involved in secret revolutionary political activities and established connections with leftist progressive organizations. That same year, he came under government scrutiny due to his clandestine political activities and was subsequently arrested.

He played an active role in the formation of the Purba Banglar Sarbahara Party. In 1971, he was instrumental in founding the Lekhok Sangram Shibir (Writers’ Struggle Camp), which was later renamed Bangladesh Lekhok Shibir in 1972. However, ideological and strategic differences arose between him and the party's chief leader, Siraj Sikder, regarding the implementation and execution of the party's programs.

== Assassination ==
On 6 June 1972, Humayun Kabir was assassinated in Dhaka by an armed assailant. The then-central committee of the Purba Banglar Sarbahara Party identified him as an active, close associate and a traitor of the Selim Shahnewaz Fazlu and Sultan faction. At around 9 PM on June 6, he was called out from his residence on Indira Road in Dhaka and shot dead. The guerrillas involved in his execution were later congratulated by the central committee.

Selim Shahnewaz Fazlu was married to Humayun Kabir's sister. Despite this familial relationship, Humayun Kabir faced accusations within the party, particularly regarding his refusal to accept the expulsion of his brother, Firoz Kabir. Firoz Kabir had previously been expelled from the party on charges of murdering a fellow "comrade."

The party justified his assassination by stating that "being fully influenced by a bourgeois perspective in his pursuit of literary recognition, Humayun Kabir naturally prioritized personal interests." However, in hindsight, the party later admitted that his execution was a mistake.

== Books and legacy ==
During the final moments before Bangladesh Liberation War, alongside the general populace, progressive writers also took to the streets, leaving behind their pens. Out of this revolutionary spirit, a group of young writers formed the Bangladesh Lekhak Shibir (Writers’ Struggle Camp). After Bangladesh achieved geographic independence, these young writers formally established the Bangladesh Lekhok Shibir (Bangladesh Writers’ Camp), initially emerging as a movement.

At this stage, Humayun Kabir and poet Muhammad Nurul Huda served as conveners of the organization. Among the prominent young activists of Bangladesh Lekhok Shibir at the time were Ahmed Sofa, Farhad Mazhar, Rafiq Kaiser, Muntasir Mamun, Helal Hafiz, and Rafiq Naushad. While serving as one of the conveners of the organization, Humayun Kabir was assassinated by an unknown assailant on 6 June 1972, at his rented residence on Indira Road in Dhaka.

=== Literary contributions ===
During his lifetime, Humayun Kabir did not publish any books. However, in the months leading up to his death, he actively pursued the idea of publishing a collection of his poems. With the help of his close friend Ahmed Sofa, he managed to find a publisher for his first poetry book. Finding a publisher was a challenge, so he decided to include as many poems as possible in the first manuscript. The result was Kusumita Ispat, a collection of 74 poems. Just as the book was fully typeset at the printing press, Humayun Kabir died, never getting to see the first printed copy.

The Bangla Academy later compiled his works in Humayun Kabir Rochonaboli, which includes another poetry collection, Rokter Rin. This manuscript was not prepared by Humayun himself but was compiled posthumously by Ali Monowar, Sultana Rebu, and Muhammad Nurul Huda at the request of a well-known publishing house in Dhaka. This collection primarily focuses on poems about mass awakening. Other poems that did not make it into Rokter Rin were included under the section Agronthito Kobita (Unpublished Poems) in the same compilation.

Poet Muhammad Nurul Huda noted that in terms of poetic construction—particularly in the use of metaphors, similes, and wordplay—Humayun Kabir remained deeply influenced by the literary style of Jibanananda Das. Beyond poetry, he also wrote essays and short stories. His essays, especially those on Jibanananda Das, literature, society, and the Language Movement, were sharp and insightful. His prose style followed the experimental trends set by the Kanthoshor magazine movement of the 1960s.

Humayun Kabir wrote short stories more out of whim than literary ambition. The primary inspiration for his fiction came from Suchipatra, a short story magazine edited by Rafiq Naushad in the early 1970s. His stories were often poetic, concise, and symbolic.

=== Posthumous recognition ===
Poet Muhammad Nurul Huda remarked that Humayun Kabir was fortunate to have a devoted circle of friends, which became evident after his death. Many young poets wrote poems in his memory. Farhad Mazhar penned the well-known poem Ami Deke Bolte Partum Humayun (I Could Have Called Out to You, Humayun). Expressing his immediate reaction to Kabir's death, Muhammad Nurul Huda wrote in the August 1972 issue of the poetry magazine Kalpurush, edited by Rafiq Naushad: "He was another Lorca, a Bengali Lorca—bloodied in life, death, and poetry."

== Personal life and family ==
Humayun's wife was his classmate, Sultana Rebu. At the time of his death, he was the father of one son Aditya Kabir and one daughter Aditi Kabir. Sometime after his death, his second son, Anindya Kabir, was born.
