= City of Asylum =

Nonprofit organization based in Pittsburgh, Pennsylvania, United States

- City of Asylum's logo.

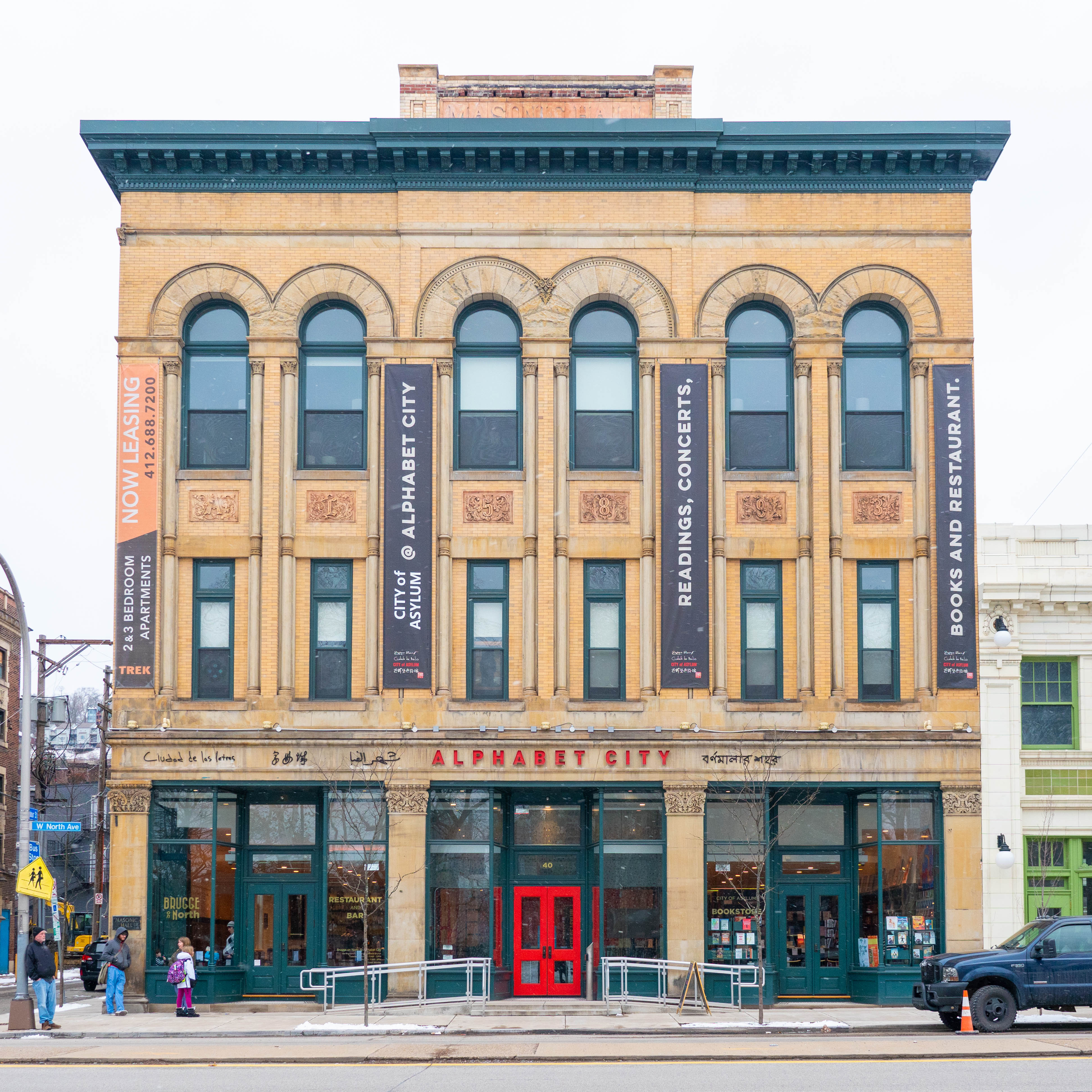
- Alphabet City - City of Asylum's headquarters
- Formation: 2004
- Founders: R. Henry Reese, Diane Samuels
- Type: Non-profit
- Purpose: To provide sanctuary to endangered literary writers.
- Headquarters: 40 W. North Ave; Pittsburgh, Pennsylvania
- Coordinates: 40.45562°N 80.007519°W
- Executive Director: Andrés Franco
- Budget: $1,100,000
- Staff: 14
- Website: cityofasylum.org

City of Asylum (more formally City of Asylum/Pittsburgh) is a nonprofit organization based in Pittsburgh, Pennsylvania, that helps writers exiled from their countries for their controversial writing.

Exiled writers accepted to the organization's program receive two years of financial and medical support for their families and up to four years of free housing. The aid is intended to provide the writers time and means to seek resettlement and adjust to life in the United States.

Founded in 2004 by Henry Reese and Diane Samuels, the organization runs the Alphabet City venue, Sampsonia Way magazine, and Pittsburgh's Jazz Poetry Month. City of Asylum hosts more than 175 cultural and literary events every year which are free to the public.

In 2016, it became the U.S. headquarters for the International Cities of Refuge Network (ICORN), which called the organization a “model for the world.” In 2017, the organization converted an old Masonic lodge into their main headquarters, called Alphabet City.

== History ==
=== Origin and establishment ===
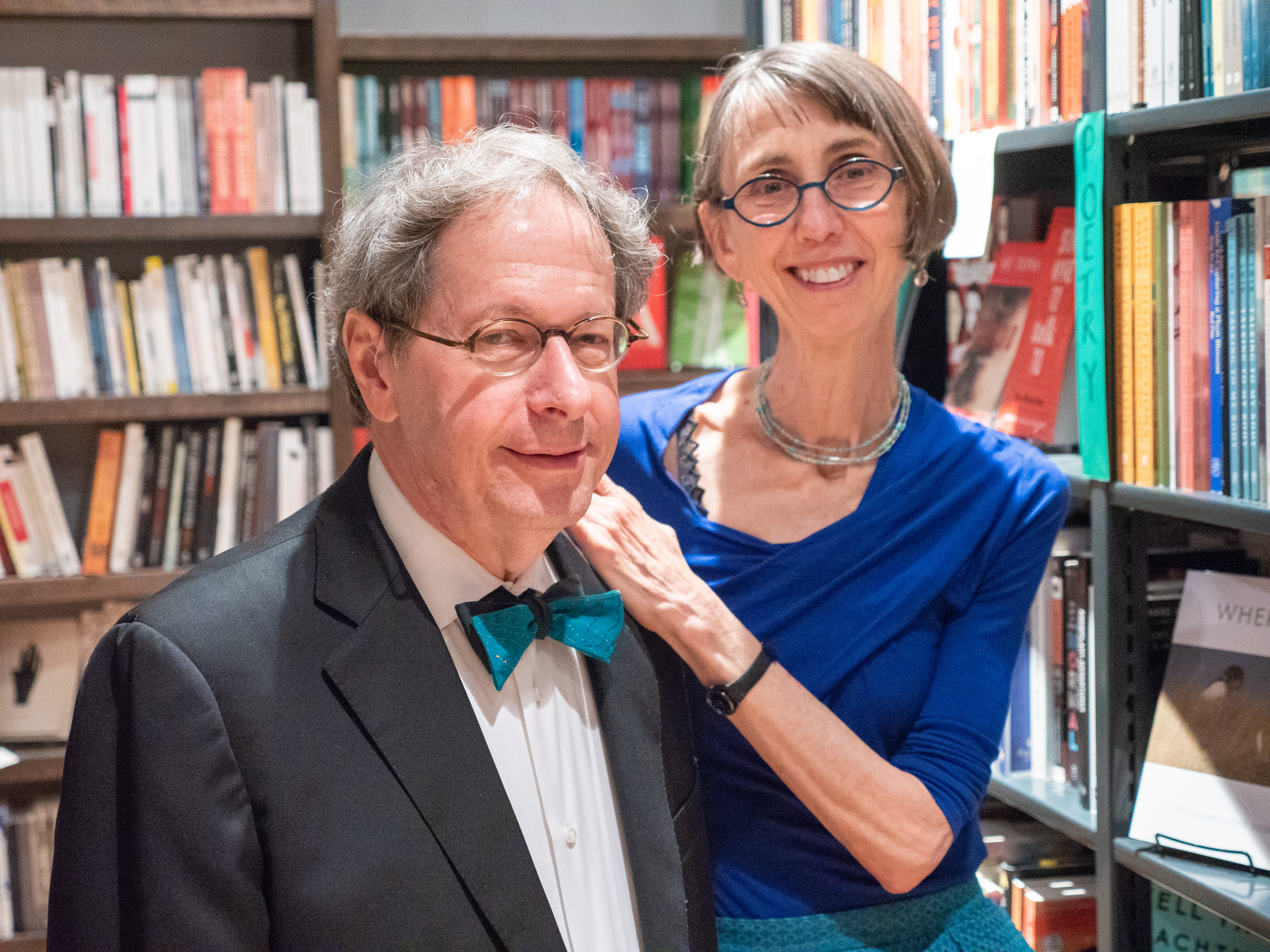
Henry Reese and Diane Samuels, founders of City of Asylum

After Pittsburgh couple Henry Reese and Diane Samuels heard Salman Rushdie mention the more-than-50-city International Cities of Refuge Networking in Europe, they sought and received approval to create a new node in their own city. The couple bought a former drug house on Sampsonia Way in Pittsburgh's North Side. They joined the nearby Mattress Factory and Randyland to fight post-industrial blight in the Mexican War Streets area.

The organization was originally funded by donations from friends, an outlier among asylum programs which are typically under universities and other institutions. The original money raised was spent to provide housing, medical benefits, and a living stipend for a writer.

The organization's first author resident was Huang Xiang, a Chinese poet who had been sentenced to death in China for his participation in the Democracy Wall Movement. He and his wife Zhang Ling were granted asylum in the United States through City of Asylum.

On August 12, 2022, Reese was preparing to interview Rushdie on stage in New York when an attacker stabbed the author. During the attack, Reese received facial lacerations and a black eye. He later said, "Don’t be intimidated, if anything you should be re-energized by what we have just been through...You can't give into being silenced."

=== Writers in Residence ===
At least 10 writers-in-exile have stayed for more than a year in City of Asylum apartments, while another 20 international artist-in-residence writers have stayed one to three months.

Years	Writer	Country
2004–2006	Huang Xiang	China
2006–2011	Horacio Castellanos Moya	El Salvador
2006–2009	Khet Mar	Burma
2011–2018	Israel Centeno	Venezuela
2013–2015	Yaghoub Yadali	Iran
2016–present	Tuhin Das	Bangladesh
2017–2019	Osama Alomar	Syria
2019–2021	Bewketu Seyoum	Ethiopia
2021–present	Jorge Olivera Castillo	Cuba
2022–present	Anouar Rahmani	Algeria

=== Mural Houses ===
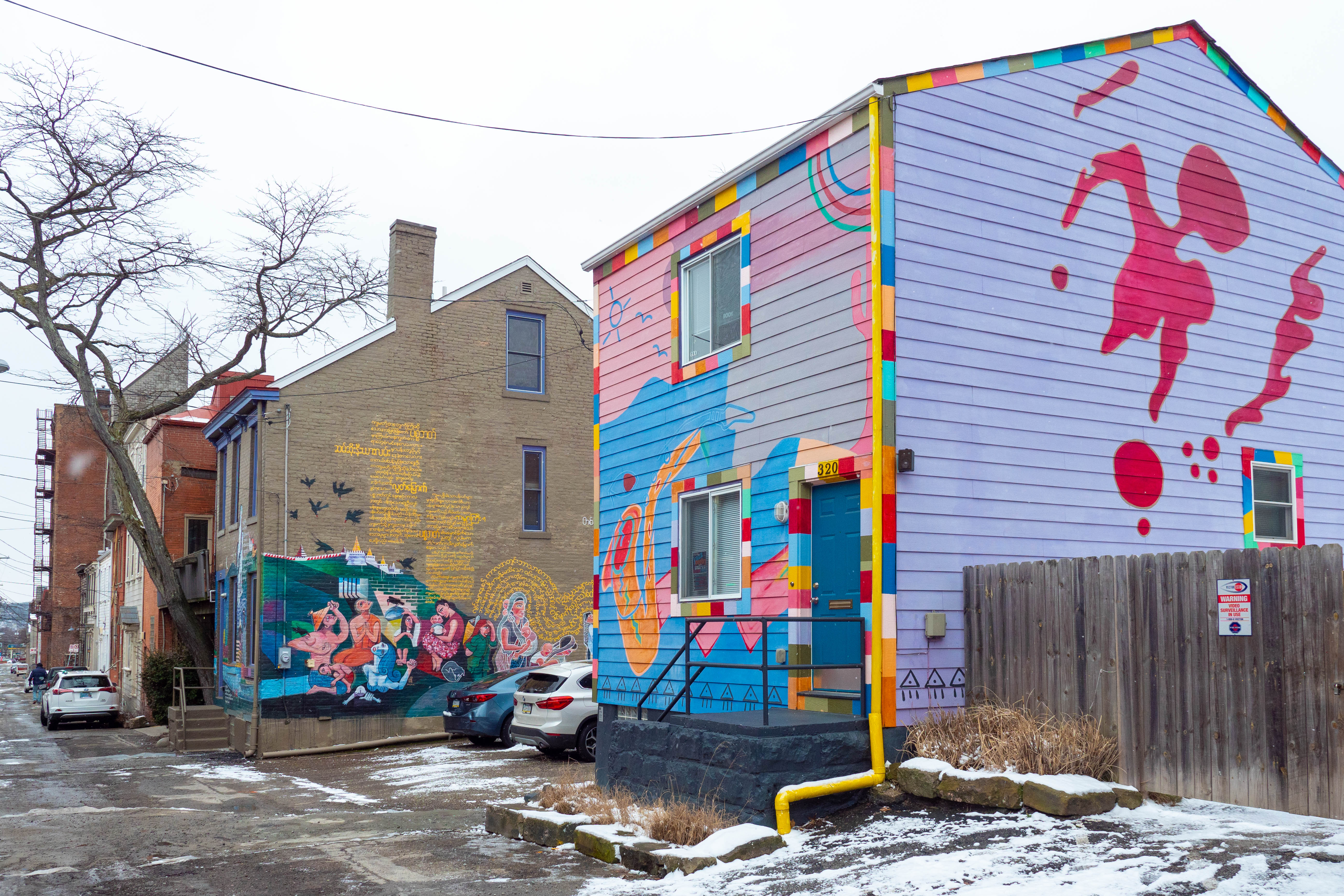
City of Asylum's houses provides residences to writers in exile.

Huang Xuang wanted to carve a poem into a mountain, but took Samuels' suggestion that he paint the poems on his house. The building became known as House Poem, and people have slipped their own poems into the mail slot. Other writers followed suit; as of 2021, five City of Asylum houses on Sampsonia Way have murals.

Year	Name	Artist	Address
2004	House Poem	Huang Xiang	408 Sampsonia Way
2006	Winged House	Thaddeus Mosley	402 Sampsonia Way
2009	Pittsburgh-Burma House	Than Htay Muang	324 Sampsonia Way
2010	Jazz House	Oliver Lake	320 Sampsonia Way
2021	Comma House	Tuhin Das	308 Sampsonia Way

== Projects ==
=== Alphabet City ===
In 2015, City of Asylum acquired a former Masonic Hall from the Urban Redevelopment Authority of Pittsburgh and launched a $12.2 million renovation. The project received $8 million in tax credits and additional funding from local foundations. Dubbed Alphabet City, the building now houses administrative offices, the City of Asylum bookstore, and a restaurant. All events held at the space are free.

City of Asylum Books, a separate entity from the non-profit organization, specializes in international and translated literature.

The first restaurant to open in the renovated Alphabet City was Casellula, a cheese and wine cafe with a strict no-tipping policy. The restaurant closed in late 2017, weeks after staff aired grievances on "Tipped Off", a restaurant industry blog. From 2018 to 2020, the restaurant space housed Brugge on North, a branch of Pittsburgh restaurants Point Brugge and Park Brugge. The current restaurant is Cucina Alfabeto, opened in 2024.

=== Jazz Poetry Month ===
Jazz Poetry was the first event put on by City of Asylum in 2005. It was a collaboration between Huang Xiang and jazz musician Oliver Lake. City of Asylum continued to host Jazz Poetry annually. In 2016, the format changed from a single concert to a full month of concerts.

=== River of Words ===
River of Words is a public art installation by exiled Venezuelan writer and artist resident Israel Centeno. The installation involved a choice of 100 words, all relevant to Pittsburgh, of which Mexican War Street neighbors were invited to display on the wall, door, or window of their houses. The representation of the words were designed by Venezuelan artists Carolina Arnal and Gisela Romero.

=== Sampsonia Way magazine ===
The City of Asylum publishes a magazine called Sampsonia Way which contains English translations of exiled writers. The publication's goal is to fight censorship and celebrate free expression in literature.
