= Gazi Rafiq =

Bangladeshi poet

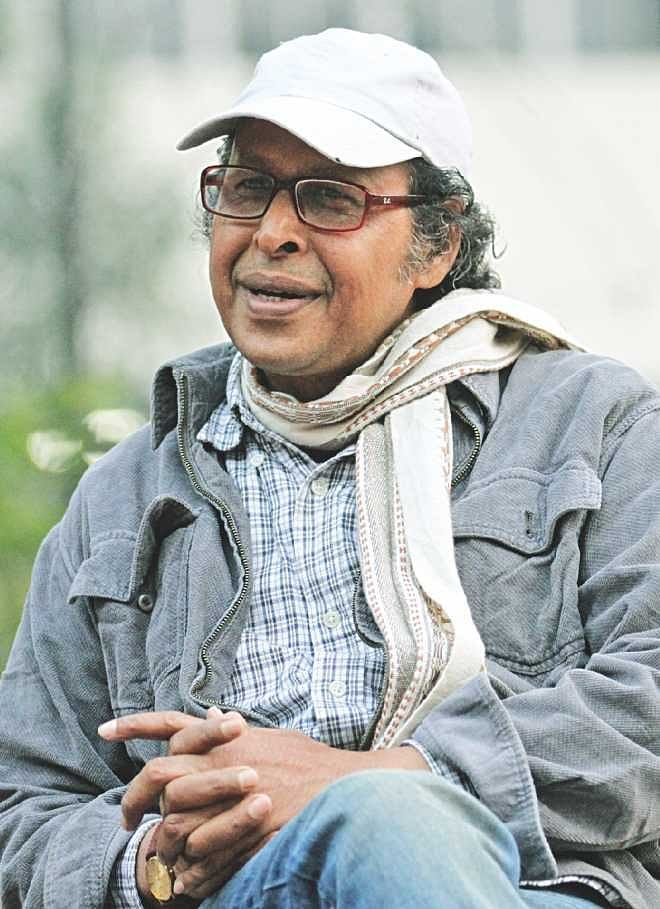
- Gazi Rafiq in 2014
- Born: September 1, 1958 (age 68); Feni, Bangladesh
- Education: University of Chittagong
- Occupations: Poet, scientist

Gazi Rafiq (Rafiqul Islam) is a Bangladeshi poet of the 1980s era and a food scientist.

== Early life ==
He was born on September 1, 1958, at Nur Boxh Miaji house in Feni, Bangladesh. His parents are Abdur Rahman (retired teacher) and Begum Jarifa Khatun.

After completing graduation from the University of Chittagong he pursued his career in journalism.

== Publications ==
=== Literary works ===
- Chetonar Phool - চেতনার ফুল (1982)
- Adianto Paradhin - আদি অণ্ত পরাধীন (1990)
- Manob Muktir Montro - মানব মুক্তির মন্ত্র (1996)
- Nonno Rupantorbad O Apracholito Kichhu Kabita - নব্য রূপান্তরবাদ ও অপ্রচলিত কিছু কবিতা (2003)
- Kalo Meye Kobita - কালো মেয়ে কবিতা (2009)
- Prithibir Shorboshreshtho Kobita - পৃথিবীর সর্বশ্রেষ্ঠ কবিতা (2010)
- Selected Poems - নির্বাচিত কবিতা (2013)
- Poetry by Gazi Rafiq - গাজী রফিকের কবিতা (2013).

==== Magazines ====
- Dusshomoyer Jatri - দুঃসময়ের যাত্রী (1988)
- Miraz - মিরাজ (1981)
- Eid Shubeccha - ঈদ শুভেচ্ছা (1982)
- Rokter Badole - রক্তের বদলে (1983)
- Kabitabiggyan - কবিতাবিজ্ঞান (2008)

==== Edited books ====
- Kobider Prem - কবিদের প্রেম (1997),
- Poems of Transformation Ashidashak - আশি দশকের কবিতা (2003).

== Social activities ==
- Organised:"Durniti Protirodhe Juba Shangha" in1977
- Organised; Dishari Shanscritic Gosthi in 1980
- Founded Feni Shahitta Parishad in1993.
- Organised a Cultural Organisation Named; Hindowl at Chittagong University Campus

== Research ==
- "Difference of Mass in Applying Alternative Method of Cooking Rice" 2012. He advocated to reduce nutritional waste cooking level (NWCL) using Sticky Rice Theory (Pustibhat Tatto). A finding of 13-15% rice wastage was identified in 2012 by applying his invented 'Heat and Weight Method' using excess water in rice at cooking level. From 2024, this theory has been adopted by government education curriculum and included in the textbook Shastho Shurokkha, published by National Curriculum and Textbook Board(NCTB). Recently a press conference was held at National Press Club, Dhaka titled "Pushtibhat Convention"
- Between 2012 and 2019, he developed a flour combination called OryFoCoT, a relative mixture of wheat flour and rice bran. It has anti-inflammatory properties and reduces gluten levels to tolerable levels.

== Awards ==
- Writers Foundation Award (2008)
- Shahid Buddhijibi Shriti award (2006)
- Haji Nur Ahamad Shriti award (2006)
