= Kolkata Little Magazine Library And Research Center =

- কলিকাতা লিটল ম্যাগাজিন লাইব্রেরি ও গবেষণা কেন্দ্র
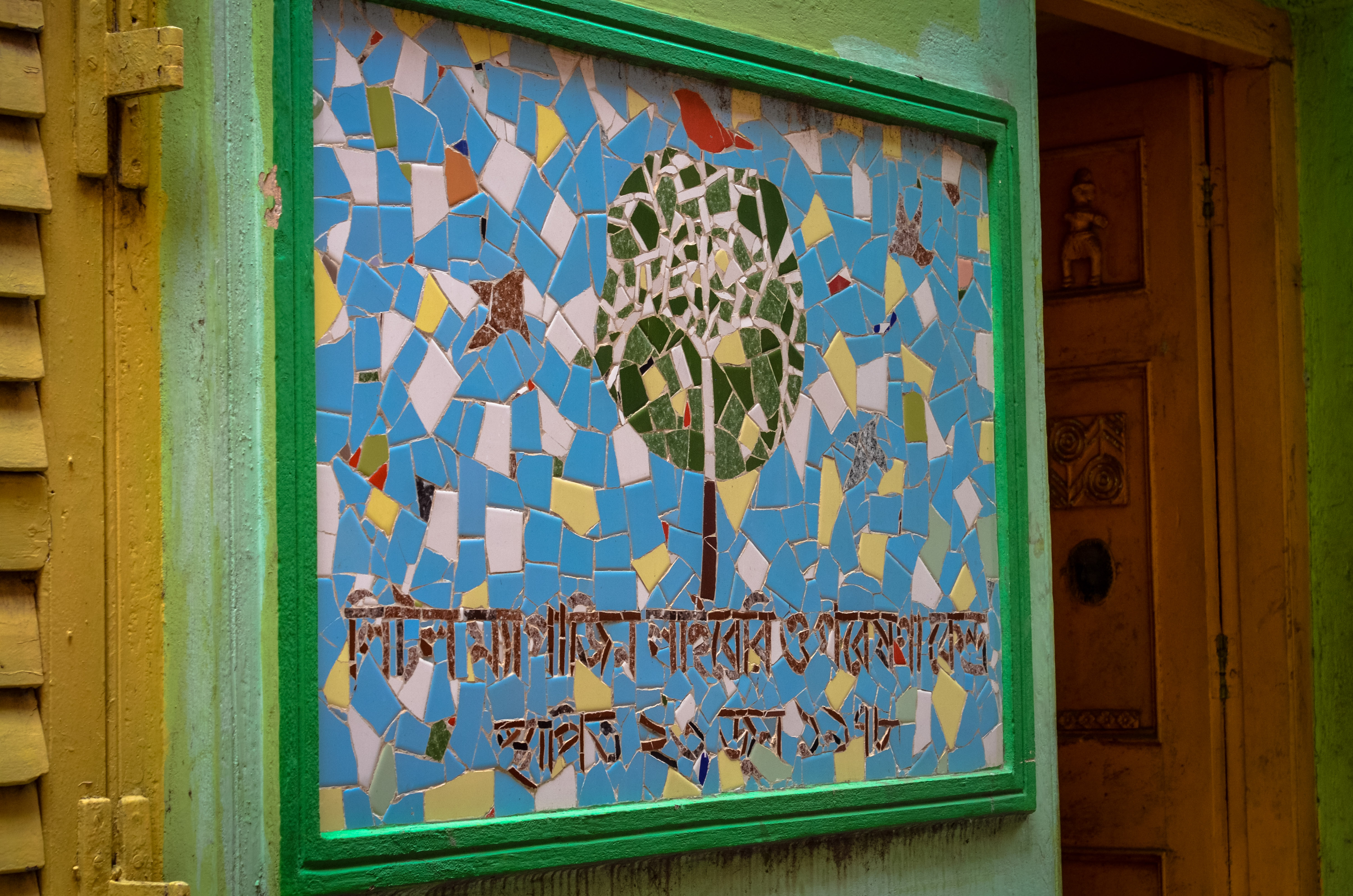
- Kolkata Little Magazine Library
- 22.57699103112569°N 88.3657098954383°E
- Location: Kolkata, India

Kolkata Little Magazine Library And Research Center is a privately owned library of alternative and experimental literary magazines in Kolkata, India. It was founded by Sandip Dutta on 23 June 1978 with a small number of periodicals which grew to one of the finest collection of alternative magazines in India. The library is situated at Tamer Lane in College Street in the Boipara neighbourhood of North Kolkata.

== Background ==
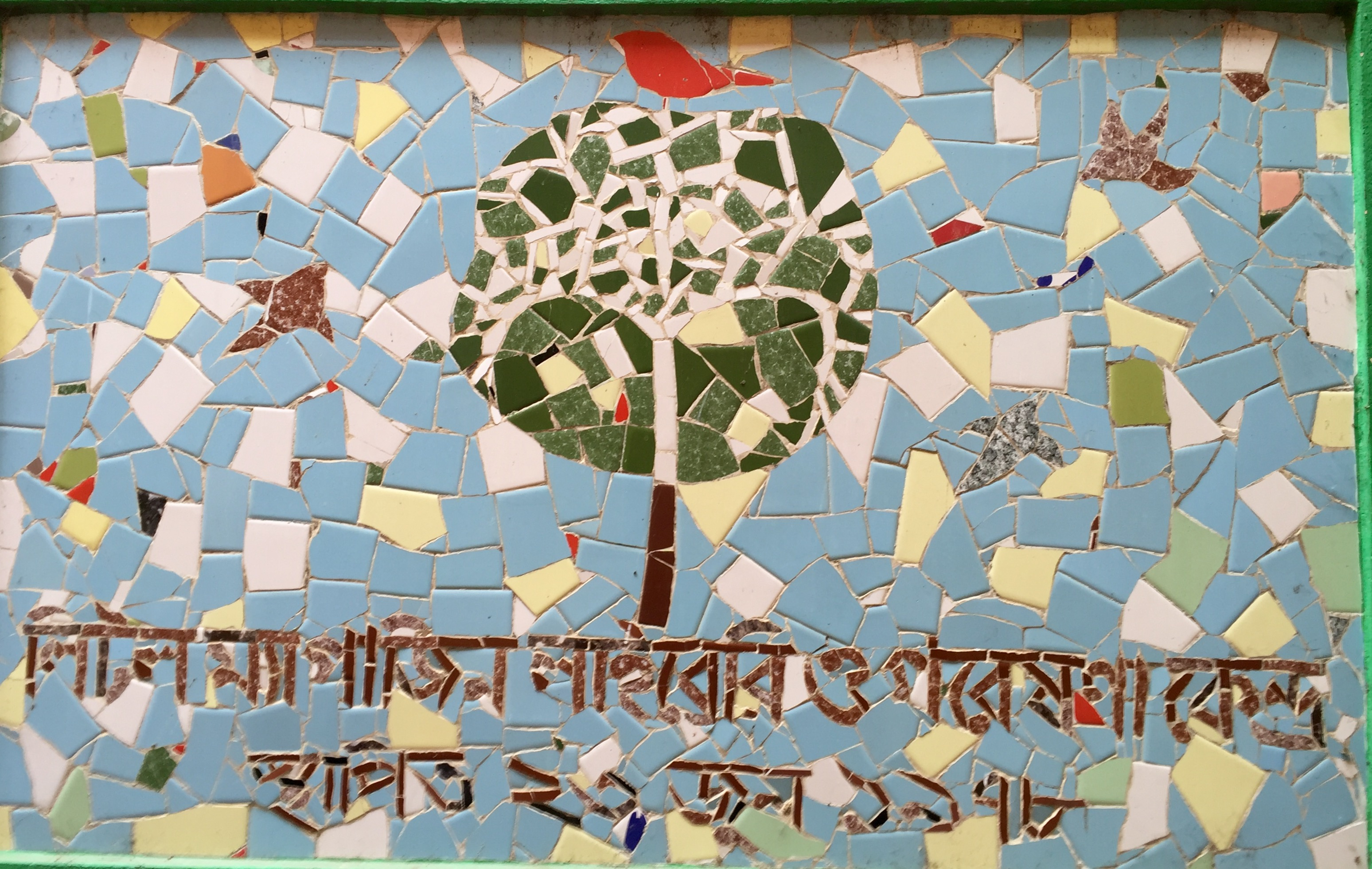
Kolkata Little Magazine Library

Kolkata has a prominent place in the history of Little Magazine Movement in India which was largely dominated by Bengali language magazines. This goes back to the foundation of Sabuj Patra in 1914 and Kallol in 1923. The tradition continued with the advent of Post Modernist writing in Bengali Literature. With the arrival of Krittibash, Hungry Generation and periodicals like Kourab many little magazines started to flourish. But there was never a comprehensive preservation attempt made for these immensely valuable cultural items either in the academic or public libraries.

== Foundation ==
In 1972, when Dutta (then 21 and a student of Scottish Church College in Kolkata majoring in Bengali) visited the National Library looking for little magazines he found out how they were kept in a condition of utter neglect. According to Dutta, he was "shown a heap of books tied in bundles, with more dust and worms in them than pages." Such poor maintenance of periodicals led Dutta, already a little magazine enthusiast at that time, to decide to establish a library dedicated solely to the purpose of collecting and preserving little magazines and promoting their cause. From 27 to 30 September 1972, Dutta held an exhibition at his own residence of 750 little magazines in protest.

In 1976, when Calcutta Book Fair started, Little Magazine participated in it and Dutta was one of the participants. The library was born on 23 June 1978 and was called "Library and Laboratory for Bengali Little Magazines" ("Bangla Samoyikpatra Pathagar O Gobeshona Kendro"). It was established in the ground floor of Dutta's two storey ancestral home at 18M Tamer lane off College Street book market. Even now it consists of only two rooms at there. The library became open for public membership on 8 May 1979. It was officially registered in 1996 and then officially renamed "Kolkata Little Magazine Library and Research Center".

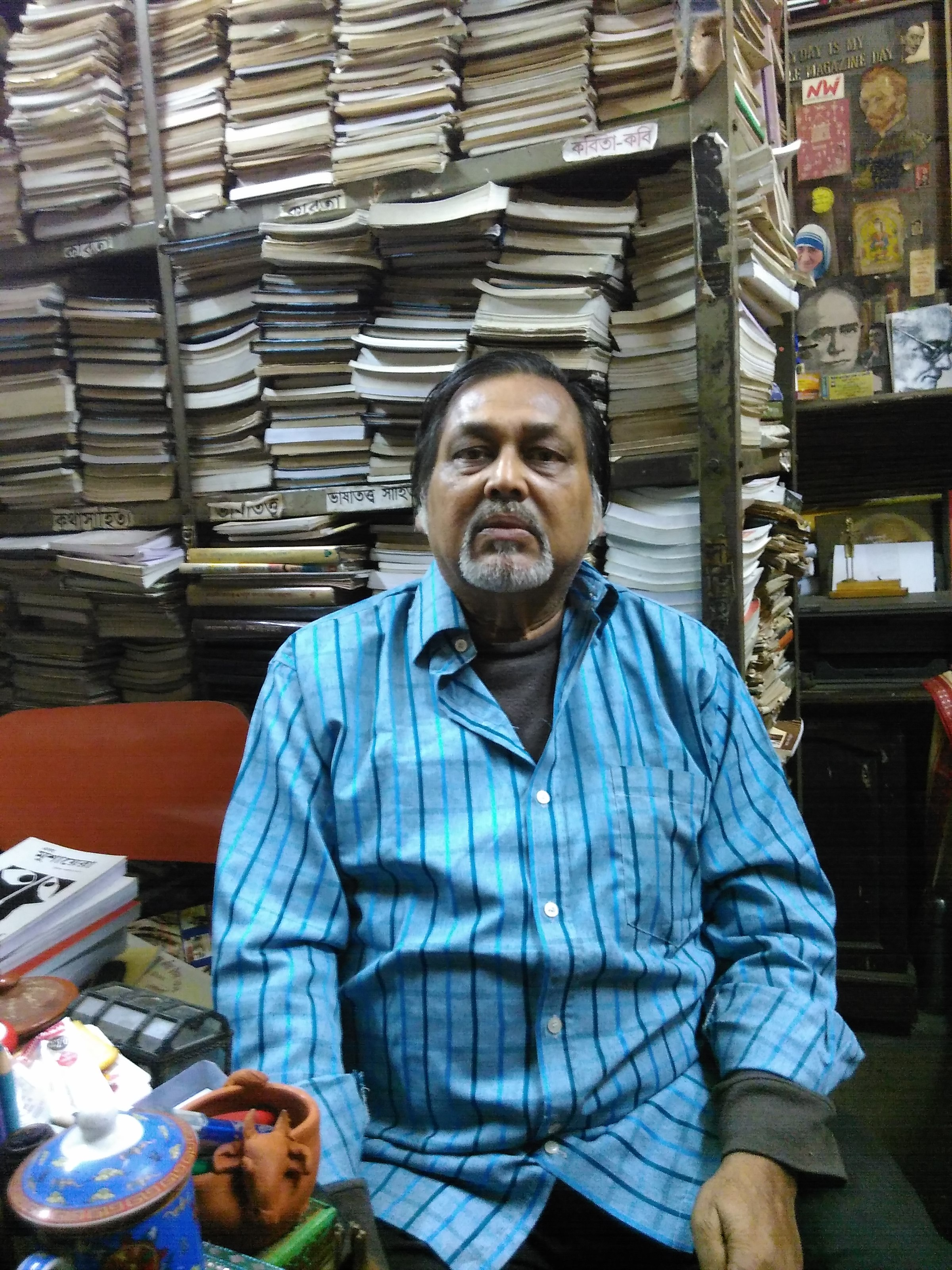
Dutta in his residence and Little Magazine Library

== Budget ==
From the beginning, the library was founded on the efforts of Dutta who faced financial constraints. So he made a piggy bank and named it "Three Penny Opera" after Bertolt Brecht's famous play of the same name. He also consistently set aside a part of his personal income. Currently, the library has an annual budget of approx. Rs 15,000.

== Members ==
As of 2020, the Little Magazine Library has over 150 members, of whom more than 50 are members for life. There are at least 10-12 visitors to the library daily. Members come from all spheres of the society. There are students, professionals, research scholars, authors, journalists who consult the library on a regular basis. Notable personalities who have consulted the library include the poet Joy Goswami and the author Mahasweta Devi. According to the library website, readers come from other parts of India and neighbouring Bangladesh as well.

== Collection ==
Dutta's library began functioning with a modest collection of about one thousand and five hundred little magazines. As of 2020, there are almost 80,000 experimental, radical, alternative and avant-garde periodicals and little magazines in the collection. There are also 2,000 books of poetry. Most of the collection is in Bengali but there are books and periodicals in other languages as well, including English and Hindi. Subjects range from literature to broader disciplines of social science and humanities. In all, there are more than 4,000 books in the library. It has a reading room where up to 15 people can study together at a time. The library has many rare periodicals which are out of print or hard to find anywhere else. Prominent little magazines in the library include:

Sabuj Patra (founded by Pramatha Chaudhuri)
Kallol, Langol (whose contributors included Mujaffar Ahmed and Kazi Nazrul Islam)
Sanghati
Pragati
Mayukh
Kali Kalam
Parichay
Bangalaxmi
Nabayug, Dhumketu
Nachghar, Bangashree
Purbasha (published from Tripura)
Kobita and Chaturanga (both edited by Buddhadeb Bosu)
Arani
Samasamoyik
Galpabharati
Prama
Ekshan (edited by Nirmalya Acharya and the actor Soumitra Chatterjee)
Uttarsuri
Bartaman
Satabdi (edited by Biren Mukherjee)
Bhabishyat (edited by Shubho Tagore)
Uccharan
Darshak
Anik
Nandimukh
Kobita Parichay
Chatushkon
Krittibash (edited by Sunil Gangopadhyay and Dipak Majumdar)
Anustup (founded and edited by Anil Acharya)
Kolkata
Nabanno
Shatabhisha
Golpo O Kobita
Kourab
Dhrupadi
Kobita Saptahiki (edited by the poet Shakti Chattopadhyay)

There are also some rare Hungry Generation pamphlets and periodicals in the collection which is the only place in world where Hungry Generation bulletins, manifesto, magazines etc have been preserved.

== Further effort ==
Little Magazine Library was the main organiser of All India Little Magazine Conference in Kolkata in 1993 and Santali Dogra writers workshop in 2000. It also conducts bibliography of essays published on various little magazines. It organises two awards: one for best little magazine and other for an eminent literary personality called Saraswata Award). Dutta has organized many seminars and exhibitions all over India to spread awareness about little magazines. The research centre itself publishes a little magazines titled Ujjwal Uddhar which reprints old and rare articles of relevance from older little magazines. In 2008, the library received a grant of Rs 500,000 to digitise its collection. Prama, Ekshan, Parichay and Bangadarshan have been preserved digitally. Dutta has written a book and published several articles for various publications on the evolution and history of little magazines. His library is a regular participant in the Kolkata Book Fair, the Little Magazine Mela and other book fairs across the state.

== Opening hours ==
Day	Times
Tuesday	4.30pm-7.00pm
Wednesday	7.00pm-9.00pm
Thursday	4.30pm-7.00pm
Saturday	2.00pm-7.00pm
Sunday	10.00am-12.00pm (March–September)
Last Sunday of the month	Closed

== See also ==
- Little magazine movement
