= Century Mountain =

Art collaboration between Huang Xiang and William Rock

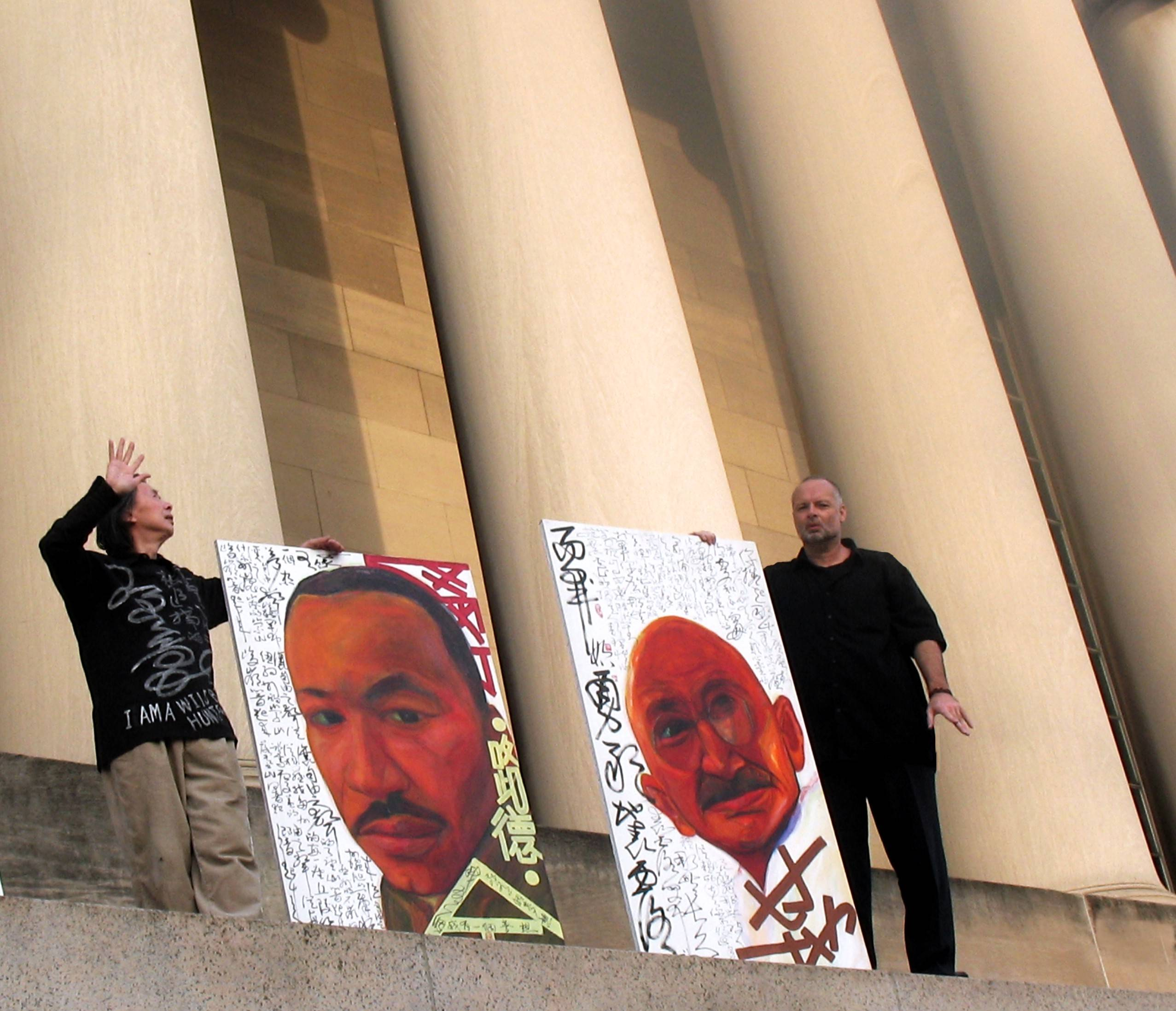
Huang Xiang and William Rock with their Century Mountain paintings of Martin Luther King and Gandhi.

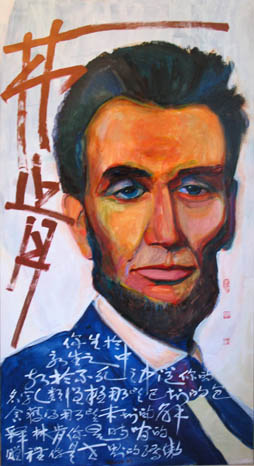
Huang Xiang and William Rock, Century Mountain portrait of Lincoln

The Century Mountain Project is an East/West collaboration of art between the Chinese poet and calligrapher Huang Xiang and American artist William Rock. Their paintings, which feature Huang Xiang's calligraphy and poetry and William Rock's painted portraits, honor outstanding thinkers, creators, discoverers, leaders—essentially people who stood out like mountains throughout the centuries. Their subjects include Mozart, Lincoln, Gandhi, Mother Teresa, Rimbaud, Phillis Wheatley, Li Bai, Murasaki Shikibu, Malcolm X, Isadora Duncan, and Edgar Allan Poe.

In 2009, their portrait of Anne Frank was exhibited at the Peter Wilhelm Art Center in Budapest; and in June 2010 an exhibit of Huang Xiang and William Rock's Century Mountain paintings was organized by the city of Tarragona, Spain.

The artwork created between Huang Xiang and William Rock began in 2006 and continues as an ongoing collaboration. There is no cultural, gender, or race distinctions with regard to the subjects depicted.

Seeing the collaborative paintings of Huang Xiang and William Rock is like having a personal encounter with the subject depicted. They have life. This Western style image with calligraphy is not what one usually sees. William Rock is aware of the negative space and Huang Xiang is using the calligraphy to create as an artist would. Formally the artists are opening to accommodate each other. Both artists working together as one. Huang Xiang knows intuitively and instinctively how to place the calligraphy in relation to the image. The calligraphy of Huang Xiang is special, modern and personal. It is striking! An East/West collaboration, the work is like that of Xu Bing. The fact that Huang Xiang's calligraphy is making commentary about the image adds to the many layers of this work. The paintings have a lot of energy." — Dr. Stanely Murashige, Specialist in contemporary Chinese art / The Art Institute of Chicago

== Huang Xiang early life ==
Huang Xiang was born on December 26, 1941, in Guidong County of Hunan Province. At the time of his birth there occurred a great fire. The fire spreading through his neighborhood reached the very wall of the family compound; newborn Huang and his mother, still connected by the umbilical cord, had to be carried to safety to a nearby temple.

Huang's father was in charge of supply for the army group that fought the GMD's last great campaign in Shenyang Province of Manchuria in 1948. The decisive battle there, 'Liaoshen,' was won by the communists, and Huang's father was captured. The family learned late in 1951 that earlier that year Huang's father had been summarily shot in a prison camp near Beijing.

Huang Xiang was only nine years old when he first personally suffered similar treatment. One day in all innocence he pulled an ailing fish from the village well. Immediately the village headman grabbed him and accused him of poisoning the well. For three nights Huang was bound in a dark room, and paraded daily through the streets wearing a dunce cap bearing the legend "Huang Xiang counterrevolutionary poisoner of wells." He was only released when chemical analysis failed to detect any poison in the fish.

Although an excellent student in grade school, he was not permitted to matriculate into middle school because of his class origins. The denial of public education left Huang Xiang feeling severely hurt, for he strongly desired to continue his schooling. The quandary was soon alleviated, however, when he discovered in a concealed loft in his grandparents, home a treasure trove of college books that his father had put away years earlier. Though aged only ten, he began reading them with a will. Most of the books were in Chinese; they included classic works of Lao Tzu, Zhuangzi, Li Bo and Du Fu, plus political treatises by Sun Yat-sen, Chiang Kai-shek and others, as well as books of literature, political economy, philosophy, religion and the arts. there was also translation of major western authors, poets and statesman, plus the French "Declaration of Right" and the American "Declaration of Independence." moreover there were the extensive notes made by his father in a notebook, including quotations from Walt Whitman, Ralph Waldo Emerson, George Washington and Abraham Lincoln, as well as Kant, Hegel, Nietzsche, Schopenhauer, Goethe, Marx, Freud and others.

While working at a Metals Factory at the age of seventeen in 1958, Huang Xiang had several of his poems accepted for publication. These early efforts were entirely in the style accepted by the regime. Huang was invited to join the Guizhou branch of The All-China Writers Association, then its youngest member. Conformity is not one of his attributes, however, he soon became dissatisfied with the tight limitations on style and subject matter that prevailed, and determined to eschew them completely in the future.

Bored with the unchanging Metal factory routine. ignoring the need for official permission, he boarded a train for the Gobi desert. With roving eyes always open, Huang Xiang soon spied and befriended a half-Tibetan girl who spoke educated Mandarin. Inspired by her, he wrote poetry and perhaps naively he mailed copies of these poems back to friends at the Metal factory. The poems were intercepted by a factory official and was alarmed other workers may want to leave and follow Huang Xiang. A security officer was sent to the Gobi to arrest him. To Huang's great humiliation, the arresting officer charged him in front of other workers "with being an active counterrevolutionary who hated the Communist party and intended to escape across the border." This marked Huang Xiang's introduction to the Chinese equivalent of the Soviet Gulags. Huang's cell was barely larger than a bed. It had no window only a hole in the ceiling. The stench was horrible. Huang received extra rough treatment, he was made to carry heavy bricks in the hot sun. During this period, he was accused of writing a reactionary slogan on a toilet wall. The rough treatment increased. One punishment was Huang had to stand on broken bricks with his wrists bound with wire tight enough to cut. He was forced to stand this way all night.

The Party promptly expelled him from The Writers Association, and proposed an absolute ban on publishing his writing for forty years. Huang Xiang was eventually sent to various prison camps. Huang Xiang continued to secretly write poems.

Once again Huang became a target and found himself in trouble with the authorities. He was sentenced to three years of hard labor, being required to sleep in a cattle shed and he was physically escorted to the hills to do extra hard work.

In 1967, Huang Xiang was on the verge of entering a new phase of his life, beginning to write the serious poems that survive and that mark him as a man of ability, perception and courage. In 1968 Huang wrote the first of his major political poems, "Wild Beasts" which was well received by the salon.

During this period Huang married his first wife Ai Youjun. They had a young son named Yingzi,"Yingzi" means eagle symbolizing freedom. Yingzi became ill and Huang requested permission at the work camp where he was assigned to visit his nine-month-old son in the hospital. His request was denied by the Revolutionary Committee. When he protested he received criticism and denunciation; when he refused to bow his head, they hung a heavy weight from his neck from a wire that drew blood. Soon Huang received a death notice from the hospital. Exploding in a frenzy, he bolted shouting from the compound and ran to the hospital. Finding the incubator empty, he was directed by an indifferent doctor to the morgue. After opening several crude coffins, he spied one that was partially broken, a rat jumped out. Opening it, he found his son. part of his ear had been bitten off, and he was bleeding from his eyes, nose and mouth. A finger moved. He was not even dead! Huang carried the small body to the main office, and was assigned a room for the night. Within hours Yingzi was dead. Huang was not at all silent in his anger and grief. An official came and berated Huang for disturbing the revolutionary order of the hospital. The next day Huang carried his son's lifeless body up a hill, and after sitting with him for some hours in a state of deep grief, buried him on a sunny slope above the city. Huang's disoriented wanderings in those devastating circumstances are set forth in his poem "Song of Life," dated October 29, 1970. ^{1}

== The Democracy Wall and Huang Xiang ==
In 1978 Huang Xiang was the first to post on the Democracy Wall in Beijing.

China's movement for democracy has been carried forward in thousands of poems and one poet has emerged supreme: Huang Xiang of the Enlightenment Society. When Huang and his companions had come together some years before in their poor, remote home province of Guizhou "to study social problems, under the merciless oppression and cultural despotism of Lin Biao and the Gang of Four," they had asked themselves why China, with its long history of civilization, progressed so slowly, when Yugoslavia, also a "socialist" state, had developed quickly. Like many in their generation they concluded that the first thing to do was to establish respect for human rights and democracy. They differed from some of their contemporaries in that they read Western classics and respected Buddhism, Christianity, Islam and Chinese Mysticism. But what distinguished them more than anything else was the visionary poet in their midst. It is characteristic that Huang Xiang was presented not as an individual but as a member of a group. Reading the poems and commentaries published by the society, it is clear he drew strength and enrichment from his companions. In turn he became their most eloquent voice.

Huang claimed that he was harassed by the authorities after reciting his poems before young people. The police searched for his manuscripts, but he had hidden them in candles by wrapping them in plastic bags, then rolling around them wicks, then finally molding wax around them. He melted the candles to get the poems out. On 11 October 1978 they pasted them up on the blank walls of an alleyway that runs beside the offices of the People's Daily, in the busy shopping center of the capital. Huang had taken trouble with the design of the posters to present as clearly as possible the poetry they bore. He brushed his large characters in red instead of black ink. He painted the emblem of the Enlightenment Society, a flaming torch of learning, at the beginning of the poster and between poems. After the last panel, he pasted blank sheets for readers comments.

Six weeks later, when free speech was blossoming on the Democracy Wall, Huang wrote the poems out again as a new ninety-four-panel poster of even larger characters. this he displayed on seventy yards of fence high on an embankment in Tiananmen Square, facing Mao's mausoleum. The site enabled a thousand readers to read the poems at the same time. The poems announce the advent of a god who brings enlightenment to a people living on the darkness of totalitarian dictatorship. ^{2}

== Huang Xiang 2010 ==
Huang Xiang uses his art and poetry to build a bridge between East and West and to honor a "Universal Humanity". He considers the paintings in the Century Mountain Project he creates with William Rock, "highly creative something that has not been done before." Huang Xiang completed a Residency with The City of Asylum Pittsburgh in 2007. In April 2008 he returned to China and visited family and friends for the first time in eleven years. Currently, he lives in New York city with his wife, the writer, Zhang Ling.

== William Rock Biography ==
William Rock was born in Lorain, Ohio, on July 3. He was raised in Pittsburgh, Pennsylvania and lived his early adult life in Los Angeles, California. He applied for and received his Irish citizenship while living in Paris in 1992. He studied drawing at the California Art Institute and taught himself to paint and sculpt by traveling to museums around the world. He has been immersed in Eastern thought and practice for eighteen years studying and teaching with Chinese and Tibetan monks. His art is exhibited internationally and he has taught and spoken extensively about the nature of creativity, mysticism and art. He has been instrumental in producing several cultural events that promote the arts as a universal dialogue for humanity.

== See also ==
- Three perfections – integration of calligraphy, poetry and painting

== Bibliography ==
- Emerson, A. "A Bilingual Edition of Poetry Out of Communist China by Huang Xiang", (2004) New York, The Edwin Mellen Press
