= Suprobhat Bangladesh =

Suprobhat Bangladesh সুপ্রভাত বাংলাদেশ
- Type: Daily newspaper
- Format: Broadsheet
- Founder: Rusho Mahmud
- Publisher: Rusho Mahmud
- Editor: Rusho Mahmud
- Founded: 17 August 2004
- Language: Bengali
- Headquarters: Press Club Building, 5th Floor, Jamalkhan Road; Chittagong-4000, Bangladesh
- Website: www.suprobhat.com www.esuprobhat.com

Suprobhat Bangladesh (Bengali: সুপ্রভাত বাংলাদেশ Suprobhat Bangladesh "Good Morning Bangladesh") is a regional daily newspaper in Bangladesh, published from Chittagong in the Bengali language. Rusho Mahmud has been the editor of the newspaper since its founding.

== Supplements ==
- দেউড়ি Dewri ("Dewri"): Daily Lifestyle & Entertainment supplement
- রাজনীতি Rajneeti ("Politics"): Saturday featured supplement
- শিল্পসাহিত্য Shilpashahitya ("Art and literature"): Friday featured supplement on art and literature
- সুপ্রভাত সুহৃদ Supribhat Suhrid ("Good Morning friend"): Sunday featured supplement

== See also ==
- List of newspapers in Bangladesh
