= Songs of Life Festival =

Music festival in Bulgaria and Israel

Songs of Life is a music festival produced by Varna International. The production commemorates through music the rescue of 49,000 Bulgarian Jews during World War II.

== The Story ==
In 1941, Bulgaria allied itself with Germany to regain the area of Dobruja which it had lost several years earlier at the signing of the Treaty of Neuilly-sur-Seine in 1919 after the War. In early 1943, Nazi officials requested that Bulgaria deport its Jewish population to workcamps throughout Germany and Poland. Later that year, King Boris succumbed to the German demand for the extradition of 11,343 Jews from territories re-occupied by Bulgaria. When trains came to take 49,000 more Bulgarian Jews to the death camps, the Bulgarian people resisted the demands of the German government and refused to allow their Jewish neighbors to be sent to concentration camps in what was the single largest non-deportation of Jews during World War II.

== The Performance ==
The Songs of Life Festival debuted in November 2008 on the 65th anniversary of the rescue in the Bulgarian cities of Sofia and Plovdiv and in Petah Tikva and Jerusalem in Israel. Ernest Bloch’s choral-orchestral piece, Sacred Service, a Jewish work, was performed. During the inaugural festival, 49,000 flowers were distributed to the people of Bulgaria. Auditors and musicians from the United States, Canada, Bulgaria and Israel attended and participated in the festival.

In 2010, the directors commissioned librettist Scott Caims, and Bulgarian composer, Georgi Andreev, to write an oratorio to narrate the story of the rescue. The resulting work, A Melancholy Beauty, combined classical choral-orchestral music with traditional rhythms and folk styles and Bulgarian instruments such as the gadulka and kaval.

In 2011, A Melancholy Beauty debuted in the United States for the Second Songs of Life Festival. More than 300 performers participated, including the National Philharmonic Orchestra, the Indianapolis Children’s Choir, the National Philharmonic Chorale, Khorikos, and the Philip Kutev National Folklore Ensemble of Bulgaria. The performance was conducted by Henry Leck. A Melancholy Beauty was performed in the Kennedy Center in Washington D.C., the Avery Fisher Hall at Lincoln Center in New York City, and the Wang Theatre of the Citi Performing Arts Center in Boston.

In 2013, the Songs of Life Festival, featuring A Melancholy Beauty, took place in both Columbia and Charleston, South Carolina.

== Critical acclaim ==
Songs of Life has been featured in The Washington Post, New York Times, The Boston Herald, The Boston Globe, The Boston Musical Intelligencer, and The Jewish Week.

== See also ==
- Holocaust
- History of the Jews in Europe
