= Moyukh Chowdhury =

Bangladeshi poet

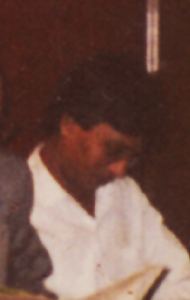
- Moyukh in 1991
- Born: Anwarul Azim; October 22, 1950 (age 75); South Nalapara, Chittagong, East Bengal, Pakistan
- Citizenship: Bangladesh
- Education: University of Chittagong
- Occupations: Poet; Author; Critic; Researcher; Professor
- Spouse: Taslima Shirin
- Writing career
- Pen name: Moyukh Chowdhury
- Language: Bengali
- Years active: 1973–present
- Period: 20th century
- Genre: Modernist
- Notable awards: Chittagong City Corporation Literary Award (2015)

Moyukh Chowdhury (Bengali: ময়ুখ চৌধুরী; born 22 October 1950) is a Bangladeshi poet, critic, researcher and professor. He has published poetry and research. He has drawn attention from readers since the 1980s.

== Background ==
Moyukh Chowdhury was born in Chittagong in 1950. He spent his childhood in bank of the Karnaphuli south of Chittagong.

== Bibliography ==
=== Poetry ===
- Kaalo Boropher Pratibeshee (1973)
- Ardhek Roechi Jale, Ardhek Jale (1999)
- Tomar Janalay Jege Aachhi Chandramallika (2000)
- Pariser Neelruti (2001)
- Amar Astey Akto Deri Hotey Parey (2002)
- palatok pendulam (2015)

=== Researches ===
- Unish Shatoker Nobocetona O Bangla Kabber Goti-Prokriti (1996)

=== Editorials ===
- Asobhyo Swabda (1973)

=== Literary magazine ===
- Prateeti (1968)
- Kabita (1970)

== Awards and honor ==
Year	Awards	Category	Provider	Note
2015	Chittagong City Corporation Literary Award	Poetry	Chittagong City Corporation	
