= Monthly Pay Order =

Educational subvention system in Bangladesh

- Abbreviation: MPO
- Founded: 1980
- Type: Government programme
- Location: Bangladesh
- Parent organization: Government of Bangladesh

The Monthly Pay Order (MPO) is an educational subvention system in Bangladesh where the government subsidizes the payroll of educators and staff in non-government educational institutions, including secondary schools, degree colleges, madrasas, and technical institutes. Operating on a public-private hybrid model, the Government of Bangladesh provides 100% of the basic national salary to formally enlisted private teachers, thereby stabilizing the financial viability of institutions that would otherwise rely exclusively on student tuition fees.

The system emerged in 1980 to support private and community-driven initiatives after the independence of Bangladesh, initially covering 50% of the basic salary equivalent to a government teacher. It was expanded to 100% in 2006 to handle demographic demands. As of the mid-2020s, the MPO system supports over 27,000 educational institutions and more than 500,000 educators. The framework is governed by agencies such as the Directorate of Secondary and Higher Education (DSHE).

== Scale and impact ==
Within formalized mainstream secondary and higher secondary sectors, reliance on the MPO subvention is near-absolute. According to demographic data from the Bangladesh Bureau of Educational Information and Statistics (BANBEIS), 94.76% of mainstream secondary schools and 88.87% of operating madrasas are supported by the MPO scheme.

However, a vast shadow sector remains. Out of an estimated 92,392 operational private educational entities across Bangladesh, approximately 73.6% function without state financial assistance, leaving educators relying entirely on localized tuition.

== Issues and reforms ==
=== Disparities and the "MPO Paradox" ===
The MPO system has faced substantial criticism due to structural wage disparities, administrative corruption, and a lack of quality control, commonly described by analysts as the "MPO Paradox". It enforces severe economic discrimination between fully fledged government-employed teachers and MPO-enlisted private teachers, despite both facing rigorous academic training overseen by the Non-Government Teachers' Registration and Certification Authority (NTRCA).

While equivalently qualified, MPO teachers receive significantly lower house rent, medical allowances, and festival bonuses compared to their government counterparts. They also lack a formalized state pension. Advanced econometric evaluations highlight profound deficits in cognitive learning outcomes under the MPO system. Financial preservation intrinsically rewards the ability to push underperforming students above the minimum passing threshold, thereby incentivizing a "teaching to the test" culture. The MPO registry process historically suffered from deep-seated corruption under a decentralized manual evaluation process, heavily relying on bribery.

=== 2025–2026 Civic unrest and MPO Policy 2025 ===
Accumulated economic degradation, systemic corruption, and rising living costs catalyzed massive civic unrest among MPO teachers spanning late 2025 to early 2026. Orchestrated by the Alliance for Nationalisation of Education, teacher unions staged continuous strikes in Dhaka following a marginal hike in the flat MPO house rent allowance on World Teachers' Day (October 5, 2025). The workers demanded complete nationalization of all MPO-enlisted private educational institutions to merge them into the formal civil service apparatus.

In response to the corruption crisis and union pressure, the Secondary and Higher Education Division introduced the "Non-Government Educational Institutions (Schools and Colleges) Manpower Structure and MPO Policy 2025". The policy mandated complete digitization of the MPO institutional enlistment process to bypass bribery syndicates and introduced Electronic Fund Transfer (EFT) to route monthly salaries directly into teachers' private bank accounts. The enlistment mechanism established explicit tier-based performance criteria designed to enforce institutional accountability, tying state financial support to institutional academic output via the Secondary School Certificate (SSC).

== See also ==
- Education in Bangladesh
- Non-Government Teachers' Registration and Certification Authority
- Ministry of Education (Bangladesh)
