= Shaheed Minar =

Shaheed Minar (lit. 'Martyrs' Monument') may refer to:

== Bangladesh ==
- Shaheed Minar, Dhaka, dedicated to those killed during the 1952 Bengali Language Movement
- Shaheed Minar (Jahangirnagar University)
- Shaheed Minar, at the Dhaka Polytechnic Institute
- Shaheed Minar, at the University of Rajshahi
- Shahid Minar, at the Patuakhali Science and Technology University

== India ==
- Shaheed Minar, Kolkata, dedicated to Indian freedom fighters
