= Helal Hafiz =

Bangladeshi poet (1948–2024)

- হেলাল হাফিজ
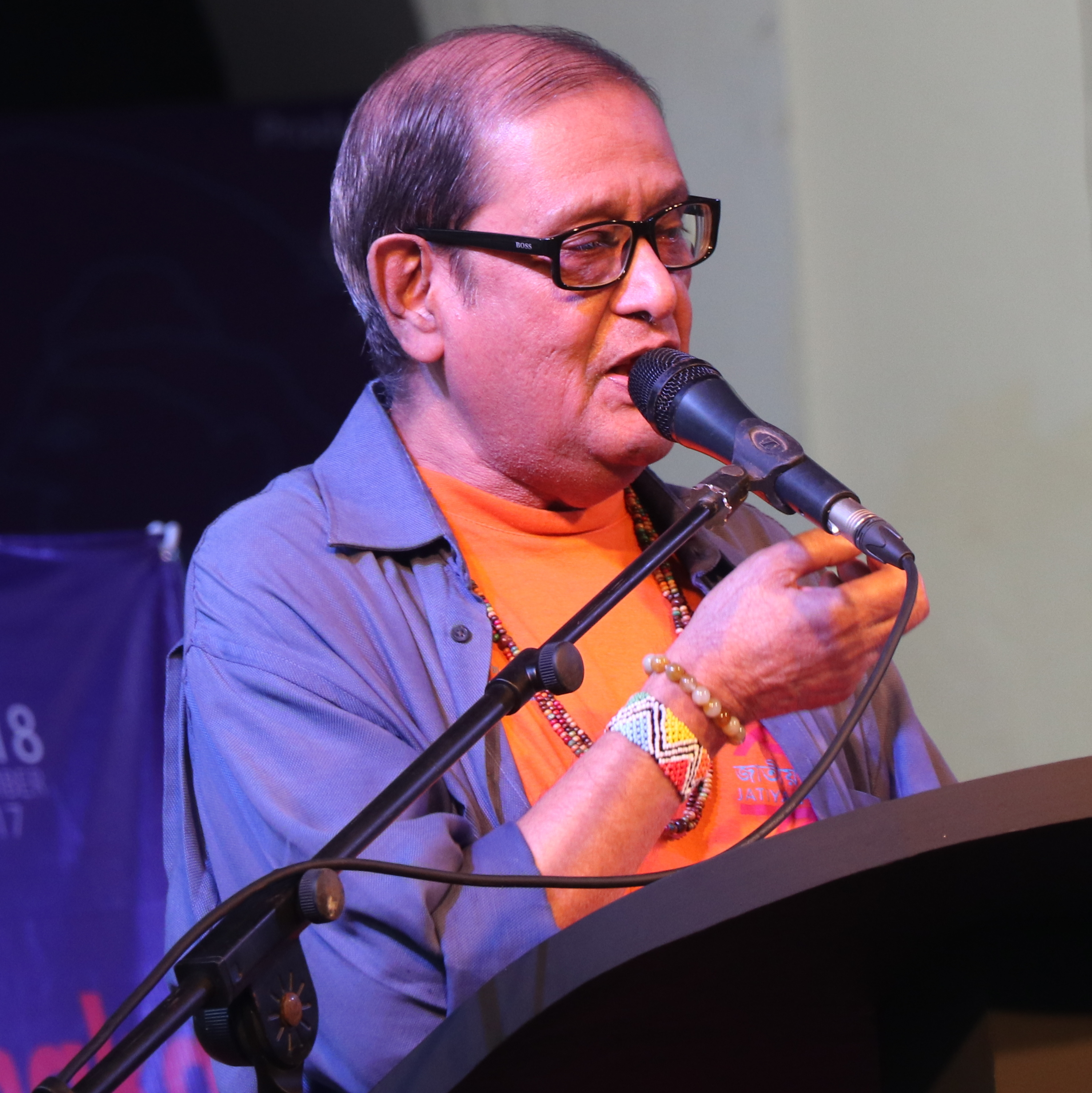
- Hafiz at Dhaka Lit Fest 2017
- Born: 7 October 1948; Netrokona, Dhaka Division, East Bengal, Pakistan
- Died: 13 December 2024 (aged 76); Dhaka, Bangladesh
- Education: University of Dhaka
- Occupations: Writer; literary editor
- Writing career
- Language: Bengali
- Notable awards: Bangla Academy Literary Award (2014); Ekushey Padak (2025)

Helal Hafiz (7 October 1948 – 13 December 2024) was a Bangladeshi poet. He won the Bangla Academy Literary Award (2013).

== Early life, education, and career ==
On completion of his schooling and college studies in his hometown in northern Netrokona, Hafiz enrolled at the University of Dhaka, at a time when it appeared as the main centre of the brewing nationalist movement, which eventually saw the 1971 emergence of independent Bangladesh. He is considered a true representative of the poets of his generation. He studied at Netrokona Datta High School, Netrokona College, and University of Dhaka. Hafiz was an established poet long before the publication of his first collection of poems: Je Jale Agun Jwale (The water where fire is ignited) in 1986. It earned the best sellers status in Ekushey Book Fair of the year, discarding novels by popular writers who traditionally occupy the position in Bangladesh's biggest annual book fair. "Nishiddha Sampadakiya" (The Banned Editorial), one of his most quoted poems inspired at least two generations since the pre-independence nationalist upsurge of 1969 and pro-democracy campaigns in post independence periods.

Hafiz died in Dhaka on 13 December 2024, at the age of 76.

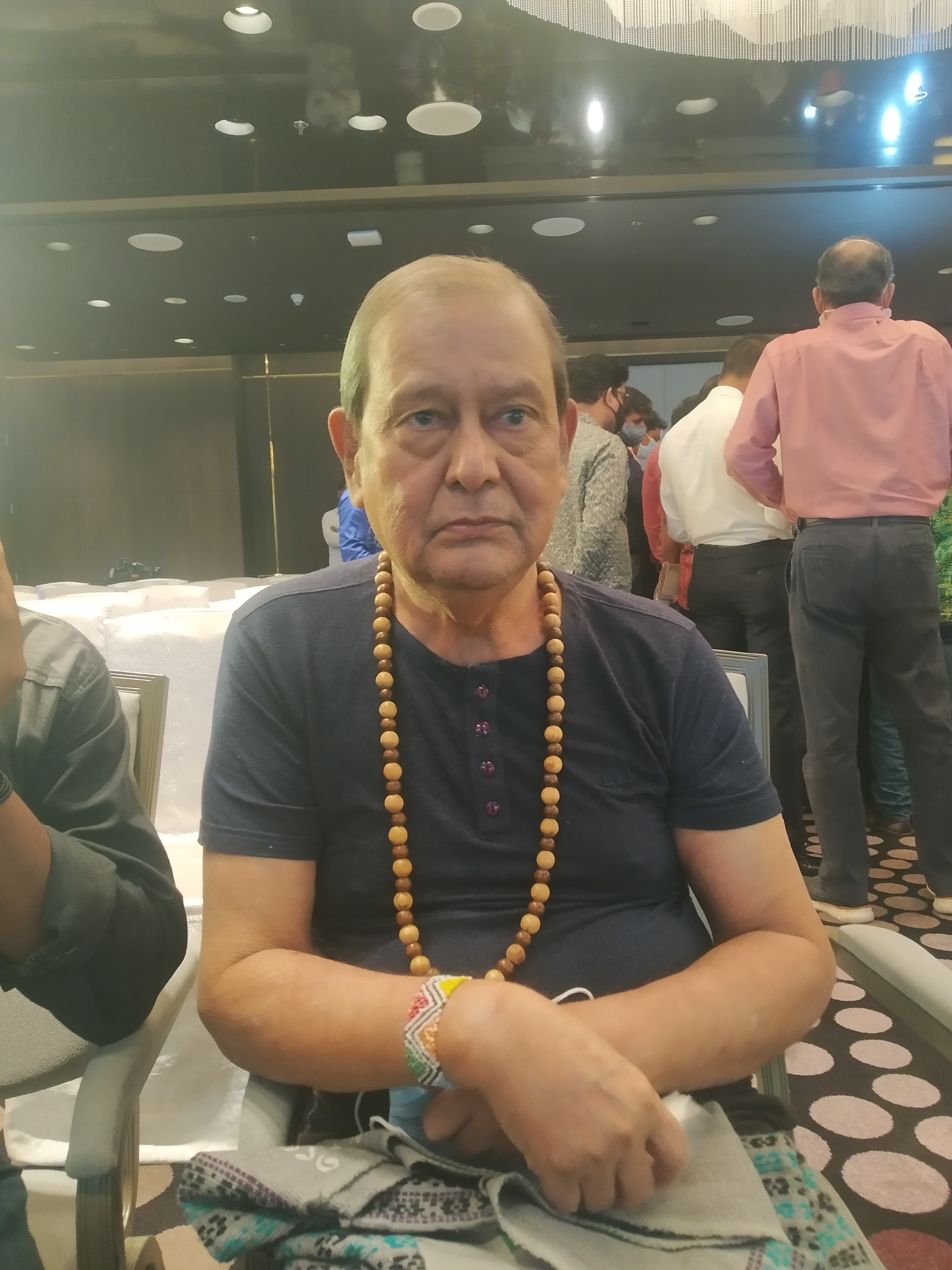
Hafiz in 2021
