= Netrokona =

Town and Municipality in Mymensingh Division, Bangladesh

Netrokona নেত্রকোনা
- Town and Municipality
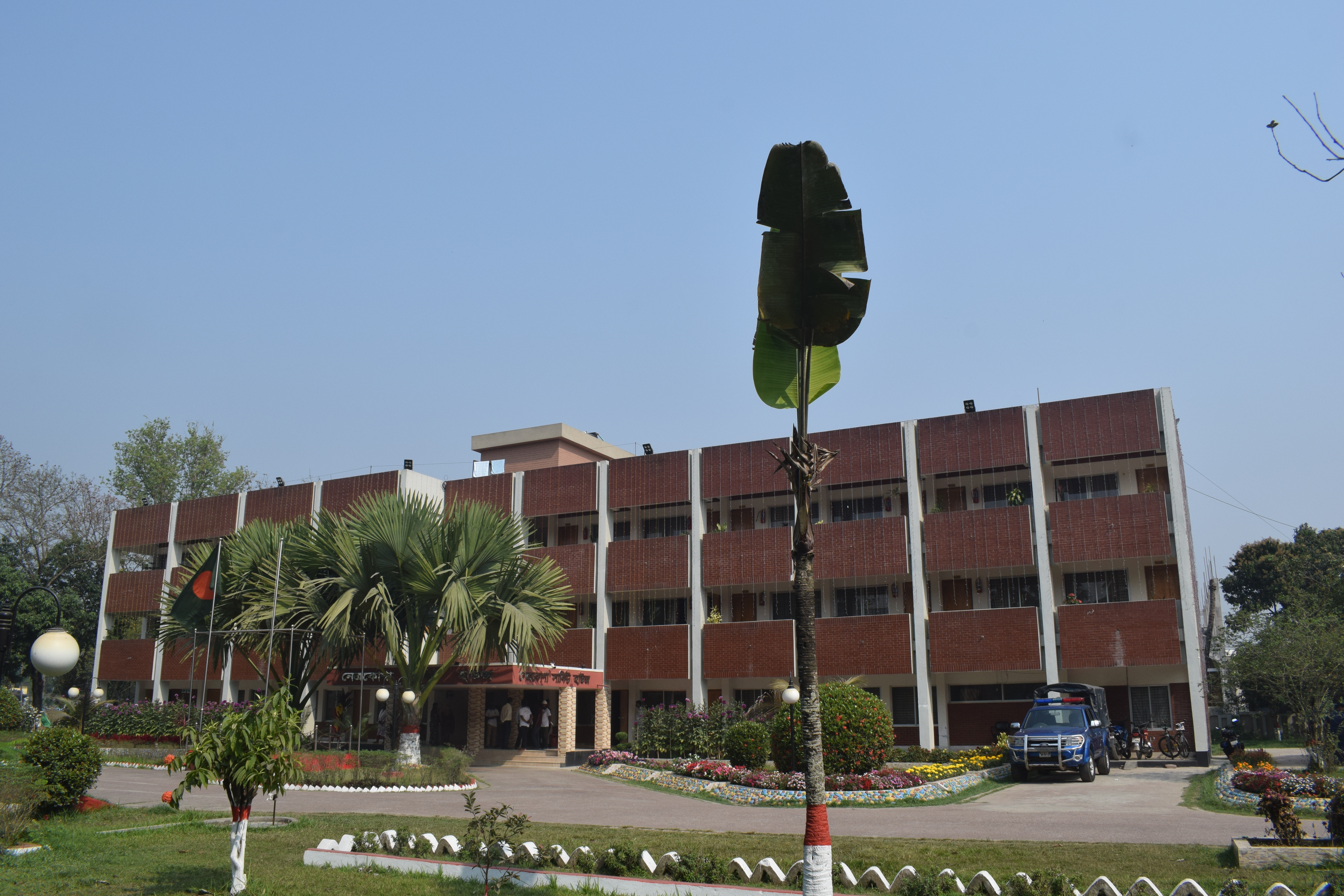
- Circuit House, Netrokona

- Location of Netrokona town in Bangladesh Netrokona (Bangladesh)
- Coordinates: 24.881874°N 90.727490°E
- Country: Bangladesh
- Division: Mymensingh
- District: Netrokona
- Upazila: Netrokona Sadar

Government
  - Type: Municipality
  - Body: Netrokona Municipality
  - Paura Mayor: Md. Nazrul Islam Khan

Area
  - Town and Municipality: 32 km^{2} (12 sq mi)
  - Urban: 36 km^{2} (14 sq mi)

Population (2022)
  - Town and Municipality: 122,299
  - Density: 3,907/km^{2} (10,120/sq mi)
- Time zone: UTC+6 (BST)
- National calling code: +880

Netrokona (Bengali: নেত্রকোনা) is a major town and the district headquarters of Netrokona District in Mymensingh Division. It is the largest town and urban centre of Netrokona District.

== Demographics ==
Religions in Netrokona city (2022)
Religion	Percent
Islam	65.22%
Hinduism	34.74%
Other or not stated	0.04%

According to the 2022 Bangladesh census, Netrokona Paurashava had 28,373 households and a population of 122,299. Netrokona had a literacy rate of 84.55%: 86.58% for males and 82.50% for females, and a sex ratio of 101.43 males per 100 females. 8.54% of the population was under 5 years of age.

According to the 2011 Bangladesh census, Netrokona city had 19,627 households and a population of 91,936. 18,947 (20.61%) were under 10 years of age. Netrokona had a literacy rate (age 7 and over) of 67.08%, compared to the national average of 51.8%, and a sex ratio of 960 females per 1000 males.

== Education ==
There are 11 secondary schools in the town. Anjuman Model Government High School, founded in 1914, and Netrokona Government Girls High School (1937) are the only two public ones. Datta High School, founded in 1889, is a notable private one.
