= Kayser Kamal =

Deputy Speaker of the Jatiya Sangsad (since 2026)

- কায়সার কামাল
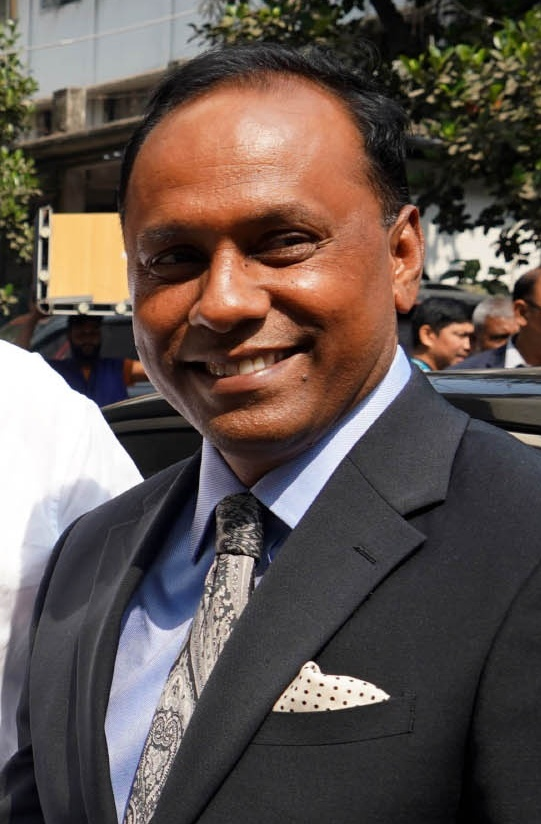
- Kamal in 2026

14th Deputy Speaker of the Jatiya Sangsad
- Incumbent
- Assumed office 12 March 2026
- Speaker: Hafiz Uddin Ahmad
- Preceded by: Shamsul Hoque Tuku

Member of Parliament
- Incumbent
- Assumed office 17 February 2026
- Preceded by: Mustaque Ahmed Ruhi
- Constituency: Netrokona-1

Acting Speaker of the Jatiya Sangsad
- In office 24 July 2026 – 21 August 2026
- Prime Minister: Tarique Rahman
- Preceded by: Hafiz Uddin Ahmad
- Succeeded by: Hafiz Uddin Ahmad

Minister of State for Land
- In office 17 February 2026 – 12 March 2026
- Prime Minister: Tarique Rahman
- Preceded by: Saifuzzaman Chowdhury
- Succeeded by: Mir Mohammed Helal Uddin

Secretary General of the Bangladesh Jatiotabadi Ainjibi Forum
- In office 8 October 2022 – 12 March 2026
- President: A. J. Mohammad Ali; Zainul Abedin
- Preceded by: Mahbub Uddin Khokon
- Succeeded by: Vacant

Personal details
- Born: 31 December 1972 (age 53) Kalmakanda, Netrokona
- Party: Bangladesh Nationalist Party
- Spouse: Kanij Fatema Akonjee
- Children: 2
- Education: Mymensingh Zilla School; Ananda Mohan College
- Alma mater: University of Dhaka; University of Wolverhampton; University of Law
- Occupation: Politician; barrister

Kayser Kamal (born 31 December 1972) commonly known as Barrister Kayser Kamal, is a Bangladeshi politician and barrister serving as the Deputy Speaker of the Jatiya Sangsad. A member of the Bangladesh Nationalist Party (BNP), he has represented the Netrokona-1 constituency as a member of parliament (MP) since 2026. He briefly served as the State Minister of the Ministry of Land in the Tarique ministry before resigning from that post upon taking office as Deputy Speaker.

== Early life and education ==
Kayser kamal was born in Chatrangpur village in Kalmakanda Upazila of Netrokona District, Bangladesh, into an agrarian family. His father Mostafa Kamal Mansur served as a Chairman of Kalmakanda Union Parishad.

Kamal received his primary education from Charangpur Government Primary School. He completed his secondary education at Mymensingh Zilla School for his secondary education in 1987 and his higher secondary studies at Ananda Mohan College in 1989. He subsequently studied history at the University of Dhaka, where he earned BA and MA degrees. In 1998, Kamal moved to the United Kingdom to pursue legal studies. He earned an LLB from the University of Wolverhampton and completed the Bar Vocational Course at the University of Law. He was called to the Bar at Lincoln's Inn in 2005.

== Political career ==
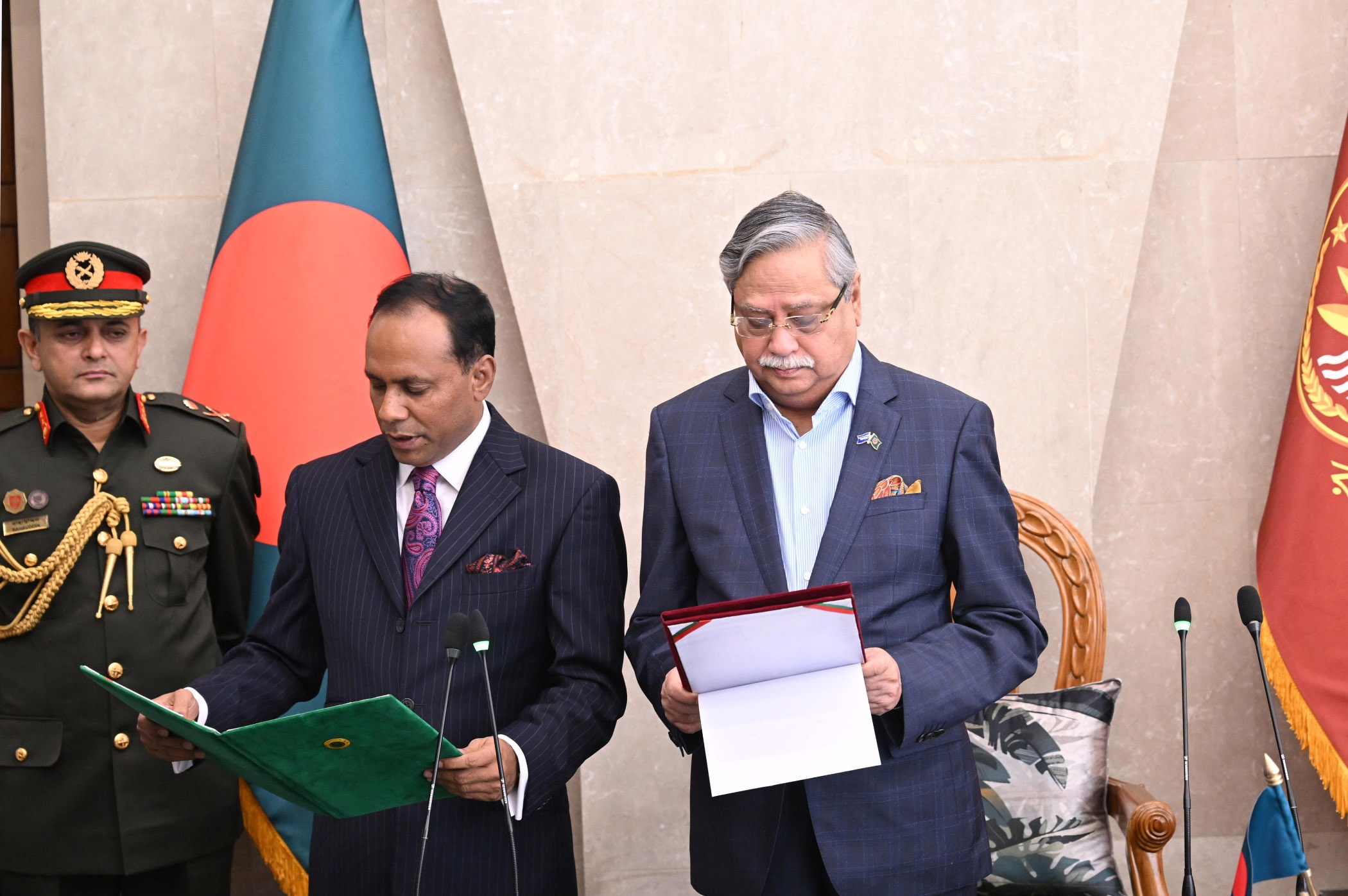
Kamal being sworn in as Deputy Speaker

Kayser Kamal began his political career as a student activist in 1988 with the Bangladesh Jatiotabadi Chatra Dal (JCD). He later became a Central Executive Member of JCD in 1996.

After returning to Bangladesh from the UK in 2006, Kamal joined national politics. In the 2008 Bangladeshi general election, he contested the Netrokona-1 (Durgapur-Kalmakanda) constituency as a candidate of the Bangladesh Nationalist Party (BNP) and received 82,322 votes, losing to Mustaque Ahmed Ruhi of the Bangladesh Awami League. In 2009, he became a Central Executive Member of BNP. Kamal later appointed Legal Affairs Secretary of the party in 2016.

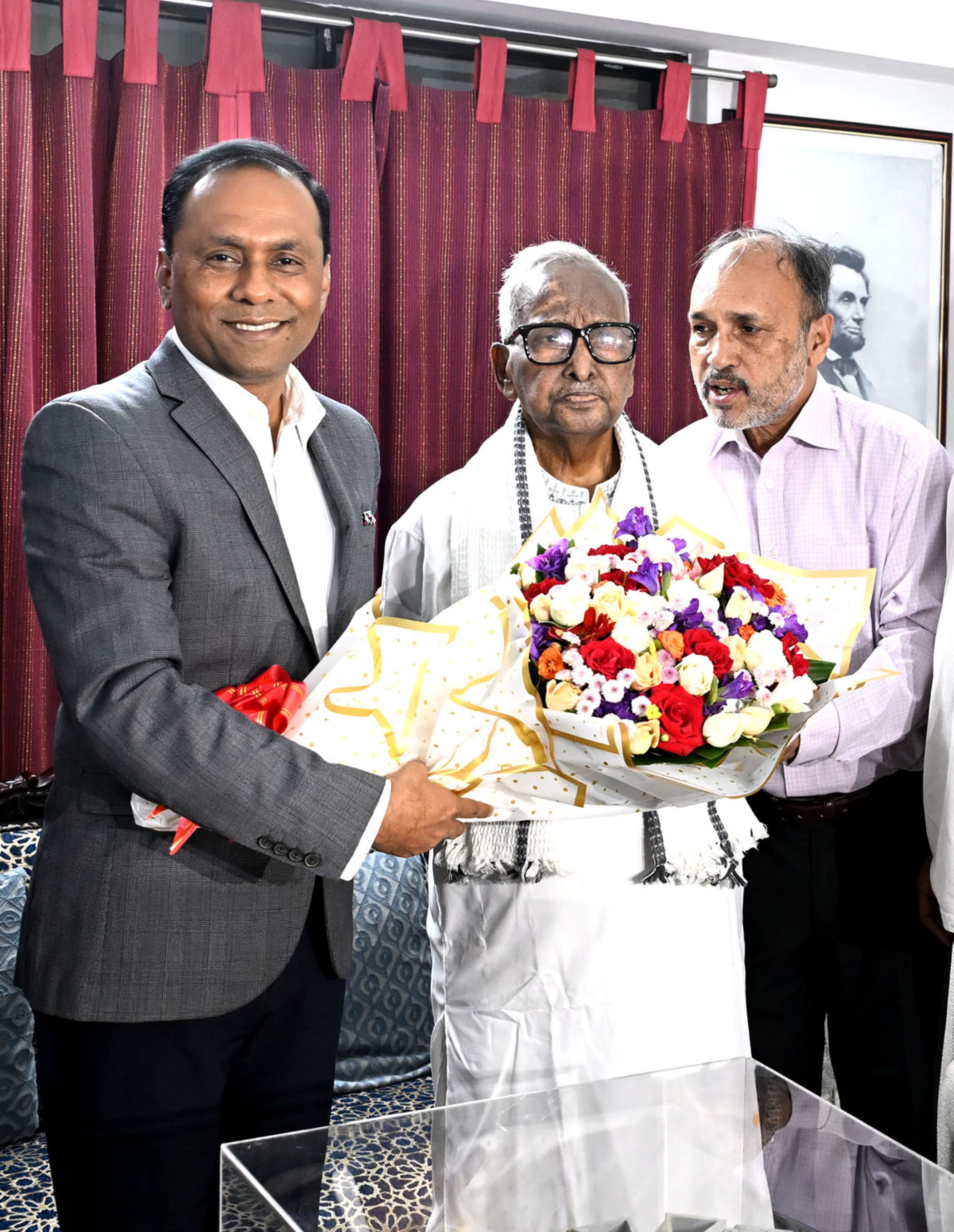
Barrister Kayser Kamal with former President Barrister Jamiruddin Sarkar

In the 2018 Bangladeshi general election, he again nominated by BNP and contested the parliamentary election, receiving 16,332 votes and losing to Manu Majumdar of Awami League. In 2021, he became a member of Foreign Affairs Committee of BNP. Kamal elected as the Secretary General of the Bangladesh Jatiotabadi Ainjibi Forum in 2022, an association of lawyers allied with BNP.

In the 2026 Bangladeshi general election, he was elected as the Member of Parliament for Netrokona-1, Golam Rabbani of Khelafat Majlis with 158,343 votes to 87,488. He was subsequently appointed State Minister of the Ministry of Land in the Tarique ministry.

On 12 March 2026, he was elected Deputy Speaker of the 13th Jatiya Sangsad. Following his election, Kaysar Kamal, then the legal affairs secretary of the Bangladesh Nationalist Party National Executive Committee, submitted his resignation to the party chairman, stepping down from all party and ministerial positions to maintain neutrality in his role as Deputy Speaker.

== Electoral history ==
Year	Constituency	Party	Votes	%	Result
2008	Netrokona-1	Bangladesh Nationalist Party	82,322	37.50	Lost
2018	Netrokona-1	Bangladesh Nationalist Party	16,332	6.00	Lost
2026	Netrokona-1	Bangladesh Nationalist Party	158,343	64.40	Won
