= Rashmoni Hajong =

Hajong anti-colonial revolutionary

- রাসিমণি হাজং
- Born: 1901; Netrakona, Bengal Presidency, British Raj
- Died: 31 January 1946 (aged 44–45); Durgapur Upazila Netrakona, Bengal Presidency, British India (present-day Bangladesh)
- Cause of death: Shot by Indian Imperial Police
- Monuments: Hajong Mata Rashmoni Monument
- Organization: Krishak Samiti
- Movement: Tanka movement Indian independence movement

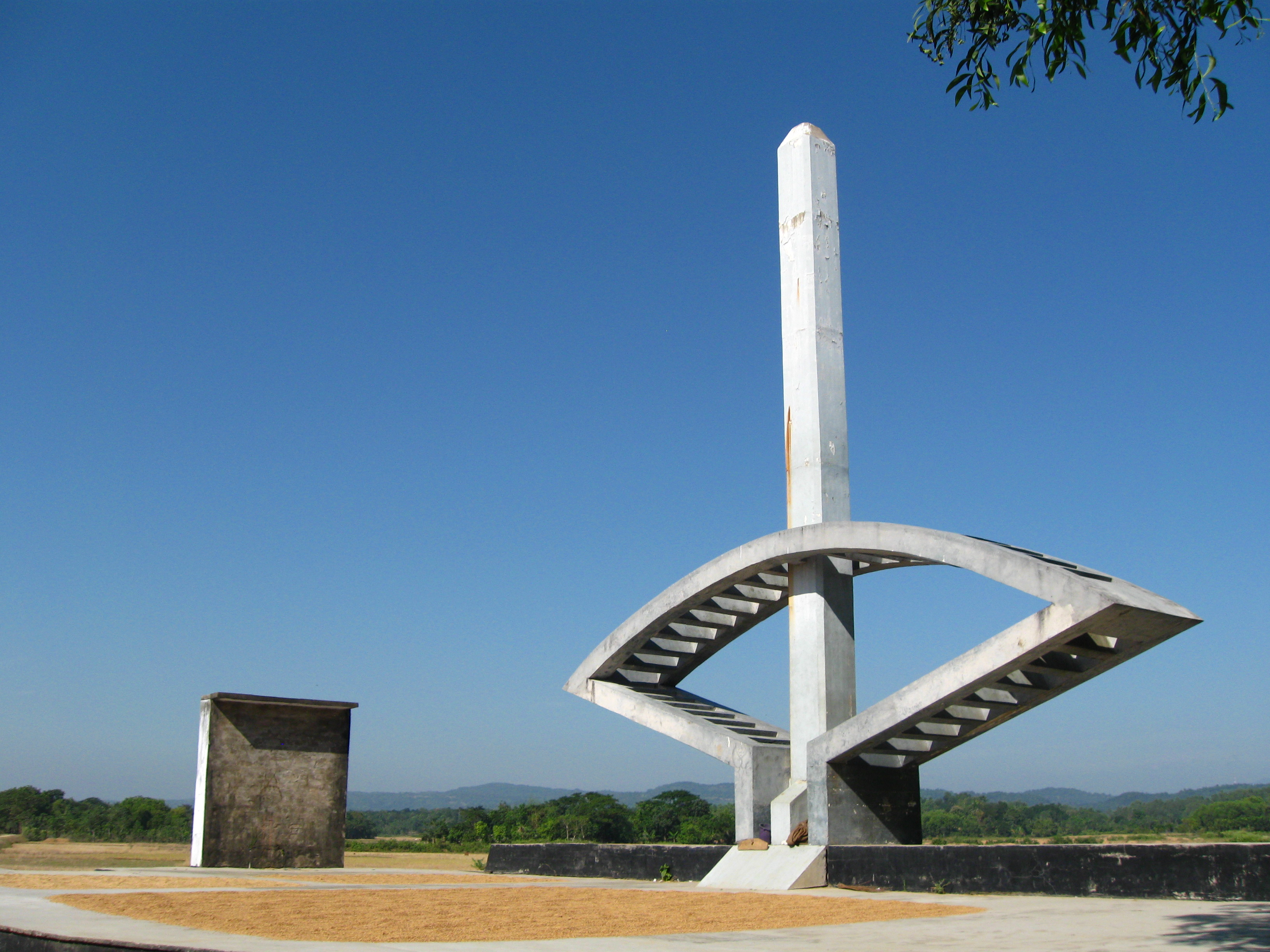
Hajong Mata Rashmoni Monument

Rashimoni Hajong (Bengali: রাসিমণি হাজং; 1901 – 31 January 1946) was one of the prominent revolutionary Hajong leaders of the Tanka Movement in Mymensingh, which took place in 1946. She was the first martyr of the movement. Alongside Moni Singh, the leader of the Tanka Movement, Rashimoni's contributions are deeply remembered. There is a monument built in her memory located in the Netrokona District.

== Early life ==
In 1901, Rashimoni Hajong was born in Baheratali village, located within the Kullagara Union of Durgapur Upazila, in the present-day Netrokona District, Mymensingh Division.

== Career ==
Rashimoni directly participated in the anti-Tanka system and Indian independence movement. She was a revolutionary member of the Peasant Association (Krishak Samiti). In 1946, a student was killed when police fired upon a procession in Mymensingh town held on the occasion of the first anniversary of Vietnam's Independence Day. As a result, intense protests erupted across the entire Mymensingh District. In this context, an Indian Imperial Police raid created panic in Baheratali village. The Indian Imperial Police were attempting to forcibly take newly married Kumudini Hajong to the Durgapur army barrack, as they did not find Lonkshwer Hajong, her revolutionary husband. The workers of the village Peasant Association were returning from a public rally in Durgapur at that time. Among them was Rashimoni. Determined to rescue the helpless Kumudini Hajong, she began hacking at the police with the large indigenous sickle (দা) in her hand. The police then opened fire. Rashimoni and another worker named Surendranath were killed in the shooting. Upon hearing this news, hundreds of peasants from all directions surrounded and attacked the police. Two policemen were killed in the clash, and the others fled.

== Events of the day of death ==
While trying to save a peasant housewife named Saraswati from the military suppressing the peasant rebellion in the Hajong area, she severed a soldier's head from his body with a single stroke of her sickle (দা). Rashimoni was subsequently martyred by the gunfire of another soldier. Along the banks of the Someshwari River, Shangkhamoni, Rebati, Nilmoni, Padmamoni, and many others were also martyred the rebellion. Along the banks of the Someshwari River, Shangkhamoni, Rebati, Nilmoni, Padmamoni, and many others were also martyred in the rebellion. Chief Minister of West Bengal Jyoti Basu and Barrister Snehansu Kanta Acharya visited the Hajong-populated villages in the Garo Hills region to conduct an on-the-spot investigation of the incident in Baheratali village. However, Bastin, the District Magistrate of Mymensingh, did not allow them to enter Baheratali village.
