= Md. Anwarul Haque (Bangladeshi politician) =

Bangladeshi politician

- মোঃ আনোয়ারুল হক

Member of the Bangladesh Parliament for Netrokona-2
- Incumbent
- Assumed office 17 February 2026
- Preceded by: Ashraf Ali Khan Khasru

Personal details
- Born: 1 April 1967 (age 59) Netrokona Sadar Upazila, Netrokona District
- Party: Bangladesh Nationalist Party

Md. Anwarul Haque is a Bangladeshi politician of the Bangladesh Nationalist Party. He is currently serving as a member of parliament from Netrokona-2 .

== Early life ==
Haque was born on 1 April 1967 at Netrokona Sadar Upazila under Netrokona District.
