= Durgapur Free Day =

Annual celebration of the December 6, 1971 capture of Durgapur

Durgapur Free Day দুর্গাপুর মুক্ত দিবস
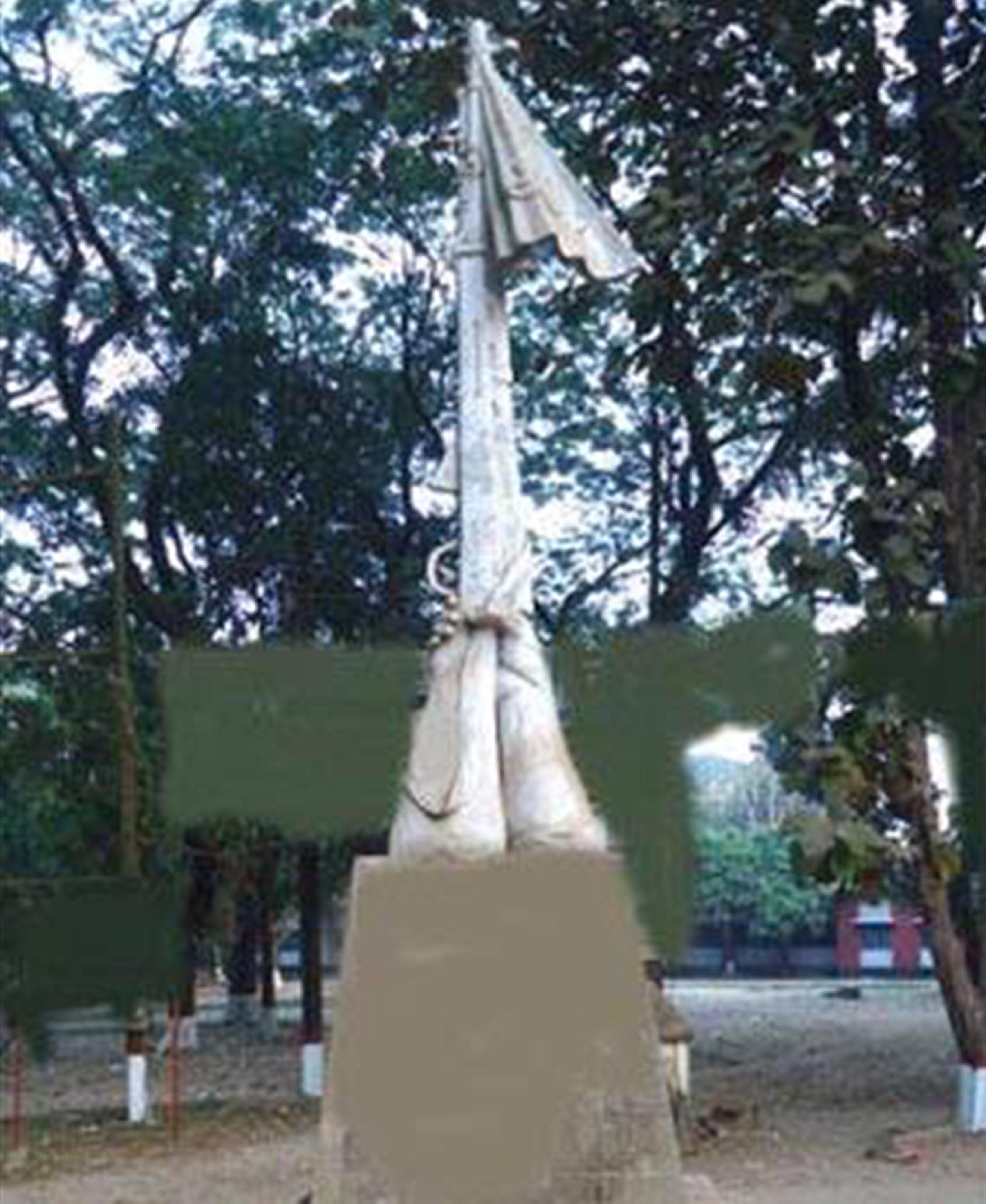
- Liberation War Memorial Sculpture by Mahmudul hasan shohag
- Official name: Bengali: দুর্গাপুর মুক্ত দিবস (Durgapur Free Day)
- Observed by: Bangladesh
- Type: National
- Celebrations: entertainment and cultural programs
- Date: 6 December
- Next time: 6 December 2026
- Frequency: Annual
- Related to: Durgapur Free Day of Bangladesh

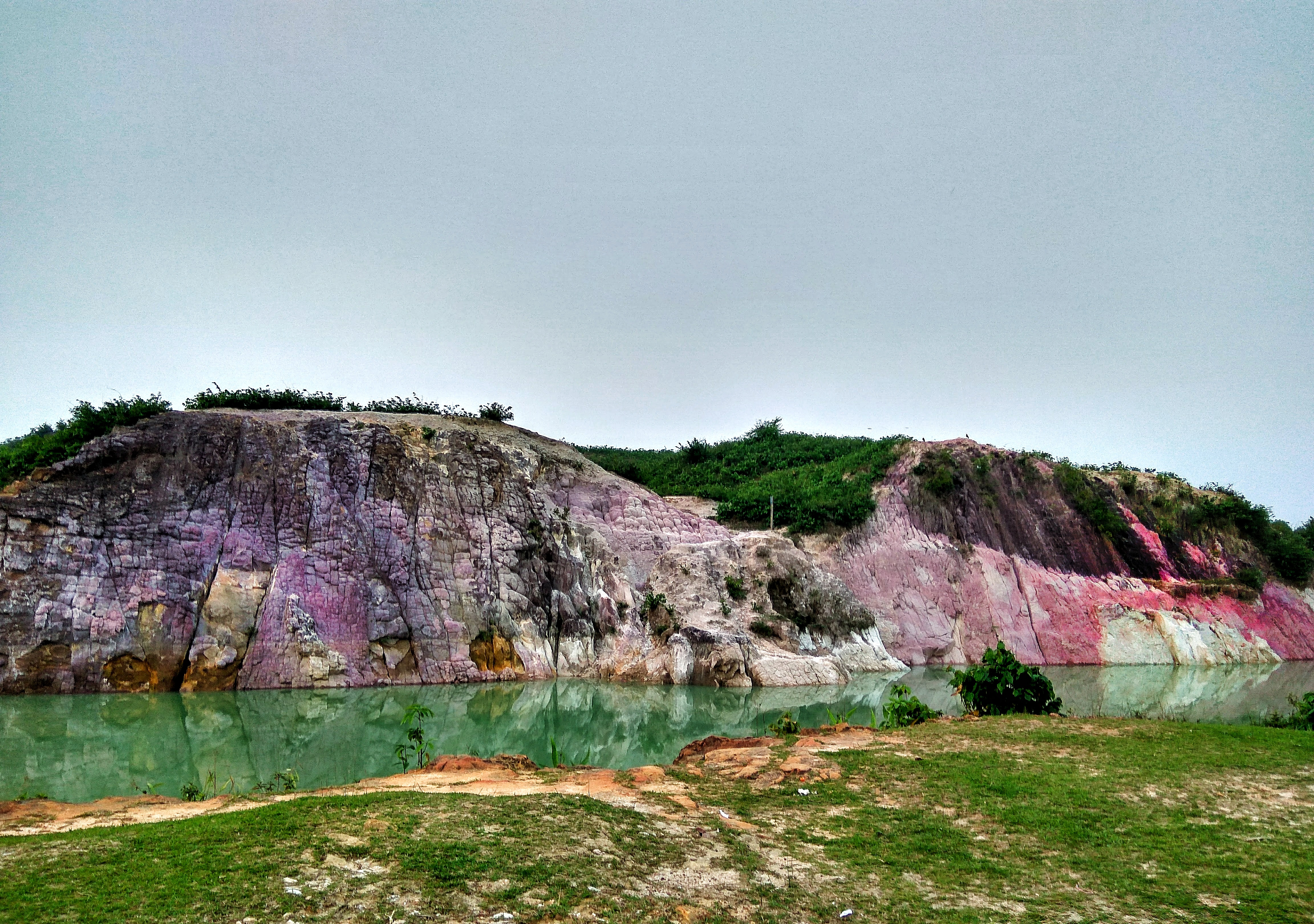

On this day in 1971, the locals in collaboration with Indian allies, captured Durgapur on the border of Netrokona in a bloody battle.

== History ==
During the Bangladesh War of Independence, a strong Pakistan army base was established at Birishiri in the missionary area of Durgapur under the leadership of Major Sultan of the Pakistani forces. Positioned here, the Pakistan army, with the help of Bengali brokers, Al-Badr and Razakars, controlled the Durgapur Sadar, the border areas of Kalmakanda, Lengura, Nazirpur and Vijaypur in Durgapur. At the same time, people were killed in the slaughterhouse of Birishiri in the dark of night.

== Martyrs ==
Among those killed first were professor of Philosophy of Netrakona Govt. College Professor Aroz Ali, former headmaster Ashutosh Sanyal, MKCM Pilot Government High School headmaster Abdul Awal, Durgapur MNA Purakandulia Union resident Gouranga Chandra Saha, Kullagarh Union chairman Ali Hossain.

=== Other events ===
Durgapur Upazila Fighter Commander Ruhul Amin Chunnu said that on May 4, 1971, two Pakistani soldiers went to Gaokandia village and tried to rape a woman but the villagers led by Chhotuni hacked them to death. Due to this, on 5 May, a group of Pakistan army from Birishiri Cantonment went to Gaokandia village and killed 19 villagers including common people by entering a house and shooting and burning them. Besides, Dildar Hossain, a student of Susang Degree College, Imam Hossain, a farmer, Billal Hossain and many others were killed.

He further said that Santosh Biswas, a pro-independence commander, was shot dead by Pakistanis while coming forward after killing 10 Pakistani soldiers in a brushfire of the Mukti Bahini near Vijaypur. Shaheed Santosh Park was built in Durgapur Sadar after his name. Sudhir Hajong and Abdul Jabbar were two more martyrs in the war of independence at Durgapur.

== Liberation War Memorial Sculpture ==
Liberation War Memorial Sculpture (Bengali: মুক্তিযুদ্ধের স্মৃতি ভাস্কর্য) is a sculpture made by Mahmudul Hasan Shohag in 2010. It is (15 feet) high and is located in Durgapur.

The sculpture tribute to Bangladeshi Fighters who sacrificed their lives during the war.
