= Liberation War Memorial Sculpture, Durgapur =

Sculpture in Durgapur, Bangladesh

Liberation War Memorial Sculpture
- Bengali: মুক্তিযুদ্ধের স্মৃতি ভাস্কর্য
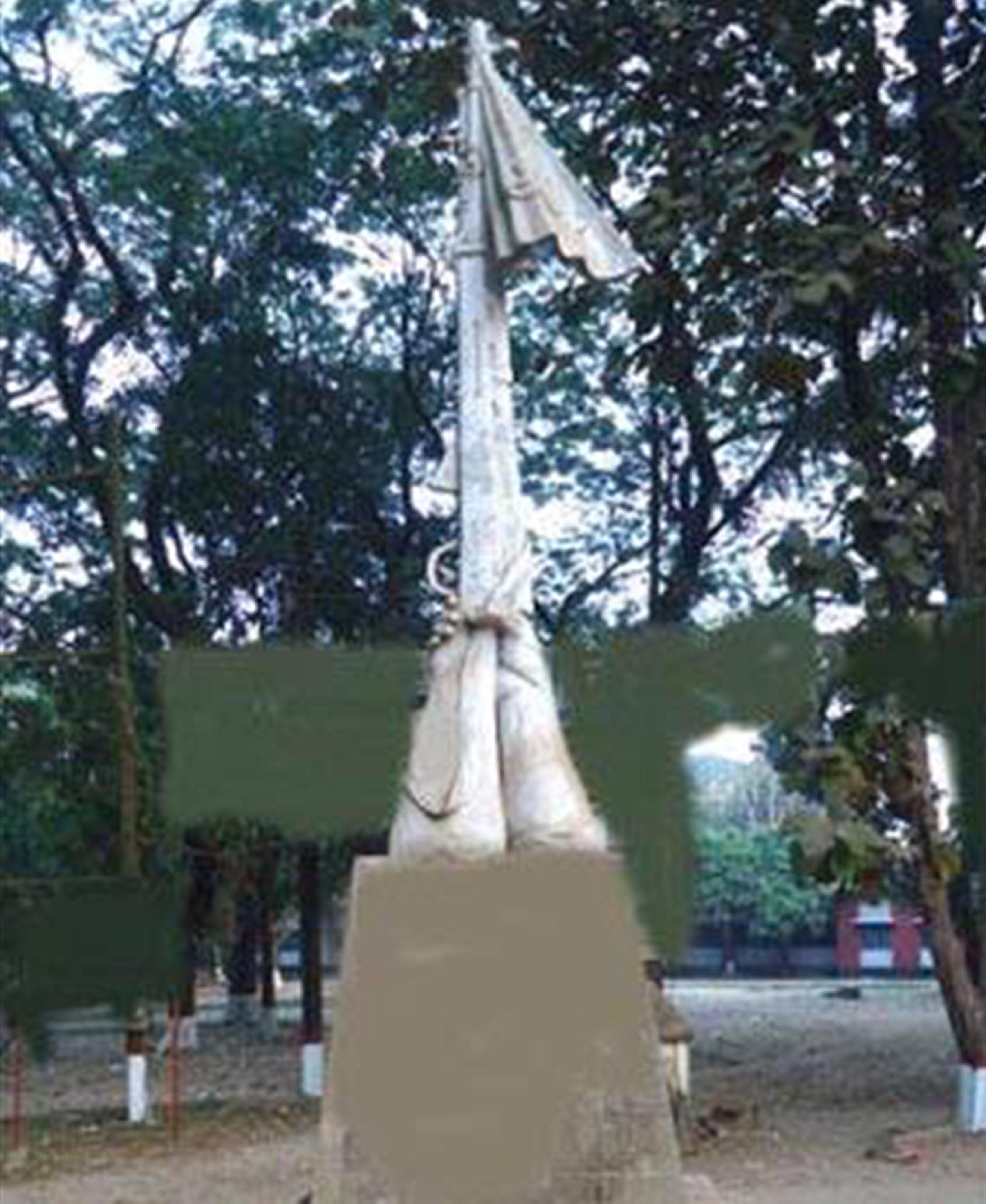
- Liberation War Memorial Sculpture
- Artist: Mahmudul Hasan Shohag
- Completion date: 2010
- Medium: concrete casting
- Location: Durgapur, Bangladesh

The Liberation War Memorial Sculpture (Bengali: মুক্তিযুদ্ধের স্মৃতি ভাস্কর্য) was made by Mahmudul Hasan Shohag in 2010. It is 15 feet high and is located in Durgapur, Bangladesh.

The sculpture is a tribute to Bangladeshi fighters who died during the Liberation War.

== See also ==
- Durgapur Free Day
