= Zubed Ali =

Bangladeshi politician (1930–2022)

Member of Parliament for Mymensingh-24
- In office 1973–1976
- Preceded by: Seats start
- Succeeded by: Mujibur Rahman

Member of Parliament for Netrokona-4
- In office 1986–1988
- Preceded by: Seats start
- Succeeded by: Ali Osman Khan

Member of Parliament for Netrokona-3
- In office 1991 – February 1996
- Preceded by: Ashraf Uddin Khan
- Succeeded by: Nurul Amin Talukdar

Personal details
- Born: 25 December 1930
- Died: 30 April 2022 (aged 91)
- Party: Bangladesh Awami League

Zubed Ali (25 December 1930 – 30 April 2022) is a Bangladesh Awami League politician and a former member of parliament for the former Mymensingh-24, Netrokona-4 and Netrokona-3.

== Career ==
Ali was elected to parliament from Mymensingh-24 as a Bangladesh Awami League candidate in 1973. He was elected to parliament from Netrokona-4 as a Bangladesh Awami League candidate in 1986. He was elected to parliament from Netrokona-3 as a Bangladesh Awami League candidate in 1991. He lost the June 1996 and 2001 elections.
