= Netrokona-2 =

Constituency of Bangladesh's Jatiya Sangsad

Coordinates: 24.87°N 90.73°E

- Constituency for the Jatiya Sangsad
- District: Netrokona District
- Division: Mymensingh Division
- Electorate: 396,255 (2018)

Current constituency
- Created: 1984
- Party: Bangladesh Nationalist Party
- Member: Md. Anwarul Haque
- ← 157 Netrokona-1 159 Netrokona-3 →

Netrokona-2 is a constituency represented in the Jatiya Sangsad (National Parliament) of Bangladesh since 2026 by Md. Anwarul Haque of the Bangladesh Nationalist Party.

== Boundaries ==
The constituency encompasses Barhatta and Netrokona Sadar upazilas.

== History ==
The constituency was created in 1984 from a Mymensingh constituency when the former Mymensingh District was split into four districts: Mymensingh, Sherpur, Netrokona, and Kishoreganj.

Ahead of the 2014 general election, the Election Commission expanded the boundaries of the constituency. Previously it had excluded one union parishad of Netrokona Sadar Upazila: Maugati.

== Members of Parliament ==
Election	Member	Party
1986	Jalal Uddin Talukder	Awami League
1988	Golam Rabbani	Jatiya Party
1991	Abu Abbas	Bangladesh Nationalist Party
1996	Fazlur Rahman Khan	Awami League
2001	Abdul Momin	Awami League
2004 by-election	Abu Abbas	Bangladesh Nationalist Party
2008	Ashraf Ali Khan Khasru	Awami League
2014	Arif Khan Joy	Awami League
2018	Ashraf Ali Khan Khasru	Awami League
2026	Md. Anwarul Haque	Bangladesh Nationalist Party

== Elections ==
=== Elections in the 2010s ===
General Election 2014: Netrokona-2
Party	Candidate	Votes	%	±%
AL	Arif Khan Joy	89,128	77.0	+10.6
Independent	Abdun Nur Khan	26,153	22.6	N/A
Jatiya Party (M)	Md. Ayub Ali	484	0.4	N/A
Majority		62,975	54.4	+20.2
Turnout		115,765	33.7	−50.4
AL hold				

=== Elections in the 2000s ===
General Election 2008: Netrokona-2
Party	Candidate	Votes	%	±%
AL	Ashraf Ali Khan Khoshru	164,076	66.4	
BNP	Ashraf Uddin Khan	79,572	32.2	
JP(E)	Fakir Ashraf	1,652	0.7	
Independent	Mohammad Zafrullah Khan	1,069	0.4	
Independent	Noyan Datta	842	0.3	
Majority		84,504	34.2	
Turnout		247,211	84.1	
AL gain from BNP				

Abdul Momin died in July 2004. Abu Abbas of the BNP was elected in an October 2004 by-election.

General Election 2001: Netrokona-2
Party	Candidate	Votes	%	±%
AL	Abdul Momin	108,514	48.1	+2.2
BNP	Abu Abbas	101,320	44.9	+13.2
IJOF	Mostafizur Rahman	13,073	5.8	N/A
Jatiya Party (M)	Monoranjan Singh	1,883	0.8	N/A
BKA	Abdur Raqib	691	0.3	−0.3
Majority		7,194	3.2	−11.0
Turnout		225,481	77.4	+3.7
AL hold				

=== Elections in the 1990s ===
General Election June 1996: Netrokona-2
Party	Candidate	Votes	%	±%
AL	Fazlur Rahman Khan	75,595	45.9	+11.7
BNP	Abu Abbas	52,253	31.7	−8.0
JP(E)	Fakir Asraf	30,869	18.7	+5.0
Jamaat	Md. Emamul Haque	3,933	2.4	N/A
BKA	Mohammad Zafrullah Khan	1,011	0.6	−0.2
Zaker Party	Nawab Gazi	475	0.3	0.0
Gano Forum	K. M. Fazlul Kader	364	0.2	N/A
Independent	Mohammad Anwarul Islam	146	0.1	N/A
NAP (Bhashani)	AKM Mozammel Haque	85	0.1	N/A
Majority		23,342	14.2	+8.7
Turnout		164,731	73.7	+21.6
AL gain from BNP				

General Election 1991: Netrokona-2
Party	Candidate	Votes	%	±%
BNP	Abu Abbas	47,191	39.7	
AL	Fazlur Rahman Khan	40,604	34.2	
JP(E)	Ashraf Uddin Khan	16,344	13.7	
Independent	S. M. Fazlul Kader	7,078	6.0	
Ganatantri Party	Azizul Islam Khan	4,594	3.9	
Independent	Nirmalendu Gun Chowdhury	1,249	1.1	
BKA	Mohammad Zafrullah Khan	919	0.8	
Jatiya Samajtantrik Dal-JSD	Motalib Khan Pathan	604	0.5	
Zaker Party	Fazlul Haq	305	0.3	
Majority		6,587	5.5	
Turnout		118,888	52.1	
BNP gain from				
