= Netrokona-1 =

Constituency of Bangladesh's Jatiya Sangsad

Coordinates: 25.08°N 90.89°E

- Constituency for the Jatiya Sangsad
- District: Netrokona District
- Division: Mymensingh Division
- Electorate: 353,206 (2018)

Current constituency
- Created: 1984
- Party: Bangladesh Nationalist Party
- Member: Kayser Kamal
- ← 156 Mymensingh-11 158 Netrokona-2 →

Netrokona-1 is a constituency represented in the Jatiya Sangsad (National Parliament) of Bangladesh since 2026 by Kayser Kamal of the Bangladesh Nationalist Party.

== Boundaries ==
The constituency encompasses Durgapur and Kalmakanda upazilas.

== History ==
The constituency was created in 1984 from the Mymensingh-12 constituency when the former Mymensingh District was split into four districts: Mymensingh, Sherpur, Netrokona, and Kishoreganj.

Ahead of the 2008 general election, the Election Commission redrew constituency boundaries to reflect population changes revealed by the 2001 Bangladesh census. The 2008 redistricting altered the boundaries of the constituency.

== Members of Parliament ==
Election	Member	Party
1986	Sirajul Islam	Awami League
1988	Sirajul Islam	Jatiya Party
1991	Abdul Karim Abbasi	Bangladesh Nationalist Party
1996	Jalal Uddin Talukder	Awami League
2001	Abdul Karim Abbasi	Bangladesh Nationalist Party
2008	Mustaque Ahmed Ruhi	Awami League
2014	Chobi Biswas	Awami League
2018	Manu Majumdar	Awami League
2024	Mustaque Ahmed Ruhi	Awami League
2026	Kayser Kamal	Bangladesh Nationalist Party

== Elections ==
=== Elections in the 2010s ===
General Election 2014: Netrokona-1
Party	Candidate	Votes	%	±%
AL	Chobi Biswas	53,496	51.3	−9.2
Independent	Shah Kutub Uddin Talukdar	31,710	30.4	N/A
Independent	Mustaque Ahmed Ruhi	17,665	16.9	N/A
JP(E)	Md. Anowar Hossain Khan	1,381	1.3	N/A
Majority		21,786	20.9	−2.2
Turnout		104,252	34.7	−48.1
AL hold				

=== Elections in the 2000s ===
General Election 2008: Netrokona-1
Party	Candidate	Votes	%	±%
AL	Mustaque Ahmed Ruhi	132,977	60.5	+14.8
BNP	Kayser Kamal	82,322	37.5	−14.8
CPB	Md. Siddiqur Rahman	4,355	2.0	+0.2
Majority		50,655	23.1	+16.5
Turnout		219,654	82.8	+4.6
AL gain from BNP				

General Election 2001: Netrokona-1
Party	Candidate	Votes	%	±%
BNP	Abdul Karim Abbasi	103,059	52.3	+15.4
AL	Jalal Uddin Talukder	90,031	45.7	+5.7
CPB	Dibalok Singha	3,493	1.8	+0.6
KSJL	A. K. Azad	455	0.2	N/A
Majority		13,028	6.6	+3.5
Turnout		197,038	78.2	+4.0
BNP gain from AL				

=== Elections in the 1990s ===
General Election June 1996: Netrokona-1
Party	Candidate	Votes	%	±%
AL	Jalal Uddin Talukder	59,574	40.0	+3.1
BNP	Abdul Karim Abbasi	55,027	36.9	−0.4
JP(E)	Golam Rabbani	29,115	19.5	−2.2
Jamaat	Abdul Kadir	2,772	1.9	N/A
CPB	Dibalok Singha	1,728	1.2	−2.6
Islami Shasantantra Andolon	Mohammad Shamsul Huda	592	0.4	N/A
Zaker Party	Ebadat Ali	265	0.2	−0.1
Majority		4,547	3.1	+2.7
Turnout		149,073	74.2	+25.3
AL gain from BNP				

General Election 1991: Netrokona-1
Party	Candidate	Votes	%	±%
BNP	Abdul Karim Abbasi	38,437	37.3	
AL	Jalal Uddin Talukder	38,023	36.9	
JP(E)	Golam Rabbani	22,396	21.7	
CPB	Chobi Biswas	3,918	3.8	
Zaker Party	Ebadat Ali	337	0.3	
Majority		414	0.4	
Turnout		103,111	48.9	
BNP gain from				
