= Rangchhati Union =

Rangchhati Union রংছাতি
- Union Council
- Location in Bangladesh
- Coordinates: 25.1353°N 90.9133°E
- Country: Bangladesh
- Division: Mymensingh Division
- District: Netrokona District
- Upazila: Kalmakanda Upazila

Government
  - Chairman: Anisur Rahman Pathan Babul

Area
  - Total: 56.76 km^{2} (21.92 sq mi)

Population (2011)
  - Total: 41,363
  - Density: 728.7/km^{2} (1,887/sq mi)
- Time zone: UTC+6 (BST)
- Postal code: 2430
- Website: rongchatiup.netrokona.gov.bd

Rangchhati Union (Bengali: রংছাতি ইউনিয়ন) is a union parishad of Kalmakanda Upazila in Netrakona District.

== Geography ==
Rangchhati Union is located at 25.1353°N 90.9133°E. Its total area is 14,025 acres (56.76 km^{2}).

== Demographics ==
According to the 2011 Bangladesh census, Rangchhati Union had a population of 41,363. Males constituted 48.9% of the population and females 51.1%.

== Administration ==
Rangchhati has 9 wards and 53 villages. List of ward based villages:—

Wards	Name of Villages
No 1	Nalla Para, Daiarakanda, Rajnagar, Baluchanda, Amgara, Saterahati, Pulia, Paneshwar Para, Hasa Noagaon, Bholapara, Baniakuna, Shantinagar, Burimara
No 2	Manipurpara, Omargaon, Harinakuri, Kaliakandi
No 3	Munshipur, Mangara, Nayagaon, Shalikabam, Chuta Mongara, Baramanghar
No 4	Rangchhati, Marakhla, Bastapur, Mautala
No 5	Sanyasi Para, Jagir Para, Betgara, Hatiber, Chandradinga
No 6	Rajabari, Chikantup, Bangkona, Patlaban, Battala, Kanda Para
No 7	Teratopa, Baghber, Sinkata
No 8	Chaita, Krishnapur, Batania Para, Panchgaon, Naklai
No 9	Chita Naya, Ramnathpur, Bisauti, Raypur, Barakanda, Gozariakanda, Jangalbari

== Education system ==
According to the 2011 Bangladesh census, Rangchhati Union had a literacy rate of 29.7%. At this time, there are 3 secondary schools, 1 lower secondary School, 18 government primary schools, 1 alia madrasa, 4 ibtadei madrasas and renowned non-government organization BRAC's primary schools in the union. There are also other NGO primary schools and qawmi madrasas.

== Educational institutions ==
- Secondary School
  - Munshipur Haji Israil Islami High School
  - Rangchhati Dwimukhi High School
  - Baruakona Saint Fradaric High School
  - Bottola High School
- Alia Madrasa
  - Rangchhati Dakhil Madrasa
- Govt Primary School
  - Munshipur Govt Primary School
  - South Munshipur Govt Primary School
  - Kalaikandi Govt Primary School
  - Omorgaon Govt Primary School
  - Omorgaon Shahjahan Govt Primary School
  - Rangchhati Govt Primary School
  - Amgara Govt Primary School
  - Khushikura Govt Primary School
  - Choita Govt Primary School
  - Bishauti Govt Primary School
  - Ramnathpur Govt Primary School
  - Baruakona Govt Primary School
  - Bottola Govt Primary School
  - Garampara Govt Primary School
  - Shahid Smriti Teratoopa Baghber Govt Primary School
  - Krisnopur Govt Primary School
  - Nollapara Community Govt Primary School
  - Rajnagar Govt Primary School
- Ibtedei Madrasa
  - Pechamari Ibtedei Madrasa
  - Choitanoyapara Ibtedei Madrasa
  - Banaikona Ibtedei Madrasa
  - Nollapara Ibtedei Madrasa
- NGO
  - BRAC & others
- Qawmi Madrasa
  - Munshipur Rajjakiya Hafijia Eyatimkhana Madrasa
  - Munshupur Shahidiya Fayjul Ulum Madrasa
  - Horinakuri Noorani Ideal (Residential) Madrasa
  - Rangchhati Qawmi Madrasa

== Transport ==
From Kalmakanda Upazila, roadway is the main communication system of Rangchhati Union. By the motorcycles & battery operated auto-rickshaws, more than 8 kilometers north from Kalmakanda Upazila, crossing the College Road and Panchgaon Border Road, people can reach Rangchhati Union.

== See more ==
- Durgapur Upazila, Netrokona
- Netrakona
