= Fazlur Rahman Khan (politician) =

Bangladeshi politician

- ফজলুর রহমান খান

Member of Parliament
- In office 14 July 1996 – 13 July 2001
- Preceded by: Abu Abbas
- Succeeded by: Abdul Momin
- Constituency: Netrokona-2
- In office 10 July 1986 – 6 December 1987
- Preceded by: Constituency created
- Succeeded by: Ashraf Uddin Khan
- Constituency: Netrokona-3
- In office 7 April 1973 – 6 Nov 1975
- Preceded by: Constituency created
- Constituency: Mymensingh-23

Personal details
- Died: 26 September 2008 (aged 80) Dhaka, Bangladesh
- Party: Bangladesh Awami League

Fazlur Rahman Khan (died 26 September 2008) was a Bangladesh Awami League politician and a Jatiya Sangsad member representing the Mymensingh-23, Netrokona-2 and Netrokona-3 constituencies.

== Career ==
From 1977 to 2003, he served as the president of Netrokona District unit of the Bangladesh Awami League.
