= Netrokona Sadar Upazila =

Netrokona Sadar নেত্রকোণা সদর
- Upazila
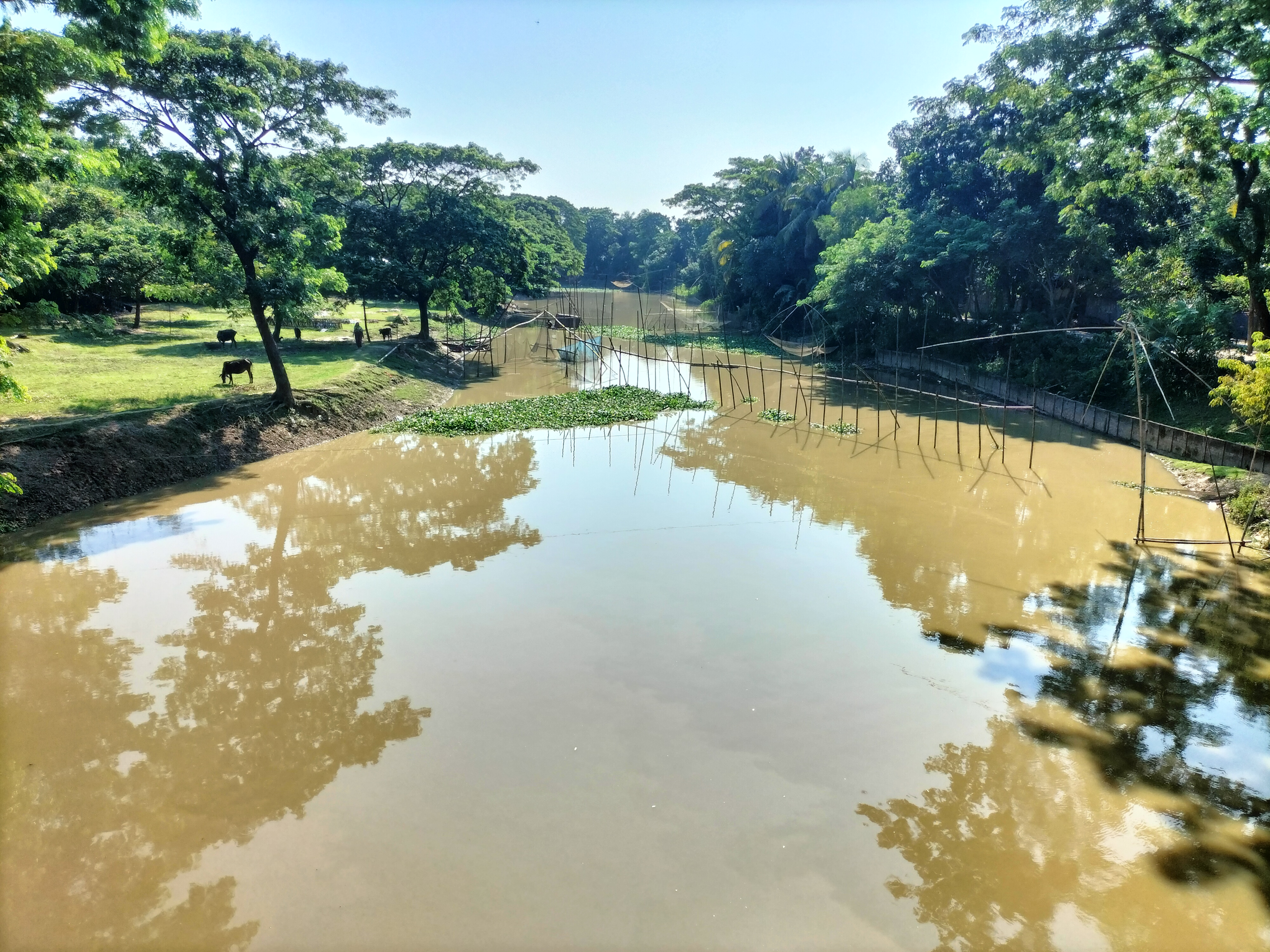
- Horikhali River at Malni

- Coordinates: 24°52.5′N 90°44′E
- Country: Bangladesh
- Division: Mymensingh
- District: Netrokona

Government
  - Upazila Chairman: Muhammad Tafsir Uddin Khan
  - MP (Netrokona-2): Ashraf Ali Khan Khasru

Area
  - Total: 340.35 km^{2} (131.41 sq mi)

Population (2022)
  - Total: 421,964
  - Density: 1,239.8/km^{2} (3,211.1/sq mi)
- Time zone: UTC+6 (BST)
- Postal code: 2400
- Area code: 0951
- Website: netrokonasadar.netrokona.gov.bd

Netrokona Sadar Upazila mauza geocode map

Netrokona Sadar (Bengali: নেত্রকোণা সদর) is an upazila (sub-district) of Netrokona District, Mymensingh Division, Bangladesh.

== Geography ==
Netrakona Sadar is located at 24.8750°N 90.7333°E. It has 87,575 households and a total area of 340.35 km^{2}. The upazila is bounded by Durgapur and Kalmakanda upazilas on the north, Kendua and Gauripur upazilas on the south, Barhatta and Atpara upazilas on the east, Purbadhala upazila on the west.

== History ==
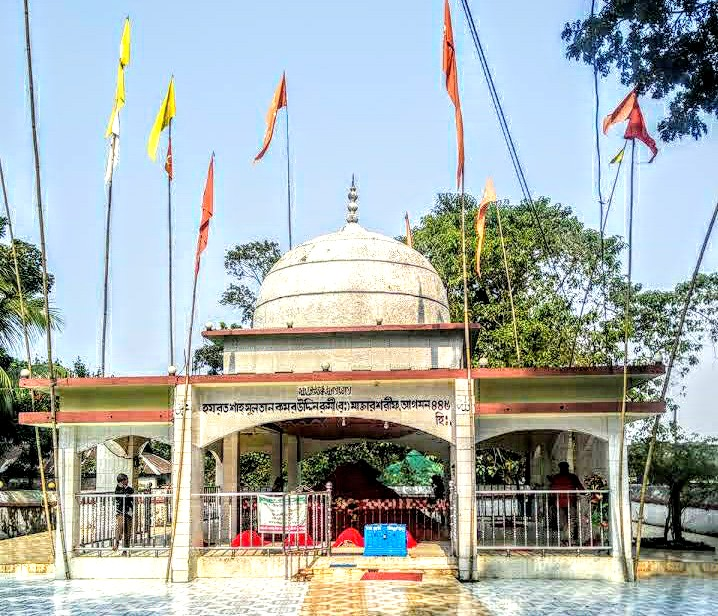
The mazar (mausoleum) of Shah Sultan Rumi.

Present-day Netrokona Sadar was ruled by a Koch king named Ganesh. The area was introduced to Islam by an 11th-century preacher by the name of Shah Sultan Rumi who arrived in 1053 CE. After gaining the king's respect, Rumi was given a few villages, in particular Madanpur, as a rent-free area. Rumi was buried in Madanpur in 1075.

In opposition to Company rule in India, a group of rebels known as the Pagal Panthis emerged in Greater Mymensingh in 1764 lasting up until 1852. Natorkona was one of the main locations effected by the Pagal Panthis. In response, a police outpost (thana) was set up by the British officers at Natorkona to assist their allied zamindars in suppressing the Pagal Panthi revolt. It is said that when the Pagal Panthis looted the outpost, the officers relocated to Kaliganj Bazar in Satpai mouza which is the site of the present Netrokona Sadar police station. However, the name of the thana remained as Natorkona, later being corrupted to Netrokona.

In 1829, the British East India Company tried to take over the estate of Shah Sultan Rumi. This was contested by the guardians of the shrine who provided an old Persian document dating from 1082 CE. In response, the government abandoned the plan and granted the estate to the document holder; Syed Jalaluddin. Netrokona was made a thana in 1938 and made the capital of Netrokona Mahakuma in 1882.

Amidst the Indian independence movement, influential nationalist Subhas Chandra Bose gave a speech at the Methar Patti grounds on 15 March 1939. The All India Peasant Conference was held from 8 to 10 April 1945 at the Parar grounds. During the Bangladesh War of Independence, the Pakistan Army captured 4 people and shot them dead at the Trimohani Bridge on 29 April 1971. A battle took place on 9 December leading to the death of three pro-independence fighters. The Pakistan army was finally defeated in Netrokona Sadar in a last encounter at the Agricultural Farm where two fighters were also killed. In 1983, the Netrokona thana was upgraded to an upazila and it was made the capital of the Netrokona District in 1984 under the decentralization programme of CMLA Hussain Muhammad Ershad.

== Demographics ==
Historical population
Year	Pop.	±%
1981	203,540	—
1991	265,643	+30.5%
2001	329,732	+24.1%
2011	372,785	+13.1%
2022	421,933	+13.2%
Source: Bangladesh Bureau of Statistics

Religions in Netrokona Sadar Upazila (2022)
Religion	Percent
Islam	90.35%
Hinduism	9.62%
Other or not stated	0.03%

According to the 2022 Bangladeshi census, Netrokona Sadar Upazila had 99,008 households and a population of 421,964. 9.92% of the population were under 5 years of age. Netrokona Sadar had a literacy rate (age 7 and over) of 70.96%: 72.81% for males and 69.17% for females, and a sex ratio of 97.82 males for 100 females. 135,298 (32.07%) lived in urban areas.

== Administration ==
Netrokona Thana was formed in 1874 and it was turned into an upazila in 1983.

Netrakona Sadar Upazila is divided into Netrakona Municipality and 12 union parishads: Amtala, Challisha, Dakshin Bishiura, Kailati, Kaliara Gabragati, Lokkhiganj, Madanpur, Medni, Maugati, Rauha, Singhar Bangla, and Thakurakona. The union parishads are subdivided into 255 mauzas and 332 villages.

Netrakona Municipality is subdivided into 9 wards and 51 mahallas.

== Notable people ==
- Abu Abbas (d. 2009), politician
- Mujibur Rahman Khan (1910–1984), journalist and litterateur
- Rashid Uddin (1889–1964), Baul mystic
- Shah Sultan Rumi (d. 1075), Muslim missionary

== See also ==
- Upazilas of Bangladesh
- Districts of Bangladesh
- Divisions of Bangladesh
- Administrative geography of Bangladesh
