= Chandradinga =

Hill in Mymensingh, Bangladesh

Map showing the location of Chandradinga Hill in the Garo Hills, Netrokona

Chandradinga (Bengali: চন্দ্রডিঙ্গা) is a hill located in the Kalmakanda Upazila of Netrakona District, in the Mymensingh Division of Bangladesh. It forms a part of the Garo Hills, which extend into Bangladesh from the Indian state of Meghalaya. The hill is renowned for its natural beauty and the local folklore associated with it, particularly the legend of Chand Sadagar, a prominent figure in Bengali mythology.

== Etymology and Folklore ==
The name Chandradinga is derived from two words: "Chandra", referring to Chand Sadagar, and "Dinga", meaning boat in Bengali. According to local folklore and interpretations of Bengali epic literature, the name commemorates the drowning of Chand Sadagar’s fleet of seven boats — known as Saptadinga — in a mythical sea called Kalidaha Sagar. This legend is prominently featured in the Manasamangal Kāvya, a key work of medieval Bengali literature.

According to the tale, the Hindu serpent goddess Manasa demanded worship from Chand Sadagar. Upon his refusal, she caused a storm that sank his seven boats. It is believed that the remnants of those boats are represented by seven rock formations in the Chandradinga area, contributing to the hill's mythical significance.

== Geography and Features ==
Chandradinga Hill is notable for its distinct shape, which resembles an overturned boat. The hill is surrounded by a scenic natural environment and offers panoramic views from the top. Several rock formations at the site are said to resemble boats, reinforcing the connection to the legend of the Saptadinga.
