= Khadija Amin =

Bangladeshi politician

- খাদিজা আমিন

Member of Parliament for Netrokona-3
- In office 1st
- In office August 2003 – 2006
- Preceded by: Nurul Amin Talukdar
- Succeeded by: Monjur Kader Kuraishi

Personal details
- Political party: Bangladesh Nationalist Party
- Spouse: Nurul Amin Talukdar

Khadija Amin is a Bangladesh Nationalist Party politician and former member of parliament for Netrokona-3.

== Biography ==
Khadija Amin was married to Nurul Amin Talukdar, the member of parliament from Netrokona-3 constituency of the Bangladesh Nationalist Party led Four Party Alliance. She was his second wife. Her father was an industrialist. She and Nurul Amin Talukdar had three children. She was a stay at home mother. Her husband died in May 2003, leaving the Netrokona Parliament seat vacant. By elections were called for the seat and she announced her candidacy. She was nominated by Bangladesh Nationalist Party. Her opponent was Advocate Jubed Ali, a former member of parliament from the constituency and candidate of the Bangladesh Awami League. She was elected to parliament from Netrokona-3 in Netrokona District in August 2003.

The Netrokona-3 constituency is one of ninety constituencies in Dhaka Division. The Bangladesh Nationalist Party became divided before the next election into two factions. The two factions were led by Khadija Amin and Rafiqul Islam Hilali, a leader of Jubo Dal. Local activist of Bangladesh Nationalist Party in Kendua Upazila and Atpara Upazila protest the party council formed by her in 2006 for having former members of Jatiya Party.
