= Mausoleum of seven martyrs =

Mausoleum in Kalmakanda, Netrakona, Bangladesh

Coordinates: 25.1853°N 90.7806°E

The Mausoleum of Seven Martyrs (Bengali: সাত শহীদের মাজার, romanized: Shaat Shohīder Mazar) or Saptashikha (Bengali: সপ্তশিখা, romanized: Shoptoshikha, lit. 'Seven flames') is located at Phulbari in Lengura Union at the foot of a hill in Kalmakanda Upazila bordering Netrakona district.

== History ==
On 26 July 1971, during the Bangladesh Liberation War, seven fighters were killed in a gun battle with the Pakistan army at the junction of three roads adjacent to the Nazirpur Union Land Office in Kalmakanda Upazila. Their bodies were later buried at Phulbari in Lengura Union, known as the Mausoleum of Seven Martyrs.

== Name of the martyrs ==
- Dr. Abdul Aziz
- Md. Fazlul Haque
- Md. Yar Mahmud
- Bhabatosh Chandra Das
- Md. Nuruzzaman
- Dwijendra Chandra Biswas
- Md. Jamal Uddin
