= Nazirpur Battle Day =

Annual observance in Bangladesh

Nazirpur Battle Day (Bengali: নাজিরপুর যুদ্ধ দিবস) or Nazirpur Day is observed annually on July 26 in Kalmakanda Upazila, Netrakona District, Bangladesh. The day commemorates the supreme sacrifice of seven valiant freedom fighters who embraced martyrdom in a "front battle" with Pakistani soldiers during the Liberation War in 1971.

== Background ==
On July 26, 1971, a face-to-face confrontation erupted between the Pakistani occupation forces and the freedom fighters in the Nazirpur area. The Pakistani forces were defeated, and seven freedom fighters laid down their lives fighting to free the Nazirpur area from army occupation. In the battle, several dozen Pakistani soldiers were killed, and many others, along with several Razakars, were captured.
