= Monjur Kader Kuraishi =

Bangladeshi politician (born 1953)

- মনজুর কাদের কোরাইশী

Member of Bangladesh Parliament
- In office 1st
- In office 2008–2014
- Preceded by: Khadija Amin
- Succeeded by: Iftiquar Uddin Talukder Pintu

Personal details
- Born: 30 Jun 1953; Netrokona
- Political party: Bangladesh Awami League

Monjur Kader Kuraishi (Bengali: মনজুর কাদের কোরাইশী; b. 30 June 1953) is a Bangladesh Awami League politician and a former member of parliament for Netrokona-3.

== Early life ==
Monjur Kader Kuraishi was born on 30 June 1953 to a Bengali Muslim family in Netrokona, Bengal Presidency (now Bangladesh).

== Career ==
Kuraishi was elected to parliament from Netrokona-3 as a Bangladesh Awami League candidate in 2008.
