= Rafiqul Islam Hilali =

Bangladeshi politician

- রফিকুল ইসলাম হিলালী

Member of Parliament
- Incumbent
- Assumed office 17 February 2026
- Preceded by: Iftiquar Uddin Talukder Pintu
- Constituency: Netrokona-3

Personal details
- Born: 1 May 1969 (age 57) Kendua Upazila, Netrokona District
- Party: Bangladesh Nationalist Party

Rafiqul Islam Hilali is a Bangladeshi politician of the Bangladesh Nationalist Party. He is currently serving as a member of parliament from Netrokona-3 .

== Early life ==
Hilali was born on 1 May 1969 at Kendua Upazila under Netrokona District.
