= Jalal Uddin Talukder =

Bangladeshi politician

- জালাল উদ্দিন তালুকদার

Member of Parliament
- In office 14 July 1996 – 13 July 2001
- Preceded by: Abdul Karim Abbasi
- Succeeded by: Abdul Karim Abbasi
- Constituency: Netrokona-1
- In office 10 July 1986 – 6 December 1987
- Preceded by: Constituency created
- Succeeded by: Golam Rabbani
- Constituency: Netrokona-2
- In office 2 April 1979 – 24 March 1982
- Constituency: Mymensingh-12

Personal details
- Died: 25 September 2012 (aged 65) Durgapur Upazila, Netrokona, Bangladesh
- Party: Bangladesh Awami League

Jalal Uddin Talukder (died 25 September 2012) was a Bangladesh Awami League politician and a Jatiya Sangsad member representing the Mymensingh-12, Netrokona-2 and Netrokona-1 constituencies.

== Career ==
Talukder was elected to parliament from Mymensingh-12 as a Bangladesh Awami League candidate in 1979. He was elected to parliament from Netrokona-2 as a Bangladesh Awami League candidate in 1986. He was elected to parliament from Netrokona-1 as a Bangladesh Awami League candidate on 12 June 1996.

== Death ==
Talukder was shot dead in his home in Netrokona on 26 September 2012.

== Personal life ==
Talukdar was married to Ayesha Khanam. He had a son, Kutubuddin Talukder Royel.
