= Arif Khan Joy =

Bangladeshi footballer and politician

- আরিফ খান জয়
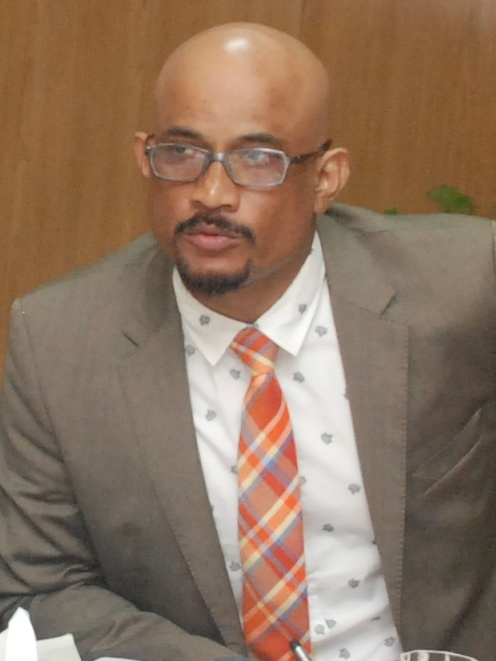
- Khan in 2016

Deputy Minister of Youth and Sports
- In office 14 January 2014 – 7 January 2019
- Preceded by: Position created
- Succeeded by: Vacant

Member of Parliament for Netrokona-2
- In office 29 January 2014 – 29 October 2018
- Preceded by: Ashraf Ali Khan Khasru
- Succeeded by: Ashraf Ali Khan Khasru

Personal details
- Born: 20 November 1971 (age 54) Netrokona, Bangladesh
- Party: Independent
- Other political affiliations: Awami League(2014-2019)
- Height: 1.78 m (5 ft 10 in)
Association football career
- Position: Defensive midfielder
Senior career*
Years	Team	Apps	(Gls)
1993–1994	PWD SC		
1995	Dhaka Abahani		
1996	Brothers Union		
1997–1998	Mohammedan SC		
1999–2001	Muktijoddha Sangsad		
2001–2003	Mohammedan SC		
2003–2010	Dhaka Abahani		
International career
1996	Bangladesh U19	6	(0)
2003–2008	Bangladesh	21	(1)
- * Club domestic league appearances and goals

Arif Khan Joy (born 20 November 1971) is a Bangladeshi politician and a retired professional footballer who captained the Bangladesh national team.

== Football ==
Joy played for the Bangladesh national football team from 2003 until 2008 and was a member of the 2003 SAFF Championship winning squad. He captained the national team during 2005–06.

== Honours ==
Abahani Limited Dhaka

- Bangladesh Premier League: 2007, 2008–09, 2009–10
- Dhaka Premier Division League: 1995
- Independence Day Tournament (Rajshahi): 2005
- Victory Day Club Cup: 2008

Mohammedan SC

- Dhaka Premier Division League: 2002
- National League: 2001–02

Muktijoddha Sangsad KC

- Dhaka Premier Division League: 2000
- National League: 2000

Bangladesh

- SAFF Championship: 2003

== Politics ==
Joy was elected as a Member of Parliament for the Netrokona-2 constituency in 2014. He was a member of the Bangladesh Awami League party. A former professional footballer and vice president of the Bangladesh Football Federation, Joy has been appointed as Deputy Minister in the Ministry of Youth and Sports, the first former professional athlete to hold a position in this ministry.

== Controversy ==
Joy allegedly vandalized the office of a joint-secretary in the sports ministry in 2015. He was also alleged to assault an on-duty police officer, who subsequently filed a case against him in 2016, In August 2024 with the fall of Prime Minister Sheikh Hasina, Joy was arrested in connection with a murder case involving the death of a grocery store owner in Mohammadpur, Dhaka. He was apprehended by the Detective Branch in Dhanmondi and subsequently placed on a five-day remand by a Dhaka court. Following this, he faced additional remand periods totaling 14 days as investigations continued.
