= Apu Ukil =

Bangladeshi politician

- অপু উকিল
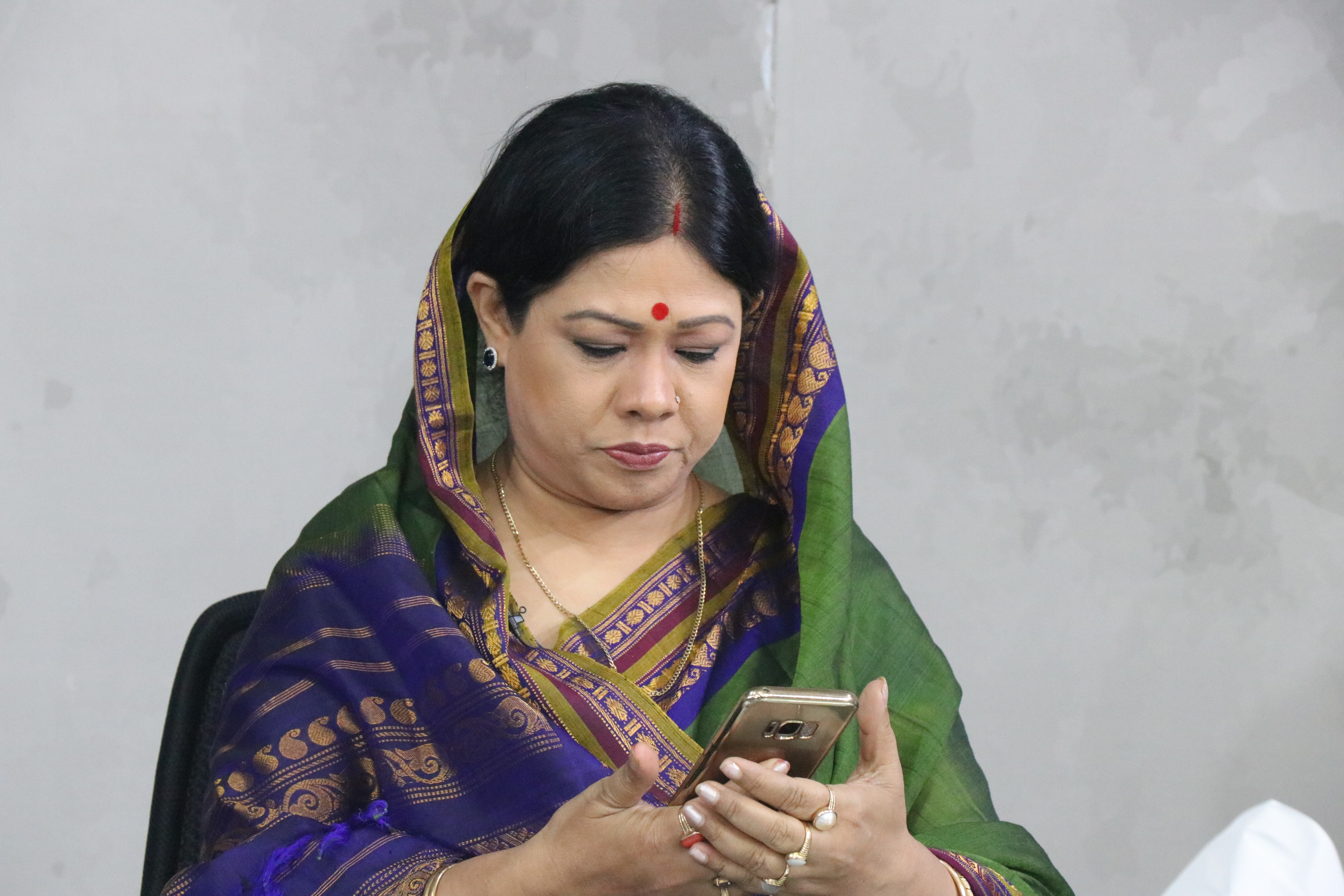
- Apu Ukil in 2018

Member of Bangladesh Parliament
- In office 10 April 2014 – 30 December 2018

Personal details
- Born: 1 September 1972; Netrakona
- Political party: Bangladesh Awami League

Apu Ukil (Bengali: অপু উকিল) is a Bangladesh Awami League politician and a former member of parliament from a reserved seat.

== Career ==
Apu Ukil was elected to parliament from reserved seat as a Bangladesh Awami League candidate in 2014. She is the founding general secretary of the Jubo Mohila Awami League who served from March 2004 to December 2022. Her husband, Ashim Kumar Ukil, is also a Bangladesh Awami League politician.
