= Ashim Kumar Ukil =

Bangladeshi politician

- অসীম কুমার উকিল

Member of Parliament
- In office 29 January 2019 – 29 January 2024
- Preceded by: Iftiquar Uddin Talukder Pintu
- Succeeded by: Iftiquar Uddin Talukder Pintu
- Constituency: Netrokona-3

Personal details
- Born: 1 March 1957 (age 68); Netrokona, Bangladesh
- Political party: Bangladesh Awami League
- Spouse: Apu Ukil
- Profession: Politician

Ashim Kumar Ukil (Bengali: অসীম কুমার উকিল) is a Bangladesh Awami League politician and a former member of parliament of Netrokona-3.

== Career ==
Ashim Kumar Ukil was elected to parliament from Netrokona-3 as a Bangladesh Awami League candidate on 30 December 2018. He is the cultural secretary of Bangladesh Awami League.

He contested the national election on 7 January 2024 as an Awami League candidate. He received 74,550 votes but lost to Iftiquar Uddin Talukder Pintu who received 76,803 votes.
