= Abdul Karim Abbasi =

Bangladeshi politician and lawyer

Abdul Karim Abbasi (Sarfaraz Hussain)

Member of the Bangladesh Parliament for Netrokona-1
- In office 28 October 2001 – 27 October 2006
- Preceded by: Jalal Uddin Talukder
- Succeeded by: Mustaque Ahmed Ruhi
- In office 5 March 1991 – 30 March 1996
- Preceded by: Sirajul Islam

Personal details
- Born: 15 December 1938 (age 87) Netrokona, Bengal Province, British India
- Party: Liberal Democratic Party
- Spouse: Hamida Bagom
- Children: 5
- Parents: Md Abbas Ali (father); Robzan (mother)
- Education: University of Dhaka
- Occupation: Teacher

Abdul Karim Abbasi (born Sarfaraz Hussain) (born 15 December 1938) is a senior lawyer, semi-professional teacher and Bangladeshi politician. Former whip and member of parliament for Netrokona-1.

== Career ==
Abbasi was elected to parliament from Netrokona-1 as a candidate of the Bangladesh Nationalist Party in 1991, 1996 and 2001. In 2006, he joined the Liberal Democratic Party and became senior vice-president of the party.
