= Netrokona-3 =

Constituency of Bangladesh's Jatiya Sangsad

Coordinates: 24.66°N 90.84°E

- Constituency for the Jatiya Sangsad
- District: Netrokona District
- Division: Mymensingh Division
- Electorate: 420,686 (2026)

Current constituency
- Created: 1984
- Party: Bangladesh Nationalist Party
- Member: Rafiqul Islam Hilali
- ← 158 Netrokona-2 160 Netrokona-4 →

Netrokona-3 is a constituency represented in the Jatiya Sangsad (National Parliament) of Bangladesh since 2026 by Rafiqul Islam Hilali of the Bangladesh Nationalist Party.

== Boundaries ==
The constituency encompasses Atpara and Kendua upazilas.

== History ==
The constituency was created in 1984 from a Mymensingh constituency when the former Mymensingh District was split into four districts: Mymensingh, Sherpur, Netrokona, and Kishoreganj.

== Members of Parliament ==
Election	Member	Party
1986	Fazlur Rahman Khan	Awami League
1988	Ashraf Uddin Khan	Jatiya Party
1991	Zubed Ali	Awami League
1996	Nurul Amin Talukdar	Bangladesh Nationalist Party
2003 by-election	Khadija Amin	Bangladesh Nationalist Party
2008	Monjur Kader Kuraishi	Awami League
2014	Iftiquar Uddin Talukder Pintu	Awami League
2018	Ashim Kumar Ukil	Awami League
2024	Iftiquar Uddin Talukder Pintu	Awami League
2026	Rafiqul Islam Hilali	Bangladesh Nationalist Party

== Elections ==
=== Elections in the 2020s ===
General election 2026: Netrokona-3
Party	Candidate	Votes	%	±%
BNP	Rafiqul Islam Hilali	118,469		
Independent	Md. Delwar Hossain Bhuiyan	68,961		
Majority				
Turnout		234,942		
Registered electors		420,686		
BNP gain from AL				

=== Elections in the 2010s ===
General Election 2014: Netrokona-3
Party	Candidate	Votes	%	±%
AL	Iftiquar Uddin Talukder Pintu	164,980	93.5	+33.6
JP(E)	Jasim Uddin Bhuiyan	11,453	6.5	N/A
Majority		153,527	87.0	+66.4
Turnout		176,433	60.4	−25.5
AL hold				

=== Elections in the 2000s ===
General Election 2008: Netrokona-3
Party	Candidate	Votes	%	±%
AL	Monjur Kader Kuraishi	132,557	59.9	+18.9
BNP	Rafiqul Islam Hilale	86,948	39.3	−16.5
IOJ	Md. Ahtesham Sarwar	1,388	0.6	N/A
KSJL	Rigen Ahmed	382	0.2	−1.8
Majority		45,609	20.6	+5.8
Turnout		221,275	85.9	+23.5
AL gain from BNP				

Nurul Amin Talukdar died in June 2003. Khadija Amin, his widow, was elected in an August 2003 by-election.

Netrokona-3 by-election, August 2003
Party	Candidate	Votes	%	±%
BNP	Khadija Amin	95,251	55.8	+4.9
AL	Jubed Ali	69,966	41.0	−5.4
KSJL	Syed Abu Zafar Sabat	3,424	2.0	+1.8
Independent	Abdul Wahab	890	0.5	N/A
JP(E)	Ali Osman Khan	869	0.5	N/A
KSMA	Mohammad Sadek	201	0.1	N/A
Jatiya Party (M)	Abdul Ali	104	0.1	−0.2
Majority		25,285	14.8	+10.3
Turnout		170,705	62.4	−12.7
BNP hold				

General Election 2001: Netrokona-3
Party	Candidate	Votes	%	±%
BNP	Nurul Amin Talukdar	103,123	50.9	+5.1
AL	Jubed Ali	93,966	46.4	+5.8
IJOF	Md. Rukun Uddin	4,290	2.1	N/A
Jatiya Party (M)	Abdul Ali	630	0.3	N/A
KSJL	Syed Abu Zafar Sabat	460	0.2	N/A
Majority		9,157	4.5	−0.8
Turnout		202,469	75.1	+1.1
BNP hold				

=== Elections in the 1990s ===
General Election June 1996: Netrokona-3
Party	Candidate	Votes	%	±%
BNP	Nurul Amin Talukdar	70,943	45.8	+7.3
AL	Jubed Ali	62,810	40.6	+1.3
JP(E)	A. Mannan Bhuiyan	15,652	10.1	+7.8
Jamaat	A. Aziz Bhuyan	3,748	2.4	−9.2
Samridhya Bangladesh Andolan	Ali Osman Khan	741	0.5	N/A
Zaker Party	Obaidul Haque Dhali	653	0.4	−1.2
Gano Forum	Zahir Uddin Ahmed	286	0.2	N/A
Majority		8,133	5.3	+4.6
Turnout		154,833	74.0	+24.6
BNP gain from AL				

General Election 1991: Netrokona-3
Party	Candidate	Votes	%	±%
AL	Jubed Ali	45,882	39.3	
BNP	Md. Lutfe Ahmed Khan	44,977	38.5	
Jamaat	A. Aziz Bhuyan	13,511	11.6	
BAKSAL	Abdul Kuddus	4,577	3.9	
JP(E)	A. Ali	2,702	2.3	
Independent	Atiqur Rahman	2,141	1.8	
Zaker Party	Md. Safir Uddin	1,893	1.6	
NDP	Sirajul Islam Khan Pathan	1,094	0.9	
Majority		905	0.8	
Turnout		116,777	49.4	
AL gain from				
