= Kailati Union =

Kailati Union কৈলাটি ইউনিয়ন
- Location in Bangladesh
- Coordinates: 25.037149°N 90.917760°E
- Country: Bangladesh
- Division: Mymensingh Division
- District: Netrokona District
- Upazila: Kalmakanda Upazila

Population (2022)
  - Total: 42,422
- Time zone: UTC+6 (BST)

Kailati Union (Bengali: কৈলাটি ইউনিয়ন) is a union parishad under Kalmakanda Upazila of Netrokona District in northern Bangladesh

== Area Overview ==
Kalmakanda Thana (police station) was established in 1941 and it became an upazila in 1983. Bulk of the people in the upazila depend on agriculture for a living. The upazila has one health complex, two satellite clinics, eight family planning centres and a TB and leprosy control centre.

== Geography ==
Kailati Union has an area of 13,199 acres (5,341 ha).

== Demographics ==
According to the 2022 Bangladeshi census, Kailati Union had 9,676 households with a total population of 42,422 of which 20,875 were males and 21,545 females. Muslims numbered 40,420, Hindus 1,999.

Kailati Union had a literacy rate of 34.2 %.
