= Golam Rabbani (Netrokona politician) =

Bangladeshi politician

Member of Bangladesh Parliament
- In office 1988–1990
- Preceded by: Jalal Uddin Talukder
- Succeeded by: Abu Abbas

Golam Rabbani (Bengali: গোলাম রাব্বানী) is a politician and a former member of parliament for Netrokona-2.

== Career ==
Rabbani was elected to parliament from Netrokona-2 as a Combined opposition candidate in 1988.
