= Iftiquar Uddin Talukder Pintu =

Bangladeshi politician (1964–2025)

- ইফতিকার উদ্দিন তালুকদার পিন্টু

Member of the Bangladesh Parliament for Netrokona-3
- In office 30 January 2024 – 6 August 2024
- Preceded by: Ashim Kumar Ukil
- Succeeded by: Rafiqul Islam Hilali
- In office 29 January 2014 – 29 January 2019
- Preceded by: Monjur Kader Kuraishi
- Succeeded by: Ashim Kumar Ukil

Personal details
- Born: 10 November 1964 Netrokona, East Pakistan, Pakistan
- Died: 28 July 2025 (aged 60) Dhaka, Bangladesh
- Party: Bangladesh Awami League

Iftiquar Uddin Talukder Pintu (10 November 1964 – 28 July 2025) was a Bangladesh Awami League politician and a Jatiya Sangsad member representing the Netrokona-3 constituency.

== Background ==
Pintu was born on 10 November 1964. He died at a private hospital in Dhaka, on 28 July 2025, at the age of 60. He had been suffering from various medical problems for some time.

== Career ==
Pintu was elected to Parliament from Netrokona-3 on 5 January 2014 as a Bangladesh Awami League candidate.

Pintu was elected to parliament from Netrokona-3 as an independent candidate on 7 January 2024. One of his supporters was killed by the supporters of the previous member of parliament, Ashim Kumar Ukil, after they attacked Pintu's supporters.
