= Barakharpan Union =

Barakharpan Union বরখাপন ইউনিয়ন
- Location in Bangladesh
- Coordinates: 25.037149°N 90.917760°E
- Country: Bangladesh
- Division: Mymensingh Division
- District: Netrokona District
- Upazila: Kalmakanda Upazila

Population (2022)
  - Total: 17,502
- Time zone: UTC+6 (BST)

Barakharpan Union (Bengali: বরখাপন ইউনিয়ন) is a union parishad under Kalmakanda Upazila of Netrokona District in northern Bangladesh

== Area Overview ==
Kalmakanda Thana (police station) was established in 1941 and it became an upazila in 1983. Bulk of the people in the upazila depend on agriculture for a living. The upazila has one health complex, two satellite clinics, eight family planning centres and a TB and leprosy control centre.

== Geography ==
Barakharpan Union has an area of 9,131 acres (3,695 ha).

== Demographics ==
According to the 2022 Bangladeshi census, Barakharpan Union had 4,167 households with a total population of 17,502, of which 8,457 were males and 9,044 females. Muslims numbered11,292, Hindus 6,207.

Barakharpan Union had a literacy rate of 35.1 %.
