= Kumudini Hajong =

Hajong revolutionary (1929/1930 – 2024)

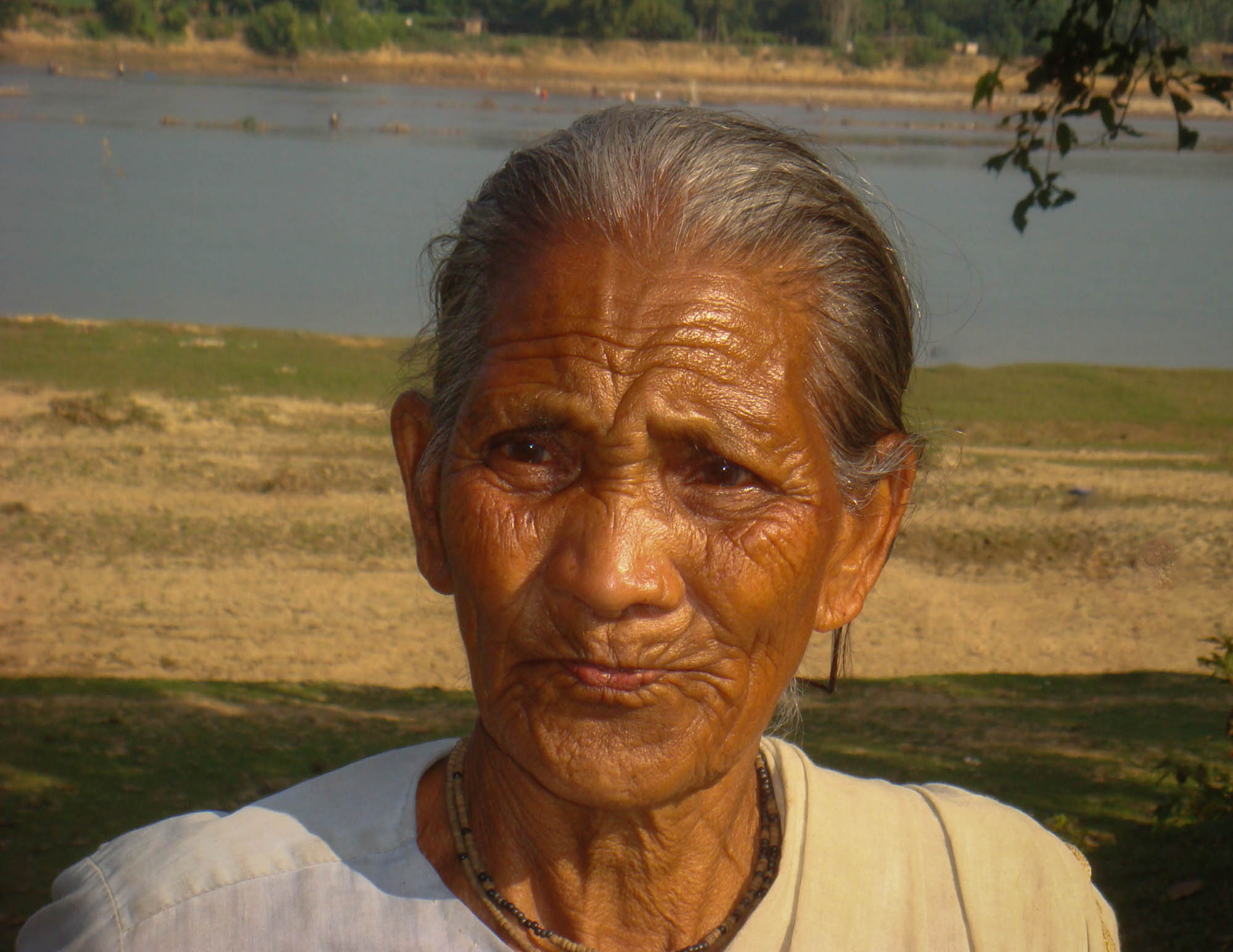
- Born: 1929/1930; Mymensingh District, British Bengal
- Died: 23 March 2024 (aged 93–94); Baheratoli, Durgapur Upazila, Netrokona District, Bangladesh
- Known for: Tanka movement
- Awards: Bangla Academy Fellowship (2019)

Kumudini Hajong (Bengali: কুমুদিনী হাজং; 1929/1930 – 23 March 2024) was a Bangladeshi Hajong revolutionary, indigenous and secular rights activist known for her role in the Tanka movement during the British Raj. She received a Bangla Academy Fellowship in 2019 for her contribution to social welfare.

Hajong was born in c. 1930 at Baheratoli village in Mymensingh (present-day Durgapur Upazila, Netrokona) in the former Bengal Presidency of British India to Authit Chandra Roy Hajong and Jonomoni Hajong.

Hajong was married to Lonkshwer Hajong. He died in 2000. The couple had three sons and two daughters. She died at her home on 23 March 2024.

== Awards ==
- Bangla Academy Fellowship (2019)
- Anannya Top Ten Awards (2003)

== Notes ==
1. The Daily Star reported that at the time of her death she was 94.
