= Tanka movement =

Peasant movement in Mymensingh region of British India

- Part of Peasant Revolution against British
Location	Mymensingh District, British Bengal (later East Bengal, Pakistan)

Belligerents
British Raj (1937–1947) Dominion of Pakistan (1947–1950)	All India Kisan Sabha: Local peasantry

Commanders and leaders
(Bengal Presidency) Bengal (1937–1947) (Pakistan) East Bengal (1947–1950)	Moni Singh; Rashmoni Hajong; Kumudini Hajong

Units involved
Police Service	Bengal group

Casualties and losses
unknown	60 killed

The Tanka movement (Bengali: টঙ্ক আন্দোলন) also known as the Tonko Rebellion was a militant agrarian struggle on behalf of the Hajong tribal people in Mymensingh District, British Bengal (later East Bengal, Pakistan) 1937–1950. The movement was parallel, but distinct from, the Tebhaga movement in other parts of Bengal. The Hajong movement was inspired by the struggles of Moni Singh.

Bengali communist cadres had arrived in the Hajong areas in the 1930s, and helped to organise the Hajong peasants. During the period of 1942 and 1945, Hajong sharecroppers organized in the Kisan Sabha struggled against feudal domination of Bengali Hindu landlords. There was a severe crackdown against the movement in 1946. The Hajong then turned to guerrilla struggles. By the time of independence of Pakistan, the Hajong guerrillas operating along the Indo-Pakistani border were well organised.

Hajong armed communist rebels captured control over a number of villages and set up their own administration there. The Hajong rebels were led by Lulit Surkuhr Hajong and Podmolohchon Surkuhr Hajong. After being confronted by the Pakistani Army, the rebels built up a base in Baghmara, Garo Hills on the Indian side of the border. For some time they conducted frequent cross-border raids against Pakistani police parties. Additional Pakistani police forces were sent to the area, patrolling the entire border area of the Mymensingh District.

The Pakistani state forces conducted a violent campaign of repression against the Hajong people, and most Hajongs left Pakistan for India. Pakistani authorities claimed that "almost all" of the Hajong refugees were communist sympathizers, a claim that was used to motivate the expropriation of their households and lands. These lands were sold to Bengali Muslim refugees from India at low rates.

The rebels eventually settled down permanently in India. Lulit Surkuhr Hajong founded a branch of the Communist Party of India in the Garo Hills, whilst Podmolohchon Surkuhr Hajong founded a branch of the same party in the Khasi Hills along with Ruh'imohon Hajong and Chondromohan Hajong.

== Background ==
Both the meaning and origin of the word "Tanka" are unknown. The system of assured payment of agricultural land rent through paddy was called Tanka in Mymensingh region. In other parts of Bengal this method of payment of rent was known by different names. The poor landless farmers of Mymensingh region chose this method of payment of rent as it was more profitable to pay paddy as rent than the money that had to be paid under the conventional system of payment of rent. According to the Tanka rule, the zamindars auctioned the land every year and the farmer who auctioned the most paddy was given that land. The minimum rate of Tanka at auctions tends to increase over time. At one point this rate increased so much that in 1937 the minimum rate of Tanka at auction was approximately 555 kg for 3/4 of an acre.

After the Chittagong armoury raid incident, the British Raj started arresting politicians arbitrarily. Five years after the arrest of Communist Party of India member Moni Singh in 1930, he was placed on parole at his home in Mymensingh District. At that time the local farmers complained to him about the Tanka. He was then arrested again and released in 1937. After returning home to his village, the local farmers pressed him to launch a movement for the abolition of the Tanka system. In November 1937, he started the Tanka movement by bringing together the farmers. As part of the movement, farmers refused to pay paddy as rent and demanded the traditional method of payment of rent.
