= Manu Majumdar =

Bangladeshi politician (1959–2024)

Manu Majumder
- মানু মজুমদার

Member of the Bangladesh Parliament for Netrokona-1
- In office 30 January 2019 – 7 January 2024
- Preceded by: Chhabi Biswas
- Succeeded by: Mustaque Ahmed Ruhi

Personal details
- Born: 14 August 1959 Kishoreganj, East Pakistan, Pakistan
- Died: 22 May 2024 (aged 64) Bengaluru, Karnataka, India
- Party: Awami League

Manu Majumdar (14 August 1959 – 21 May 2024) was a Bangladeshi Awami League politician and a Jatiya Sangsad member representing the Netrokona-1 constituency from 2019 to 2024.

== Background ==
Majumdar was born on 14 August 1959. He was the brother-in-law of the previous member of parliament, Chhabi Bishwas, from Netrokona-1. Majumdar died in Narayana Institute of Cardiac Sciences in Bengaluru, India on 21 May 2024, at the age of 64.

== Career ==
Majumdar hailing from Kishoreganj, Dhaka was elected to parliament from Netrokona-1 as an Awami League candidate 30 December 2018 and later became a voter of Netrokona afterward. He received 249,738 votes while his nearest rival, Kaiser Kamal of Bangladesh Nationalist Party, received 16,332 votes. His nomination was protested by Awami League supporters who described him as an "outsider".
