= Chhabi Biswas (politician) =

Bangladeshi politician

- ছবি বিশ্বাস

Member of Parliament
- In office 2014–2018
- Preceded by: Mustaque Ahmed Ruhi
- Succeeded by: Manu Majumdar
- Constituency: Netrokona-1

Personal details
- Born: 26 May 1951 (age 74) East Pakistan
- Party: Bangladesh Awami League
- Other political affiliations: Communist Party of Bangladesh

Chhabi Biswas (b. 26 May 1951) is a Bangladesh Awami League politician and a former member of parliament from Netrokona-1.

== Career ==
Biswas's political career started as a member of Communist Party of Bangladesh. He participated in the general election of 1991 in Netrokona-1 constituency from Communist Party of Bangladesh and received 3,918 votes, which is 3.8% of total votes cast at that time. Later on he joined the Bangladesh Awami League. Biswas was elected to parliament on 5 January 2014 from Netrokona-1 as a Bangladesh Awami League candidate and served till 30 December 2018. In December 2014, he was assaulted in Dhaka Medical College and Hospital by Bangladesh Nationalist Party activists and his car was burned down.
