= Sirajul Islam (principal) =

Bangladeshi politician

Member of Bangladesh Parliament
- In office 1986–1988
- In office 1988–1990

Personal details
- Party: Jatiya Party (Ershad)

Sirajul Islam (Bengali: সিরাজুল ইসলাম) is a Jatiya Party (Ershad) politician and a former member of parliament for Netrokona-1.

== Career ==
Islam was elected to parliament from Netrokona-1 as an Awami League and Jatiya Party candidate in 1986 and 1988 respectively.
