= Kalmakanda Upazila =

Kalmakanda কলমাকান্দা
- Upazila
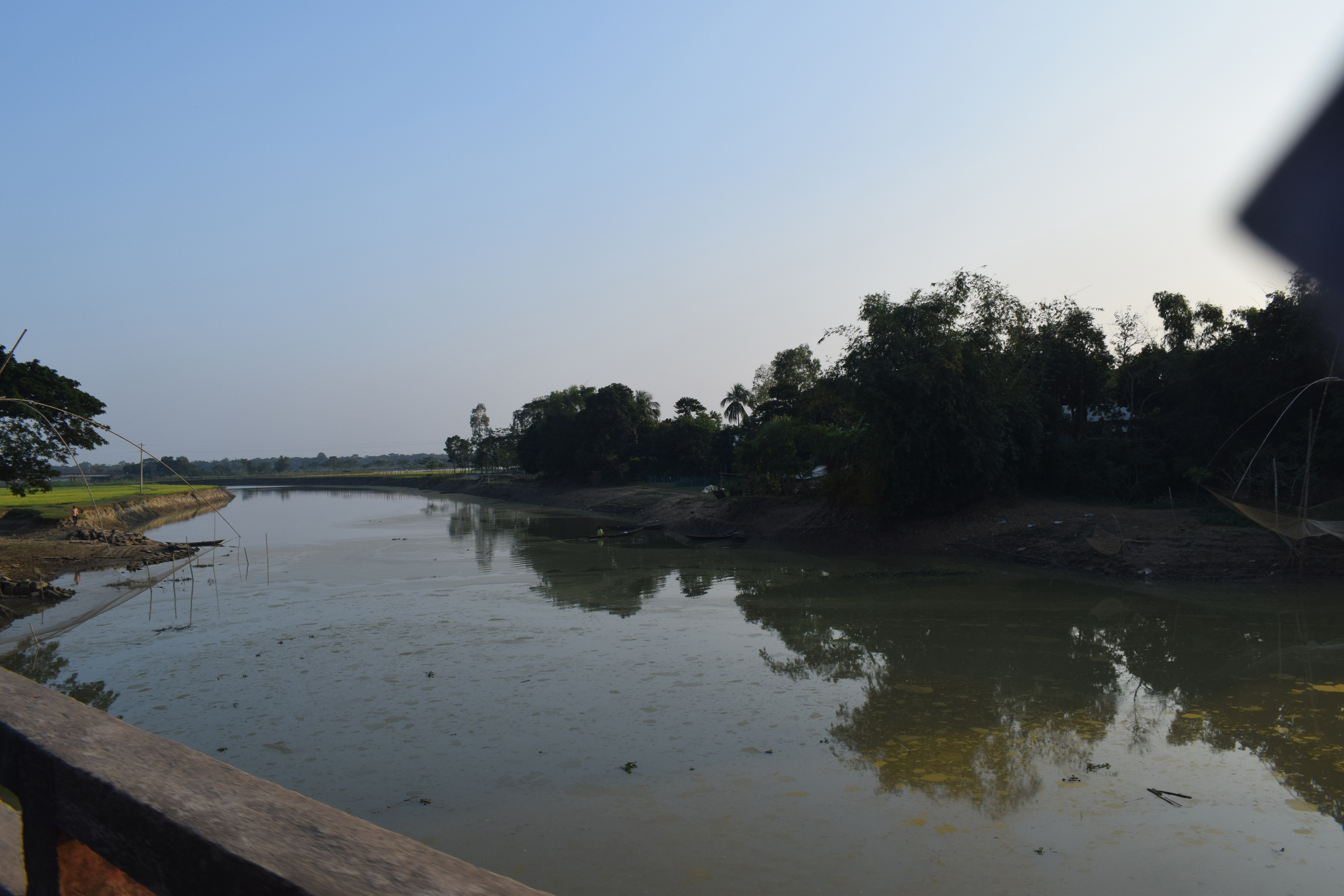
- Goneshwari River at Kalmakanda Upazila

- Coordinates: 25°5′N 90°53.5′E
- Country: Bangladesh
- Division: Mymensingh
- District: Netrokona

Area
  - Total: 377.41 km^{2} (145.72 sq mi)

Population (2022)
  - Total: 271,348
  - Density: 718.97/km^{2} (1,862.1/sq mi)
- Time zone: UTC+6 (BST)
- Postal code: 2430
- Website: kalmakanda.netrokona.gov.bd Official Map of Kalmakanda

Kalmakanda Upazila mauza geocode map

Kalmakanda (Bengali: কলমাকান্দা), originally Karamakhanda, is an upazila of Netrokona District in the Division of Mymensingh, Bangladesh.

== Geography ==
Kalmakanda is located at 25.0833°N 90.8917°E. It has 39275 households in total area 377.41 km^{2}. The upazila is bounded by Meghalaya state of India on the north, Barhatta and Netrokona sadar upazilas on the south, Dharmapasha upazila on the east, Durgapur upazila on the west.

== Demographics ==
Historical population
Year	Pop.	±%
1981	171,077	—
1991	209,360	+22.4%
2001	234,398	+12.0%
2011	271,912	+16.0%
2022	271,328	−0.2%
Source: Bangladesh Bureau of Statistics

Religions in Kalmakanda Upazila (2022)
Religion	Percent
Islam	87.07%
Hinduism	9.82%
Christianity	2.87%
Other or not stated	0.24%

According to the 2022 Bangladeshi census, Kalmakanda Upazila had 63,322 households and a population of 271,348. 11.61% of the population were under 5 years of age. Kalmakanda had a literacy rate (age 7 and over) of 63.80%: 64.69% for males and 62.94% for females, and a sex ratio of 97.31 males for 100 females. 11,213 (4.13%) lived in urban areas. The ethnic population was 9,374 (3.45%), of which 6800 were Garo and 2500 Hajong.

Population of Kalmakanda upazila by ethnicity (2022)
1. Bengali (96.5%)
2. Garo (2.51%)
3. Hajong (0.92%)
4. Others (0.02%)

== Administration ==
Kalmakanda Thana was formed in 1941 and it was turned into an upazila in 1983.

Kalmakanda Upazila is divided into eight union parishads: Barakharpan, Kailati, Kalmakanda, Kharnai, Langura, Nazirpur, Pogla, and Rangchhati. The union parishads are subdivided into 177 mauzas and 347 villages.

== Notable residents ==
- Abdul Karim Abbasi was the Member of Parliament for constituency Netrokona-1 from 1991 to 1995 and 2001 until 2006.
- Chhabi Biswas has been the Member of Parliament for constituency Netrokona-1 since 2014.
- Mustaque Ahmed Ruhi was the Member of Parliament for constituency Netrokona-1 from 2009 until 2014.
- Jalal Uddin Talukder was the Member of Parliament for constituency Netrokona-1 from 1996 until 2001.

== See also ==
- Upazilas of Bangladesh
- Districts of Bangladesh
- Divisions of Bangladesh
