= Nurul Amin Talukdar =

Bangladeshi politician (1946–2003)

Nurul Amin Talukder
- নুরুল আমিন তালুকদার

Member of Parliament for Netrokona-3
- In office 3rd
- In office February 1996 – 4 June 2003
- Preceded by: Jubed Ali
- Succeeded by: Khadija Amin

Personal details
- Born: February 1946; Netrokona
- Died: 4 June 2003 (aged 57); New Delhi, India
- Political party: Bangladesh Nationalist Party
- Spouse: Khadija Amin

Nurul Amin Talukdar (February 1946 – 4 June 2003) was a Bangladesh Nationalist Party politician who served as a member of Jatiya Sangsad in the 6th, 7th and 8th parliament representing the Netrokona-3 constituency.

== Career ==
Talukdar was the company commander at Sector No. 11 during the 1971 Liberation War. He joined the BNP on 19 June 1995 and was the member of BNP's National Executive Committee.

Talukdar served as the chairman of Rainbow Group.
