= Ashraf Ali Khan Khasru =

Bangladeshi politician

- আশরাফ আলী খান খসরু
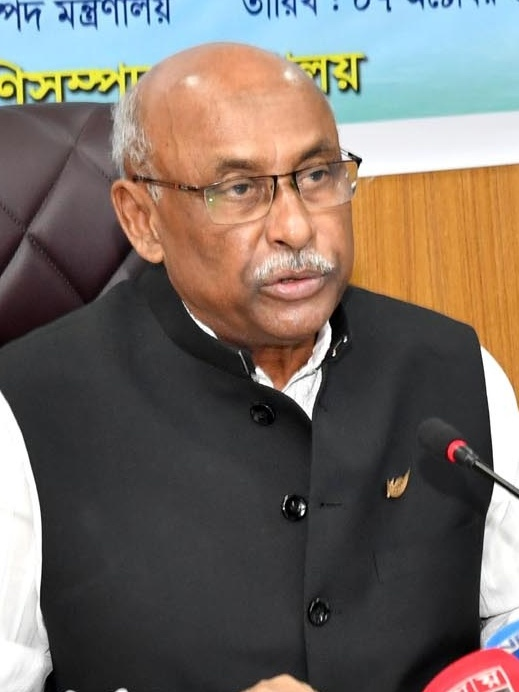
- Khasru in Dhaka (2019)

Minister of State for Social Welfare
- In office 13 January 2020 – 10 January 2024
- Preceded by: Sharif Ahmed
- Succeeded by: Farzana Sharmin

Minister of State for Fisheries and Livestock
- In office 7 January 2019 – 13 January 2020
- Succeeded by: Sharif Ahmed

Member of Parliament for Netrokona-2
- In office 7 January 2019 – 6 August 2024
- Preceded by: Arif Khan Joy
- In office 25 January 2009 – 24 January 2014
- Preceded by: Abu Abbas

Personal details
- Born: 22 March 1949 (age 77)
- Party: Bangladesh Awami League
- Spouse: Kamrunnesa Ashraf Dina

Ashraf Ali Khan Khasru (born 22 March 1949) is a Bangladesh Awami League politician. He is a former State Minister of Social Welfare and State Minister of Fisheries and Livestock. He is also a former Jatiya Sangsad member representing the Netrokona-2 constituency.

== Personal life ==
Khasru was married to Kamrunnesa Ashraf Dina (d. 2023). She was a social worker, scholar and Netrokona Mahila Awami League President. She was awarded Begum Rokeya Padak posthumously in 2023 for her contributions to the socio-economic development of women.
