= Mustaque Ahmed Ruhi =

Bangladeshi politician and a former member of parliament

- মোশতাক আহমেদ রুহী

Member of the Bangladesh Parliament for Netrokona-1
- In office 30 January 2024 – 6 August 2024
- Preceded by: Manu Majumdar
- Succeeded by: Kayser Kamal
- In office 29 December 2008 – 5 January 2014
- Preceded by: Abdul Karim Abbasi
- Succeeded by: Chhabi Biswas

Personal details
- Born: 19 June 1974 (age 52)
- Party: Bangladesh Awami League
- Education: Ananda Mohan College

Mustaque Ahmed Ruhi (born 19 June 1974) is a Bangladeshi politician and a former Jatiya Sangsad member representing the Netrokona-1 (Durgapur-Kalmakanda) constituency. In 2008, he was elected as a member of the Bangladesh Awami League nominee in the general election. He is a former AGS and VP consecutively of Ananda Mohan College Central Students Union (AMUCSU).

== Early life ==
Mustaque Ahmed Ruhi was born on 19 June 1974.

Ruhi got a scholarship with Talentpool from Netrakona Government Primary School. Then he was admitted to the Government Anjuman School. In 1989, he got 'Star Marks' and passed the secondary examination from Mymensingh Zilla School. Ruhi completed Higher Secondary, Honors and MMS in Ananda Mohan University College respectively in 1991, 1994 and 1996.

== Career ==
Ruhi was elected to parliament on 29 December 2008 as a candidate of Awami League from Netrokona-1 defeating Kayser Kamal of Bangladesh Nationalist Party.

Ruhi raised the question of the disappearance of four individuals in his constituency in February 2011 and asked Minister of Home Affairs what steps could be taken.

Ruhi was re-elected to the parliament from the same constituency on 7 January 2024 as a candidate of the Awami League defeating Jhuma Talukder, an independent candidate.

On 23 September 2026, Ruhi was arrested by Mohammadpur Police from a residence on Iqbal Road in Mohammadpur, Dhaka.

== Published books ==
- Rajniti Ha Ya Ba Ra La
- Janata Jibonmrita
- Pakritik gas-er sondhane
