= Abu Abbas (politician) =

Bangladeshi politician (died 2009)

- আবু আব্বাছ

Member of Parliament for Netrokona-2
- In office 10 October 2004 – 27 October 2006
- Preceded by: Abdul Momin
- Succeeded by: Ashraf Ali Khan Khasru
- In office 5 March 1991 – 24 November 1995
- Preceded by: Golam Rabbani
- Succeeded by: Fazlur Rahman Khan

Personal details
- Died: 31 August 2009 (aged 75) Dhaka, Bangladesh
- Party: Bangladesh Nationalist Party

Abu Abbas (died 31 August 2009) was a politician of the Bangladesh Nationalist Party and a Jatiya Sangsad member representing the Netrokona-2 constituency for two terms, from 1991 to 1995 and from 2004 to 2006.

In November 2008, the Anti-Corruption Commission filed a case against Abbas accusing him of concealing information regarding his wealth.
