= Ashraf Uddin Khan =

Bangladeshi politician

Member of Bangladesh Parliament
- In office 18 February 1979 – 12 February 1982

Personal details
- Party: Bangladesh Nationalist Party

Ashraf Uddin Khan (Bengali: আশরাফ উদ্দিন খান), is a Bangladesh Nationalist Party politician. He is a former member of parliament for Mymensingh-15.

== Career ==
Khan was elected to parliament from Mymensingh-15 as a Bangladesh Nationalist Party candidate in 1979.
