= Durgapur Upazila, Netrokona =

Upazila in Mymensingh division, Bangladesh

Durgapur দূর্গাপুর
- Upazila
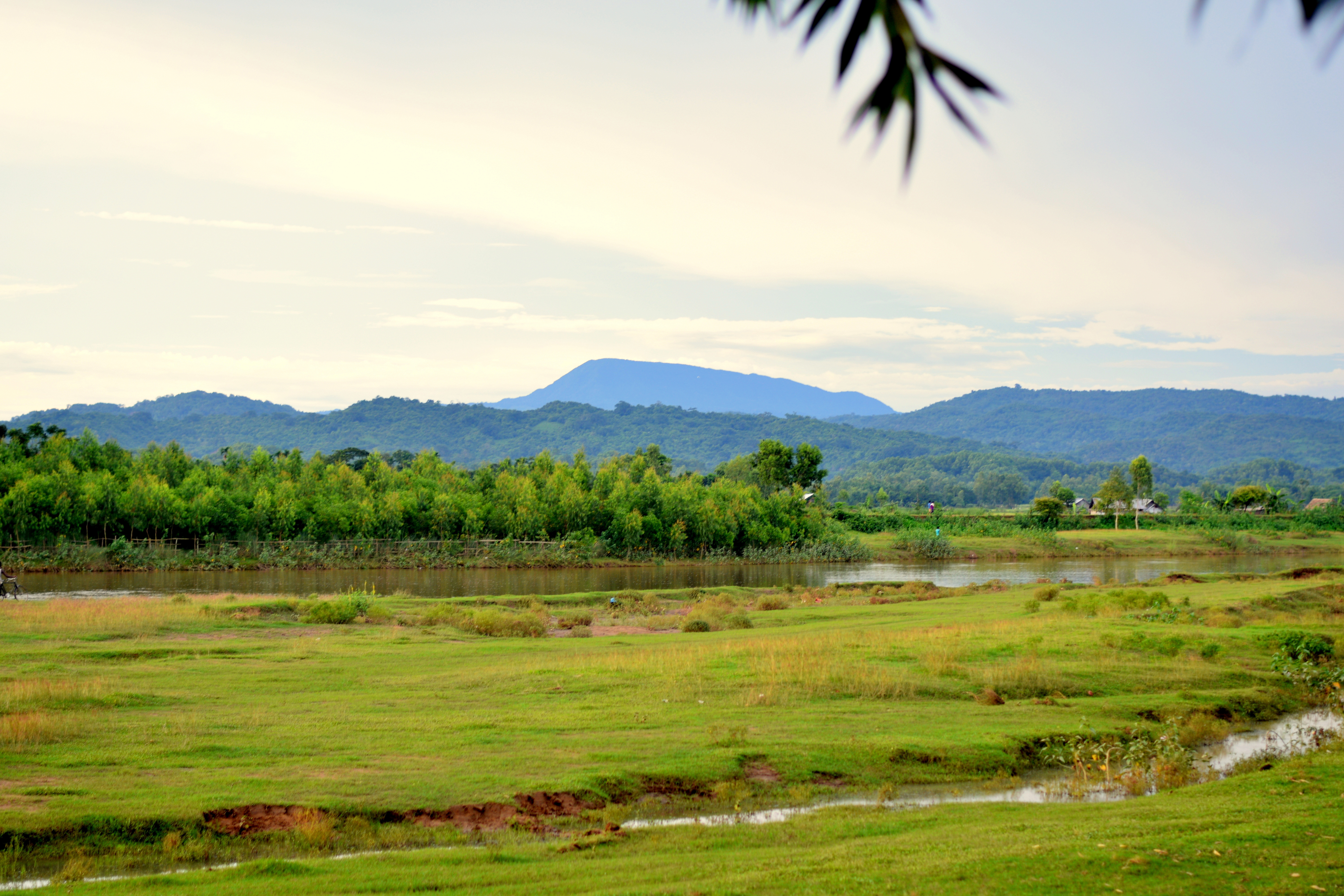
- Crop fields with the Garo Hills in the distance at Durgapur Upazila

- Coordinates: 25°7.5′N 90°41.3′E
- Country: Bangladesh
- Division: Mymensingh
- District: Netrokona

Area
  - Total: 293.42 km^{2} (113.29 sq mi)

Population (2022)
  - Total: 242,457
  - Density: 826.31/km^{2} (2,140.1/sq mi)
- Time zone: UTC+6 (BST)
- Postal code: 2420
- Area code: 09525
- Website: durgapur.netrokona.gov.bd Official Map of Durgapur

Durgapur Upazila mauza geocode map

Durgapur (Bengali: দূর্গাপুর) (also referred to as Susang Durgapur) is an upazila of the Netrokona District in the Mymensingh Division of Bangladesh.

== Geography ==
Durgapur is located at 25.1250°N 90.6875°E. It has 32,245 households and a total land area of 293.42 km^{2}. It is bounded by Meghalaya state of India on the north, Netrokona Sadar and Purbadhala upazilas on the south, Kalmakanda upazila on the east, Dhobaura upazila of Mymensingh district on the west. The Garo hills and valleys are on the northern part of the upazila.

== Demographics ==
Historical population
Year	Pop.	±%
1981	135,274	—
1991	169,135	+25.0%
2001	198,326	+17.3%
2011	224,873	+13.4%
2022	242,445	+7.8%
Source: Bangladesh Bureau of Statistics

Religions in Durgapur Upazila (2022)
Religion	Percent
Islam	90.78%
Hinduism	5.30%
Christianity	3.68%
Other or not stated	0.24%

According to the 2022 Bangladeshi census, Durgapur Upazila had 58,507 households and a population of 242,457. 11.56% of the population were under 5 years of age. Durgapur had a literacy rate (age 7 and over) of 66.76%: 67.73% for males and 65.84% for females, and a sex ratio of 96.99 males for 100 females. 39,721 (16.39%) lived in urban areas. The ethnic population was 10,598 (4.37%), of which 8500 were Garo and 1800 Hajong.

Population of Durgapur upazila by ethnicity (2022)
1. Bengali (95.6%)
2. Garo (3.52%)
3. Others (0.85%)

=== Composition of Durgapur Thana ===
Total Households: 8,250

1. Bangali; Total Village: 48; Total Household: 4,778; Language Practiced: Bengali; Religion Practiced: Islam, Hinduism (minority);

2. Banai; Total Village: 1; Total Household: 6; Language Practiced: Banai; Religion Practiced: Hinduism;

3. Buna / Buno; Total Village: 3; Total Household: 37; Language Practiced: Bengali; Religion Practiced: Hinduism; Buna / Buno in Other Districts: Dhaka, Gazipur, Mymensingh, Rajbari, Sherpur, Tangail, Bagerhat, Jessore, Jhenaidah, Khulna, Kushtia, Magura, Satkhira, Bogra, Dinajpur, Joypurhat, Naogaon, Natore, Nilphamari, Pabna, Rajshahi, Sirajganj, Maulvibazar;

4. Garo; Number of Villages they lived with bangali: 10; Total Household: 924; Language Practiced: Achik / Garo (98.08%), Deal (1.92%); Religion Practiced: Christianity (99.96%), Shangsharik (0.04%); Garo lived in Other Districts: Sherpur, Mymensingh, Banderban, Chittagong,

5. Hajong; Number of Villages they lived with bangali: 08; Total Household: 505; Language Practiced: Hajong; Religion Practiced: Hinduism; Hajong in Other Districts: Mymensingh, Sherpur, Sunamganj;

The city's area is 293.42 km^{2} It is an ancient town situated on the banks of the river Somessori. This habitation known as a tourist area. There are civil and criminal courts here from British rule regime.

population Density 710 (per km^{2}) literacy in rate in village 31.0% and in town 52.3% Population of the town 22661 and village 175665

== Administration ==
Durgapur Thana was formed in 1874 and converted into upazila in 1982.

Durgapur Upazila is divided into Durgapur Municipality and seven union parishads: Bakaljora, Birisiri, Chandigarh, Durgapur, Gaokandia, Kakairgara, and Kullagora. The union parishads are subdivided into 129 mauzas and 210 villages.

Durgapur Municipality is subdivided into 9 wards and 30 mahallas.

== Newspapers ==
Susang Barta is a Bengali-language online news portal and weekly newspaper published from Durgapur Upazila in Netrokona District, Bangladesh. The publication covers local, national, and international news, as well as topics related to politics, economy, education, culture, health, technology, agriculture, sports, and entertainment. In addition to its weekly print edition, Susang Barta regularly publishes news and feature reports through its online platform. The editor and publisher of the newspaper is Md. Jamal Talukder."Susang Barta". Susang Barta.

== Notable residents ==
- Mustaque Ahmed Ruhi - Former Member of 9th National Parliament of 157th constituency which included this area.
- Kumudini Hajong - Activist of Tanka movement

== Points of interest ==
- BGB Camp
- Bijoypur
- Birishiri Trival cultural Academy
- Blue Water Lake
- Monosapara Adventist School & Seminary
- Ranikong Mission School
- Rashimoni Statue
- Sagor Dighi
- Someshwari River
- Susang (sculpture)
- TEBHAHA Movement
- Tonk Movement Statue 1942-43

== Transport ==
Over last 10 years, Durgapur has become a famous tourist spot. The most common transport used to visit Durgapur is bus or train. Every night at 11.50 PM, a train named Haor Express leaves Dhaka for Netrokona.

Direct bus from Dhaka to Durgapur is available from Dhaka Mohakhali Inter City Bus Terminal, it usually takes 5 hours to reach Durgapur by bus. The roads of Durgapur are highly damaged as innumerable trucks filled with wet sand from the Someshwari river travel them without following proper protocol.

== Gallery ==
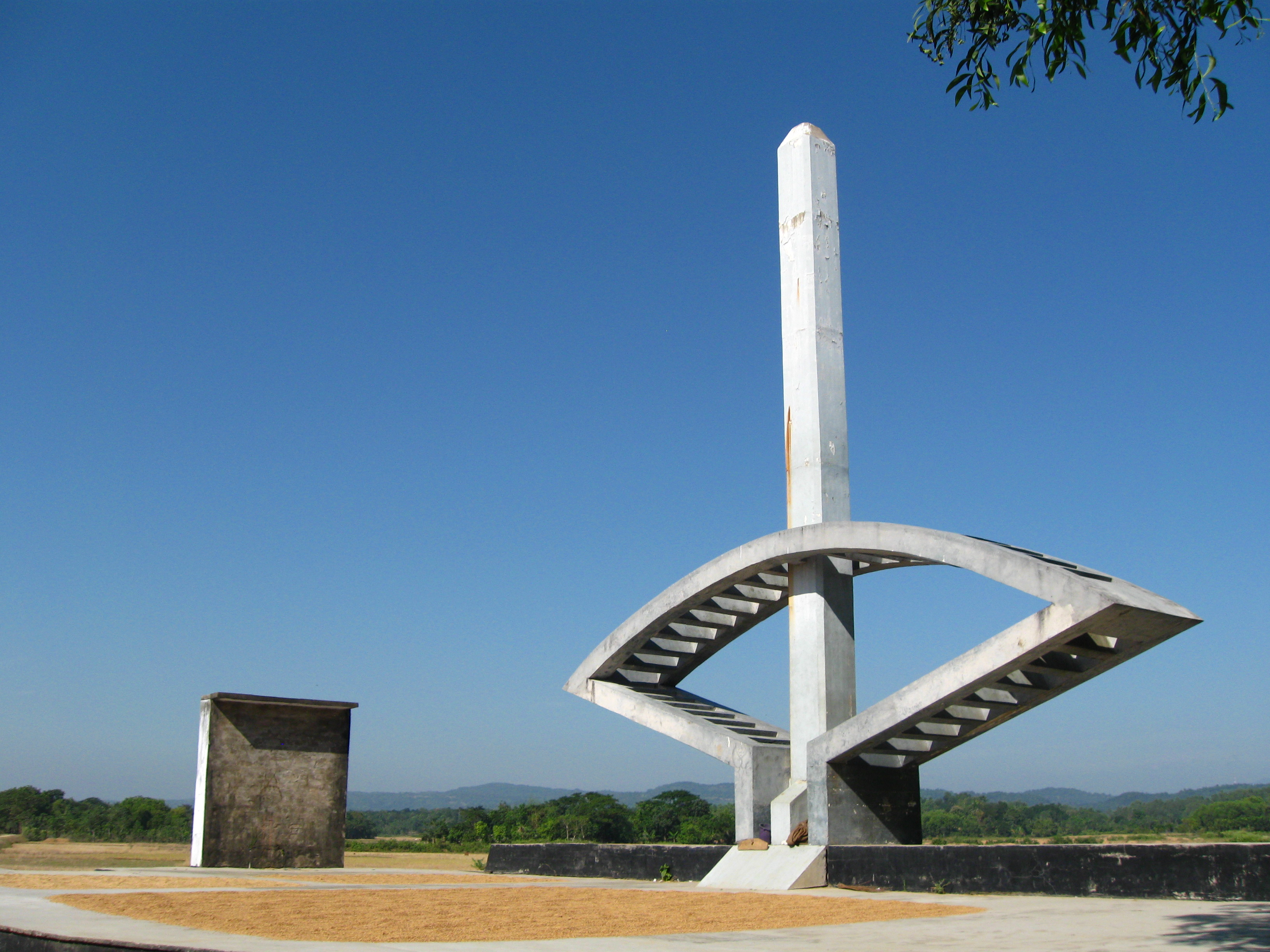
Hajong Mata Roshimoni monument

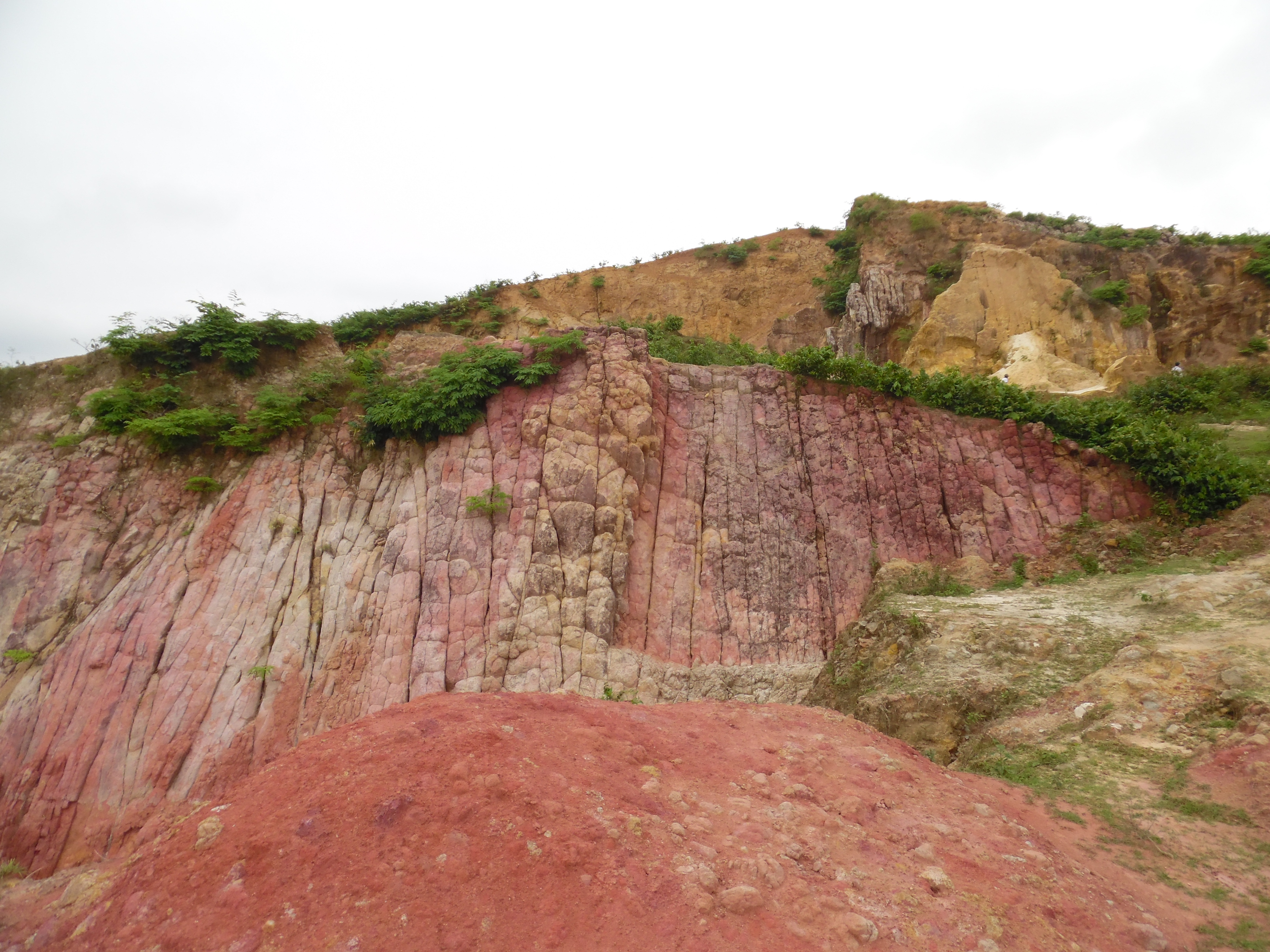
China Clay Mine in Bijoypur, Durgapur

== See also ==
- Upazilas of Bangladesh
- Districts of Bangladesh
- Divisions of Bangladesh
