= Khalekdad Chowdhury =

Bangladeshi writer, playwright and novelist

- খালেকদাদ চৌধুরী
- Born: 2 February 1907; Changaon, Netrokona, Bengal Presidency
- Died: 16 October 1985 (aged 78)
- Education: Lord Ripon College; Islamia College
- Awards: Ekushey Padak (2018)

Khalekdad Chowdhury (Bengali: খালেকদাদ চৌধুরী; 2 February 1907 – 16 October 1985), also known by pen names Shahadat Chowdhury and Atashbaz, is a reputed Bangladeshi writer, playwright and novelist. In recognition of his contribution to Bengali language and literature, the government of Bangladesh posthumously awarded him the country's second highest civilian award Ekushey Padak in 2018.

== Early life and family ==
Chowdhury was born on 2 February 1907 in his maternal home at the village of Changaon in Madan, Netrokona of the erstwhile Bengal Presidency's Mymensingh district. He belonged to a Bengali Muslims family and was the eldest of Nawab Ali Chowdhury and Najmunnessa Chowdhury's eight sons and two daughters. Chowdhury's paternal home was in the village of Sonajor in Atpara, and they were descendants of one of the 16th-century Baro-Bhuiyan families. Following the Battle of Plassey in 1757, his ancestors had found refuge in the Gazipur. Later, two brothers named Ghazi Lashkar and Ghazi Askar from this family settled in the Pargana of Alapsingh in present-day Mymensingh Division. The younger brother, Ghazi Askar, permanently settled in Sonajor, where his descendants live and were granted the title of Chowdhury. Khalekdad Chowdhury is the fifth generational descendant of Ghazi Askar.

== Education ==
Chowdhury's education began at the Nazirganj Primary School in 1911, and then at the Jahangirpur School in Madan in 1916. The following year, Chowdhury enrolled at the Datta High School from where he passed his first-class matriculation in 1924. He proceeded to study at the Lord Ripon College in Kolkata, and later at the Islamia College of Calcutta where he received his Bachelor of Arts in English.

== Career ==
His father, Nawab Ali Chowdhury, died in February 1928, which meant that the family responsibilities were passed down to him. Chowdhury was thus unable to complete his education and so returned to Netrokona. His career began in 1929 as the supervisor of Calcutta Midland Bank's Netrokona branch. The following year, he served as an assistant teacher at a school in Calcutta. From 1944 to 1961, he worked for the government as a public relations officer in Netrokona, Sunamganj and Sylhet. For a long time, he was the director of Netrokona children's organisation Modhumachi Koci-kacar Mela and the elected general secretary of Red Crescent Society. He established a general library in Netrokona and was involved in the Bangladesh Liberation War of 1971.

=== Literary career ===
Chowdhury's writings emerged around the same time he was working as a bank supervisor. He preferred writing over his main career. His first poem was published in a magazine named Bikash from Calcutta that was edited by Bande Ali Mia. His writings were inspired by the works of poets Abdul Quadir and Abul Kalam Shamsuddin. To earn a side-income during his time as a teacher, Chowdhury joined Abul Mansur Ahmad's Daily Krishak newspaper as the writer for its children's section Chandher Hat under the pen name of "Shahadat Chowdhury". At that time, people used to call him Mama (uncle). After meeting Qazi Nazrul Islam in 1941, he became actively involved in Nazrul's literary addas. He became a literary editor of Nazrul's Daily Nabajug and simultaneously directed the Aguner Phulki children's paper under the pen name of "Atashbaz". Chowdhury was also a regular writer for the Monthly Saogat, Monthly Mohammadi, Mahe Nao, Dilruba Jugbani, Sachitra Sandhani, Pakistan Khabar, Pratidhwani and other magazines and papers. From Netrokona, he used to edit and publish the fortnightly Uttar Akash and literary periodical Srijani to motivate the young Bengali writers of the time. Notable writers that wrote for these two magazines were Rafiq Azad, Helal Hafiz, Jivana Chaudhury, Shantimaya Viswasa and Nirmalendu Goon.

In 1983, Chowdhury was awarded the Bangla Academy Literary Award.

== Personal life ==
Chowdhury married his cousin (paternal aunt's daughter) Hamida Chowdhury in October 1927.

== Death and legacy ==
Chowdhury died on 16 October 1985, with his last work being a short story titled Abarta. Following his death, essayist Abu Jafar Shamsuddin wrote an article in which he said:

... Kazi Nazrul Islam was the full moon in the young Muslim society of that time. Numerous stars were shining around him, radiating as much light as he could. Everyone is saying goodbye one by one. The last star fell as soon as Khalekdad Chowdhury passed away.

To notify Chowdhury's contributions to the new generation and to preserve his memory, the Netrokona Literature Society introduced the Khalekdad Chowdhury Literary Award in 1997. Every year on Pohela Falgun, a poet or literatteur is awarded this, and past winners include Rafiq Azad, Kabir Chowdhury, Rabeya Khatun, Bulbon Osman, Abu Hasan Shahriar, Anisul Hoque, Helal Hafiz, Selim Al Deen, Humayun Ahmed, Mahadev Saha, Nirmalendu Goon, Jatin Sarker and Muhammed Zafar Iqbal.

== Works ==
He has published 15 books including novels, short stories, essays, translations, plays etc:

- Ekti Atmar Apamrittu
- Raktakta Adhyay
- Chand Beger Garh
- Shap Marir Abhishap
- E Mati Rokte Ranga

His translation books are:

- Maru Sahara
- Baharistan-i-Ghaibi, four volumes, (Divya Prakash, Dhaka)
- Al Bakar Dwip
- Bishwa Sahitya Parichay
- Abhishapta Masnad (play)
- Shatabdir Dui Diganta (autobiographical work)
