= Sahata =

Small agricultural village in north-eastern Bangladesh

- Village and Union
- Location in Bangladesh
- Coordinates: 24.8717°N 90.9714°E
- Country: Bangladesh
- Division: Mymensingh
- District: Netrokona
- Upazila: Barhatta
- Time zone: UTC+6 (Bangladesh Time)
- Website: sahataup.netrokona.gov.bd

Sahata (সাহতা) is a village situated in Barhatta Upazila of Netrokona District, under Mymensingh Division in Bangladesh. The village also serves as the administrative center of 2 No. Sahata Union Parishad, a local governing body that looks after a few other villages, including Demura. Sahata is an agriculturally dependent area where paddy and vegetables are the main crops for cultivation. Most of the people here are engaged in agriculture for their livelihood.

This union has several government primary schools, madrasas and a Union Health and Family Welfare Center, which provides primary healthcare to the locals.

Various development activities have been undertaken by the government's 'Amar Gram, Amar Shahar' project. Notable among these is the installation of 190 twin pit latrines in Demura village, which has helped improve sanitation. The Union Parishad has its own website, where developments, notices and other information are published.
