= Raipur Union =

Raipur Union, Raypur Union or Roypur Union (transliterations of রায়পুর ইউনিয়ন) may refer to several places in Bangladesh:

- Raipur Union, Bagherpara, Jessore District
- Raypur Union, Gangni, Meherpur District
- Raypur Union, Jibannagar, Chuadanga District
- Raypur Union, Barhatta, Netrakona District
- Roypur Union, Chittagong District

== See also ==
- Raipur (disambiguation)
- Raypur (disambiguation)
