= Duoj Union =

Duoj Union দুওজ ইউনিয়ন
- Location in Bangladesh
- Coordinates: 24.773937°N 90.897327°E
- Country: Bangladesh
- Division: Mymensingh Division
- District: Netrokona District
- Upazila: Atpara Upazila

Population
  - Total: 16,787
- Time zone: UTC+6 (BST)

Duoj Union (also spelled Duaz) (Bengali: দুওজ ইউনিয়ন) is a union parishad under Atpara Upazila of Netrokona District in northern Bangladesh

== Geography ==
Union Parishads in Atpara Upazila
U:union parishads
Owing to space constraints in the small map, the actual locations in a larger map may vary slightly

Duoj Union has a total area of 6,286 acres (2,544 ha).

== Demographics ==
According to the 2022 Bangladeshi census, Duoj Union had 4,005 households and had a total population of 16,787 of which males numbered 8,190 and females numbered 8,595. Muslims numbered 15,067, Hindus 1,719 .

Duoj Union had a literacy rate of 38.8%.
