= Shormushia Union =

Shormushia Union স্বরমুশিয়া ইউনিয়ন
- Location in Bangladesh
- Coordinates: 24.812036°N 90.823051°E
- Country: Bangladesh
- Division: Mymensingh Division
- District: Netrokona District
- Upazila: Atpara Upazila

Population
  - Total: 25,222
- Time zone: UTC+6 (BST)

Shormushia Union (Bengali: স্বরমুশিয়া ইউনিয়ন) is a union parishad under Atpara Upazila of Netrokona District in northern Bangladesh

== Geography ==
Union Parishads in Atpara Upazila
U:union parishads
Owing to space constraints in the small map, the actual locations in a larger map may vary slightly

Shormushia Union has a total area of 7,094 acres (2,871 ha).

== Demographics ==
According to the 2022 Bangladeshi census, Shormushia Union had 5,751 households with a total population of 25,222 of which males numbered 12,390 and females numbered 12,831. Muslims numbered 24,147, Hindus 1069.

Shormushia Union had a literacy rate of 39.9%.
