= Baushi Union =

Baushi Union বাউসী ইউনিয়ন
- Location in Bangladesh
- Coordinates: 24.942985°N 90.832461°E
- Country: Bangladesh
- Division: Mymensingh Division
- District: Netrokona District
- Upazila: Barhatta Upazila

Population (2022)
  - Total: 25,264
- Time zone: UTC+6 (BST)
- Post code: 2052

Baushi Union (Bengali: বাউসী ইউনিয়ন) is a union parishad under Barhatta Upazila of Netrokona District in northern Bangladesh

== History ==
In the late 16th and early 17th centuries, Isa Khan led a confederation of twelve zamindar families in the Bhati region of eastern Bengal.

== Geography ==
Baushi Union has a total area of 7,111 acres (2,878 ha).

There is a hatbazaar (marketplace) at Baushi.

== Demographics ==
According to the 2022 Bangladeshi census, Baushi Union had 5,822 households and had a total population of 25,264 of which males numbered 12,453 and females numbered 12,807. Muslims numbered 23,361, Hindus 1900.

Baushi Union had a literacy rate of 37.5 %.

== Villages ==
A union council or a rural council, rural union, simply union, is the smallest rural administrative and local government unit in Bangladesh,

Mouzas (villages in aushi Union with a population exceeding 2,000 in 2022 Bangladesh census were (population in brackets): Dashdhar (6,367), Dashdhar (2,010) and Mouati (2,383}.

== Civic facilities ==
Bangladesh census 2022 provides information about various facilities availed by people. Here the information for the union is provided. The page number in brackets after the information is the page of the census report on which it is available.

In Baushi Union, 62.05% of the population above 15 years and above have a mobile phone for their use. 22.01% of the population above years are internet users. (page 662). 15.97% of the population are having account in financial institution, bank/ insurance/micro-credit/post office etc. 36.48% of the population are having mobile account. (page714}. In Baushi Union, 97.79% of the population are having their own dwelling unit - 90.97% have kancha structures, 0.90% have pucca structures and 0.55% live in jhupries. (page769). In Baushi Union, 99.38% have electricity coverage. 85.43 % use wood/chalk/ chopped wood as cooking fuel, 6.53% use wood-coal/ charcoal/ dried dung. (page 929)

== Education ==
Baushi Aurdhachandra High School was established in 1939.
