= Sahata Union =

Sahata Union সাহতা ইউনিয়ন
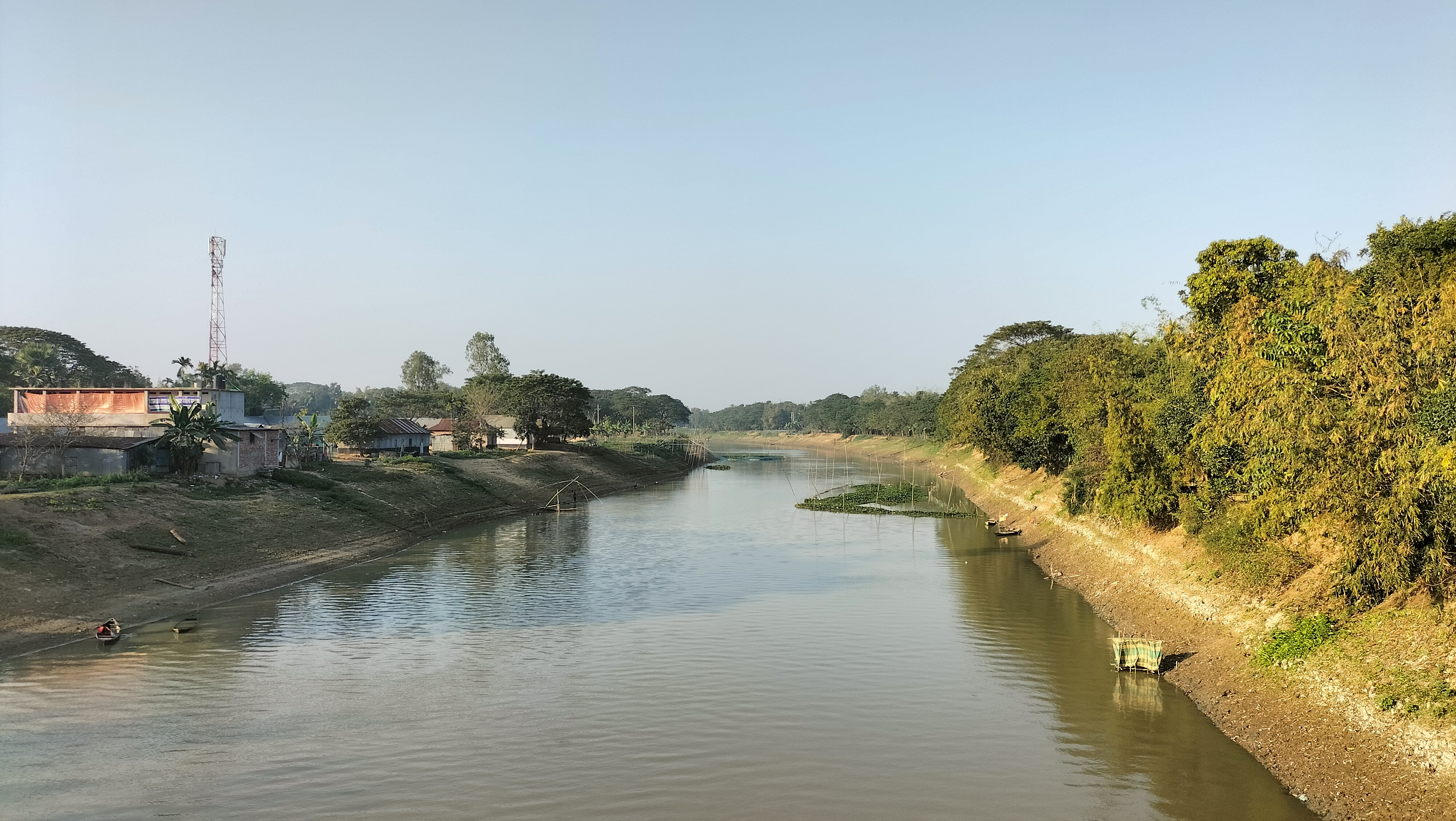
- Bishnai River at Sahata

- Location in Bangladesh
- Coordinates: 24.883383°N 90.840584°E
- Country: Bangladesh
- Division: Mymensingh Division
- District: Netrokona District
- Upazila: Barhatta Upazila

Population (2022)
  - Total: 29,892
- Time zone: UTC+6 (BST)

Sahata Union (Bengali: সাহতা ইউনিয়ন) is a union parishad under Barhatta Upazila of Netrokona District in northern Bangladesh

== Geography ==
Sahata Union has a total area of 8,835 acres (3,575 ha).

== Demographics ==
According to the 2022 Bangladeshi census, Sahata Union had 6,865 households and had a total population of 29,892 of which males numbered 14,580 and females numbered 15,301. Muslims numbered 26,946, Hindus 2,943 .

Sahata Union had a literacy rate of 34.5 %.

== Civic facilities ==
Bangladesh census 2022 provides information about various facilities availed by people. Here the information for the union is provided. The page number in brackets after the information is the page of the census report on which it is available.

In Sahata Union, 59.35% of the population above 15 years and above have a mobile phone for their use. 16.74% of the population above years are internet users. (page 664). 15.32% of the population are having account in financial institution, bank/ insurance/micro-credit/post office etc. 34.40 % of the population are having mobile account. (page716}. In Sahata Union, 98.27% of the population are having their own dwelling unit - 88.55% have kancha structures, 0.99% have pucca structures and 0.60% live in jhupries. (page771). In Sahata Union, 99.55% have electricity coverage. 75.13% use wood/chalk/ chopped wood as cooking fuel, 20.18 % use wood-coal/ charcoal/ dried dung. (page 931)
