= Lunesshor Union =

Lunesshor Union লুনেশ্বর ইউনিয়ন
- Location in Bangladesh
- Coordinates: 24.819073°N 90.898803°E
- Country: Bangladesh
- Division: Mymensingh Division
- District: Netrokona District
- Upazila: Atpara Upazila

Population
  - Total: 18,673
- Time zone: UTC+6 (BST)

Lunesshor Union (Bengali: লুনেশ্বর ইউনিয়ন) is a union parishad under Atpara Upazila of Netrokona District in northern Bangladesh

== Geography ==
Union Parishads in Atpara Upazila
U:union parishads
Owing to space constraints in the small map, the actual locations in a larger map may vary slightly

Duoj Union has a total area of 8,512 acres (3,445 ha).

== Demographics ==
According to the 2022 Bangladeshi census, Lunesshor Union had 4,393 households with a total population of 18,673 of which 9,138 were males and 9,533 females. Muslims numbered 17,384 , Hindus 1,283.

Lunesshor Union had a literacy rate of 38.8%.
