= Baniyajan Union, Atpara =

Baniajan Union, Atpara বানিয়াজান ইউনিয়ন, আটপাড়া
- Location in Bangladesh
- Coordinates: 24.783937°N 90.865327°E
- Country: Bangladesh
- Division: Mymensingh Division
- District: Netrokona District
- Upazila: Atpara Upazila

Population
  - Total: 22,222
- Time zone: UTC+6 (BST)

Baniajan Union, Atpara (Bengali: বানিয়াজান ইউনিয়ন, আটপাড়া) is a union parishad under Atpara Upazila of Netrokona District in northern Bangladesh.

== History ==
During the rule of the Hindu rulers, the area known in later days as the eastern part of Mymensingh district, was covered with thick forests and was ruled by Koch, Hajong and Garo people, Towards the end of the 13th century, Baisya Garo ruled over the area. In the Muslim era, around the 14th century, the area west of the Meghna River was called the Bhati region. After the ascent of the independent late medieval Sultan of the Bengal Sultanate, Alauddin Husain Shah in 1498, the Mymensingh area came under Muslim rule.

== Geography ==
Union Parishads in Atpara Upazila
U:union parishads
Owing to space constraints in the small map, the actual locations in a larger map may vary slightly

Baniajan Union has a total area of 6,050 acres (2,450 ha).

Magra River flows past Baniajan Union.

=== Bhati (region) ===
Baniyajan Union lies in the Bhati (region) which covers the low-lying areas of the greater districts of Dhaka, Mymensingh, Tippera (Comilla) and Sylhet, as defined from the days of the Mughal Emperors Akbar and Jahangir.

== Demographics ==
According to the 2022 Bangladeshi census, Baniajan Union had 5,271 households and had a total population of 22,222, of which males numbered 10,872 and females numbered 11,350. Muslims numbered 20,183, Hindus 2,023 .

Baniajan Union had a literacy rate of 47.6%.
