= Chiram =

Chiram may refer to:

- Chiram (film), 2026 Indian Malayalam-language film
- Chiram Union, Netrokona District, northern Bangladesh
- Erich Brauer, German artist also known as Erich Chiram Brauer, who often signed his art work "Chiram".
- The Chirams, characters in the science fiction series Super Dimension Century Orguss
