= Barhatta Union =

Barhatta Union বারহাট্টা ইউনিয়ন
- Location in Bangladesh
- Coordinates: 24.908875°N 90.865387°E
- Country: Bangladesh
- Division: Mymensingh Division
- District: Netrokona District
- Upazila: Barhatta Upazila

Population (2022)
  - Total: 36,151
- Time zone: UTC+6 (BST)

Barhatta Union (Bengali: বারহাট্টা ইউনিয়ন) is a union parishad under Barhatta Upazila of Netrokona District in northern Bangladesh

== Geography ==
Barhatta Union has a total area of 8,604 acres (3,482 ha).

== Demographics ==
According to the 2022 Bangladeshi census, Barhatta Union had 8,339 households and had a total population of 36,151 of which males numbered 17,954 and females numbered 18,197. Muslims numbered 30,667, Hindus 5,476. Barhatta Union had a literacy rate of 47.9 %.

== Villages ==
A union council or a rural council, rural union, simply union, is the smallest rural administrative and local government unit in Bangladesh,

Mouzas (villages in Barhatta Union with a population exceeding 2,000 in 2022 Bangladesh census were (population in brackets): Bari (5,059), Bikramsree(3,284), Bri Kalika (3,230), Gobindapur (2,216) and Islampur (4,071).

== Civic facilities ==
Bangladesh census 2022 provides information about various facilities availed by people. Here the information for the union is provided. The page number in brackets after the information is the page of the census report on which it is available.

In Barhatta Union, 66.51% of the population above 15 years and above have a mobile phone for their use. 22.42% of the population above years are internet users. (page 661). 21.28% of the population are having account in financial institution,bank/ insurance/micro-credit/post office etc. 40.93% of the population are having mobile account. (page713}. In Barhatta Union, 91.14 % of the population are having their own dwelling unit - 75.04% have kancha structures, 4.84% have pucca structures and 0.90% live in jhupries. (page768). In Barhata Union, 99.00% have electricity coverage. 70.59 % use wood/chalk/ chopped wood as cooking fuel, 11.93% use wood-coal/ charcoal/ dried dung. (page 928)
