= Sukhari Union =

Sukhari Union সুখারী ইউনিয়ন
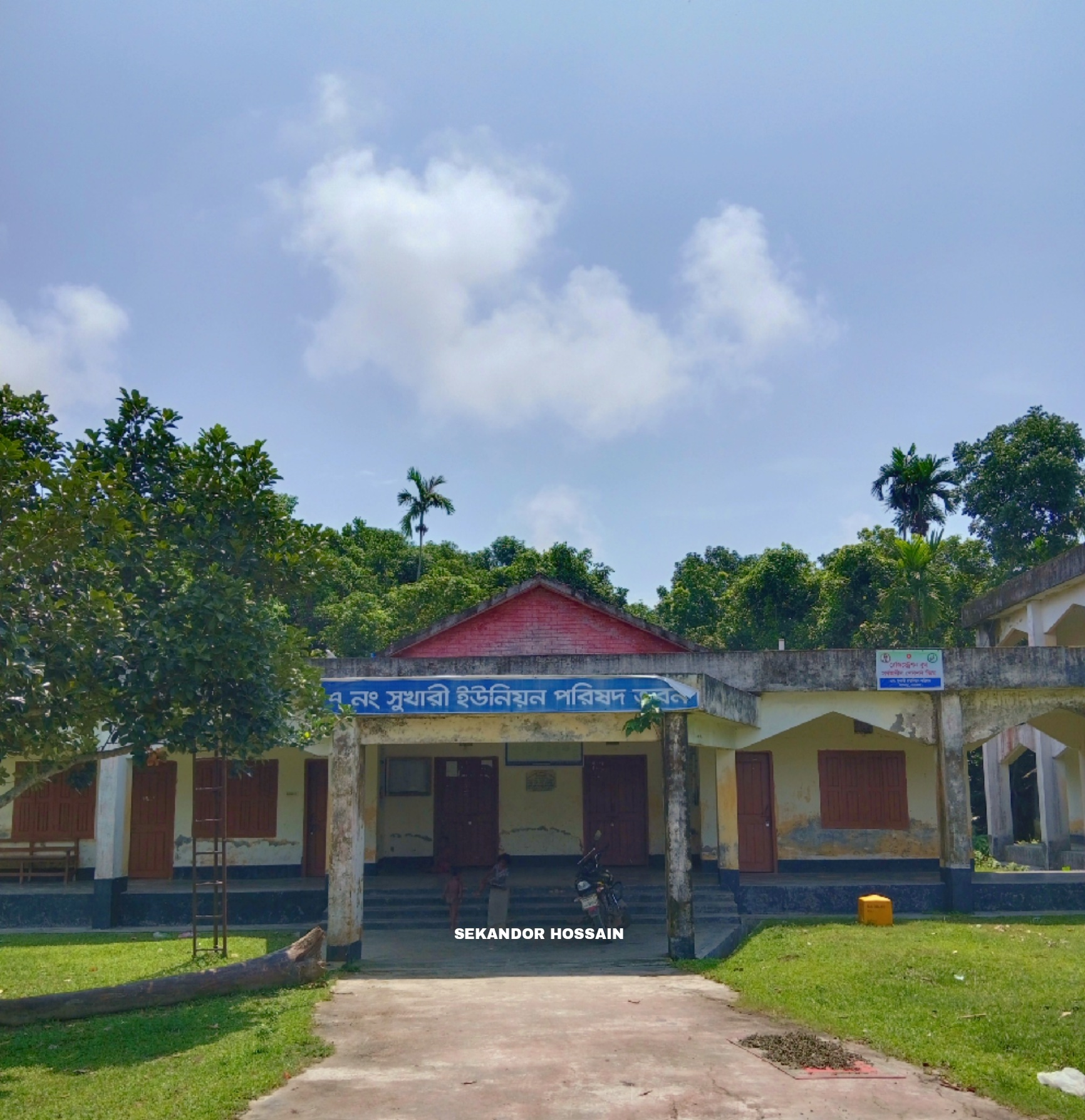
- Sukhari Union Council

- Location in Bangladesh
- Coordinates: 24.810069°N 90.868878°E
- Country: Bangladesh
- Division: Mymensingh Division
- District: Netrokona District
- Upazila: Atpara Upazila

Population
  - Total: 18,665
- Time zone: UTC+6 (BST)

Sukhari Union (Bengali: সুখারী ইউনিয়ন) is a union parishad under Atpara Upazila of Netrokona District in northern Bangladesh

== Geography ==
Union Parishads in Atpara Upazila
U:union parishads
Owing to space constraints in the small map, the actual locations in a larger map may vary slightly

Sukhari Union has a total area of 7,271 acres (2,942 ha).

== Demographics ==
According to the 2022 Bangladeshi census, Sukhari Union had 4.449 households and had a total population of 19,176 of which males numbered 9,451 and females numbered 97,23. Muslims numbered 17,399, Hindus 1,775.

Sukhari Union had a literacy rate of 35.0%.
