= Shunoi Union =

Shunoi Union শুনই ইউনিয়ন
- Location in Bangladesh
- Coordinates: 24.840054°N 90.868760°E
- Country: Bangladesh
- Division: Mymensingh Division
- District: Netrokona District
- Upazila: Atpara Upazila

Population
  - Total: 18,665
- Time zone: UTC+6 (BST)

Shunoi Union (Bengali: শুনই ইউনিয়ন) is a union parishad under Atpara Upazila of Netrokona District in northern Bangladesh

== Geography ==
Union Parishads in Atpara Upazila
U:union parishads
Owing to space constraints in the small map, the actual locations in a larger map may vary slightly

Shunoi Union has a total area of 5,938 acres (2,403 ha).

== Demographics ==
According to the 2022 Bangladeshi census, Shunoi Union had 4,325 households and had a total population of 18,665 of which males numbered 9,029 and females numbered 9,630. Muslims numbered 17,669, Hindus 996.

Shunoi Union had a literacy rate of 38.6%.
