= Asma Union =

Asma Union আসমা ইউনিয়ন
- Location in Bangladesh
- Coordinates: 24.900934°N 90.900063°E
- Country: Bangladesh
- Division: Mymensingh Division
- District: Netrokona District
- Upazila: Barhatta Upazila

Population (2022)
  - Total: 21,370
- Time zone: UTC+6 (BST)

Asma Union (Bengali: আসমা ইউনিয়ন) is a union parishad under Barhatta Upazila of Netrokona District in northern Bangladesh

== Geography ==
Asma Union has a total area of 7,353 acres (2,976 ha).

== Demographics ==
According to the 2022 Bangladeshi census, Asma Union had 4,893 households and had a total population of 21,370 of which males numbered 10,541 and females numbered 10,825 Muslims numbered 20,194, Hindus 1,174.

Asma Union had a literacy rate of 32.2 %.

== Villages ==
A union council or a rural council, rural union, simply union, is the smallest rural administrative and local government unit in Bangladesh,

Mouzas (villages in Asma Union with a population exceeding 1,000 in 2022 Bangladesh census census were (population in brackets): Chhaygaon (1,438), Chhota Kailati (2,505), Gabarkanda (1,674), Goral (1,385), Gumuria (1,332), Hariatala (2,061), Rohua (1,033) and Ujangaon (2,529).

== Civic facilities ==
Bangladesh census 2022 provides information about various facilities availed by people. Here the information for the union is provided. The page number in brackets after the information is the page of the census report on which it is available.

In Asma Union, 66.2% of the population above 15 years have a mobile phone for their use. 16.4% of the population above 15 years are internet users. (page 661). 10.59% of the population are having account in financial institution, bank/ insurance/micro-credit/post office etc. 39.59% of the population are having mobile account. (page 713}. In Asma Union, 98.54% of the population are having their own dwelling unit - 92.39% have kancha structures, 0.90% have pucca structures and 0.51% live in jhupries. (page768). In Asma Union, 99.36% have electricity coverage. 72.31% use wood/chalk/ chopped wood as cooking fuel, 23.28% use wood-coal/ charcoal/ dried dung. (page 928)
