= Singhdha Union =

Singhdha Union সিংধা ইউনিয়ন
- Location in Bangladesh
- Coordinates: 24.871708°N 90.971343°E
- Country: Bangladesh
- Division: Mymensingh Division
- District: Netrokona District
- Upazila: Barhatta Upazila

Population (2022)
  - Total: 25,803
- Time zone: UTC+6 (BST)

Singhdha Union (Bengali: সিংধা ইউনিয়ন) is a union parishad under Barhatta Upazila of Netrokona District in northern Bangladesh

== Geography ==
Singhdha Union has a total area of 8,835 acres (3,575 ha).

== Demographics ==
According to the 2022 Bangladeshi census, Singhdha Union had 6,055 households with a total population of 25,803 of which 12,821 were male and 12,981 female. Muslims numbered 23,317, Hindus 2,484.

Singhdha Union had a literacy rate of 34.5 %.

== Civic facilities ==
Bangladesh census 2022 provides information about various facilities availed by people. Here the information for the union is provided. The page number in brackets after the information is the page of the census report on which it is available.

In Singhdha, 63.99 % of the population above 15 years and above have a mobile phone for their use. 20.69 % of the population above years are internet users. (page 665). 16.72 % of the population are having account in financial institution, bank/ insurance/micro-credit/post office etc. 35.43 % of the population are having mobile account. (page717}. In Singhdha Union, 97.05 % of the population are having their own dwelling unit - 88.0% have kancha structures, 1.53 % have pucca structures and 0.68% live in jhupries. (page772). In Singhdha Union, 99.22% have electricity coverage. 91.28 % use wood/chalk/ chopped wood as cooking fuel, 2.37 % use wood-coal/ charcoal/ dried dung. (page 932)
