= Huliya =

Huliya may refer to:

- Huliya (film), 1996 Indian Kannada-language film
- Huliya (poem), 1970 poem by Nirmalendu Goon
