= Teligati Union =

Teligati Union may refer to:

- Teligati Union, Atpara in Netrakona District, Bangladesh
- Teligati Union, Morrelganj jn Bagerhat District, Bangladesh
