= Nirmalendu Goon =

Bangladeshi poet (born 1945)

- নির্মলেন্দু গুণ
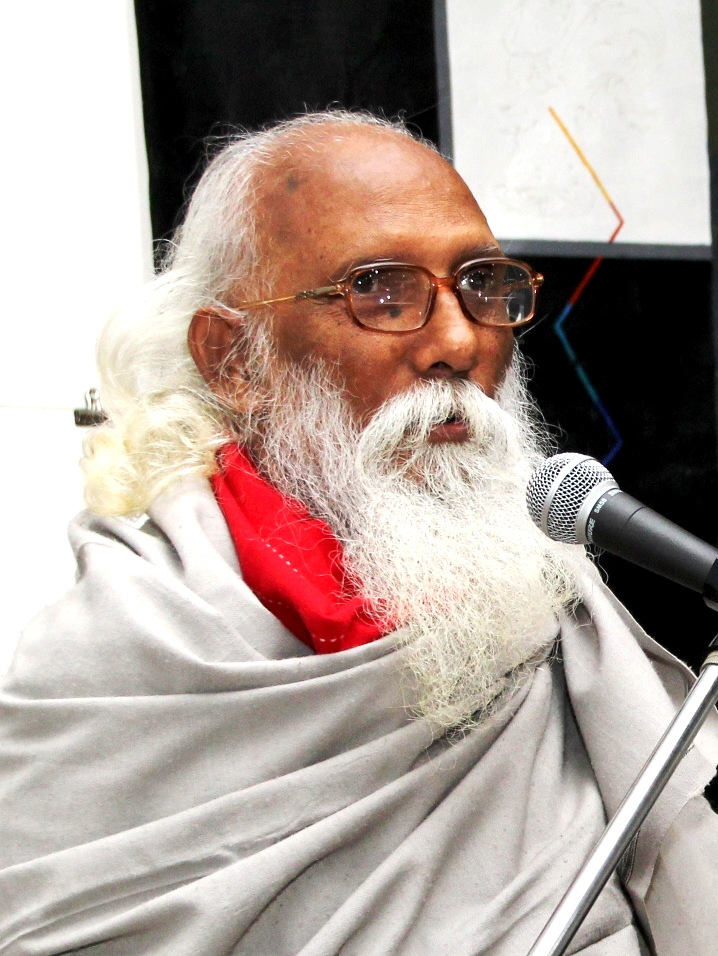
- Goon in Dhaka (2016)
- Born: 21 June 1945 (age 80); Kashban, Barhatta, Netrokona, Bengal Province, British India
- Occupation: poet

Nirmalendu Goon (born 21 June 1945) is a Bangladeshi poet known for his accessible verse. He was awarded Ekushey Padak in 2001 and Independence Day Award by the Government of Bangladesh in 2016. He was also awarded the Bangla Academy Literary Award in 1982.

== Early life and education ==
Goon was born in a Bengali Kayastha family of Kasban village, Barhatta Upazila, Netrokona District to Shukhendu Prakash Goon Chowdhury and Binaponi. He passed the Matriculation examination in 1962 and Intermediate examination in 1964 from Netrokona College. In 1969, he earned his bachelor of arts degree. He published his poem Notun Kandari on the magazine Uttor Akash. On 21 February 1965, he published the poem Kono Ek Sangramir Drishtite on the magazine Weekly Janata.

== Poetry ==
Goon's first book of poetry, Premanghshur Rokto Chai, was published in 1970. Since then he has published forty-five collections of poetry and twenty collections of prose. Part of the generation of poets of 1960s, Goon's poetry contains stinging criticism of the nouveau riche and a touching description of the contrasting fate of the masses. A love of freedom and faith in the human spirit also permeates many of his poems. An avowed Marxist, Goon has also written poems urging an upheaval of the poor against the rich. He also has written a number of poems on important personalities, including Rabindranath, Sheikh Mujibur Rahman (Huliya), Lenin, Shakti Chattopadhyay and others.

Goon wrote three autobiographical books - Amar Chhelebela, Amar Konthhoshor and Atma Kotha 1971.

The Library of Congress has a collection of thirty-seven titles by Goon. Goon was among the five Bangladeshi poets who took part at the Gothenburg Book Fair '13 in Sweden with their publications.

== Painting ==
Goon's solo painting exhibition opened in July 2009 at Shahbagh in Dhaka.

== Selected works ==
- Premāṃśura rakta cāi (1970)
- Nā premika, nā biplabi (1972)
- Caitrera bhālobāsa (1975)
- Tāra āge cāi samājatantra (1979)
- Pr̥thibījoṛā gāna (1982)
- Dūra ha duḥśāsana (1983)
- Cirakālera bām̐śi (1986)
- Nirañjanera pr̥thibi (1986)
- Nirguṇera jārṇāla (1987)
- Nirmalendu Guṇera premera kabita (1987)
- Nirmalendu Guṇera rājanaitika kabitā (1989)
- Yakhana āmi bukera pān̐jara khule dān̐rāi (1989)
- Dhābamāna hariṇera dyuti (1992)
- Kābyasamagra (1992-1993)
- Gīnasabārgera saṅge (1994)
- Ānandaudyāna (1995)
- Pañcāśa sahasra barsha (1995)
- Priẏa nārī hārāno kabitā (1996)
- Gadyasamagra (1997)
- Raktajharā Nabhembara 1975 (1997)
- Śaktismr̥ti o anyānya (1997)
- Śiẏare Bāṃlādeśa (1998)
- Nāma diẏechi bhālobāsa (1998)
- Nirbācita (2000)
- Racanā 2000 (2001)
- Selected poems of Nirmalendu Goon (2001)
- Muthophone'r Kabbo (2003)
- Bhrami deśe deśe (2004)
- Atma Katha 1971 (2008)
- Mujibmongol (2012)
- Cricket Shomogro (2012)

== Personal life ==
Goon has a daughter, Mrittika Goon.
