= Government College of Commerce, Chittagong =

College in Bangladesh

Coordinates: 22.3273°N 91.8174°E

Government College of Commerce, Chattogram
- সরকারি কমার্স কলেজ, চট্টগ্রাম
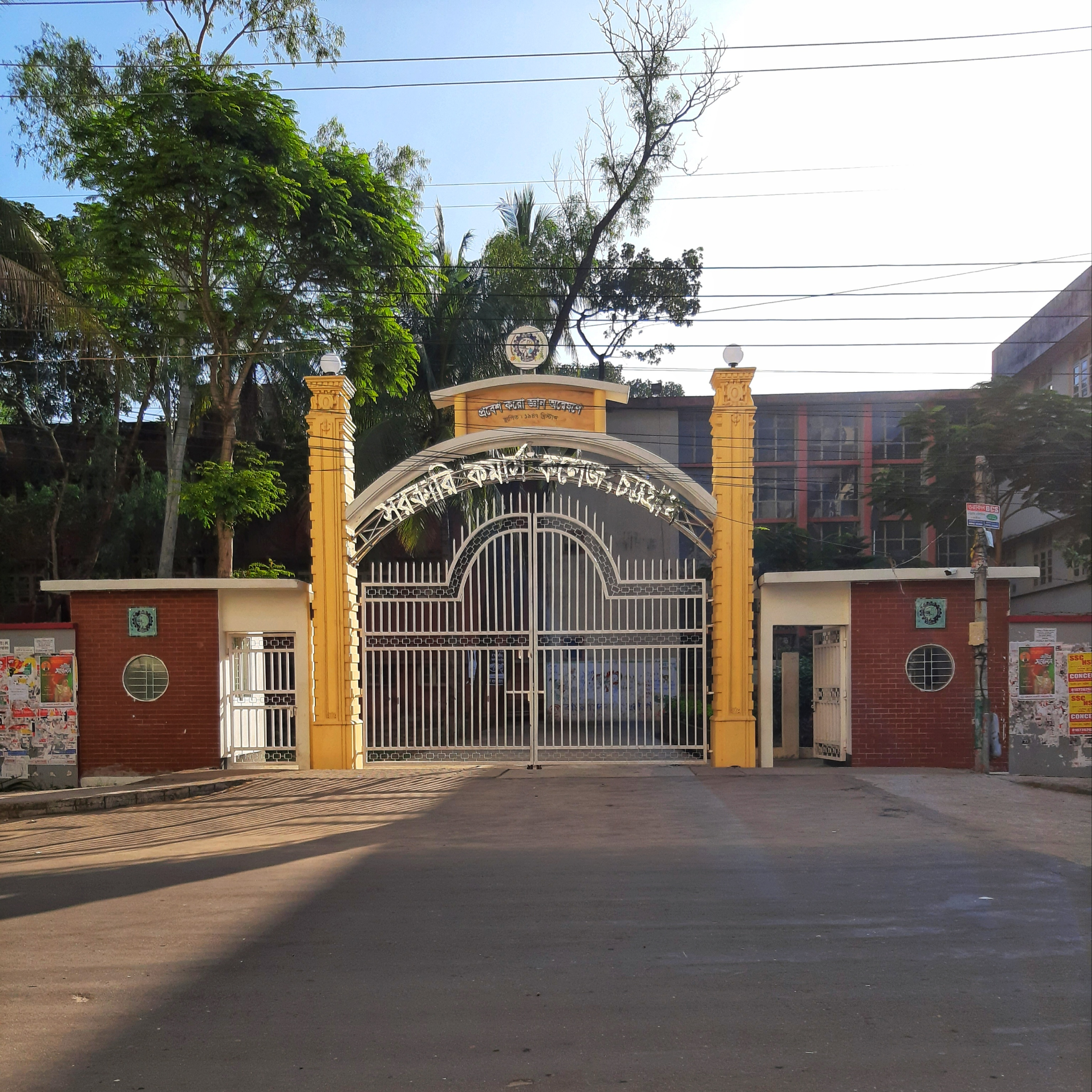
- সরকারি কমার্স কলেজের প্রবেশদ্বার
- Motto: প্রবেশ কর জ্ঞানের অন্বেষণে
- Motto in English: Enter In Search of Knowledge
- Type: Public
- Established: 1947; 79 years ago
- Affiliations: Board of Intermediate and Secondary Education, Chattogram
- Principal: Prof. Abdus Salam Howlader
- Vice-Principal: Prof. Mohammad Fakhrul Mawla
- Academic staff: 33+
- Administrative staff: 49+
- Students: Approximate 7,500
- Location: Agrabad, Chattogram, Bangladesh
- Campus: Urban, 5.16 acres (2.09 ha)
- Language: Bangla, English
- Colors: White, black, green
- Website: gcom.edu.bd

Government College of Commerce, Chattogram is a government college in Agrabad, Chattogram, Bangladesh. It was established in 1947.

== History ==
As a part of Govt. Commercial Institute, this college was built in 1947 in East Pakistan (now Bangladesh).

== Notable alumni ==
- Shawkat Osman
- Mustafa Kamal (politician)
- Saifuzzaman Chowdhury
- Shamsul Haque Chowdhury
- Nizam Uddin Hazari
- Asheq Ullah Rafiq
- Moslem Uddin
- Mustafizur Rahman Siddiqi
- Abdul Mannan (educator)
- M. A. Hashem
