= Madan Upazila =

Upazila in Netrakona district of Mymensingh Division, Bangladesh

Madan মদন
- Upazila
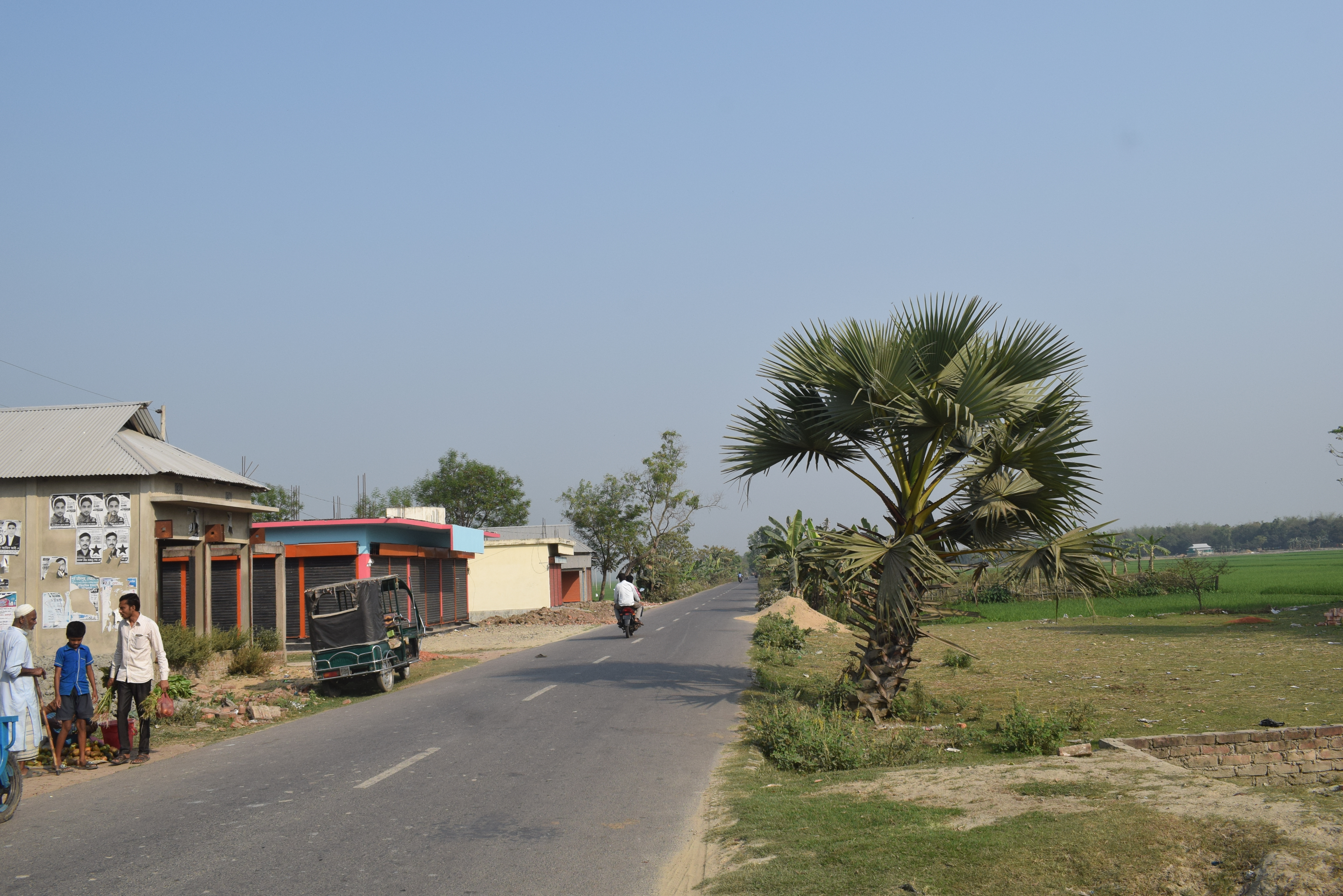
- A road in Madan Upazila

- Coordinates: 24°43′N 90°58′E
- Country: Bangladesh
- Division: Mymensingh
- District: Netrokona

Area
  - Total: 225.85 km^{2} (87.20 sq mi)

Population (2022)
  - Total: 149,878
  - Density: 663.62/km^{2} (1,718.8/sq mi)
- Time zone: UTC+6 (BST)
- Postal code: 2490
- Area code: 09529
- Website: madan.netrokona.gov.bd

Madan (Bengali: মদন) is an upazila of Netrokona District in the Division of Mymensingh, Bangladesh.

== Geography ==
Madan is located at 24.7167°N 90.9667°E. It has 21,808 households and total area 225.85 km^{2}. It is bounded by Atpara and Mohanganj upazilas on the north, Itna and Tarail upazilas on the south, Khaliajuri upazila on the east, Kendua upazila on the west.

== Demographics ==
Historical population
Year	Pop.	±%
1981	103,826	—
1991	117,613	+13.3%
2001	142,072	+20.8%
2011	154,479	+8.7%
2022	149,878	−3.0%
Source: Bangladesh Bureau of Statistics

Religions in Madan Upazila (2022)
Religion	Percent
Islam	93.75%
Hinduism	6.24%
Other or not stated	0.01%

According to the 2022 Bangladeshi census, Madan Upazila had 34,921 households and a population of 149,878. 11.19% of the population were under 5 years of age. Madan had a literacy rate (age 7 and over) of 59.28%: 60.31% for males and 58.29% for females, and a sex ratio of 98.23 males for 100 females. 23,723 (15.83%) lived in urban areas.

== Administration ==
Madan Thana was formed in 1917 and it was turned into an upazila in 1983.

Madan Upazila is divided into Madan Municipality and eight union parishads: Fatehpur, Gobindasree, Chandgaon, Kaitail, Madan, Maghan, Nayekpur, and Tiasree. The union parishads are subdivided into 84 mauzas and 114 villages.

Madan Municipality is subdivided into 9 wards and 11 mahallas.

== See also ==
- Upazilas of Bangladesh
- Districts of Bangladesh
- Divisions of Bangladesh

== Gallery ==
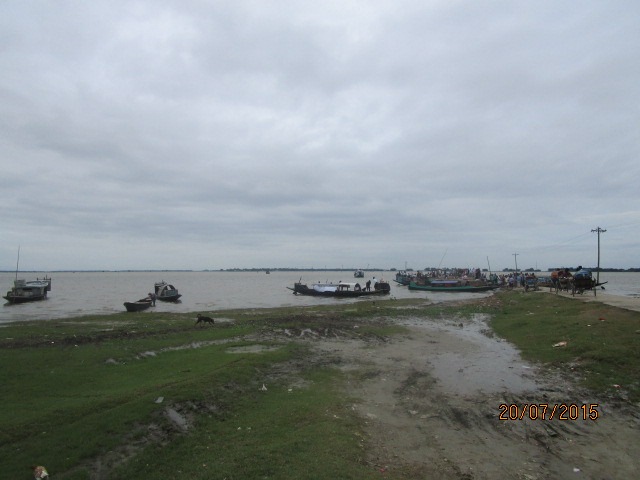
Uchitpur Ghat at Madan.

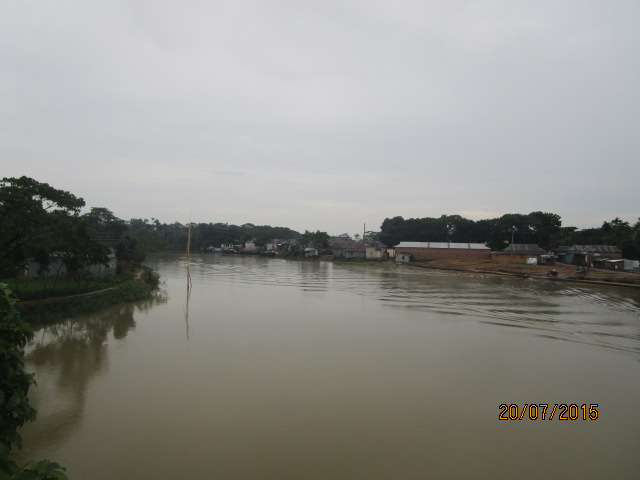
Mogra River from the bridge at Madan Upazila.
