= Bulbon Osman =

- Born: 18 March 1940 (age 86); Jhamtia, Howrah, Bengal Presidency, British India (now in West Bengal, India)
- Education: University of Dhaka
- Relatives: Shawkat Osman (father); Yeafesh Osman (brother)
- Awards: Bangla Academy Literary Award (1973)

Bulbon Osman (born 18 March 1940) is a Bangladeshi academic, writer and artist. He was conferred Bangla Academy Literary Award in 1973 for his contribution in juvenile literature.

== Early life and education ==
Osman was born on 18 March 1940 at his maternal house at Jhamatia in Howrah. He is the eldest son of Shawkat Osman and Saleha Osman. His brother Yeafesh Osman is the incumbent minister of Ministry of Science and Technology.

Osman's paternal house is situated at Sabalsinghapur in Hooghly. His family moved to Chittagong in 1950. After completing school and college life from there he got admitted into University of Dhaka. He was a student of the sociology department of the institution.

== Career ==
Osman was appointed as a lecturer of the art related sociology at East Pakistan College of Arts and Crafts in 1966. His first book is Kanama which was published in 1967. It was a teen novel. He worked in Swadhin Bangla Betar Kendra in 1971.

Osman worked as a professor in Institute of Fine Arts from 1995 to 2007. He is a self-educated artist. He involved in translating books too.

== Awards and recognition ==
Osman was awarded Bangla Academy Literary Award in 1973 for his contribution in juvenile literature.
