= Barhatta Upazila =

Barhatta বারহাট্টা
- Upazila
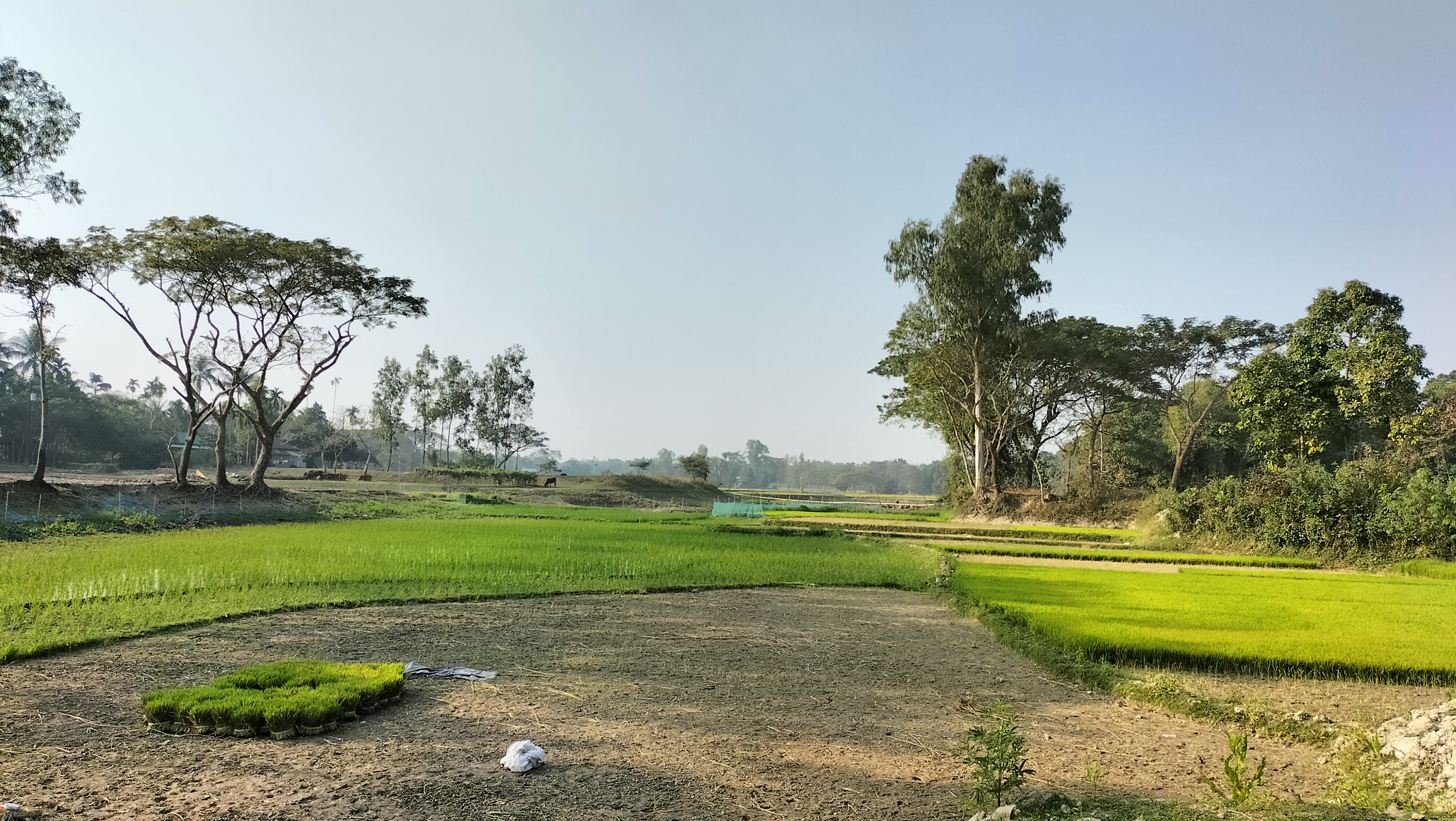
- Kaunai river in Bamongaon, Barhatta

- Coordinates: 24°54′N 90°52.5′E
- Country: Bangladesh
- Division: Mymensingh
- District: Netrokona

Government
  - MP (Netrokona-2): Ashraf Ali Khan Khasru
  - Upazila Chairman: Muhammad Mynul Hoque Kashem

Area
  - Total: 221.5 km^{2} (85.5 sq mi)

Population (2022)
  - Total: 182,211
  - Density: 822.6/km^{2} (2,131/sq mi)
- Time zone: UTC+6 (BST)
- Postal code: 2440
- Website: http://barhatta.netrokona.gov.bd/

Barhatta Upazila mauza geocode map

Barhatta (Bengali: বারহাট্টা) is an upazila of Netrokona District, located in Bangladesh's Mymensingh Division.

== History ==
The area that is now known today as Barhatta was a part of the Mughal Empire in the seventeenth century. One example of a remnant from this historical period includes an old Mughal building in Saudpur which is currently in dilapidated condition. In 1763, many members of the anti-colonial Pagal Panthi movement, led by Tipu Shah, stationed themselves in different areas around modern-day Barhatta. They set up a central barracks near a village named Borohati/Boruhati/Bouhati. The British troops, in search of a safe haven, founded Brahatta, another village in imitation of Barohati's name, which facilitated river communication. Although Brahatta is now known as Barhatta, the nameplate of the Barhatta railway station bears the memory of the previous name, Brahatta. This village is currently adjacent to Barhatta bazaar. On 15 June 1906, the Eastern Bengal and Assam government issued gazette 6676J which notified the establishment of a thana in Barhatta; whose construction was funded by Radhanath Kar Gang. In 1914, the Barhatta CKP High School was opened. Maulvi Tahjibuddin Ahmad was made the Sub-Registrar of Bhaluka on 4 August 1927, replacing Maulvi Abdul Wahed Ahmad.

During the Bangladesh Liberation War of 1971, the Mukti Bahini launched a surprise attack on the police station in Mohanganj, causing the Pakistan Army to retreat towards Barhatta. The freedom fighters of Barhatta blew up the Thakurkona Railway Bridge in western Barhatta which disrupted the Pakistan Army from entering. Near the end of the war, a brawl took place in the Barhatta Police Station, leading to the death of civilians. Barhatta was liberated on 8 December 1971. The road from Barhatta to Chandrapur was renamed to Shahid Muqshid Mian Road in honour of Muqshid Mian, a Bengali Muslim freedom fighter who died in the war. In 1983, the thana was upgraded to an upazila (sub-district).

In 2009, BAPEX conducted two-dimensional seismic surveys, discovering a gas field now known as the Sunetra Gas Field.

== Geography ==
Barhatta is located at 24.9000°N 90.8750°E and located on the banks of the Kangsha River close to the haor areas. Barhatta Upazila has an area of 221.50 km^{2} . It is bounded by Kalmakanda and Dharamapasha in the north, Atpara and Mohanganj to the south and Netrokona Sadar to its west.

== Demographics ==
Historical population
Year	Pop.	±%
1981	115,234	—
1991	142,174	+23.4%
2001	158,133	+11.2%
2011	180,449	+14.1%
2022	182,190	+1.0%
Source: Bangladesh Bureau of Statistics

Religions in Barhatta Upazila (2022)
Religion	Percent
Islam	90.35%
Hinduism	9.63%
Other or not stated	0.02%

According to the 2022 Bangladeshi census, Barhatta Upazila had 41,905 households and a population of 182,211. 10.73% of the population were under 5 years of age. Barhatta had a literacy rate (age 7 and over) of 64.42%: 65.09% for males and 63.76% for females, and a sex ratio of 97.45 males for 100 females. 11,687 (6.41%) lived in urban areas.

== Administration ==
Barhatta, formed as a Thana in 1905, was turned into an upazila in 1983.

Barhatta Upazila is divided into seven union parishads: Asma, Barhatta, Baushi, Chiram, Raypur, Sahata, and Singdha. The union parishads are subdivided into 147 mauzas and 239 villages.

=== Upazila chairmen ===
List of chairmen
Name	Term
Abd al-Qadir Khan	1985 - 1990
Mustafizur Rahman Khan Rizvi	1990 - 1991
Muhammad Mynul Hoque Kashem	Present

== Tourism ==
In addition to the old Mughal buildings in Saudpur and Amghail Court Bari, there is also an ancient twin-pond in the village of Amghail-Pirijpur. There are also the mausoleums of Sohag Pir in Kailati and Nazar Ali Faqir in Premnagar.

== Notable people ==
- Md. Innas Ali, Physicist
- Nirmalendu Goon, Poet

== See also ==
- Upazilas of Bangladesh
- Divisions of Bangladesh
