= Yafes Osman =

Bangladeshi architect and politician

Yeafesh Osman
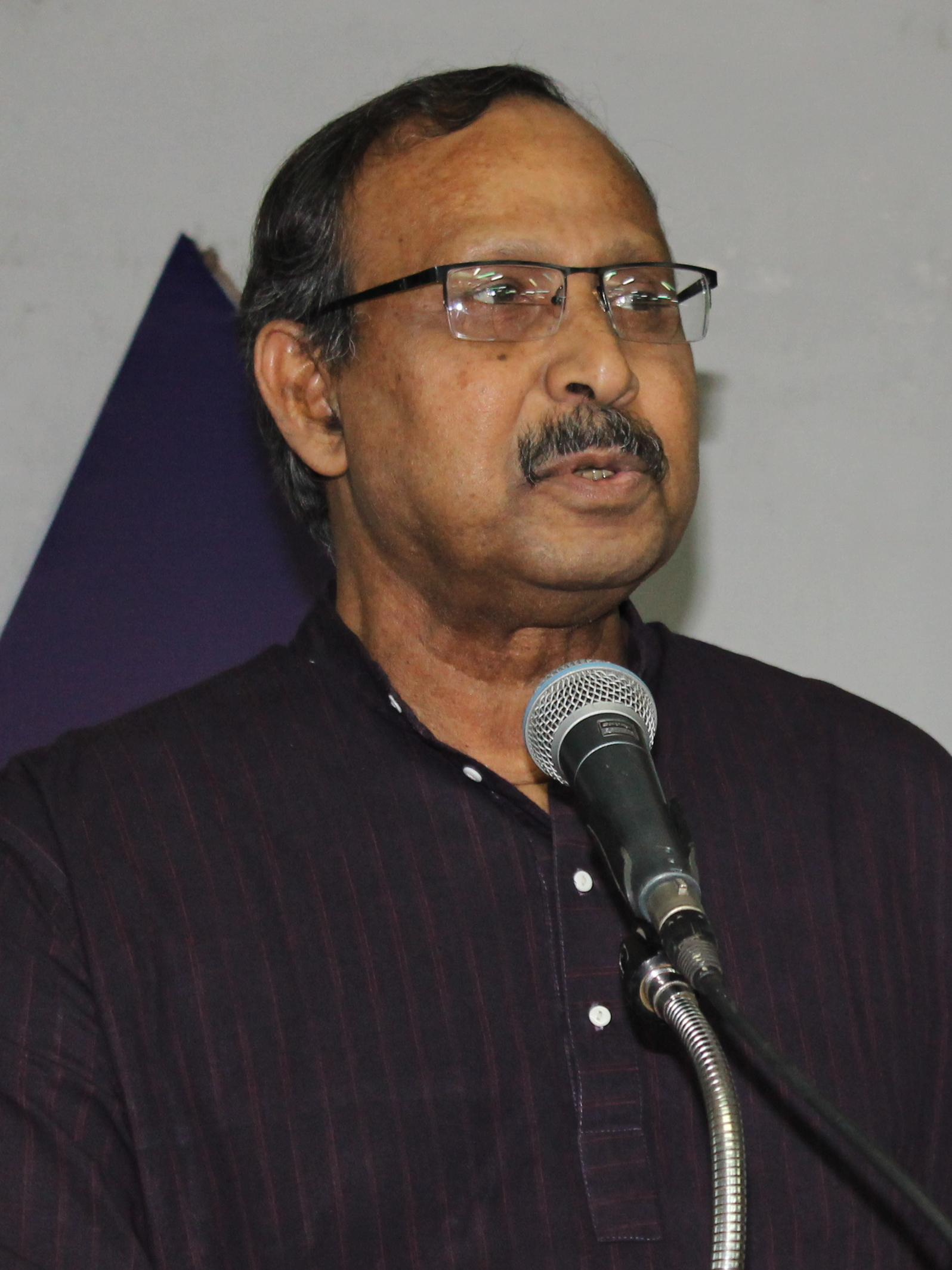
- Osman in 2013

Minister of Science and Technology
- In office 14 July 2015 – 5 August 2024
- Prime Minister: Sheikh Hasina

State Minister of Science and Technology
- In office 12 January 2014 – 14 July 2015

Personal details
- Born: 1 May 1946 (age 80) Chittagong, Bengal Province, British India
- Party: Bangladesh Awami League
- Parent: Shawkat Osman (father)
- Education: Bangladesh University of Engineering and Technology
- Occupation: Politician
- Profession: Architect

Yeafesh Osman (born 1 May 1946) is a Bangladeshi architect and politician and the former Minister of Science and Technology of the government of Bangladesh since 2015. He worked under Fazlur Rahman Khan, the notable architect of Sears Tower.

== Early life and education ==
Osman was born in Chittagong in 1946 to novelist Shawkat Osman. His brother, Bulbon Osman, is an artist and writer. He studied at Chittagong Muslim High School and later passed his Secondary School Certificate and Higher Secondary School Certificate examinations from Siddheswari Boys' High School and Notre Dame College, Dhaka respectively. He completed his graduation in architecture from Bangladesh University of Engineering and Technology.

== Career ==
Osman was elected as the vice president of the Engineering University Central Students' Union in 1970. He got involved in politics as a member of the Bangladesh Chhatra League. Later, he joined the Awami League and became its science and technology secretary. Osman was a freedom fighter who fought in sector 2 during the Bangladesh Liberation War of 1971.

Osman served as an architect in the government's Housing and Settlement Department from May 1972 to April 1974 and also worked as a junior architect under Fazlur Rahman Khan from October 1970 to April 1972. He was the founder secretary of the Institute of Architects Bangladesh. During his professional practice, worked as the managing director of Prakalpa Upadeshta Ltd, an architecture and engineering consultancy firm.

Osman was appointed as the State Minister of Science and Technology (Technocrat) in 2014 and then became cabinet minister on 14 July 2015.

Osman has published two books, Bongo Amar Janani Amar and Noshto Kal Koshto Kal.
