= Chiram Union =

Chiram Union চিরাম ইউনিয়ন
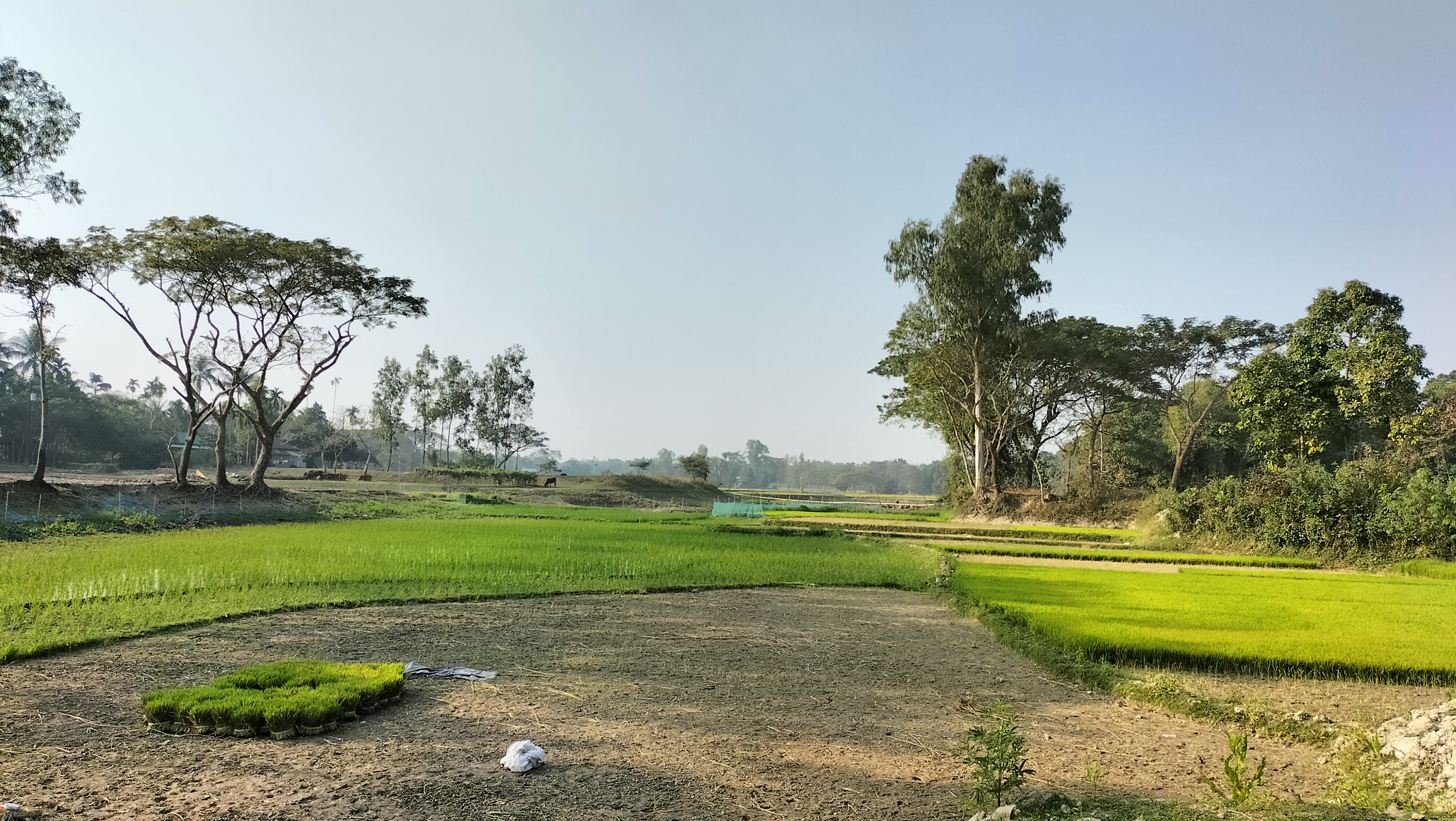
- Bamongaon in Chiram Union

- Location in Bangladesh
- Coordinates: 24.920974°N 90.886583°E
- Country: Bangladesh
- Division: Mymensingh Division
- District: Netrokona District
- Upazila: Barhatta Upazila

Population (2022)
  - Total: 18,279
- Time zone: UTC+6 (BST)

Chiram Union (Bengali: চিরাম ইউনিয়ন) is a union parishad under Barhatta Upazila of Netrokona District in northern Bangladesh

== History ==
During the rule of the Hindu rulers, the area, known in later days as the eastern part of Mymensingh district, was covered with thick forests and was ruled by Koch, Hajong and Garo people, Towards the end of the 13th century, Baisya Garo ruled over the area. In the Muslim era, around the 14th century, the area west of the Meghna River was called the Bhati region. After the ascent of the independent late medieval Sultan of the Bengal Sultanate, Alauddin Husain Shah in 1498, the Mymensingh area came under Muslim rule.

== Geography ==
Chiram Union has a total area of 7,223 acres (2,923 ha).

== Demographics ==
According to the 2022 Bangladeshi census, Chiram Union had 4,164 households and had a total population of 18,279 of which males numbered 9,067 and females numbered 9,212. Muslims numbered 16,625, Hindus1.652 . Chiram Union had a literacy rate of 30.4 %.

== Villages ==
A union council or a rural council, rural union, simply union, is the smallest rural administrative and local government unit in Bangladesh,

Mouzas (villages in Chiram Union with a population exceeding 2,000 in 2022 Bangladesh census were (population in brackets): Chhiiram (5,330) and Naihati (2,396).

== Civic facilities ==
Bangladesh census 2022 provides information about various facilities availed by people. Here the information for the union is provided. The page number in brackets after the information is the page of the census report on which it is available.

In Chiram Union, 62.58% of the population above 15 years and above have a mobile phone for their use. 14.51% of the population above years are internet users. (page 663). 21.41% of the population are having account in financial institution, bank/ insurance/micro-credit/post office etc. 42.56 % of the population are having mobile account. (page715}. In Chiram Union, 98.53% of the population are having their own dwelling unit - 92.36% have kancha structures, 1.28% have pucca structures and 1.69% live in jhupries. (page770). In Chiram Union, 99.57% have electricity coverage. 88.91% use wood/chalk/ chopped wood as cooking fuel, 3.95% use wood-coal/ charcoal/ dried dung. (page 930)
