= Teligati Union, Atpara =

Telegati Union, Atpara তেলিগাতী ইউনিয়ন, আটপাড়া
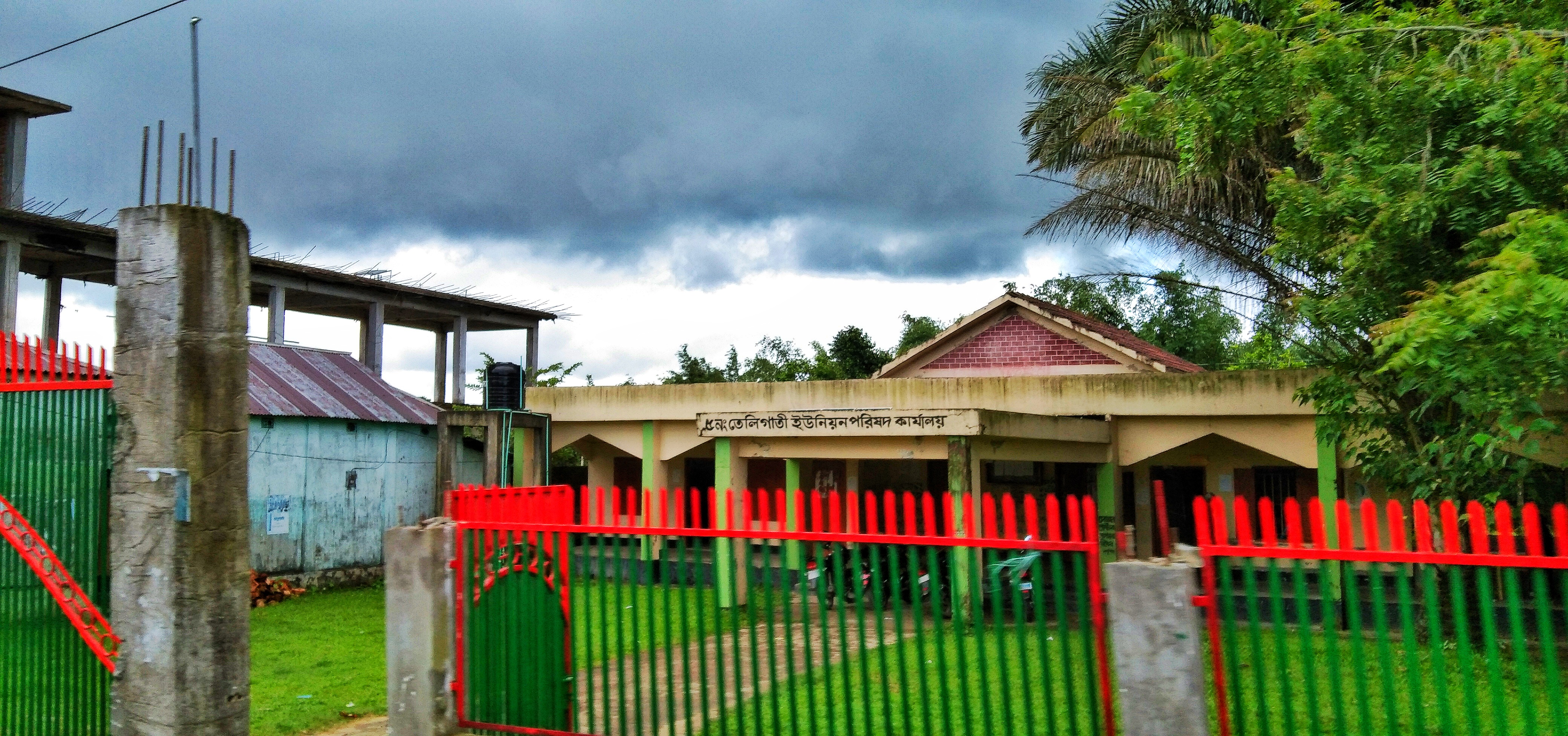
- Teligati Union Office

- Location in Bangladesh
- Coordinates: 24.769958°N 90.860817°E
- Country: Bangladesh
- Division: Mymensingh Division
- District: Netrokona District
- Upazila: Atpara Upazila

Population
  - Total: 18,665
- Time zone: UTC+6 (BST)

Teligati Union (Bengali: তেলিগাতী ইউনিয়ন) is a union parishad under Atpara Upazila of Netrokona District in northern Bangladesh

== Geography ==
Union Parishads in Atpara Upazila
U:union parishads
Owing to space constraints in the small map, the actual locations in a larger map may vary slightly

Teleghati Union has a total area of 6,359 acres (2,573 ha)..

== Demographics ==
According to the 2022 Bangladeshi census, Teligati Union had 5,967 households and had a total population of 24,110 of which males numbered 11,608 and females numbered 12,491. Muslims numbered 21,319, Hindus 2,787.

Teligati Union had a literacy rate of 37.6%.
