= Raypur Union, Barhatta =

Raypur Union রায়পুর ইউনিয়ন
- Location in Bangladesh
- Coordinates: 24.871594°N 90.971368°E
- Country: Bangladesh
- Division: Mymensingh Division
- District: Netrokona District
- Upazila: Barhatta Upazila

Population (2022)
  - Total: 25,452
- Time zone: UTC+6 (BST)

Raypur Union (Bengali: রায়পুর ইউনিয়ন) is a union parishad under Barhatta Upazila of Netrokona District in northern Bangladesh

== Geography ==
Raypur Union has a total area of 7,814 acres (3,162 ha).

== Demographics ==
According to the 2022 Bangladeshi census, Raypur Union had 5,755 households and had a total population of 25,452 of which males numbered 12,501 and females numbered 12,950. Muslims numbered 23,519, Hindus 1,927.

Raypur Union had a literacy rate of 38.0 %.

== Civic facilities ==
Bangladesh census 2022 provides information about various facilities availed by people. Here the information for the union is provided. The page number in brackets after the information is the page of the census report on which it is available.

In Raypur Union, 59.44% of the population above 15 years and above have a mobile phone for their use. % of the population above years are internet users. (page 663). 10.34% of the population are having account in financial institution, bank/ insurance/micro-credit/post office etc. 37.44 % of the population are having mobile account. (page715}. In Raypur Union, 97.85% of the population are having their own dwelling unit - 88.54% have kancha structures, 1.83% have pucca structures and 0.72% live in jhupries. (page770). In Raypur Union, 99.39% have electricity coverage. 87.61% use wood/chalk/ chopped wood as cooking fuel, 7.10 % use wood-coal/ charcoal/ dried dung. (page 930)
