= Raypur =

Raypur may refer to:

- Raypur, Kanpur Nagar
- Raypur, Bankura
