= Huliya (poem) =

1970 poem by Nirmalendu Goon

- by Nirmalendu Goon
- Original title: হুলিয়া
- Country: Bangladesh
- Language: Bengali
- Series: Premangshur Rokto Chai
- Subject: 1969 East Pakistan mass uprising
- Genre: Narrative
- Publisher: Alexandra Steam Machine Press
- Publication date: 1970
- Lines: 80
- ISBN: 9789849118718
- Followed by: Ashok Gacher Niche

"Huliya" is a Bengali-language Bangladeshi poem written by Nirmalendu Goon. It is included in his poetry book Premangshur Rokto Chai. Goon wrote it especially for Sheikh Mujibur Rahman, the first president of Bangladesh. It has 80 rhythmic lines. The poem described the events in East Pakistan during the 1969 Mass uprising.

== Background ==
This poem belongs to the collection of poetry Premanshur Rokto Chai. When Goon wrote the poem, he lived with Abul Hasan, another poet, at Salimullah Muslim Hall, University of Dhaka. Goon could not find the poem the day after he wrote it, until he left the hostel room and found it in tatters. Goon went to Abul Hasan, who insulted the poem and compared it to stories and asked him to rewrite the poem. Goon then rewrote the poem in the public library. When Goon read the poem to him after writing it for the second time, Hasan ate his words. His first poetry collection include the poem was initially rejected by several publishers; then, on July 21, 1970, he recited the poem at a function organized by the National Book Centre. Journalist Abdul Gaffar Chowdhury was present at the event and subsequently mentioned the name of the poem in a popular column in his newspaper. Moslem Khan, the owner of Khan Brothers Publication, inspired Goon to publish the book of poetry. The collection, along with the poem, was later published by Alexandra Steam Machine Press.

== Themes ==
The literal meaning of the word Huliya is a type of proclamation which is used to arrest the absconding accused. Such proclamation contains the name, identity and details of the fugitive. A political activist's escape from an arrest warrant during Pakistan's military rule is depicted here. In the Huliya poem, the poet established the then East Pakistani politician Sheikh Mujibur Rahman in a higher position through rhyme. In 1969, when the new political policy of the hero mentioned in the poem had a negative impact on the public, Goon raised doubts about the future of the Bengali nation in Pakistan, Ayub Khan's position in that situation and Sheikh Mujibur Rahman's decision in the poem.

== Analysis ==
Instead of writing in alphabetic rhyme or poetic rhyme, Goon here used a new type of rhyme where extra denotation exist. Poet Nasir Ahmed said that in this poem, the poet has wonderfully portrayed the disenfranchised East Pakistan. The text of the poem creates a series of fantastic imaginary scenes. The poem depicts a story rather than rhyme and is a narrative poem.

== Reception ==
Poet Nasir Ahmed wrote about the poem in his Somoyer Dolil book, "... Considering these socio-political and human consciousness, Huliya is a brilliant document of the time. And perhaps that is the reason why this poem brought great fame to the young poet at a young age. To know the nature of the 1969 revolution, Chilekotha Sepai of Akhteruzzaman Elias is inevitable, as well as the Huliya of Nirmalendu Goon, of course." Abdul Ghaffar Chowdhury in Daily Purbadesh referred to the poem as the best poem of the time and said that the poem met the needs of the time. Columnist Rafiqullah Khan feels that the publication of the poem proves responsibility of Goon as a poet to the society.

In the poem, the poet mentions his childhood friend Rafiz and his tea shop. Rafiz used to sell tea in the village of Goon. The poem mentions that his friend gave him less sugar in his tea and pretended not to know him. The villagers read the poem. Assumed it to be true, they forced Rafiz to answer. Rafiz later apologized to Goon despite not being guilty.

After learning about the poem through the newspaper, Sheikh Mujibur Rahman invited Nirmalendu Goon to his residence in Dhaka on March 25, 1971. He wanted to know why the poet doubted his decision in the poem. But Goon was unable to meet him on the night of March 25 as Mujib was arrested by the Pakistan Army after the launch of Operation Searchlight.

== In popular culture ==
In 1984, a film was produced in the same name based on the poem. Directed by Tanvir Mokammel, the film stars Asaduzzaman Noor in the lead role. It was the debut film of Humayun Faridi.
