= Shawkat Osman =

Bangladeshi writer (1917–1998)

- শওকত ওসমান
- Born: Sheikh Azizur Rahman; 2 January 1917; Sabalsinghapur, Hooghly, Bengal Presidency
- Died: 14 May 1998 (aged 81); Dhaka, Bangladesh
- Education: MA (Bengali)
- Alma mater: Aliah University; St. Xavier's College, Calcutta; University of Calcutta; Chittagong Commerce College
- Children: Yeafesh Osman
- Father: Sheikh Mohammad Yehia
- Awards: full list

Sheikh Azizur Rahman (Bengali: শেখ আজিজুর রহমান; 2 January 1917 – 14 May 1998), known as Shawkat Osman (Bengali: শওকত ওসমান), was a Bangladeshi novelist and short story writer. He won the Bangla Academy Literary Award in 1962, the Ekushey Padak in 1983 and the Independence Day Award in 1997.

== Early life and education ==
Shawkat Osman was born as Sheikh Azizur Rahman on 2 January 1917 to Sheikh Muhammad Yahya and Guljan Begum. He belonged to a Bengali Muslim Sheikh family from the village of SabalSinghapur, Hugli, West Bengal (সবল সিংহপুর, হুগলি, পশ্চিমবঙ্গ). He began his education at the local maktab and then enrolled at the Calcutta Alia Madrasa. However, he later transferred to the St. Xavier's College of the University of Calcutta where he received his BA in politics in 1938, and MA in Bengali in 1941.

== Career ==
He was a Professor by profession. Osman migrated to Chittagong, East Bengal (present-day Bangladesh) after the partition of Bengal in 1947. He started teaching at Chittagong Commerce College. He then served as a faculty member at Dhaka College during 1959–1972.

== Literature ==
Osman's first prominent novel was Janani, a portrait of the disintegration of a family because of the rural and urban division. In Kritadasher Hashi (Laugh of a Slave), Osman explored the darkness of contemporary politics and reality of dictatorship.

== Family ==
Osman's son Yeafesh Osman is the incumbent Science and Technology minister of Bangladesh.

== Awards ==
- Bangla Academy Literary Award (1962)
- Adamjee Literary Award (1966)
- President Award (1967)
- Ekushey Padak (1983)
- Mahbubullah Foundation Prize (1983)
- Muktadhara Literary Award (1991)
- Independence Day Award (1997)

== Literary works ==
Novels

- Boni Adam (1943)
- Janani (1958)
- Kritadaser Hasi (1962)
- Samagam (1967)
- Chaurasandhi (1968)
- Raja Upakhyan (1971)
- Jahannam Haite Biday (1971)
- Dui Sainik (1973)
- Nekre Aranya (1973)
- Patanga Pinjar (1983)
- Rajsakkhi (1985)
- Jolangi (1986)
- Puratan Khanjar (1987)

Short stories

- Pinjrapol (1358)
- Junu Apa o Anyanya Galpo (1358)
- Sabek Kahini (1953)
- Prostor Phalok (1964)
- Upolakso (1965)
- Netrapath (1968)
- Ubhosringo (1375)
- Janmo Jadi Tabo Bange (1975)
- Monib o Tahar Kukur (1986)
- Iswarer Protidandi (1990)
- Bigata Kaler Galpo (1986)

Dramas

- Amlar Mamla (1949)
- Taskar o Laskar (1953)
- Baghdader Kabi (1359)
- Daktar Abdullahr Karkhana (1973)
- Tinti Chhoto Natak (1989)
- Purna Swadhinata Churna Swadhinata (1990)

Memoires

- Kalratri Khandachitra (1986)
- Swajan Sangram (1986)

Children literature

- Oten Saheber Banglow (1944)
- Etimkhana (1955)
- Chhotoder Nanagalpo (1969)
- Digbaji (1964)
- Prize o Anyanyagalpo (1969)
- Tara Dui Jan (1944)
- Ksude Socialist (1973)
- Katha Rachanar Katha (1389)
- Panchasangi (1975)
- Itihas Bistarito (1985)
- Mosquitophone

Translation

- Panchti Natak ( from Molière 1965)
- Time Machine ( from H.G. Wells 1959)
- Panchti Kahini ( from Leo Tolstoy 1959)
- Spainer Chhotogalpo (1372)
- Prithibir Rangomonche Manush: Santaner Swikarokti ( Amrita Pritom 1985)
- Nisso 1948

Editor

- Fazlul Huquer Galpo (1983)

=== Non-fiction ===
- Samudra Nadi Samarpito (1973)
- Sangskritir Charai Utrai (1985)
- Muslim Manoser Rupantar (1986)
- Bhab Bhasha Bhabna (1974)
- Nashta tan Ashta Bhan (1986)
- Haptam Pancham (1957)
- Pitripurusher Pap (1986)
- Ebong Tin Mirza (1986)

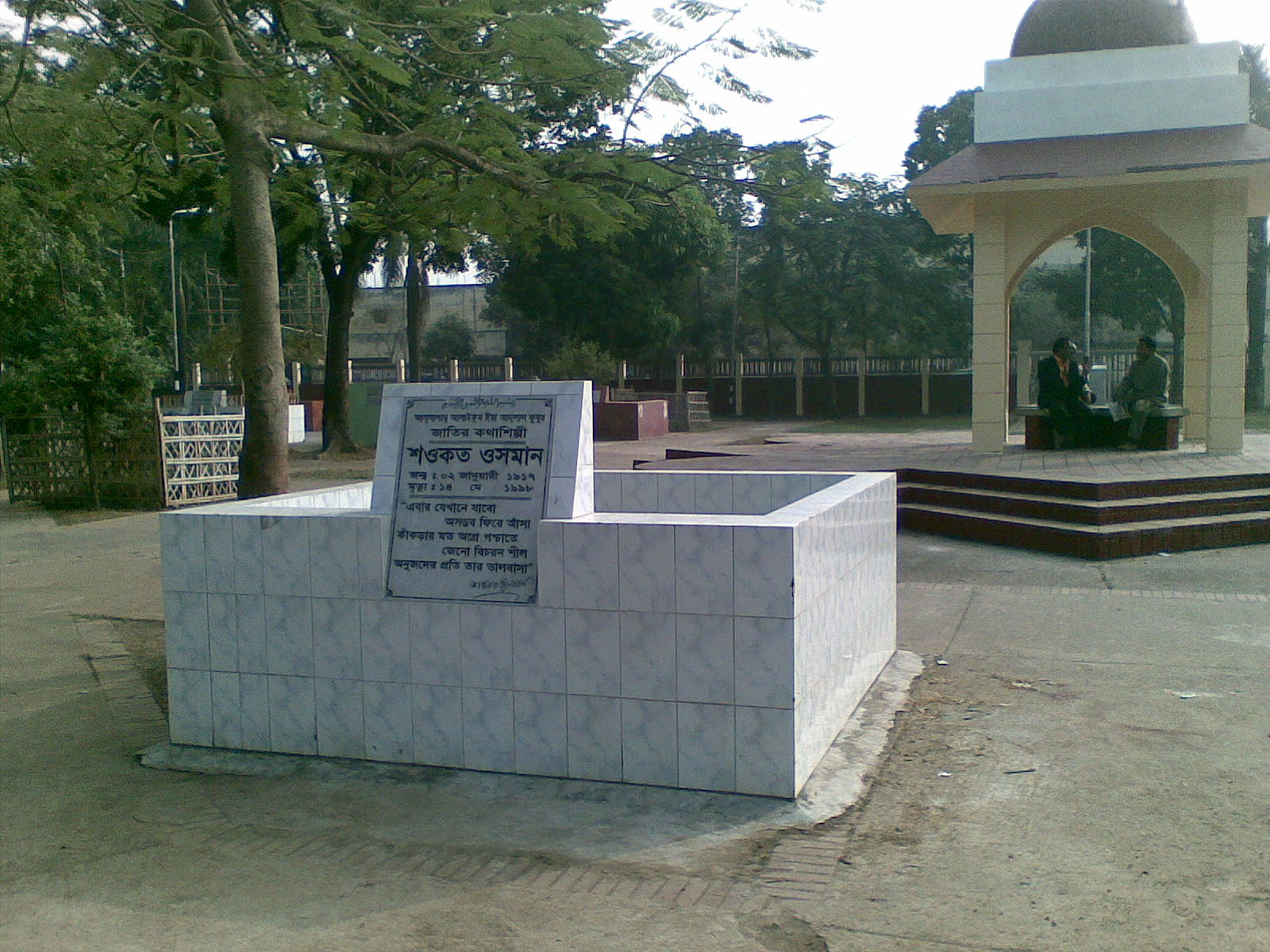
Osman's grave
