= Atpara Upazila =

Atpara Upazila আটপাড়া উপজেলা
- Upazila
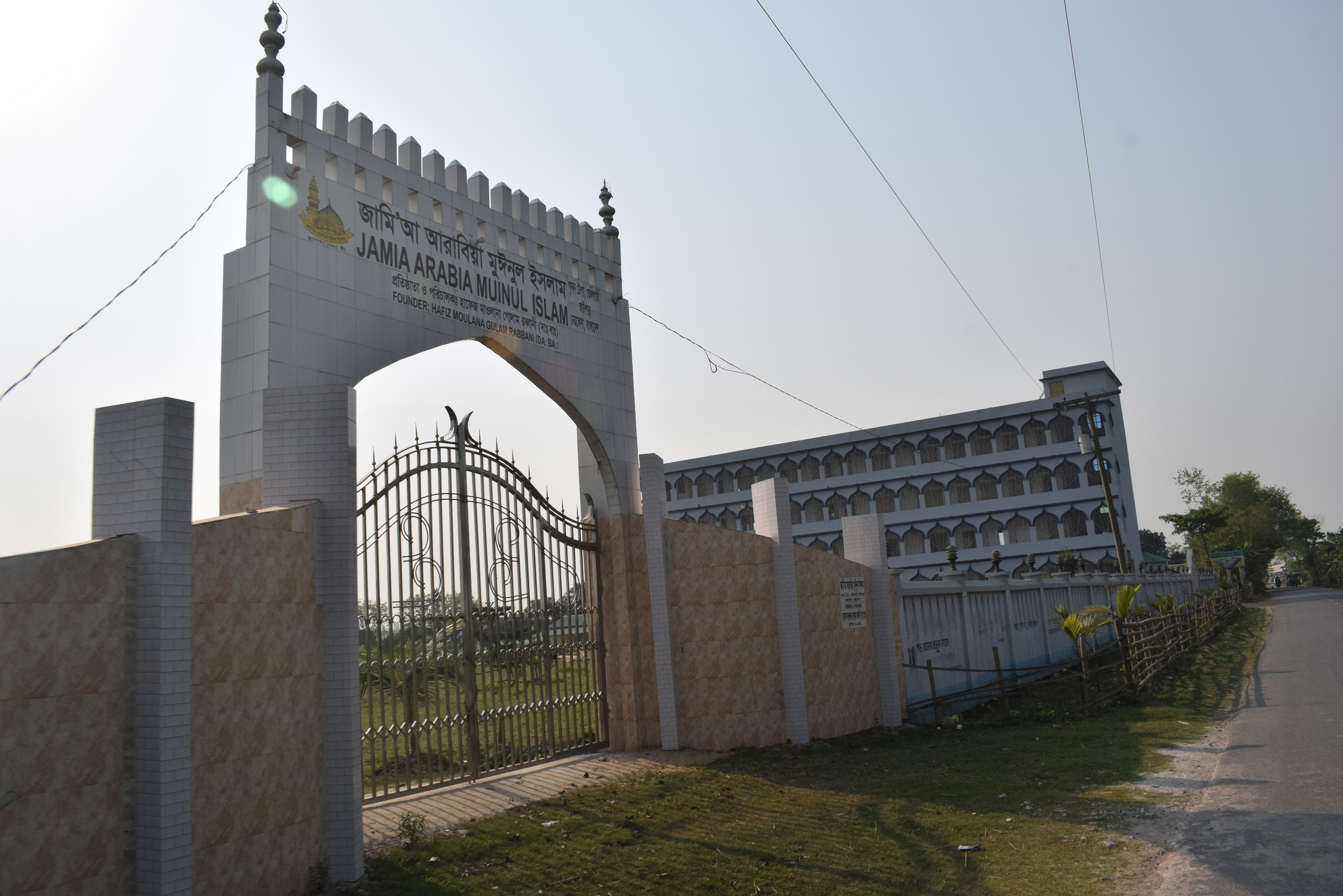
- Madrassa in Atpara upazila

- Coordinates: 24.810945°N 90.860817°E
- Country: Bangladesh
- Division: Mymensingh
- District: Netrokona
- Atpara Thana: 1926
- Atpara Upazila: 2 July 1983

Government
  - Upazila Chairman: Muhammad Khairul Islam Sripuri

Area
  - Upazila: 195 km^{2} (75 sq mi)
  - Metro: 9.04 km^{2} (3.49 sq mi)

Population (2022)
  - Upazila: 144,831
  - Density: 743/km^{2} (1,920/sq mi)
- Time zone: UTC+6 (BST)
- Postal code: 2470
- Website: atpara.netrokona.gov.bd

Atpara Upazila mauza geocode map

Atpara (Bengali: আটপাড়া) is the smallest upazila of Netrokona District, in the Division of Mymensingh, Bangladesh.

== History ==
When the Baro-Bhuiyans were in power in Bengal, Atpara was a part of the Sarkar Bazuhar. It later became part of the parganas of Sirujial and Mymensingh. The zamindar (landlord) of Mymensingh Pargana, Brajendra Kishore Roy Chowdhury of Gouripur named this area as Brajer Bazaar (Braj's market) after himself. It was later renamed to Atpara, although some locals may still refer to it today as Brajer Bazaar.

During the Mughal period, a three-domed mosque was constructed in between the villages of Shormushia and Haripur. An established Hindu zamindar family later formed in the village of Rameshwarpur. The remnants of the family palace (Roy Bari) remains a popular tourist site.

The Village of Amati in Teligati Union, Atpara is quite notable. Social reformers such as Sonafor Uddin, Muktul Husayn Khan, Shariat Khan, Anfar Uddin, Manfar Uddin and Jafar Uddin were born in Amati. During British period, Shyam Biswas, a Bengali Hindu zamindar, was noted to be very cruel and abusive towards the local inhabitants. He had certain regulations such as no one being allowed to pass his front yard wearing shoes or slippers. The social reformers organised people against this humiliation, rising against Biswas. Their revolution was soon followed in other parts of the district. Amati became a symbol of revolution against tyrant landlords.

On 21 August 1917, Atpara was made a thana. During the Bangladesh Liberation War, freedom fighters attacked the Atpara Thana on 19 August 1971. They killed a number of Razakars as well as the officer-in-charge of the thana, and they also looted arms and ammunition from the thana. On 7 October, a battle was fought leading to the death of three more Razakars. Atpara was made an upazila on 2 July 1983.

== Demographics ==
Historical population
Year	Pop.	±%
1981	106,626	—
1991	120,491	+13.0%
2001	132,499	+10.0%
2011	144,624	+9.2%
2022	144,831	+0.1%
Source: Bangladesh Bureau of Statistics

Religions in Atpara Upazila (2022)
Religion	Percent
Islam	91.93%
Hinduism	8.04%
Other or not stated	0.03%

According to the 2022 Bangladeshi census, Atpara Upazila had 34,167 households and a population of 144,855. 10.27% of the population were under 5 years of age. Atpara had a literacy rate (age 7 and over) of 64.87%: 66.05% for males and 63.76% for females, and a sex ratio of 95.31 males for 100 females. 13,931 (9.61%) lived in urban areas.

== Administration ==
Atpara Thana was formed in 1926 and it was turned into an upazila on 2 July 1983.

Atpara Upazila is divided into seven union parishads: Baniyajan, Duoj, Lunesshor, Shormushia, Shunoi, Sukhari, and Teligati. The union parishads are subdivided into 139 mauzas and 177 villages.

=== Chairmen ===
List of chairmen
Number	Name	Term
01	Zahirul Islam Khan Maju	1985 - 1990
02	Abul Husayn Master	1990 - 1991
03	Muhammad Khairul Islam Sripuri	Present

== Notable people ==
- Nuruzzaman Nayan, Coach, Bangladesh National Football Team
- Khalekdad Chowdhury, author
- Abdul Khaleq, assassinated politician

== See also ==
- Upazilas of Bangladesh
- Districts of Bangladesh
- Divisions of Bangladesh
