= Netrokona District =

Netrokona District নেত্রকোণা জেলা
- District of Bangladesh
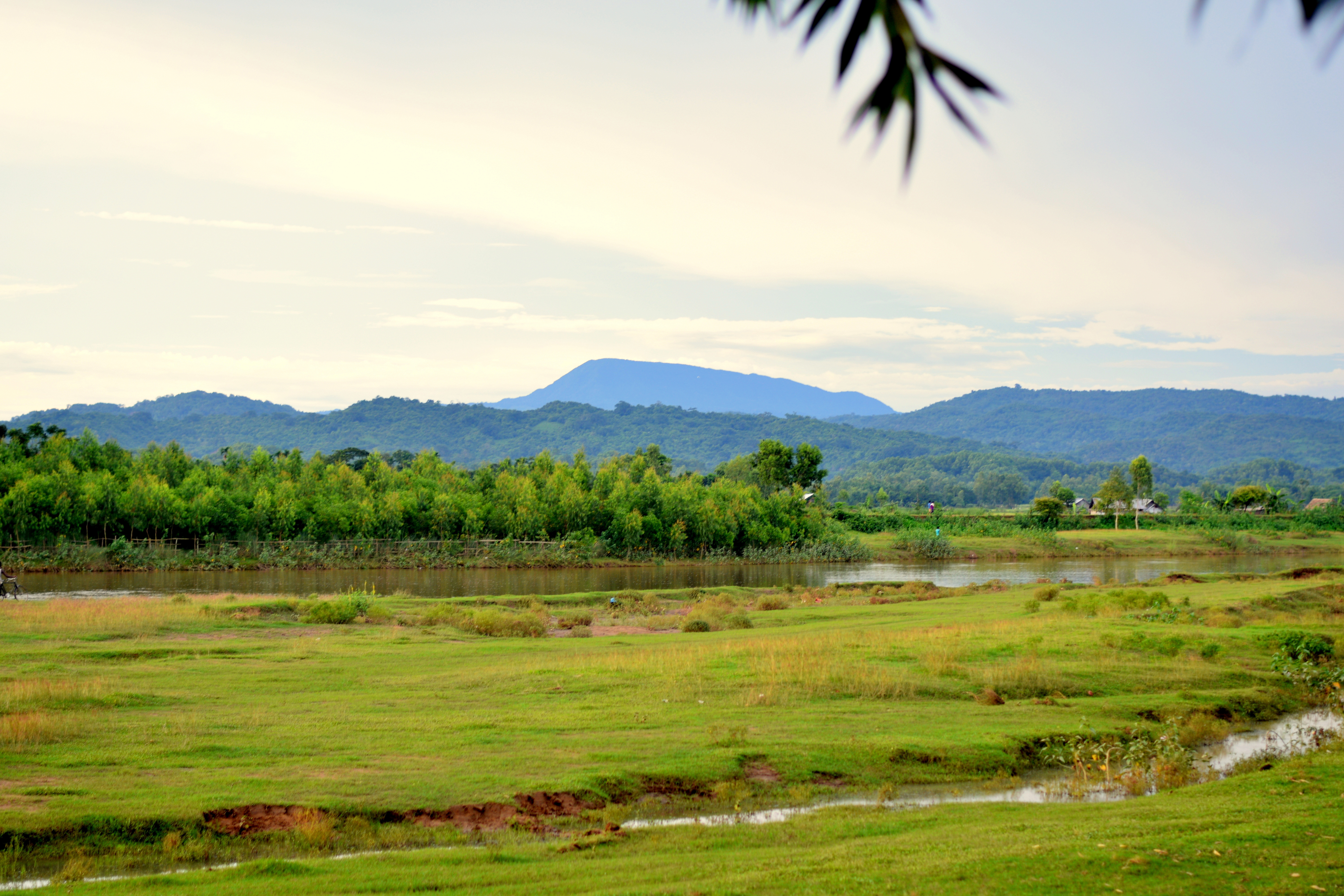
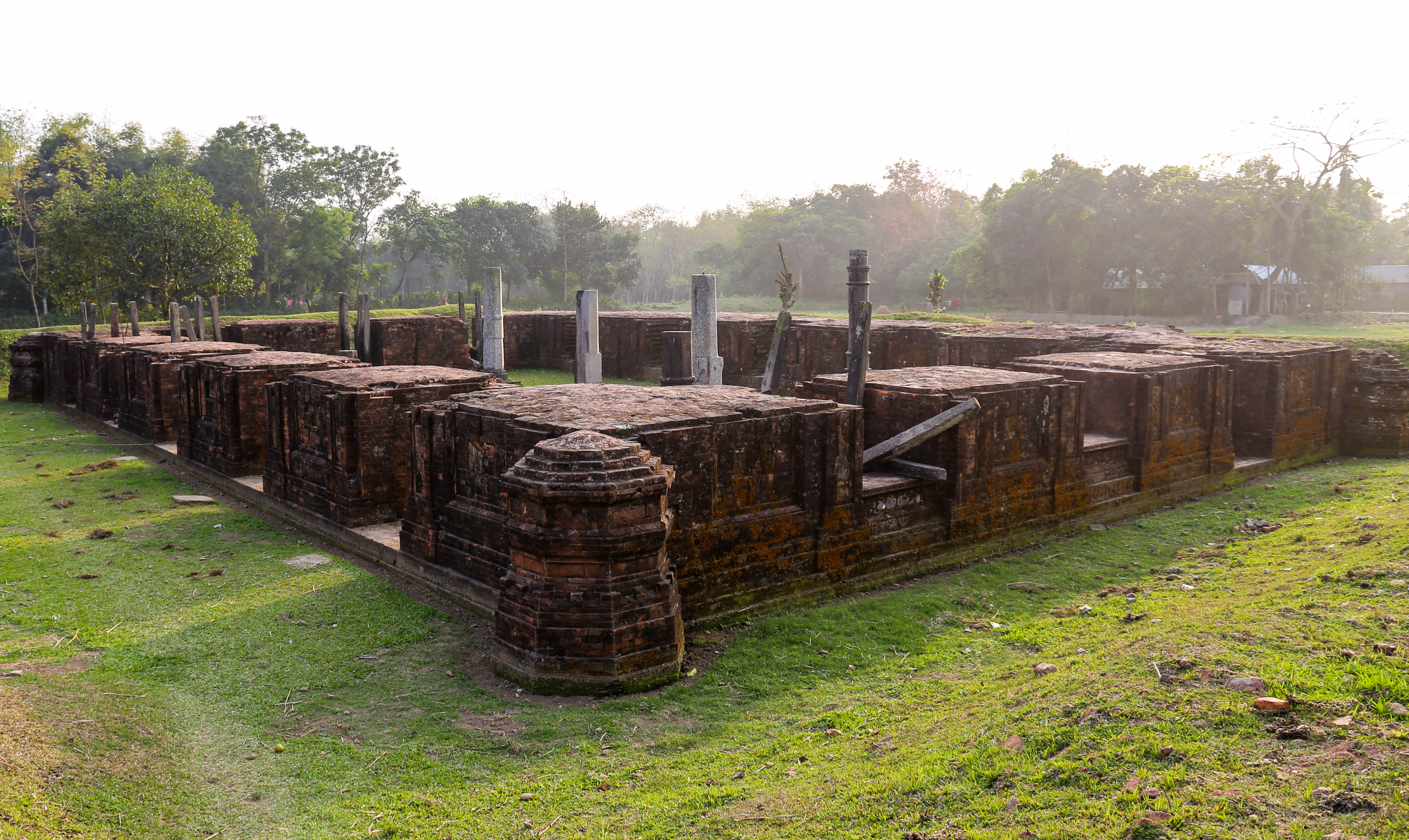
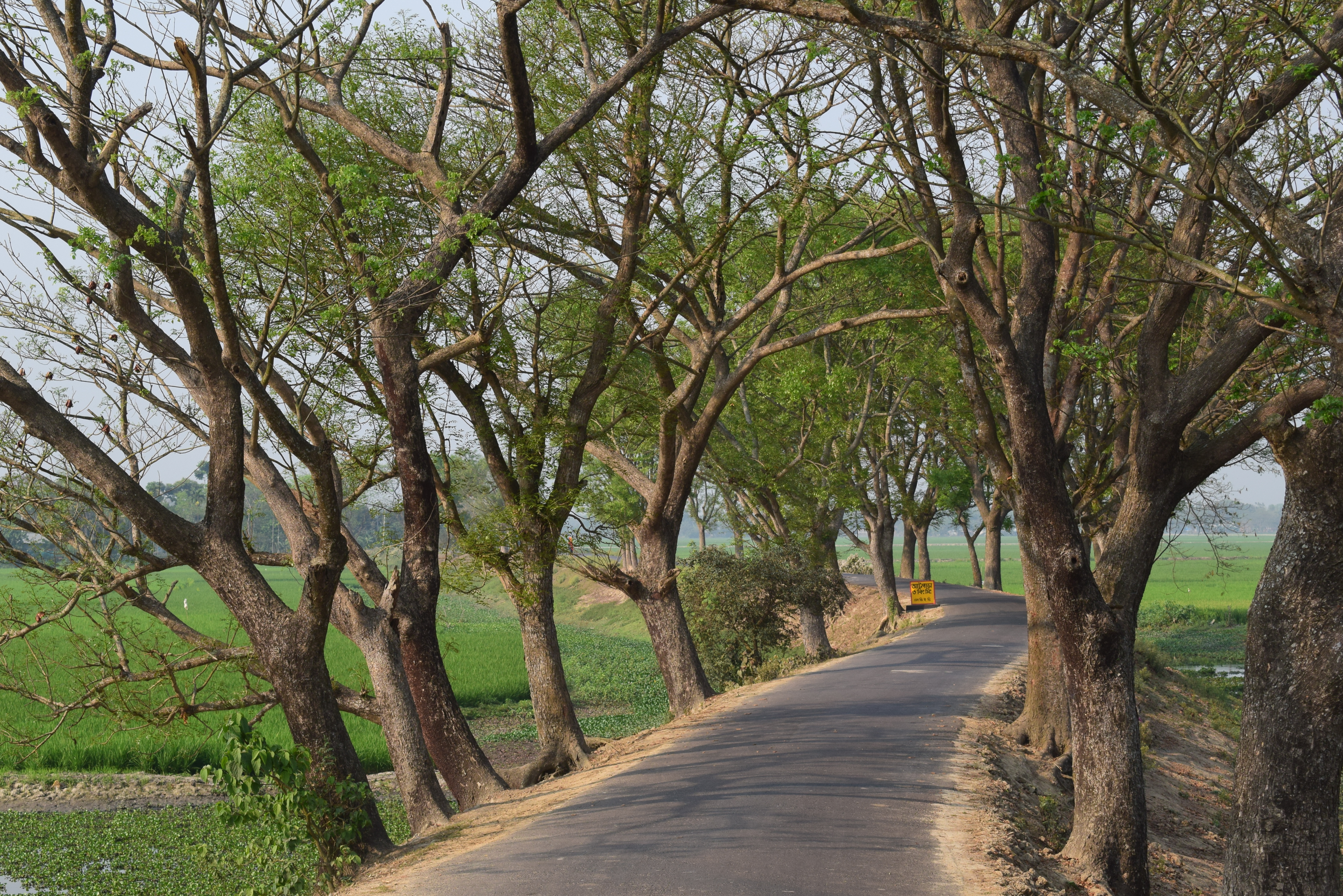
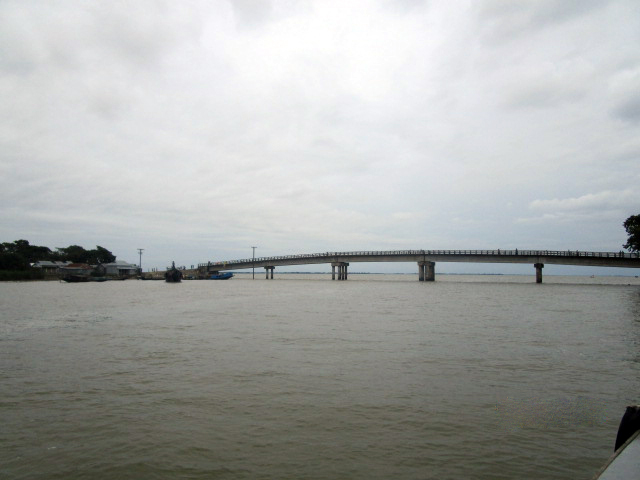
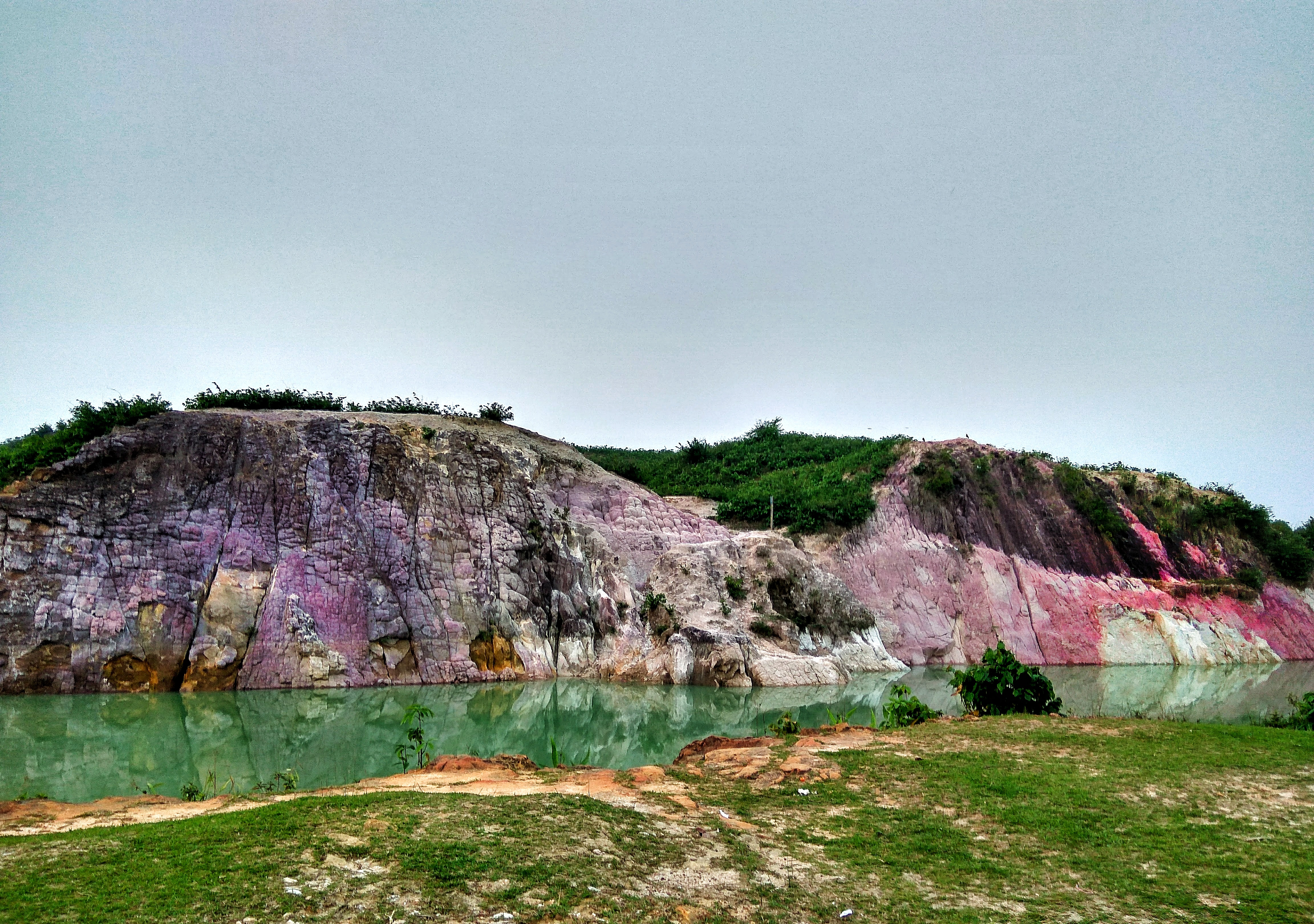
- Clockwise from top-left: Durgapur Upazila, Teligati-Atpara road, Birishiri lake, Bridge at Boali, Royal Fort at Kendua Upazila

- Location of Netrokona District in Bangladesh
- Expandable map of Netrokona District
- Coordinates: 24.88°N 90.73°E
- Country: Bangladesh
- Division: Mymensingh
- Headquarters: Netrokona

Area
  - Total: 2,794.28 km^{2} (1,078.88 sq mi)

Population (2022)
  - Total: 2,324,853
  - Density: 832.004/km^{2} (2,154.88/sq mi)
- Demonym(s): Netrokoni, Netrokonese
- Time zone: UTC+06:00 (BST)
- Postal code: 2400
- Area code: 0951
- ISO 3166 code: BD-41
- Website: www.netrokona.gov.bd

Netrokona District, also spelt Netrakona District (Bengali: নেত্রকোণা জেলা), is a district of Mymensingh Division in north-eastern Bangladesh.

== Etymology ==
The name Netrokona (IAST: Netrakona) is commonly understood to derive from two Sanskrit words: Netra, meaning eye and Koṇa, meaning corner. The name is thought to refer to the distinctive, eye-shaped outline of the town formed by the course of the Mogra River. The earliest use of the name is uncertain, though references to Netrokona appear in the medieval folk-ballad cycle Maimansingha Gitika.

== Geography ==
Netrokona is situated in the northern part of Bangladesh, along the border with the Indian state of Meghalaya. There are five main rivers in Netrokona: Kangsha, Someshawri, Dhala, Magra, and Teorkhali. It is a part of the Surma-Meghna River System. The southeastern part of the district becomes a haor during the monsoon, while the north and west is largely alluvial plains. In the north, there are some foothills of the Garo Hills.

The total area of Netrokona District is 2,744.28 km^{2} (1,059.57 sq mi) of which 9.17 km^{2} (3.54 sq mi) is under forest. It lies between 24°34’ and 25°12’ north latitudes and between 90°00’ and 91°07’ east longitudes.

Netrokona District is bounded by the Garo Hills in Meghalaya, India in the north, Sunamganj District in the east, Kishoreganj District in the south and Mymensingh District in the west. Netrokona Pouroshabha is a municipal town, established in 1887 and with 13.63 km^{2}.

== History ==
Netrokona's history is tied to the Mymensingh region. Its early history is not well-known. It likely came under the Kamrupa in the ancient period and was ruled by Koch chieftains until the arrival of Islam.

Traditions in Netrokona tell of Shah Sultan Rumi who migrated to Madanpur in Atpara Upazila in 1053 CE where he preached the religion of Islam to the local people and converted the Koch king Ganesh, well before Muslim rule in the region. He is believed to have been the earliest Sufi saint to have visited Bengal. The region was eventually was captured by the Sultans of Bengal. They built several forts to control the area, such as the Ruaylbari Fort in present-day Kendua upazila, but the region was long out of direct rule. Khaliajuri in the Haor region was long ruled by a series of Hindu chieftains into the Mughal period. The region was part of the domains of Isa Khan before the Mughal conquest, when it was made part of the sarkar of Bazuha. During the Mughal period, a three-domed mosque was constructed in modern-day Atpara.

In 1880, the British Raj approved the area as a mahakuma administrative region. It was effective on 3 January 1882 when the region was officially named as Netrakona Mahakuma before that it was named by Kaliganj.

During the Bangladesh War of Independence, pro-independence militants attacked Atpara Thana on 19 August 1971. They murdered the Officer-in-Charge of the thana as well as a number of Razakars, and they also looted arms and ammunition from the Thana. On 7 October, a battle was fought in Atpara, leading to the death of three more Razakars.

The Government of Bangladesh under Hussain Muhammad Ershad converted Netrakona Mahakuma to Netrokona District on 17 January 1984.

== Administration ==
Netrokona District upazila geocode map

Netrokona district is divided into ten upazilas.

- Atpara Upazila
- Barhatta Upazila
- Durgapur Upazila
- Khaliajuri Upazila
- Kalmakanda Upazila
- Kendua Upazila
- Madan Upazila
- Mohanganj Upazila
- Netrokona Sadar Upazila
- Purbadhala Upazila

== Demographics ==
Historical population
Year	Pop.	±% p.a.
1974	1,211,792	—
1981	1,442,142	+2.52%
1991	1,730,935	+1.84%
2001	1,988,188	+1.40%
2011	2,229,642	+1.15%
2022	2,324,853	+0.38%

According to the 2022 Census of Bangladesh, Netrokona District had 548,443 households and a population of 2,324,853 with an average 4.19 people per household. Among the population, 500,240 (21.51%) inhabitants were under 10 years of age. The population density was 847 people per km^{2}. Netrokona District had a literacy rate (age 7 and over) of 66.25%, compared to the national average of 74.80%, and a sex ratio of 1040 females per 1000 males. Approximately, 15.50% (360,293) of the population lived in urban areas. The ethnic population was 21,605 (0.93%), mainly Garo and Hajong.

Religions in Netrokona District (2022)
Religion	Percent
Islam	90.46%
Hinduism	8.72%
Christianity	0.76%
Other or not stated	0.06%

Religion in present-day Netrokona District
Religion	1941 (Note: Netrokona subdivision of erstwhile Mymensingh district, which roughly corresponds to the present district.)		1981		1991		2001		2011		2022	
Religion	Pop.	%	Pop.	%	Pop.	%	Pop.	%	Pop.	%	Pop.	%
Islam	578,501	70.71%	1,245,140	86.34%	1,517,751	87.68%	1,762,534	88.65%	2,001,732	89.78%	2,103,091	90.46%
Hinduism	219,633	26.85%	174,624	12.11%	189,082	10.92%	204,329	10.28%	207,430	9.30%	202,648	8.72%
Tribal religion (Note: A category in the 1941 census for all tribals, irrespective of actual religion practiced.)	18,301	2.24%	—N/a	—N/a	—N/a	—N/a	—N/a	—N/a	—N/a	—N/a	—N/a	—N/a
Christianity	1,578	0.19%	18,871	1.31%	19,994	1.16%	18,905	0.95%	18,200	0.82%	17,699	0.76%
Others (Note: Including Jainism, Buddhism, Zoroastrianism, Judaism, Ad-Dharmis, or not stated)	73	0.01%	3,507	0.24%	4,108	0.24%	2,420	0.12%	2,280	0.11%	1,415	0.06%
Total Population	818,086	100%	1,442,142	100%	1,730,935	100%	1,988,188	100%	2,229,642	100%	2,324,853	100%

The district of Netrakona consists of 3146 mosques, 958 temples, 183 churches and eight Buddhist temples. Hindus are most concentrated in the haor region bordering Sylhet. The population of minorities has declined from 2011-2021.

Bengalis are the dominant group present. The ethnic minority population is 21,605 (0.93%), of which 16,064 are Garo, 4,327 Hajong and 554 Hudi.

== Economy ==
The economy of Netrakona is largely agrarian. Susang Durgapur, an Upazila of Netrakona, is one of the major sources of the country's China-Clay used for ceramic products. Its vast water bodies (Haor) provide a wide variety of fish. Bara Bazar and Choto Bazar is commerce centre of Netrakona.

== See also ==
- Districts of Bangladesh
- Upazila
- Divisions of Bangladesh
- Administrative geography of Bangladesh
