= Mohanganj Paurashava =

Mohanganj Paurashava মোহনগঞ্জ পৌরসভা

Type
- Type: Municipality

History
- Founded: 1865; 161 years ago

Leadership
- Chairman: Janab Latifur Rahman Ratan
- Secretary: Janab Saibal Chandra Saha
- Assistant Planner: Janab Mohd. Saiful Amin

Mohanganj Paurashava (Bengali: মোহনগঞ্জ পৌরসভা) is a Municipality in Mohanganj Upazila, Netrakona District, Dhaka Division, Bangladesh.

== Background ==
Mohanganj Paurashava was established in 1975 with the commercial market of Barkashia Birampur Union, Hat Mohanganj and 15 mouzas. Janab Abdul Momin, Food Minister during the Premiership of Sheikh Mujibur Rahman played a big role in setting up the paurashava.

== Geography ==
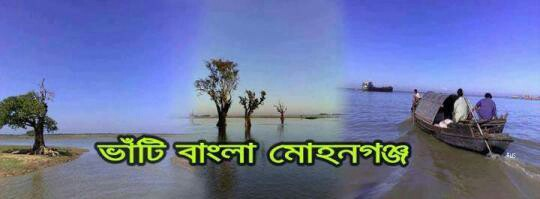

It is bounded on the north by the Kangsha River, on the south and the east by parts of the Barkashia Birampur Union and on the west by Barhatta Upazila. It covers an area of 6.94 km^{2}. As Mohanganj has the last railway station in the Bhati Bhati (region) Mohanganj plays an important role in the trade and commerce of the region.

== Elections ==
In 1977, the first elected body took charge of the paurasabha. There after seven elections have taken place.

== Education ==
Noted educational institutions are: Mohanganj Degree College (1969), Mohanganj Mohila College (1998), Mohanganj Government Pilot High School (1931), Mohanganj Public High School (1981). Mohanganj Pauroshava has set up five educational institutions - Mohanganj Degree College, Mohanganj Pilot Government High School, Mohanganj Pilot Girles High School, Mohanganj Public High School and Mohanganj Adarsha High School.

== Demographics ==
Mohanagnj Paurashava had 7,522 house holds. It had a total population of 32,384 of which16,076 were males and 16,308 were females. Muslims numbered 25,666 and Hindus 6,716.

== Wards ==
Mohanganj Pourosabha is divided into nine wards as noted below

Ward No.	Region	Households	Population (2022)
1	Naohai, Nohai, Tengapara (part)*, Tengarpara (part)	1014	4465
2	Tengapara (part)*, Tengarpara (part)	727	2960
3	Hat Mohanganj, Hat Mohanganj, Tengarpara (part)*, Tengapara (part)	293	1368
4	Baroichira, Baroichira, Deothan*, Deothan, Mirarganti, Mirarganti	3093	9208
5	Mairora*, Mairora	742	3144
6	Banda Pareha*, Banda Pahreha, Kaziati*, Kazati, Satur&, Satur	646	2884
7	Bartargati*, Bartargati, Prasannapur, Daulatpur (part)*, Daulatpur (part), Pukuria*, Pukuria, Rautpara*, Rautpara	1567	6527
8	Daulatpur (part)*, Daulatpur	981	4429
9	Daulatpur (part)*, Daulatpur	856	3514

- Mouzas

== Mohanganj picture gallery ==
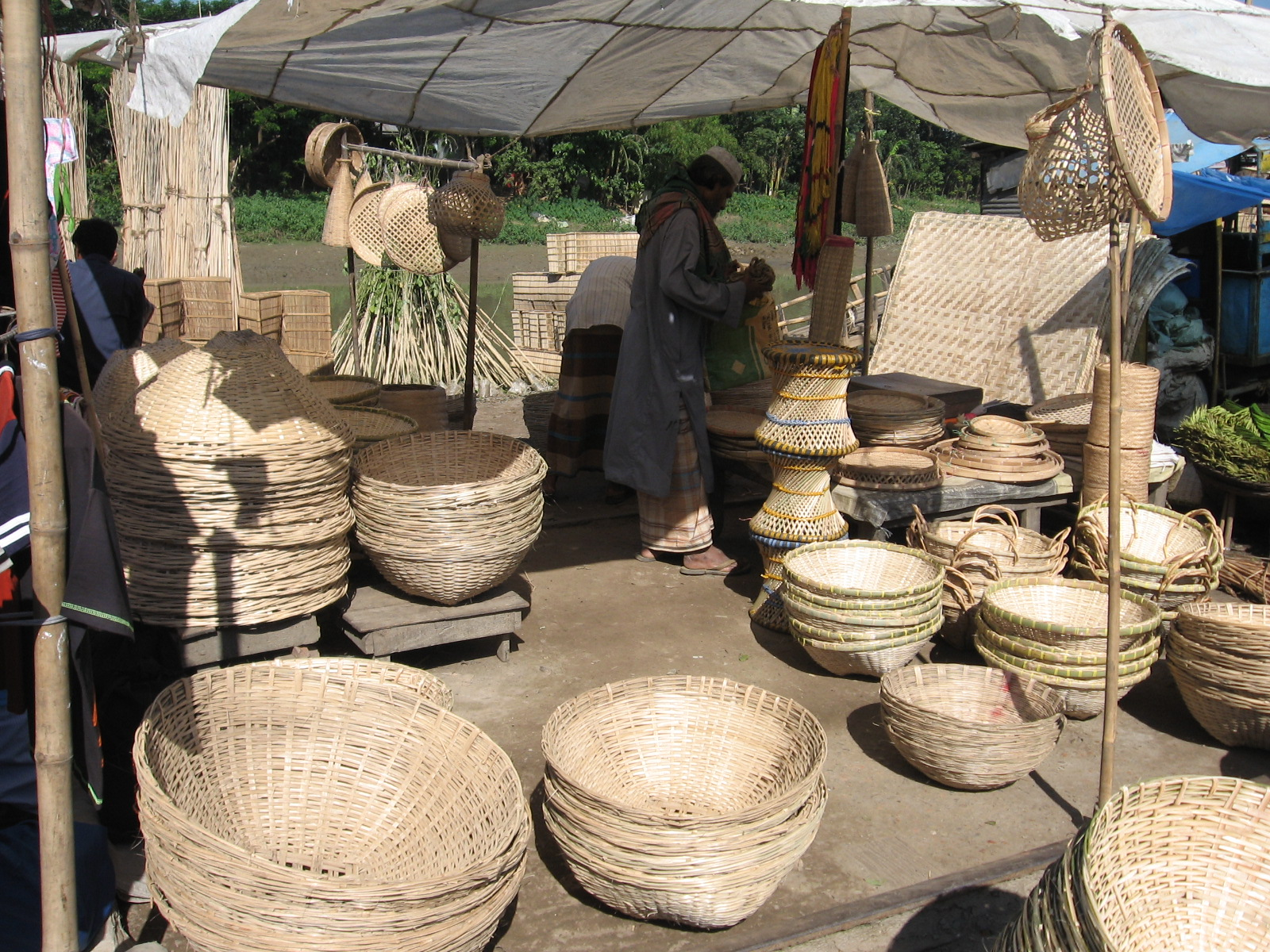
Bamboo products of Mohanganj

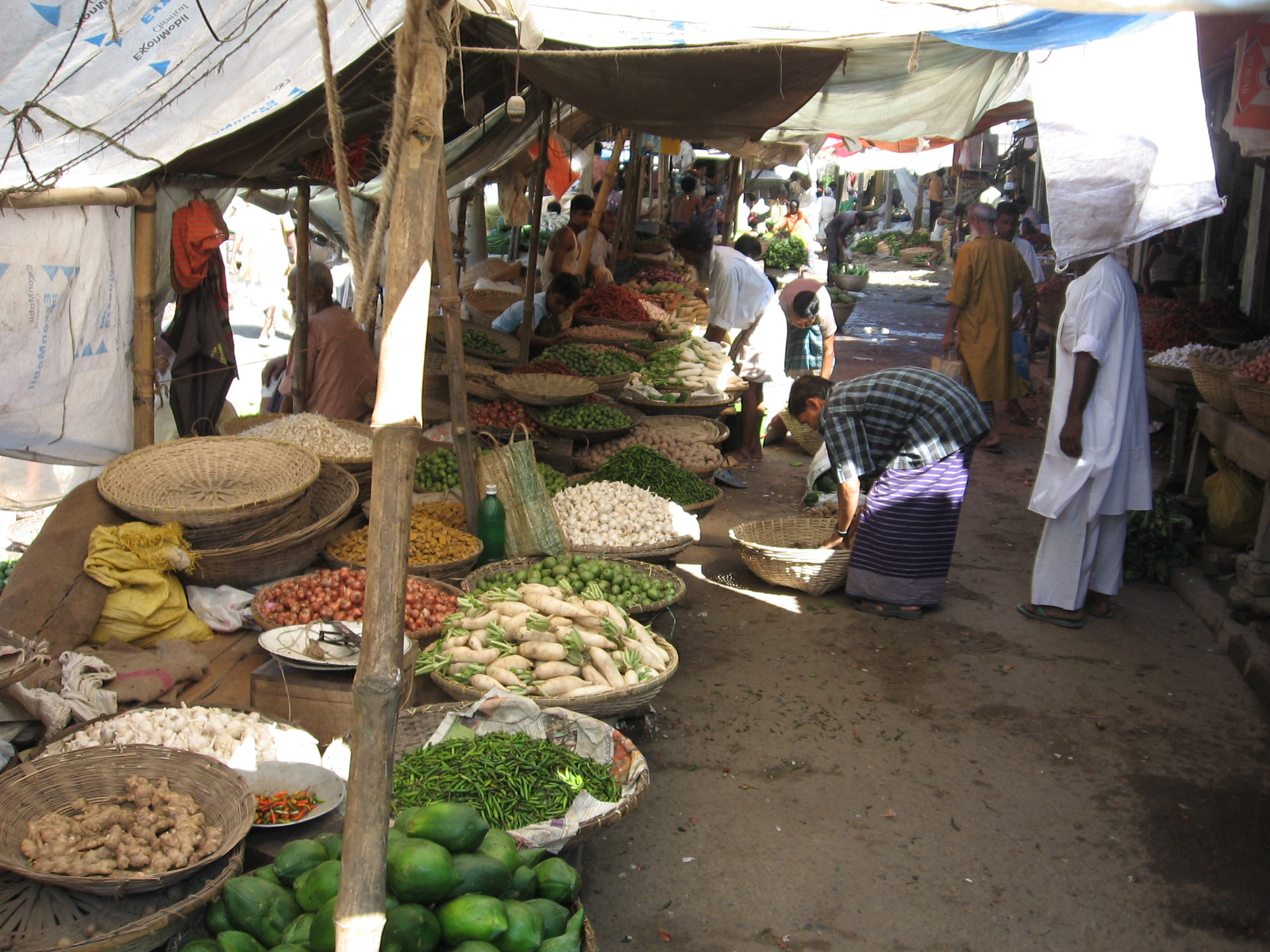
Vegetable market

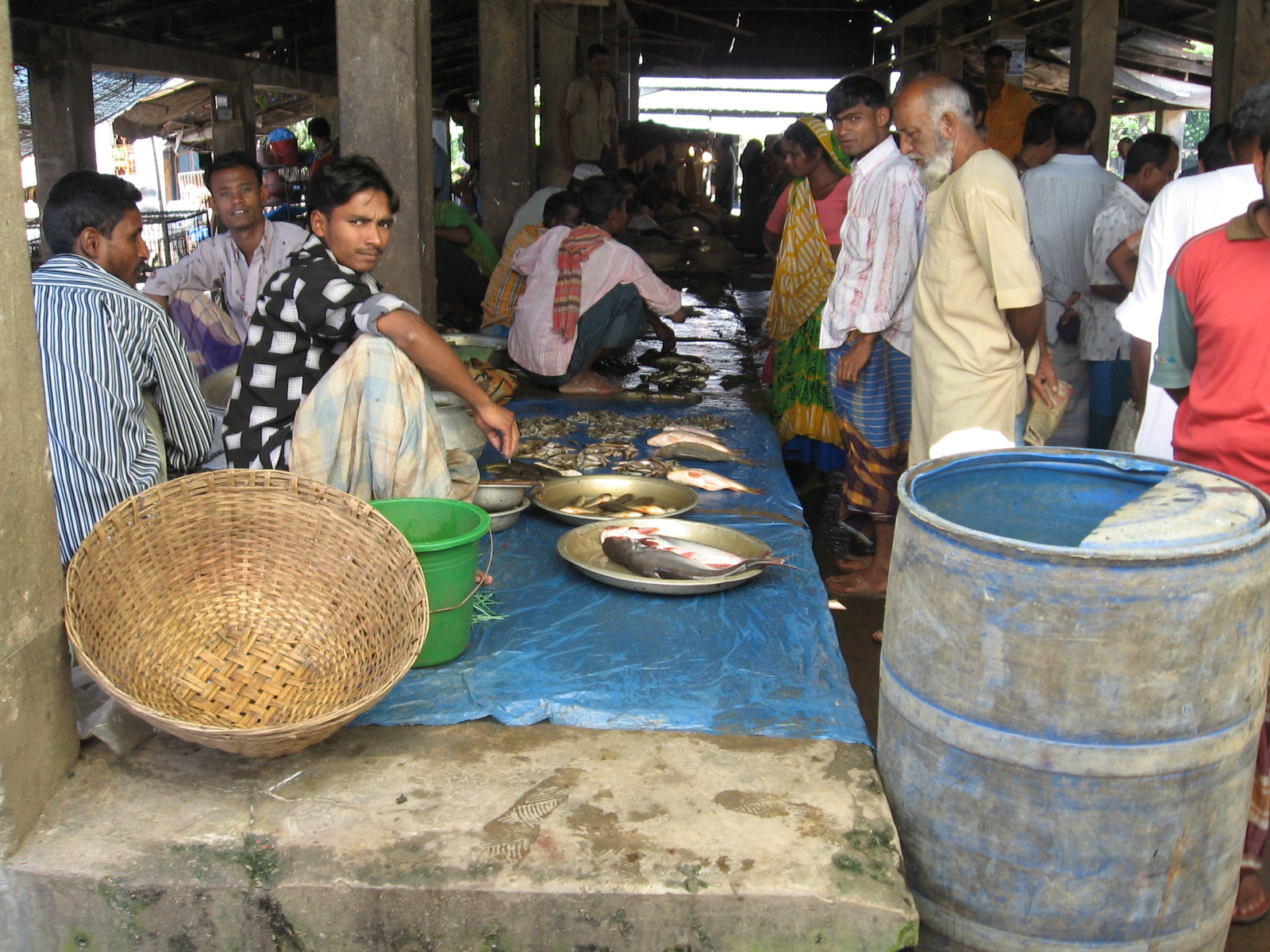
Fish market

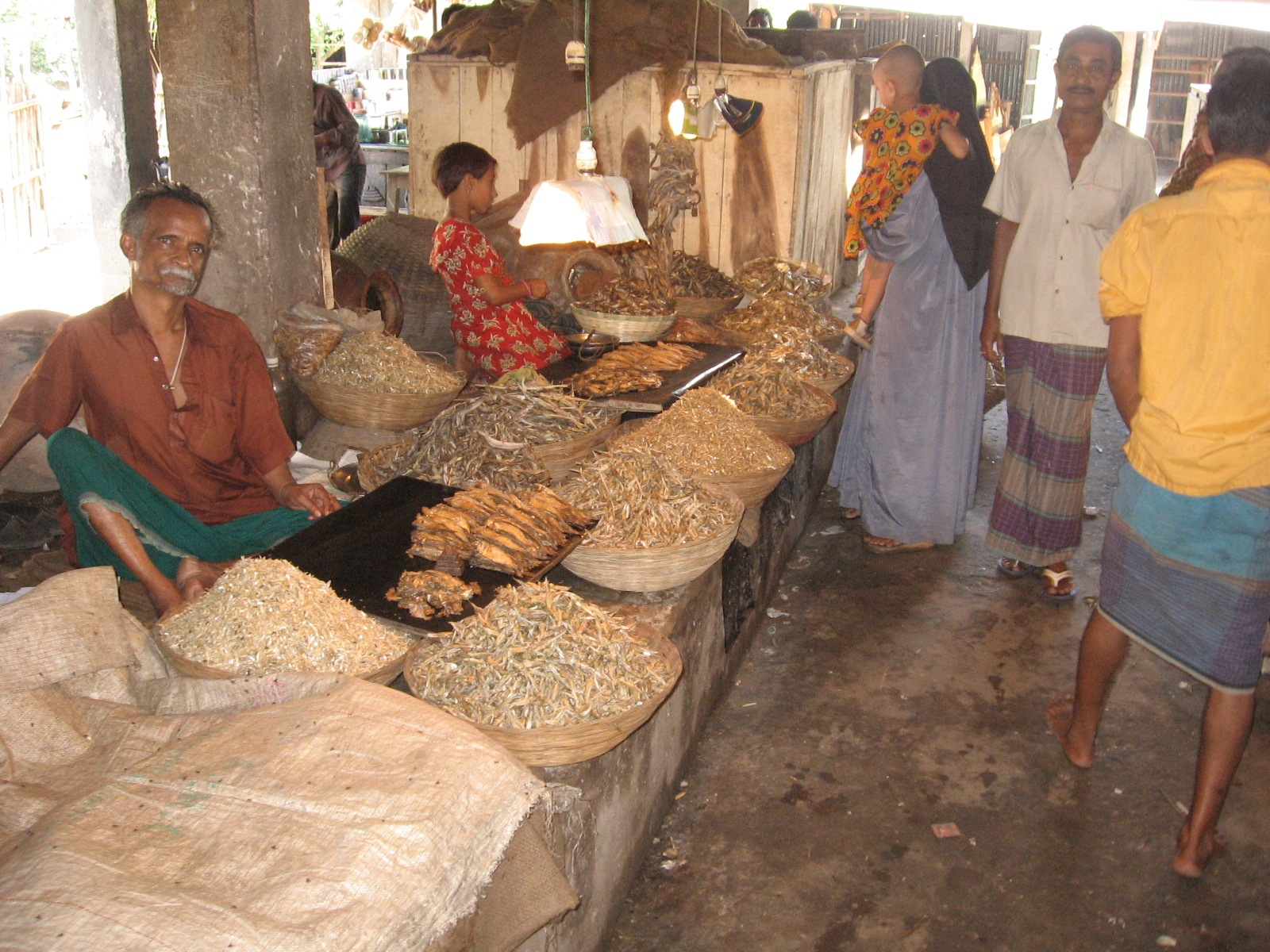
Dry fish market

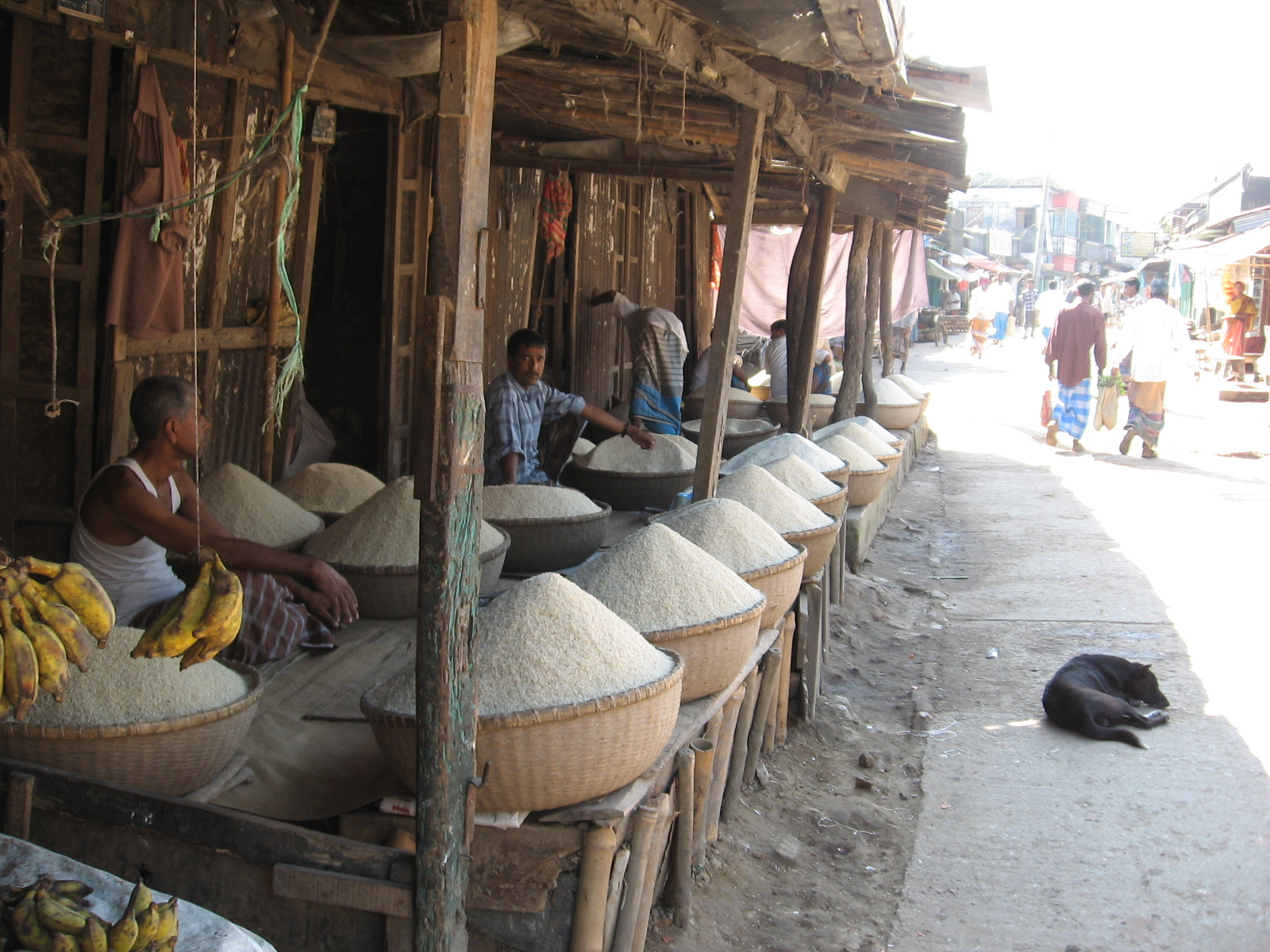
Rice market
