= Baham =

Baham may refer to:

== Places ==
- Baham, Cameroon, a town in Cameroon
- Baham, Netrakona, a neighbourhood of Mohanganj Paurashava, Bangladesh

== People ==
- Curt Baham (born 1963), an American football player
- Chelsie Baham (born 1996), an American reality television personality

== Languages ==
- Baham language, a Papuan language spoken on the Bomberai Peninsula

== Other uses ==
- Baham (Biham), a name of the star Theta Pegasi
- USS Baham (AG-71), a ship named for the star
