= Barkashia Birampur Union =

Barkashia Birampur Union বড়কাশিয়া বিরামপুর ইউনিয়ন
- Location in Bangladesh
- Coordinates: 24.871667°N 90.971389°E
- Country: Bangladesh
- Division: Mymensingh Division
- District: Netrokona District
- Upazila: Mohanganj Upazila

Population (2022)
  - Total: 19,894
- Time zone: UTC+6 (BST)

Barkashia Birampur Union (Bengali: বড়কাশিয়া বিরামপুর ইউনিয়ন) is a union parishad under Mohanganj Upazila of Netrokona District in northern Bangladesh

== History ==
During the rule of the Hindu rulers, the area, known in later days as the eastern part of Mymensingh district, was covered with thick forests and was ruled by Koch, Hajong and Garo people, Towards the end of the 13th century, Baisya Garo ruled over the area. In the Muslim era, around the 14th century, the area west of the Meghna River was called the Bhati region. After the ascent of the independent late medieval Sultan of the Bengal Sultanate, Alauddin Husain Shah in 1498, the Mymensingh area came under Muslim rule.

== Personality ==
Sailajaranjan Majumdar (19 July 1900 – 24 May 1992) a distinguished exponent and teacher of Rabindra Sangeet, the son of Ramanikishore and Saralasundari Majumdar, was born at Baham.

== Geography ==
Union Parishads in Mohanganj Upazila
U:union parishads, M:mahalla or neighbourhood
Owing to space constraints in the small map, the actual locations in a larger map may vary slightly

In the Bengal District Gazetteers – Mymensingh, F.A.Sachse, ICS, described this area in 1917 as, “The general characteristic of the Mymensingh villages which lie near the hills is their extreme flatness, and there are unusually long unbroken stretches of paddy land. There are few trees, and the khals are very narrow, but extremely deep down in their beds and difficult to cross... Palm trees grow in every basti, the most useful being the cocoanut (Narikel ; Cocos nucifera).

Barkashia Birampur Union has a total area of 5,338 acres (2,160 ha).

The Kangsha River flows in this region.

== Demographics ==
According to the 2022 Bangladeshi census, Barkashia Birampur Union had 4,489 households and had a total population of 19,894 of which males numbered 9,844 and females numbered 10,048. Muslims numbered 17,434, Hindus 2,580 .

Barkashia Birampur Union had a literacy rate of 42.0%.
