= Baham, Netrakona =

Baham বাহাম
- Location in Bangladesh
- Coordinates: 24.880544°N 90.98635°E
- Country: Bangladesh
- Division: Mymensingh Division
- District: Netrokona District
- Upazila: Mohanganj Upazila
- Municipality: Mohanganj Pourosabha
- Village: Deothan

Population (2022)
  - Total: 19,894
- Time zone: UTC+6 (BST)

Baham (Bengali: বাহাম) is a neighbourhood in Mohanganj Paurashava of Mohanganj Upazila in Netrokona District, Mymensingh Division, Bangladesh.

== History ==
The Gouripur zamindar family was established around 1700. Brajendra Kishore Roy Chowdhury, the fifth zamindar, was a musician and prominent patron of Indian classical music. His activities were spread up to Sunamganj in present day Sylhet Division. He had a large kachharibari (courthouse) at Netrakona. Krishna Chandra Dutta Mazumdar and his son Gobinda Chandra Dutta Mazumdar of Deothan were nayebs (administrative assistants) in the zamindari, who looked after rent collection.

== Personality ==
Sailajaranjan Majumdar (19 July 1900 – 24 May 1992) a distinguished exponent and teacher of Rabindra Sangeet, the son of Ramanikishore and Saralasundari Majumdar, was born at Baham.

=== Sailajaranjan Cultural Centre ===
Saialjaranjan Cultural Centre is a world-class facility. It has a three-storey academy building, a 310-seat multi-purpose conference hall, two-storey library, 4 classrooms, 2 office rooms and a dining room. A museum with the items used by Shoilajaranjan Mazumder has also been established at the center. Built at a cost of Taka 39 crores, the foundation stone was laid by the then Prime Minister Sheikh Hasina in 2018. The centre is under the Ministry of Cultural Affairs, Bangladesh. Sajjadul Hassan, Secretary at Prime Minister's Office took the initiative to establish the Shoilajaranjan Mazumder Cultural Center.

== Geography ==
Union Parishads in Mohanganj Upazila
U:union parishads, M:mahalla or neighbourhood
Owing to space constraints in the small map, the actual locations in a larger map may vary slightly

Baham-Mohanganj lies in the Bhati (region) which covers the low-lying areas of the greater districts of Dhaka, Mymensingh, Tippera (Comilla) and Sylhet, as defined from the days of the Mughal Emperors Akbar and Jahangir.

The Kangsha River flows in this region.

== Demographics ==
Baham has a total population of 19,894 of which 9,844 were males and 10,048 were females. Muslims numbered 4,186 and Hindus numbered 250.

== Transport ==
Baham is served by the Mohanganj railway station.
