= Deothan =

Deothan দেওথান
- Location in Bangladesh
- Coordinates: 24.86242°N 90.98635°E
- Country: Bangladesh
- Division: Mymensingh Division
- District: Netrokona District
- Upazila: Mohanganj Upazila
- Municipality: Mohanganj Pourosabha
- Village: Deothan

Population
  - Total: 2,636
- Time zone: UTC+6 (BST)

Deothan is a neighbourhood in Ward No. 4 of Mohanganj Municipality of Mohanganj Upazila in Netrokona District, Mymensingh Division, Bangladesh.

== History ==
During the rule of the Hindu rulers, the area known in later days as the eastern part of Mymensingh district, was covered with thick forests and was ruled by Koch, Hajong and Garo people, Towards the end of the 13th century, Baisya Garo ruled over the area. In the Muslim era, around the 14th century, the area west of the Meghna River was called the Bhati region. After the ascent of the independent late medieval Sultan of the Bengal Sultanate, Alauddin Husain Shah in 1498, the Mymensingh area came under Muslim rule.

The Gouripur zamindar family was established around 1700. Brajendra Kishore Roy Chowdhury, the fifth zamindar, was a musician and prominent patron of Indian classical music. His activities were spread up to Sunamganj in present day Sylhet Division. He had a large kachharibari (courthouse) at Netrakona. Krishna Chandra Dutta Mazumdar and his son Gobinda Chandra Dutta Mazumdar of Deothan were nayebs (administrative assistants) in the zamindari, who looked after rent collection.

== Personality ==
Sailajaranjan Majumdar (19 July 1900 – 24 May 1992) a distinguished exponent and teacher of Rabindra Sangeet, the son of Ramanikishore and Saralasundari Majumdar, was born at Baham, nearby.

== Geography ==
Union Parishads in Mohanganj Upazila
U:union parishads, M:mahalla or neighbourhood
Owing to space constraints in the small map, the actual locations in a larger map may vary slightly

=== Bhati (region) ===
Deothan-Mohanganj lies in the Bhati (region) which covers the low-lying areas of the greater districts of Dhaka, Mymensingh, Tippera (Comilla) and Sylhet, as defined from the days of the Mughal Emperors Akbar and Jahangir.

=== Kangsha River ===
The Kangsha River flows in this region.

== Demographics ==
According to the 2022 Bangladeshi census, Deothan had a total population of 2,636, of which males numbered 1,310 and females numbered 1,326. Muslims numbered 1, 774 and Hindus 862.

== Pictures ==
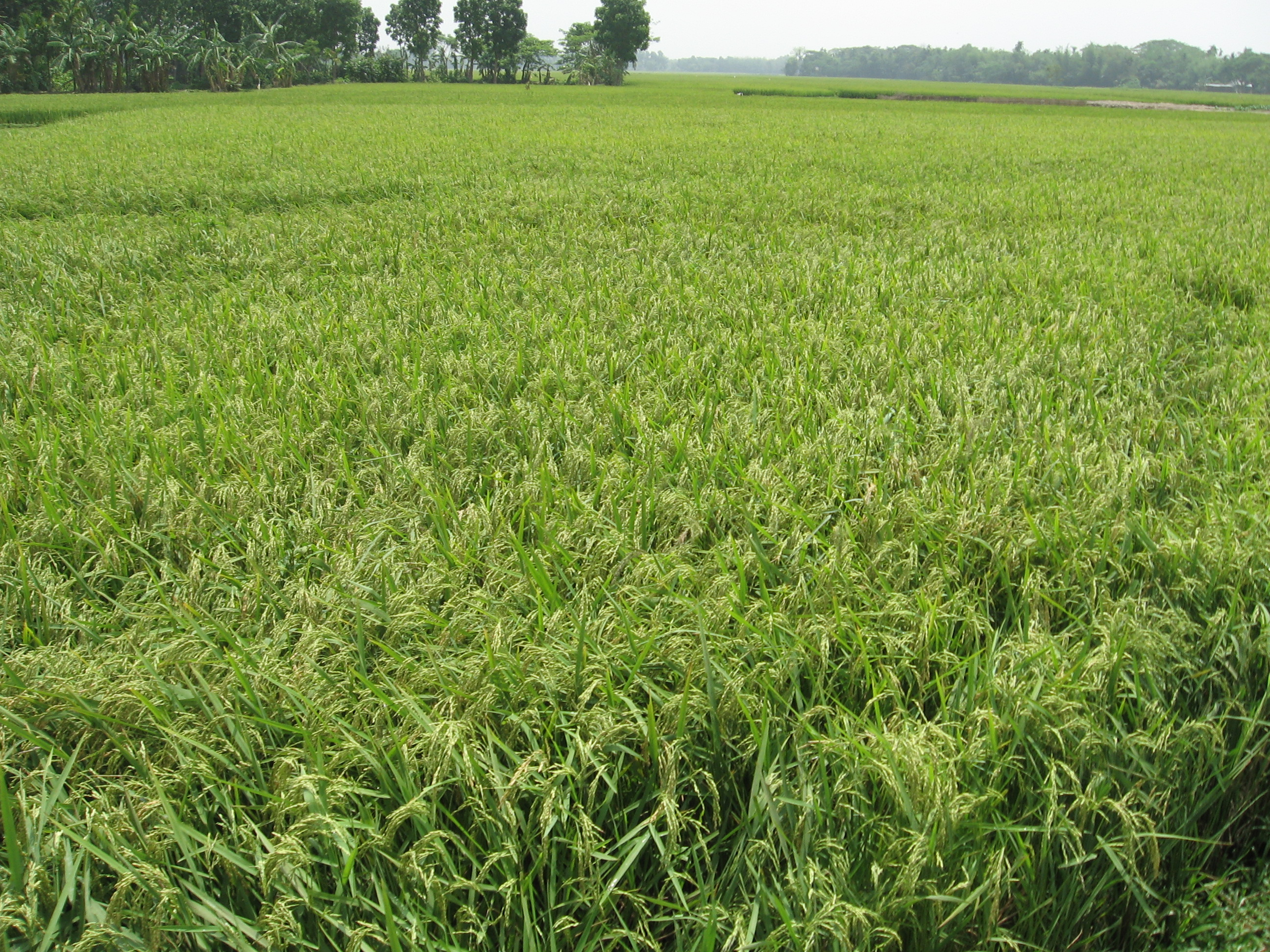
Paddy field in Deothan

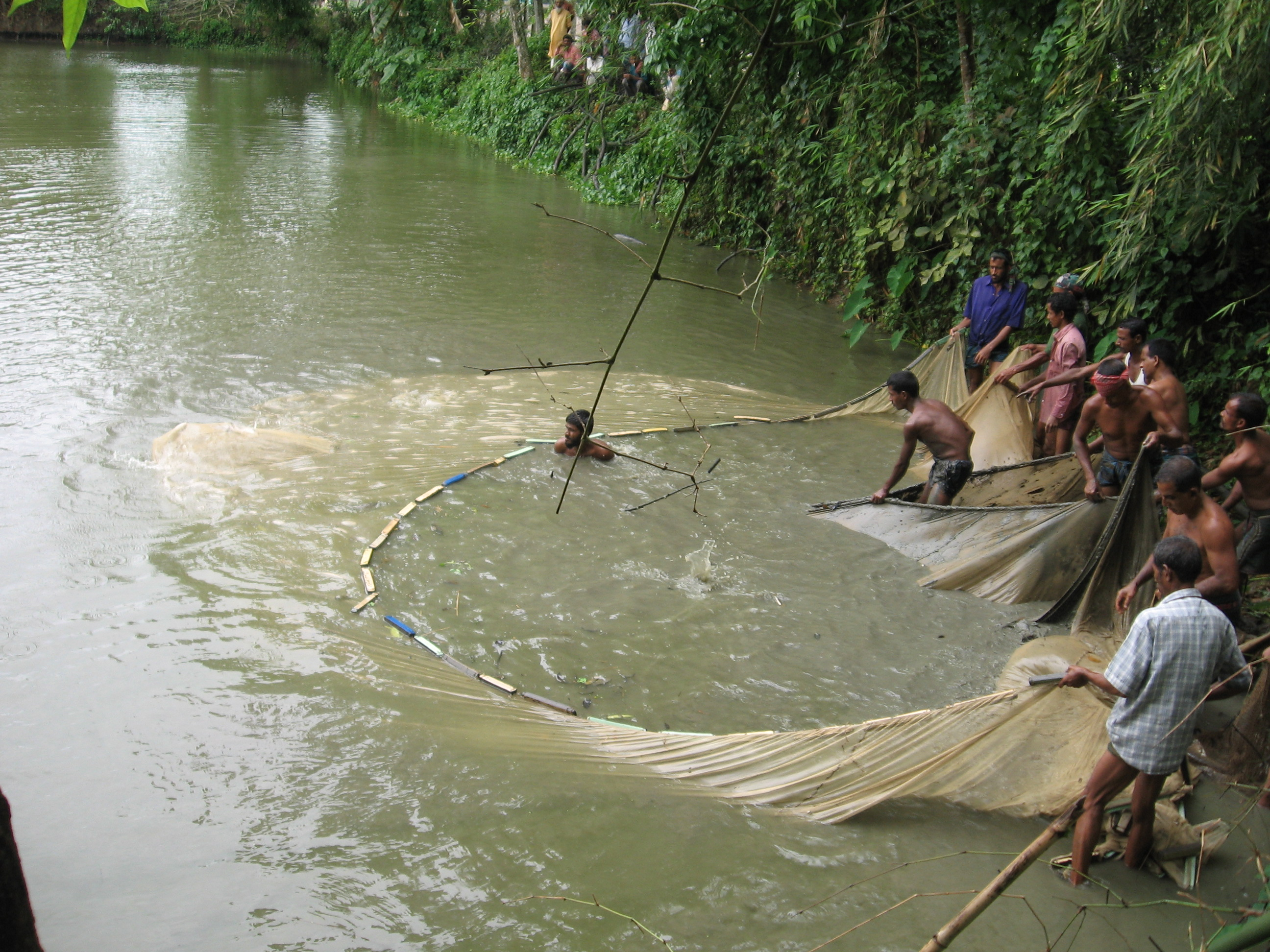
Fishing in a pond at Deothan

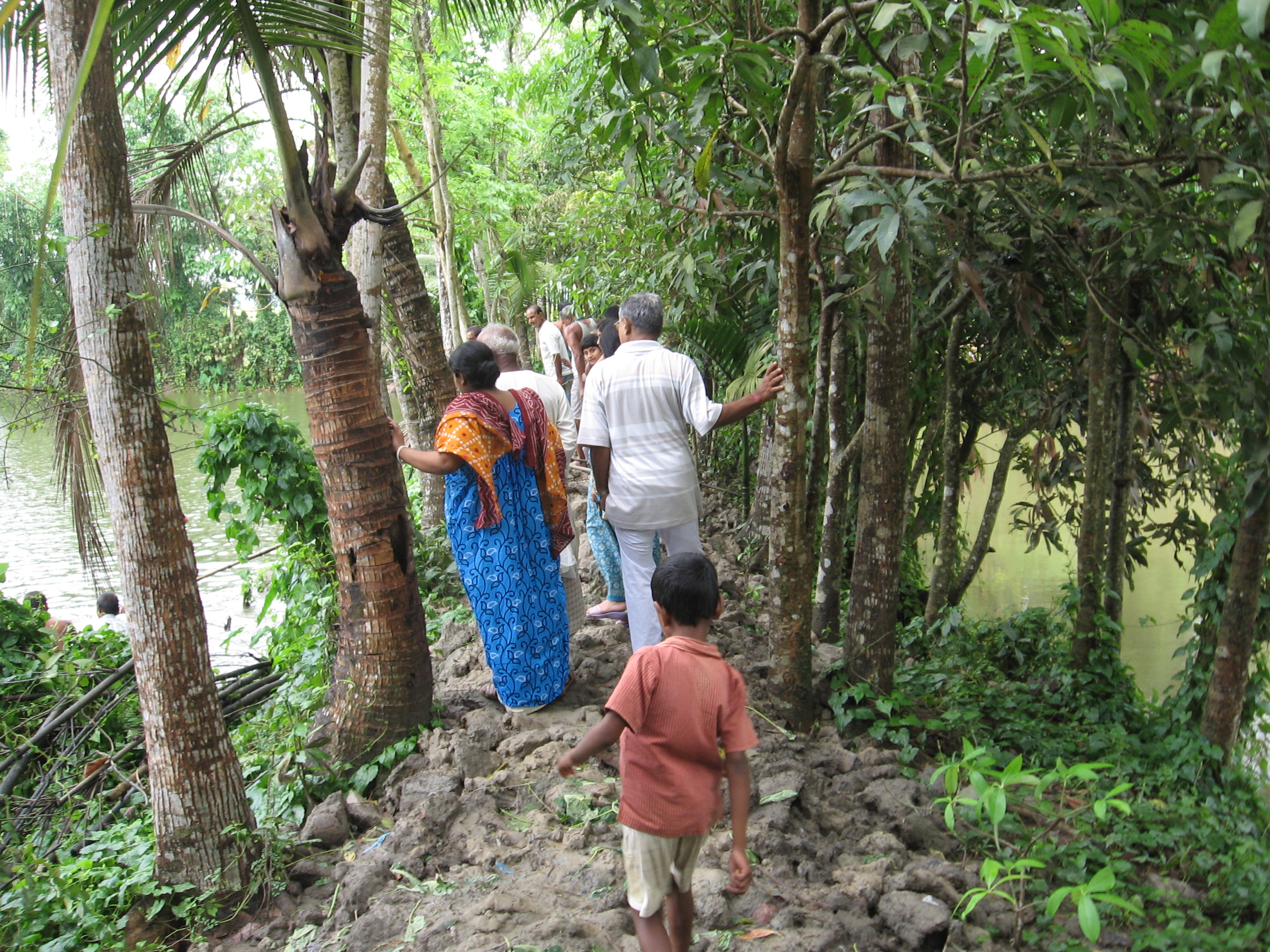
A viilage scene in Deothan

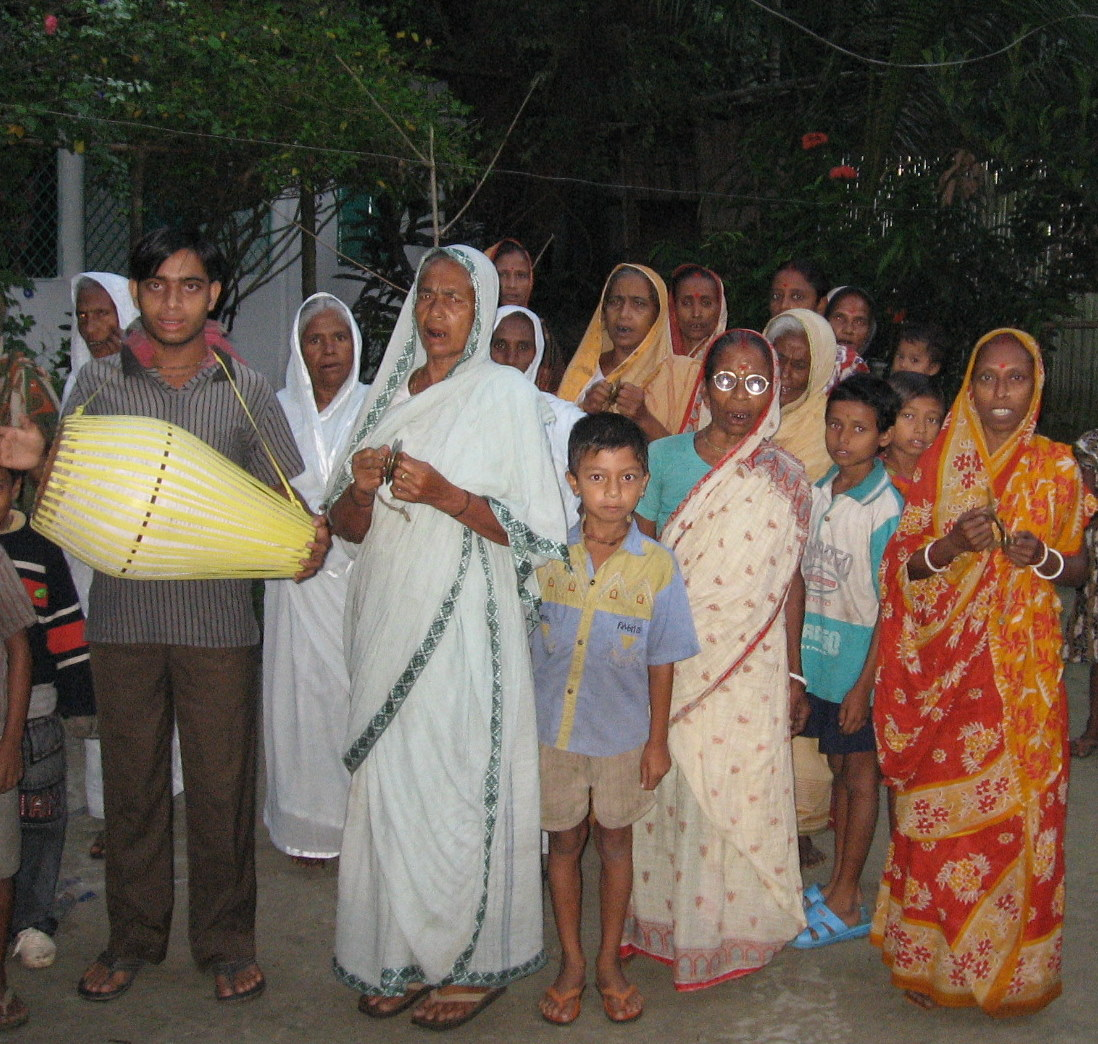
A kirtan group going from house to house early in the morning

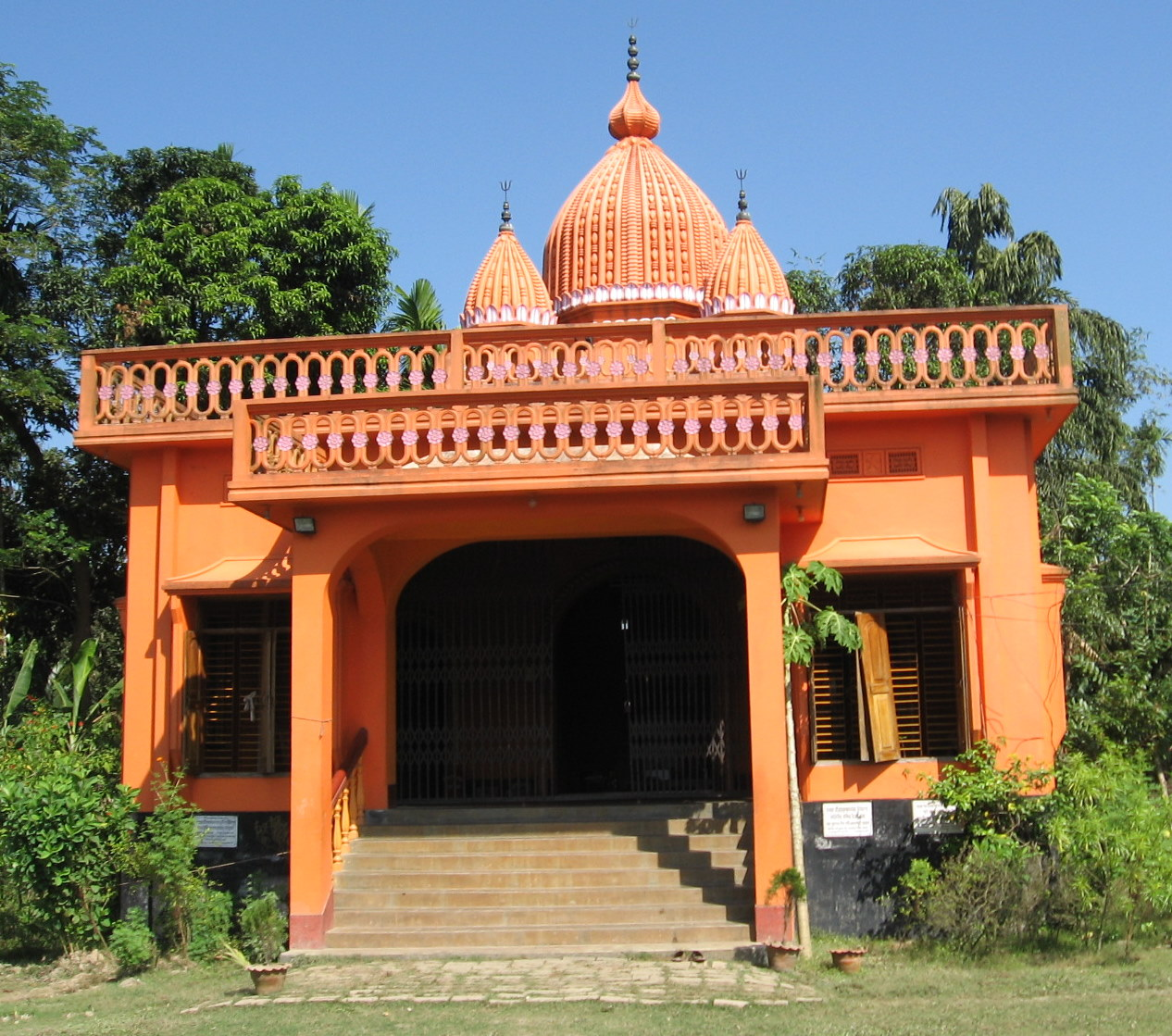
Deothan Temple

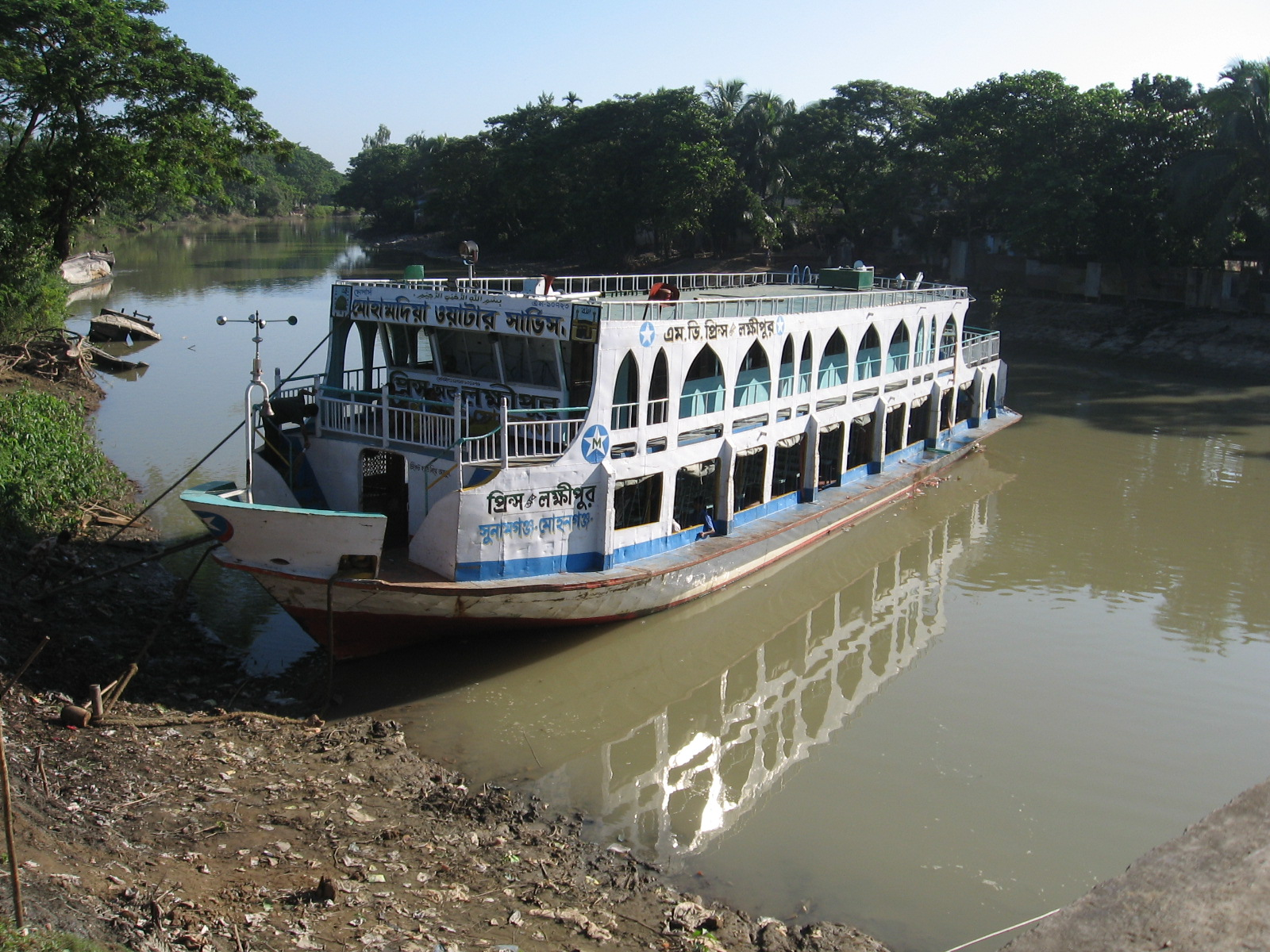
A launch in the Kangsha River at Mohanganj/ Deothan

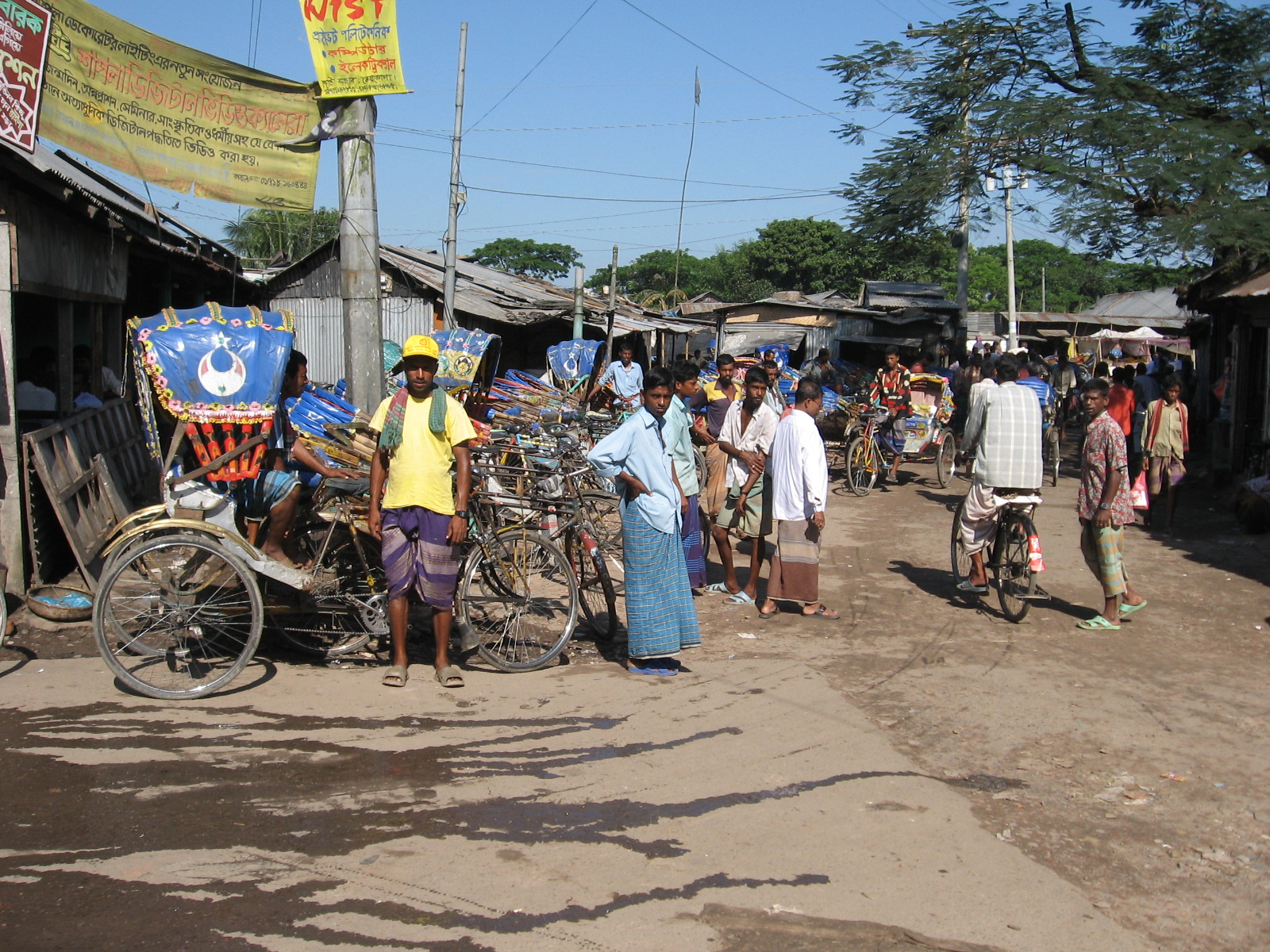
Rickshaws are the popular means of transport in Deothan

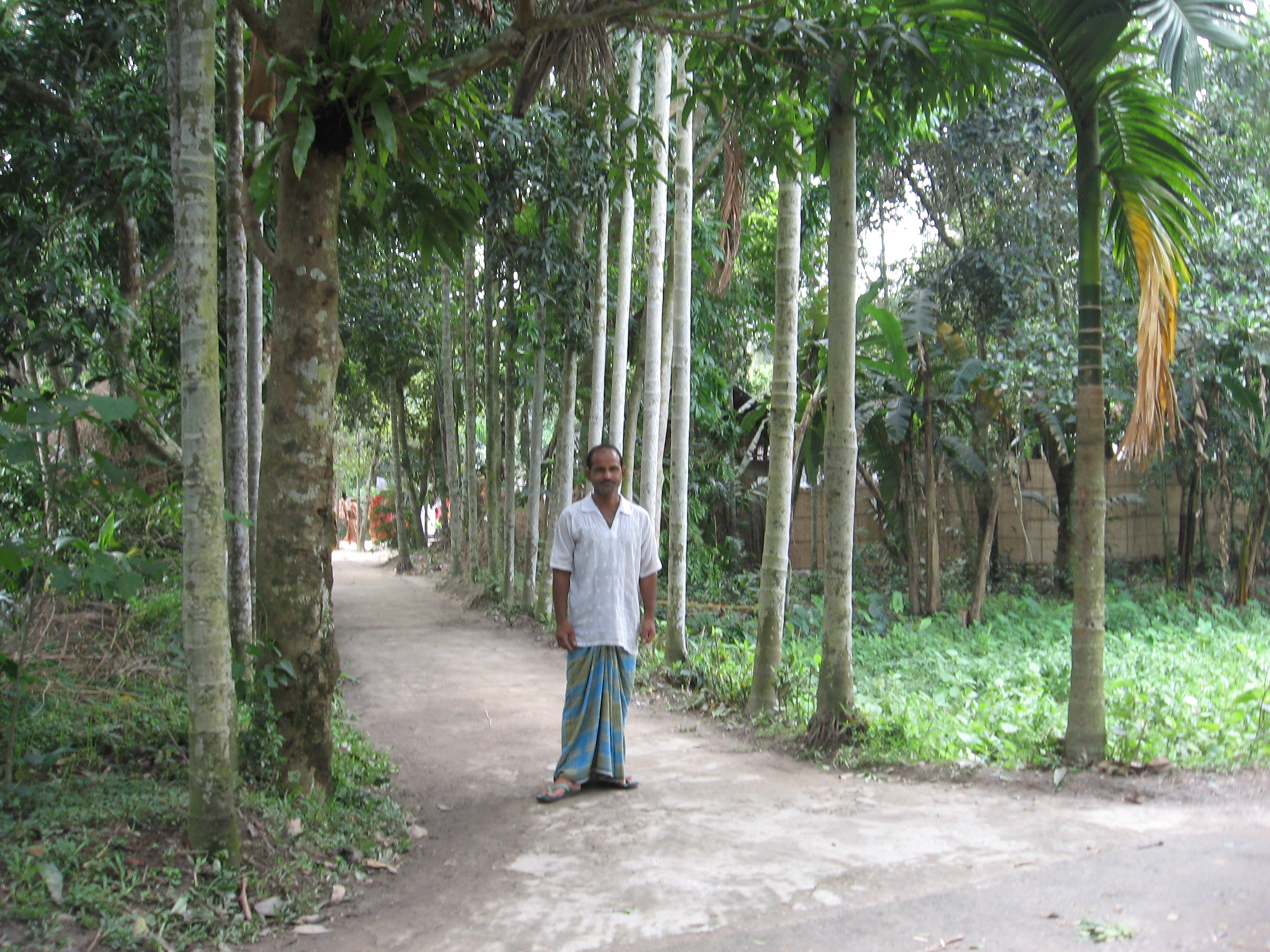
The entrance path to Deothan

== See also ==
- Haor
