= Tentulia Union =

Tentulia Union তেতুলিয়া ইউনিয়ন
- Location in Bangladesh
- Coordinates: 24.868519°N 90.971432°E
- Country: Bangladesh
- Division: Mymensingh Division
- District: Netrokona District
- Upazila: Mohanganj Upazila

Population (2022)
  - Total: 16,479
- Time zone: UTC+6 (BST)

Tentulia Union (Bengali: তেতুলিয়া ইউনিয়ন) is a union parishad under Mohanganj Upazila of Netrokona District in northern Bangladesh

== Geography ==
Union Parishads in Mohanganj Upazila
U:union parishads, M:mahalla or neighbourhood
Owing to space constraints in the small map, the actual locations in a larger map may vary slightly

Tentulia Union has a total area of 9,898 acres (4,006 ha).

== Demographics ==
According to the 2022 Bangladeshi census, Tentulia Union had 3,880 households and had a total population of 16,479 of which males numbered 8,128 and females numbered 8350. Muslims numbered 12,548, Hindus 3,928.

Tentulia Union had a literacy rate of 29.2 %.
