= Baratali Banihari Union =

Baratali Banihari Union বড়তলী বানিহারী ইউনিয়ন
- Location in Bangladesh
- Coordinates: 24.864667°N 90.991389°E
- Country: Bangladesh
- Division: Mymensingh Division
- District: Netrokona District
- Upazila: Mohanganj Upazila

Population (2022)
  - Total: 20,015
- Time zone: UTC+6 (BST)

Baratali Banihari Union (Bengali: বড়তলী বানিহারী ইউনিয়ন) is a union parishad under Mohanganj Upazila of Netrokona District in northern Bangladesh

== Geography ==
Union Parishads in Mohanganj Upazila
U:union parishads, M:mahalla or neighbourhood
Owing to space constraints in the small map, the actual locations in a larger map may vary slightly

Baratali Banihari Union has a total area of 6,403 acres (2,591 ha).

== Demographics ==
According to the 2022 Bangladeshi census, Baratali Banihari Union had 4,417 households and had a total population of 20,015 of which males numbered 9,899 and females numbered 10,114. Muslims numbered 17,434, Hindus 2,580 .

Baratali Banihari Union had a literacy rate of 41.6%.
