= Maghan Siadhar Union =

Maghan Siadhar Union মাঘান সিয়াদার ইউনিয়ন
- Location in Bangladesh
- Coordinates: 24.830974°N 90.965896°E
- Country: Bangladesh
- Division: Mymensingh Division
- District: Netrokona District
- Upazila: Mohanganj Upazila

Population (2022)
  - Total: 21,184
- Time zone: UTC+6 (BST)

Maghan Siadhar Union (Bengali: মাঘান সিয়াদার ইউনিয়ন) is a union parishad under Mohanganj Upazila of Netrokona District in northern Bangladesh

== Geography ==
Union Parishads in Mohanganj Upazila
U:union parishads, M:mahalla or neighbourhood
Owing to space constraints in the small map, the actual locations in a larger map may vary slightly

Maghan Siadhar Union has a total area of 9,177 acres (3,714 ha).

== Demographics ==
According to the 2022 Bangladeshi census, Maghan Siadhar Union had 5,254 households and had a total population of 21,184 of which males numbered 10,518 and females numbered 10,666. Muslims numbered 18,233, Hindus 2,950.

Maghan Siadhar Union had a literacy rate of 39.8%.
