= Samaj Sahialdeo Union =

Samaj Sahialdeo Union সমাজ সহিলদেও ইউনিয়ন
- Location in Bangladesh
- Coordinates: 24.803978°N 90.93896°E
- Country: Bangladesh
- Division: Mymensingh Division
- District: Netrokona District
- Upazila: Mohanganj Upazila

Population (2022)
  - Total: 21,900
- Time zone: UTC+6 (BST)

Samaj Sahialdeo Union (Bengali: সমাজ সহিলদেও ইউনিয়ন) is a union parishad under Mohanganj Upazila of Netrokona District in northern Bangladesh.

== Geography ==
Union Parishads in Mohanganj Upazila
U:union parishads, M:mahalla or neighbourhood
Owing to space constraints in the small map, the actual locations in a larger map may vary slightly

Samaj Sahialdeo Union has a total area of 7,857 acres (3,180 ha).

== Demographics ==
According to the 2022 Bangladeshi census, Samaj Sahialdeo Union had 5,302 households and had a total population of 21,900 of which males numbered 10,739 and females numbered 11,160. Muslims numbered 20,530, Hindus 1,366.

Maghan Siadhar Union had a literacy rate of 39.8%.
