= Suair Union =

Suair Union সুয়াইর ইউনিয়ন
- Location in Bangladesh
- Coordinates: 24.781978°N 90.985896°E
- Country: Bangladesh
- Division: Mymensingh Division
- District: Netrokona District
- Upazila: Mohanganj Upazila

Population (2022)
  - Total: 18,370
- Time zone: UTC+6 (BST)

Suair Union (Bengali: সুয়াইর ইউনিয়ন) is a union parishad under Mohanganj Upazila of Netrokona District in northern Bangladesh

== Geography ==
Union Parishads in Mohanganj Upazila
U:union parishads, M:mahalla or neighbourhood
Owing to space constraints in the small map, the actual locations in a larger map may vary slightly

Suair Union has a total area of 8,571 acres (3,469 ha).

== Demographics ==
According to the 2022 Bangladeshi census, Suair Union had 4,334 households with a total population of 18,370 of which 9063 were males and 9,307 females. Muslims numbered 14,400 , Hindus 3,909.

Suair Union had a literacy rate of 40.8 %.
