= Gaglajur Union =

Gaglajur Union গাগলাজুর ইউনিয়ন
- Location in Bangladesh
- Coordinates: 24.791356°N 91.070217°E
- Country: Bangladesh
- Division: Mymensingh Division
- District: Netrokona District
- Upazila: Mohanganj Upazila

Population (2022)
  - Total: 16,195
- Time zone: UTC+6 (BST)

Gaglajur Union (Bengali: গাগলাজুর ইউনিয়ন) is a union parishad under Mohanganj Upazila of Netrokona District in northern Bangladesh

== Geography ==
Union Parishads in Mohanganj Upazila
U:union parishads, M:mahalla or neighbourhood
Owing to space constraints in the small map, the actual locations in a larger map may vary slightly

Gaglajur Union has a total area of 10,831 acres (4,383 ha).

== Demographics ==
According to the 2022 Bangladeshi census, Gaglajur Union had 3,826 households and had a total population of 16,195 of which males numbered 79,26 and females numbered 8,269. Muslims numbered 14,129, Hindus 2,066.

Gaglajur Union had a literacy rate of 34.5%.
