= Mohanganj Upazila =

Mohanganj মোহনগঞ্জ
- Upazila
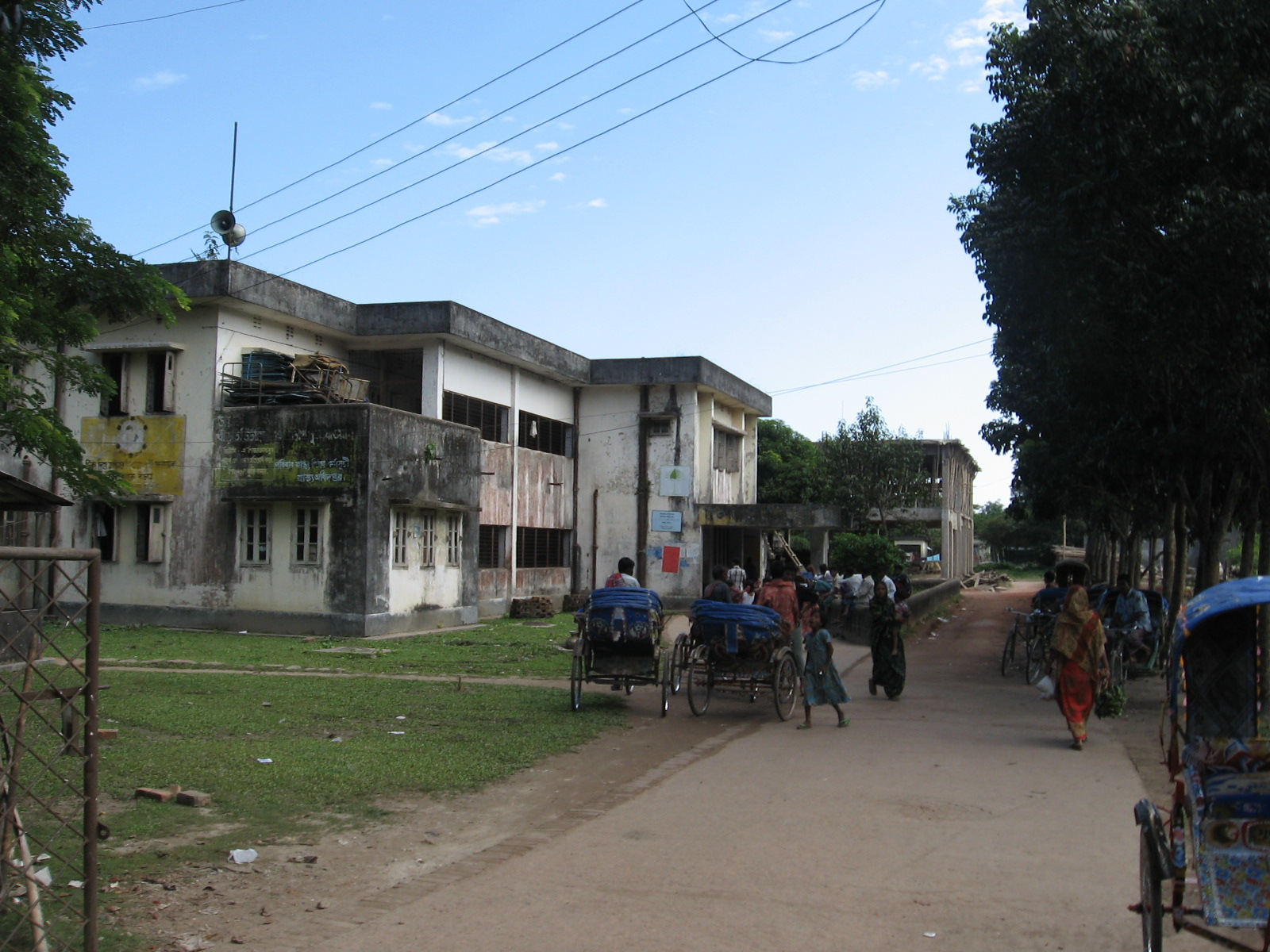
- A Hospital in Mohanganj

- Coordinates: 24°52′N 90°58′E
- Country: Bangladesh
- Division: Mymensingh
- District: Netrokona

Area
  - Total: 243.2 km^{2} (93.9 sq mi)

Population (2022)
  - Total: 166,421
  - Density: 684.3/km^{2} (1,772/sq mi)
- Time zone: UTC+6 (BST)
- Postal code: 2446
- Area code: 09524
- Website: http://mohongonj.netrokona.gov.bd/

Mohanganj Upazila mauza geocode map

Mohanganj (Bengali: মোহনগঞ্জ) is an upazila of Netrokona District in the Mymensingh Division of Bangladesh. It is one of the 10 upazilas of Netrakona district. Mohanganj is largely known as the capital and economic heart of Lower Bangladesh generally known as Haor.

== Geography ==
Mohanganj is located at 24.8667°N 90.9667°E. It has 24011 households and a total area of 243.2 km^{2}. The Upazila is bounded by Barhatta Upazilas and Sunamganj district on the north, Khaliajuri and Sunamganj district on the east, Madan Upazila on the south and Atpara Upazila on the west.

Mohanganj is a true example of riverine Bangladesh. This part of Bangladesh is beautified by the famous Kangsha River (Bengali: কংস নদী) which is also the backbone of transportation and economic system. Except this, numerous canals, small rivers crisscrossed that land and established itself as an important Upazila of rural Bangladesh.

== Demographics ==
Historical population
Year	Pop.	±%
1981	107,934	—
1991	129,415	+19.9%
2001	143,740	+11.1%
2011	167,507	+16.5%
2022	166,415	−0.7%
Source: Bangladesh Bureau of Statistics

Religions in Mohanganj Upazila (2022)
Religion	Percent
Islam	85.05%
Hinduism	14.91%
Other or not stated	0.04%

According to the 2022 Bangladeshi census, Mohanganj Upazila had 39,029 households and a population of 166,421. 10.12% of the population were under 5 years of age. Mohanganj had a literacy rate (age 7 and over) of 66.60%: 67.57% for males and 65.66% for females, and a sex ratio of 97.59 males for 100 females. 38,612 (23.21%) lived in urban areas.

== Points of interest ==
There is an ancient fort at the village Betham (Sultan Alauddin Hussain Shah period), Sheikh Bari Mosque (same period), and Daulatpur Temple (876 BS).

== Economy ==
Agriculture 48.25%, fishing 2.62%, agricultural laborer 21.21%, wage laborer 2.53%, commerce 9.84%, service 3.49% and others 12.06%.

Fertile land 24864.43 hectares, fallow land 390.84 hectares; single crop 52%, double crop 38% and treble crop land 10%; land under irrigation 71%.

== Administration ==
Mohanganj Thana, now an upazila, was formed on 6 April 1920.

Mohanganj Upazila is divided into Mohanganj Municipality and seven union parishads: Barkashia Birampur , Baratali Banihari, Gaglajur, Maghan Siadhar, Samaj Sahialdo, Suair, and Tentulia. The union parishads are subdivided into 111 mauzas and 163 villages.

Mohanganj Municipality is subdivided into 9 wards and 18 mahallas.

Mohanganj Pourosabha is divided into nine wards as noted below

Ward No.	Region	Households	Population (2022)
1	Naohai, Nohai, Tengapara (part)*, Tengarpara (part)	1014	4465
2	Tengapara (part)*, Tengarpara (part)	727	2960
3	Hat Mohanganj, Hat Mohanganj, Tengarpara (part)*, Tengapara (part)	293	1368
4	Baroichira, Baroichira, Deothan*, Deothan, Mirarganti, Mirarganti	3093	9208
5	Mairora*, Mairora	742	3144
6	Banda Pareha*, Banda Pahreha, Kaziati*, Kazati, Satur&, Satur	646	2884
7	Bartargati*, Bartargati, Prasannapur, Daulatpur (part)*, Daulatpur (part), Pukuria*, Pukuria, Rautpara*, Rautpara	1567	6527
8	Daulatpur (part)*, Daulatpur	981	4429
9	Daulatpur (part)*, Daulatpur	856	3514

- Mouzas

== Transport ==
Mohanganj Upazila has a strong waterway connection with Sylhet, Sunamganj, Bhairab Bazar and Dhaka. Alongside, the road network system connected it with Netrokona, Mymensingh and to the capital, Dhaka. There is two intercity train now running from Dhaka to Mohanganj. Haor express departs at 11:50pm from kamlapur railway station and Mohanganj express departs Dhaka at 2:20 pm. Visiting Tanguar Haor through this route is also a good option other than the popular Sunamganj route.

== Gallery ==
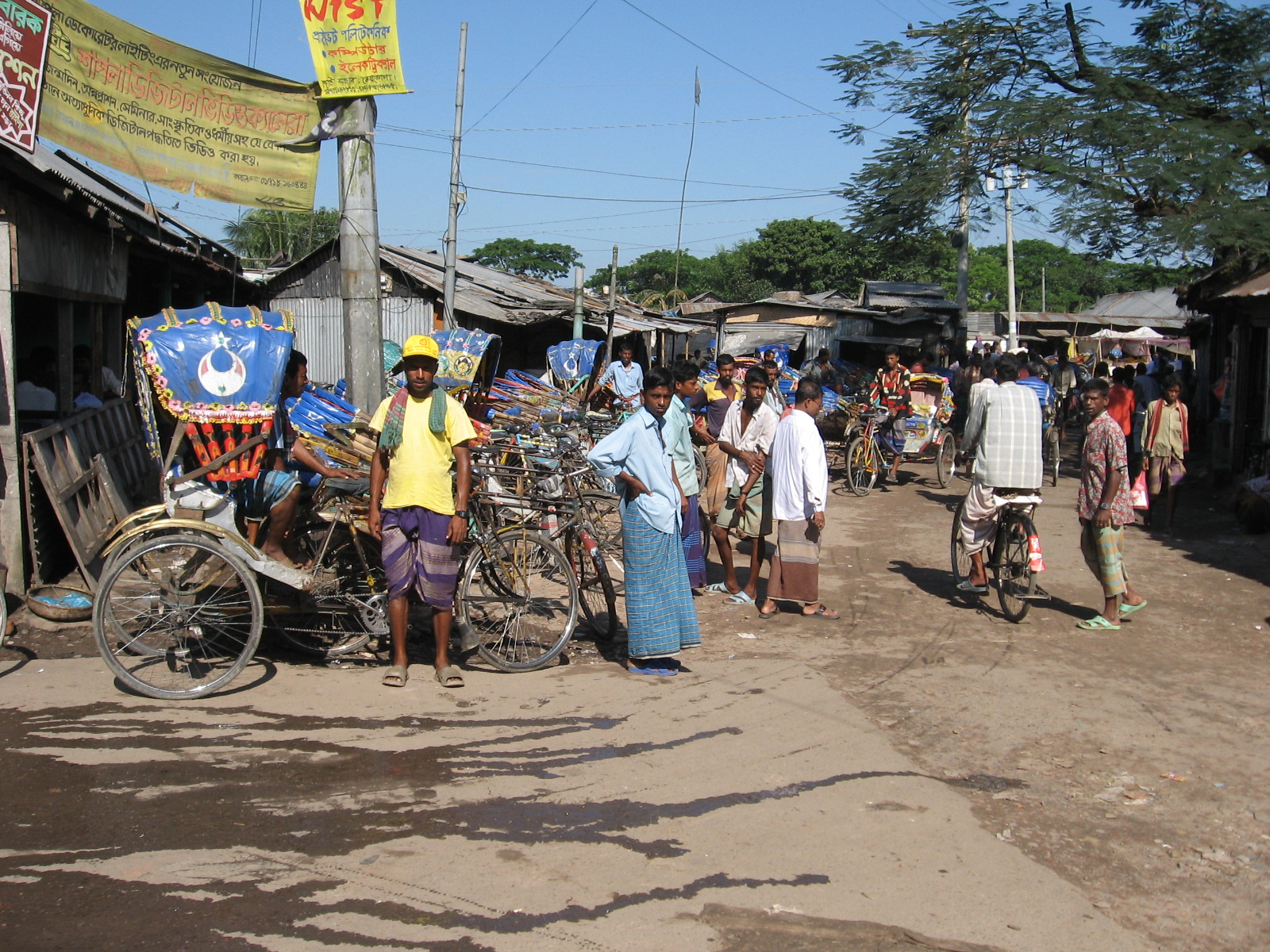
Rickshaw stand near the market

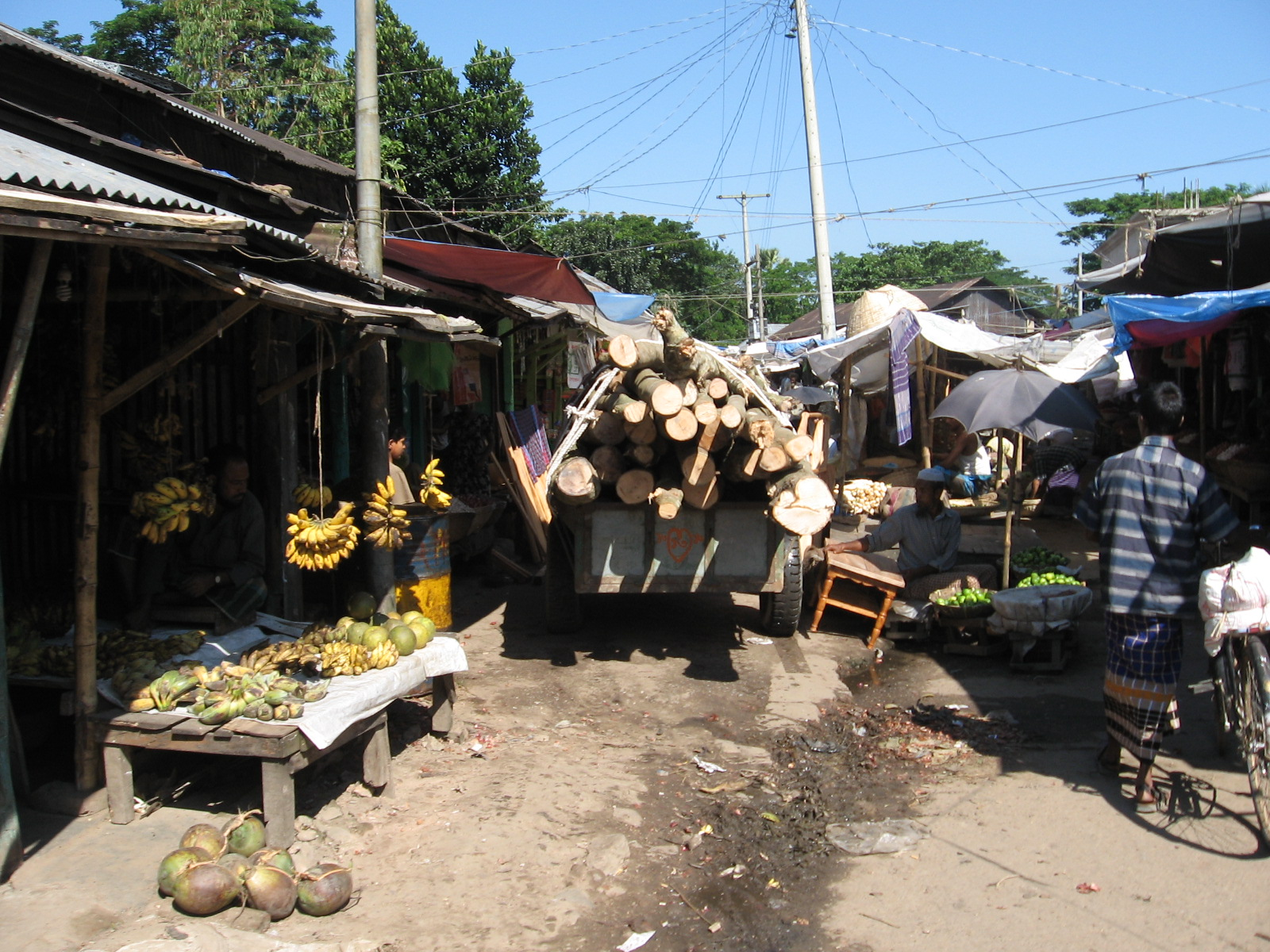
Market alley

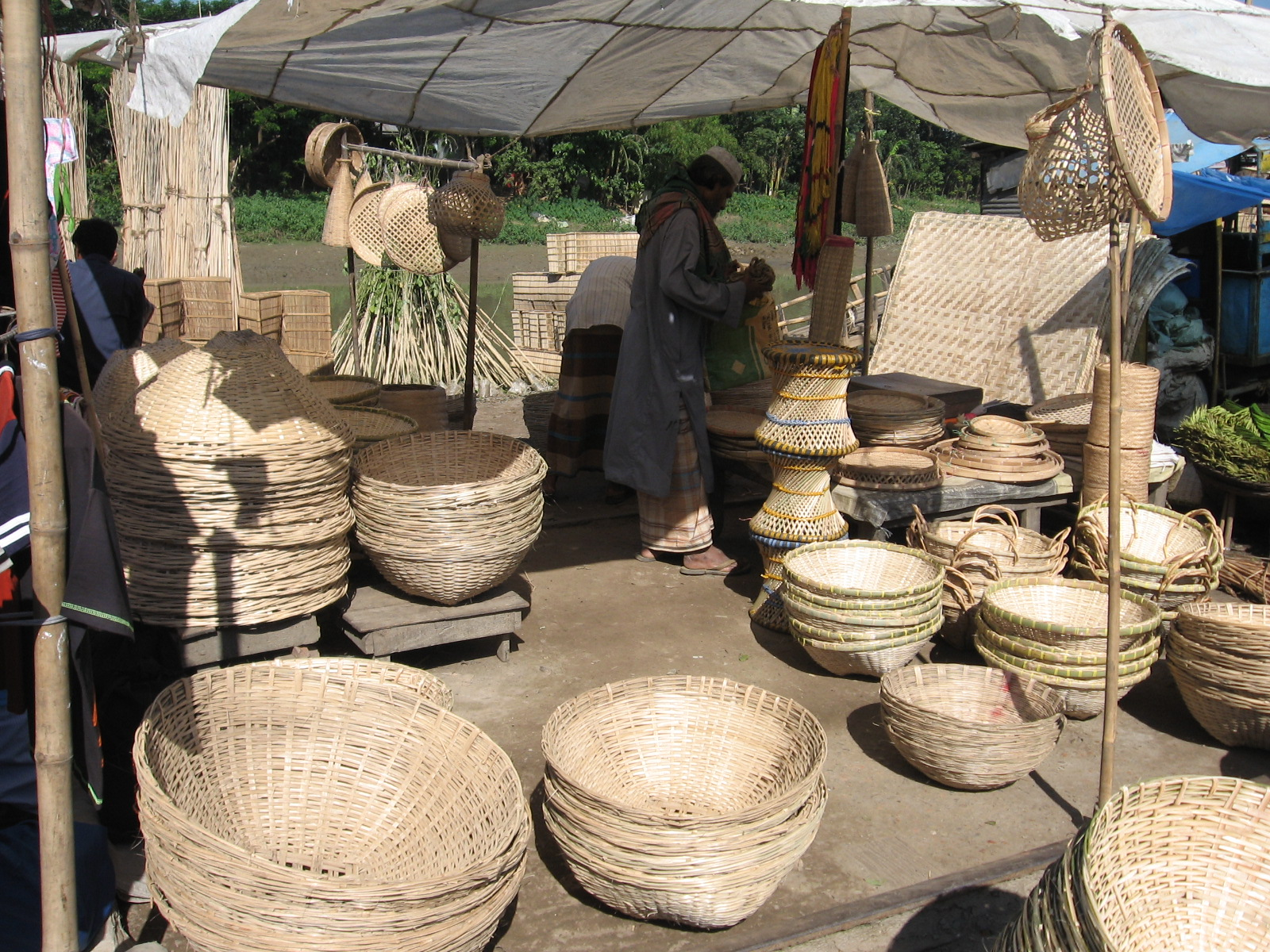
Bamboo products of Mohanganj

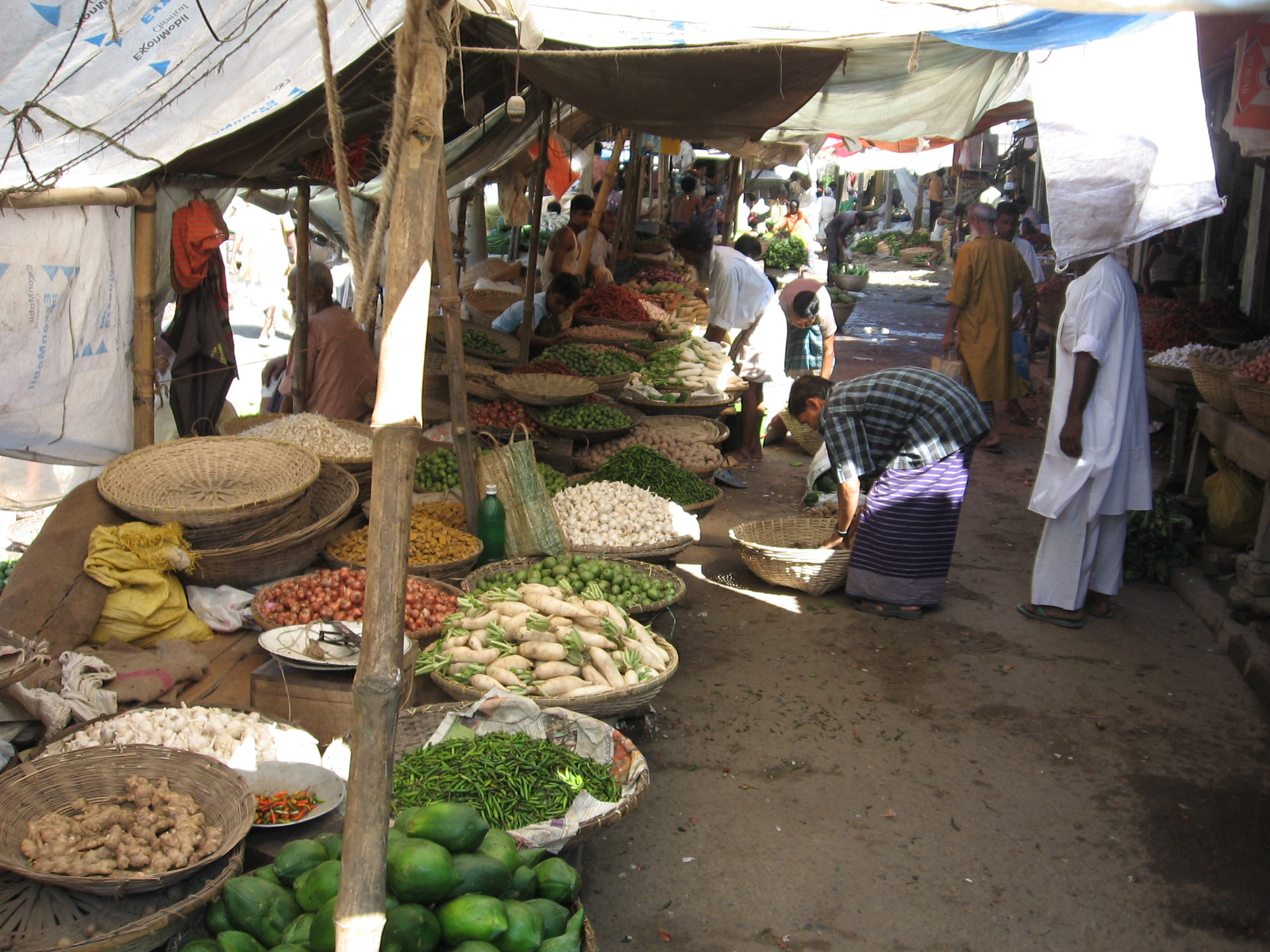
Vegetable market

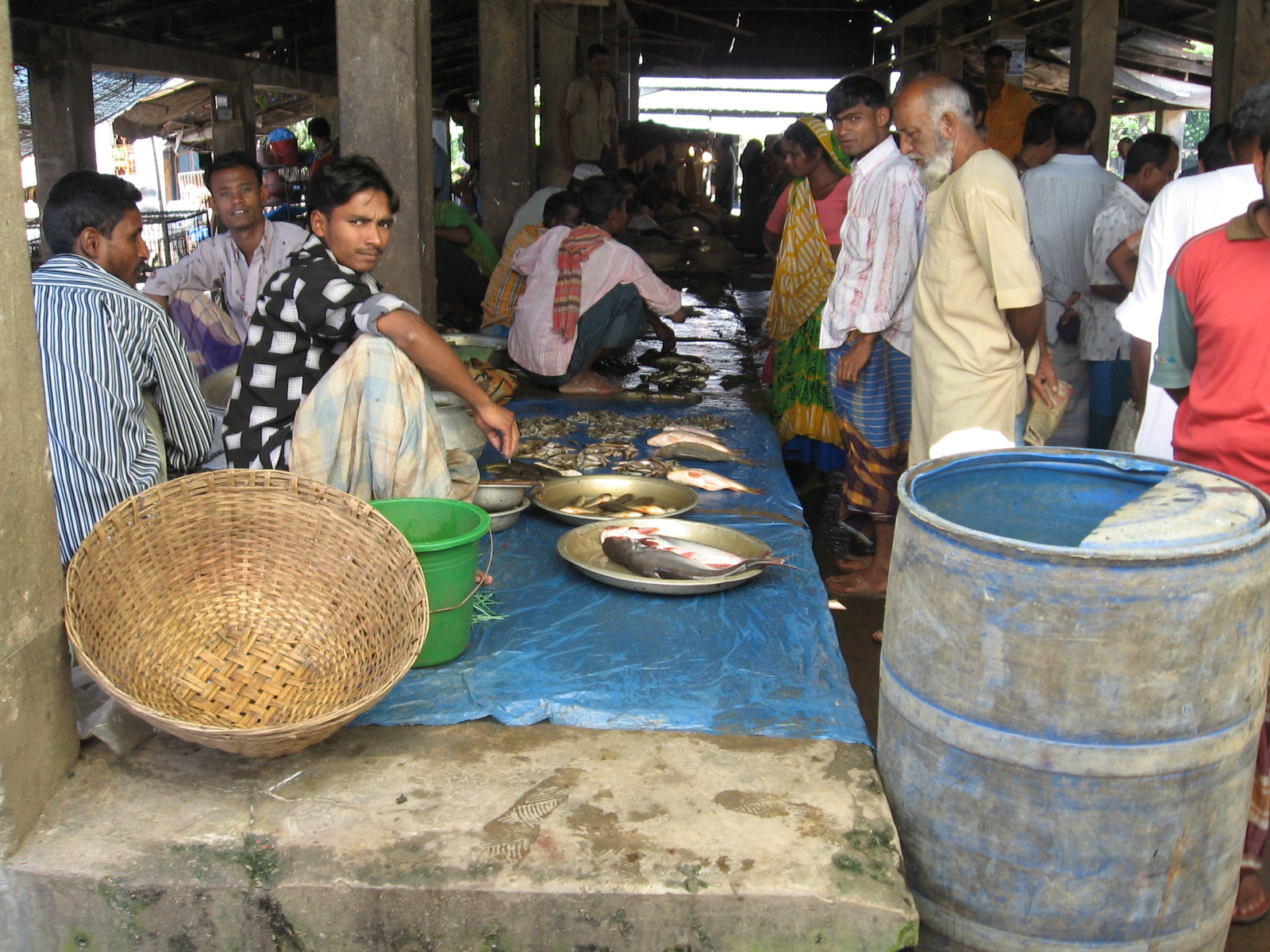
Fish market

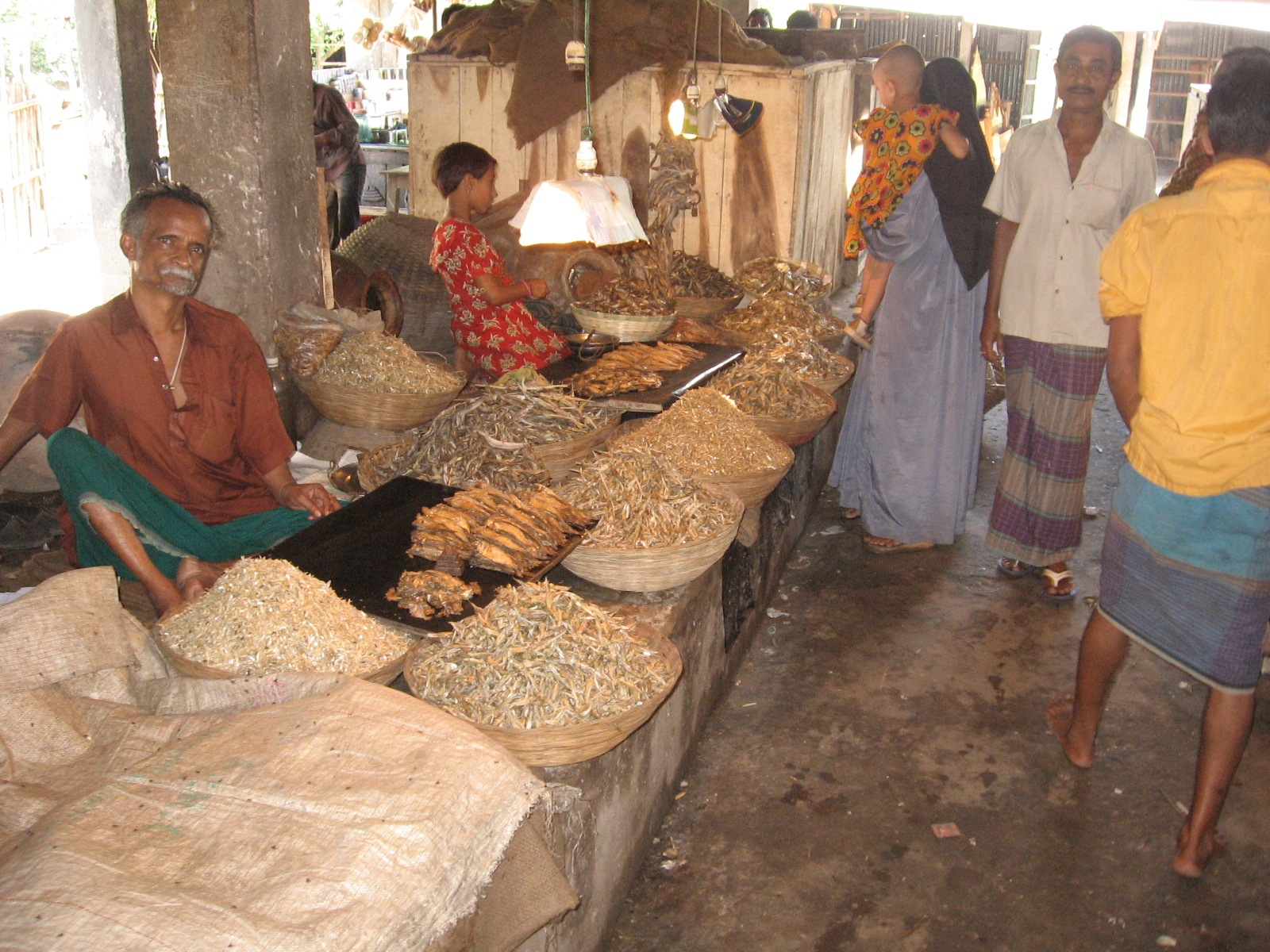
Dry fish market

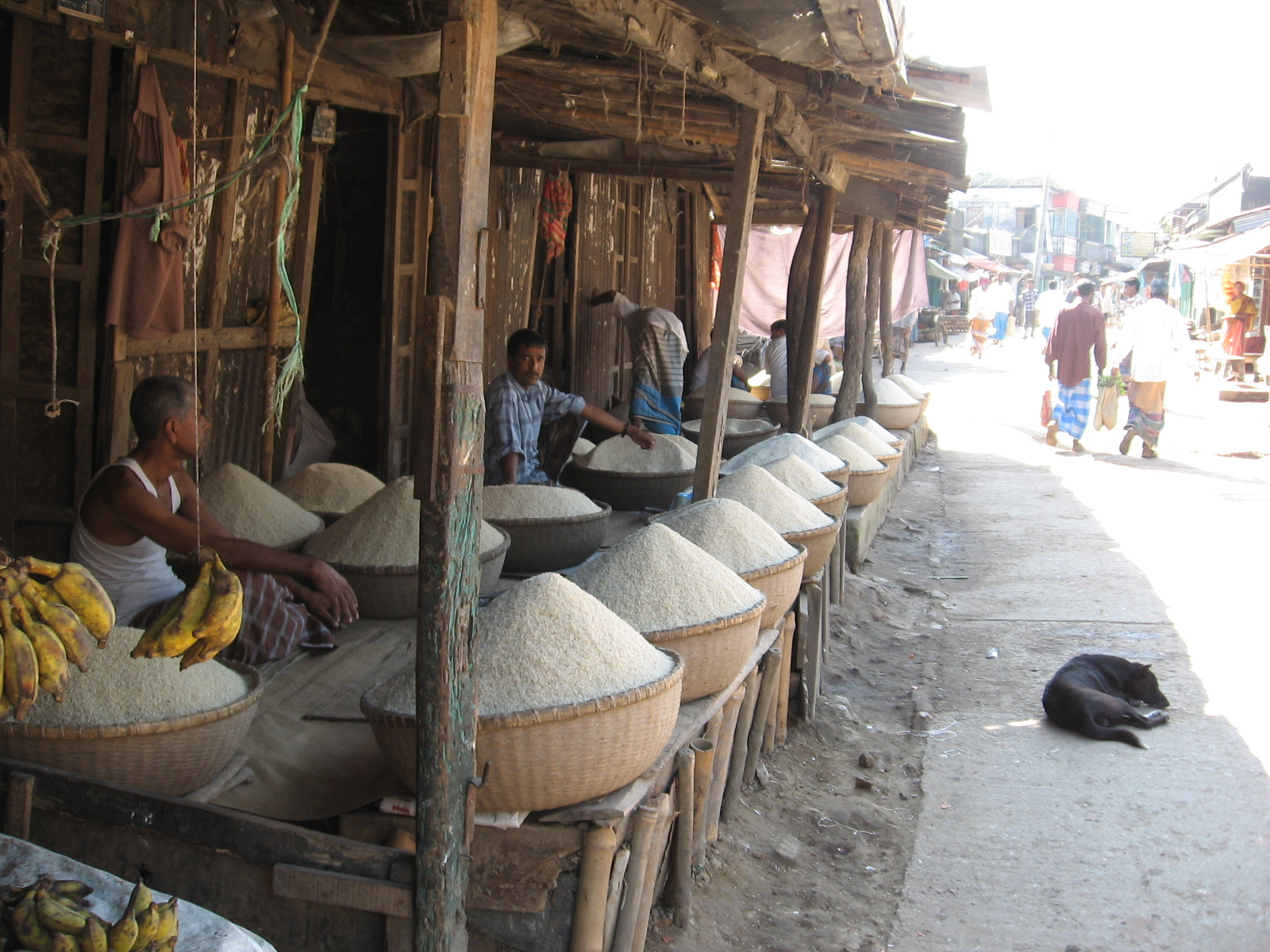
Rice market

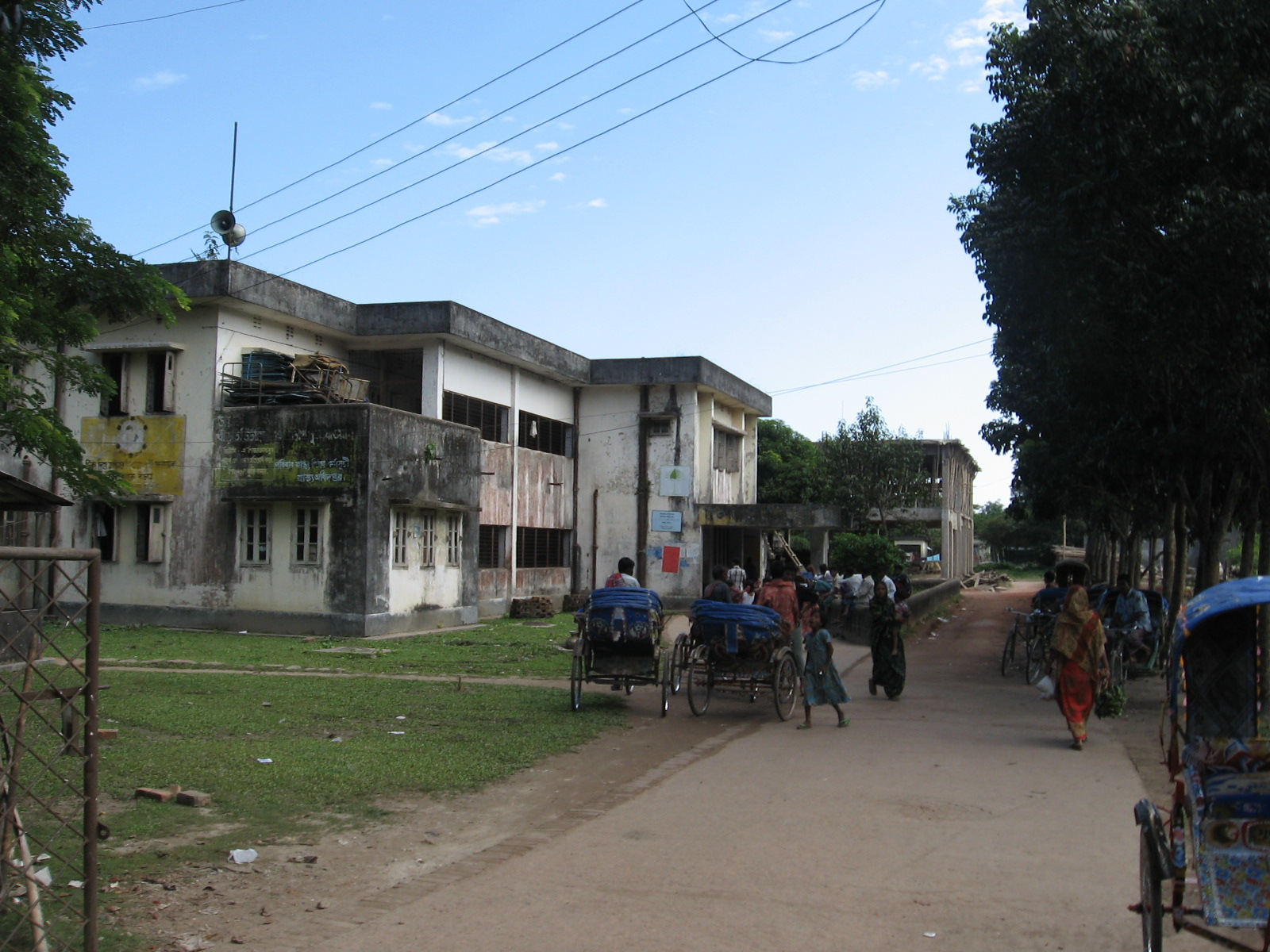
Government hospital

== See also ==
- Upazilas of Bangladesh
- Districts of Bangladesh
- Divisions of Bangladesh
- Deothan
