= Kangsha River =

Coordinates: 25.0181°N 90.5316°E

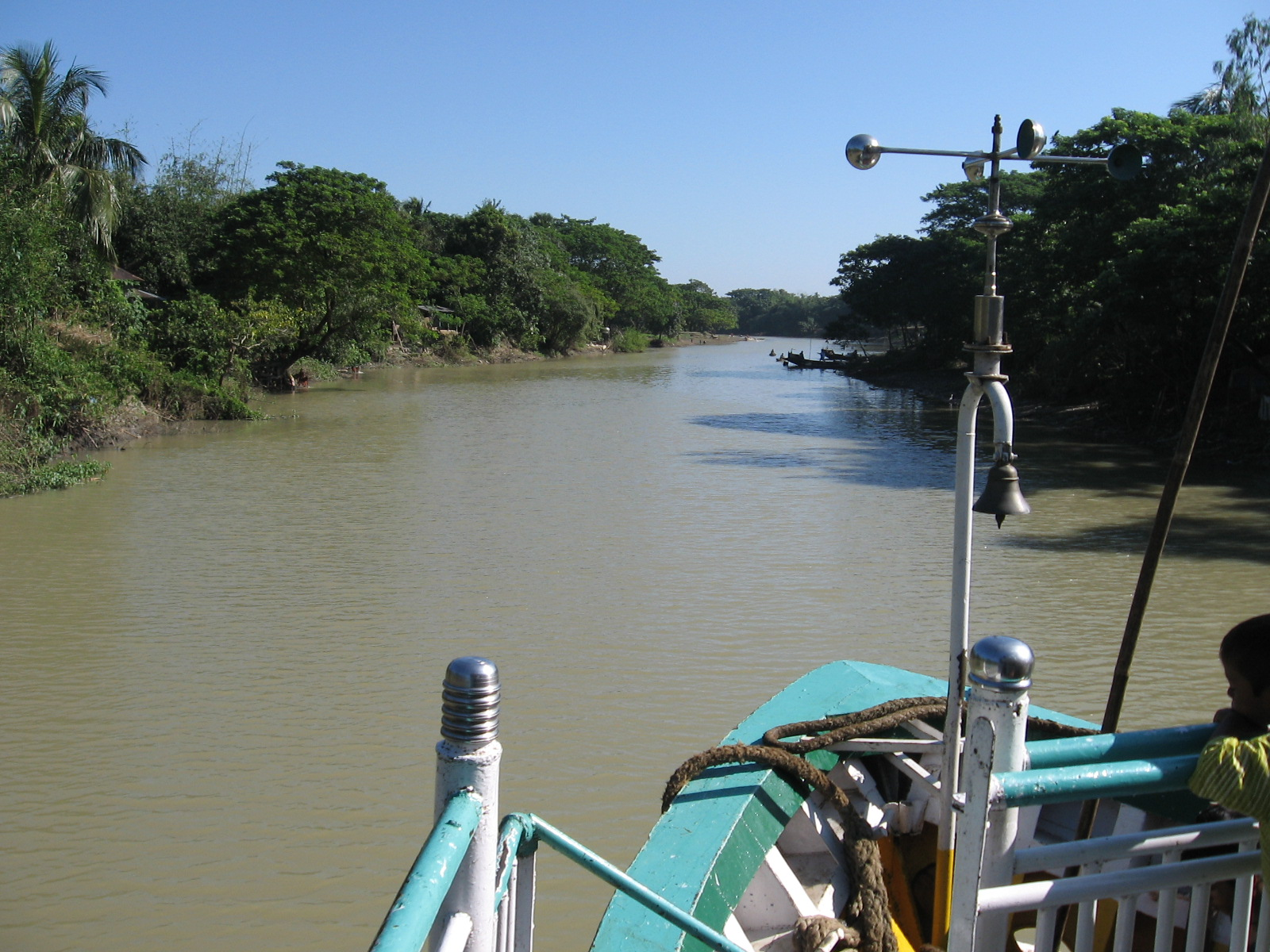
- View of the Kangsha River from a launch

Location
- Country: Bangladesh
- Districts: Mymensingh; Netrakona; Sunamganj

Physical characteristics
- Discharge
  - location: Surma River

The Kangsha (Bengali: কংস নদী, romanized: kaṁsa nadī) (also known as the Kangsai or the Kangsabati) is a river in the northern parts of Mymensingh and Netrakona districts of Bangladesh. The Someshwari is one of the main rivers that join it from the north.

== Course ==
At Gaglajuri, the Dhanu river is joined by the Kangsha which flows from the Garo Hills past Nalitabari as the Bhogai, which is at its best in the Netrakona subdivision at Deotukon and Barhatta. After Mohanganj it becomes a narrow, winding khal (creek) with banks little higher than its own lowest level.

The river flows past Barhatta, Mohanganj and Dharampasha upazilas. The Dhala and Dhanu rivers which flow into Kishoreganj District are branches of the Kangsha. The Kangsha flows into the mighty Surma River in Sunamganj District.

== Watershed ==
According to a report on wetland protection, "All floodwaters come from the Garo/Meghalaya Hills through a number of hill streams and rivers."

== Gallery ==
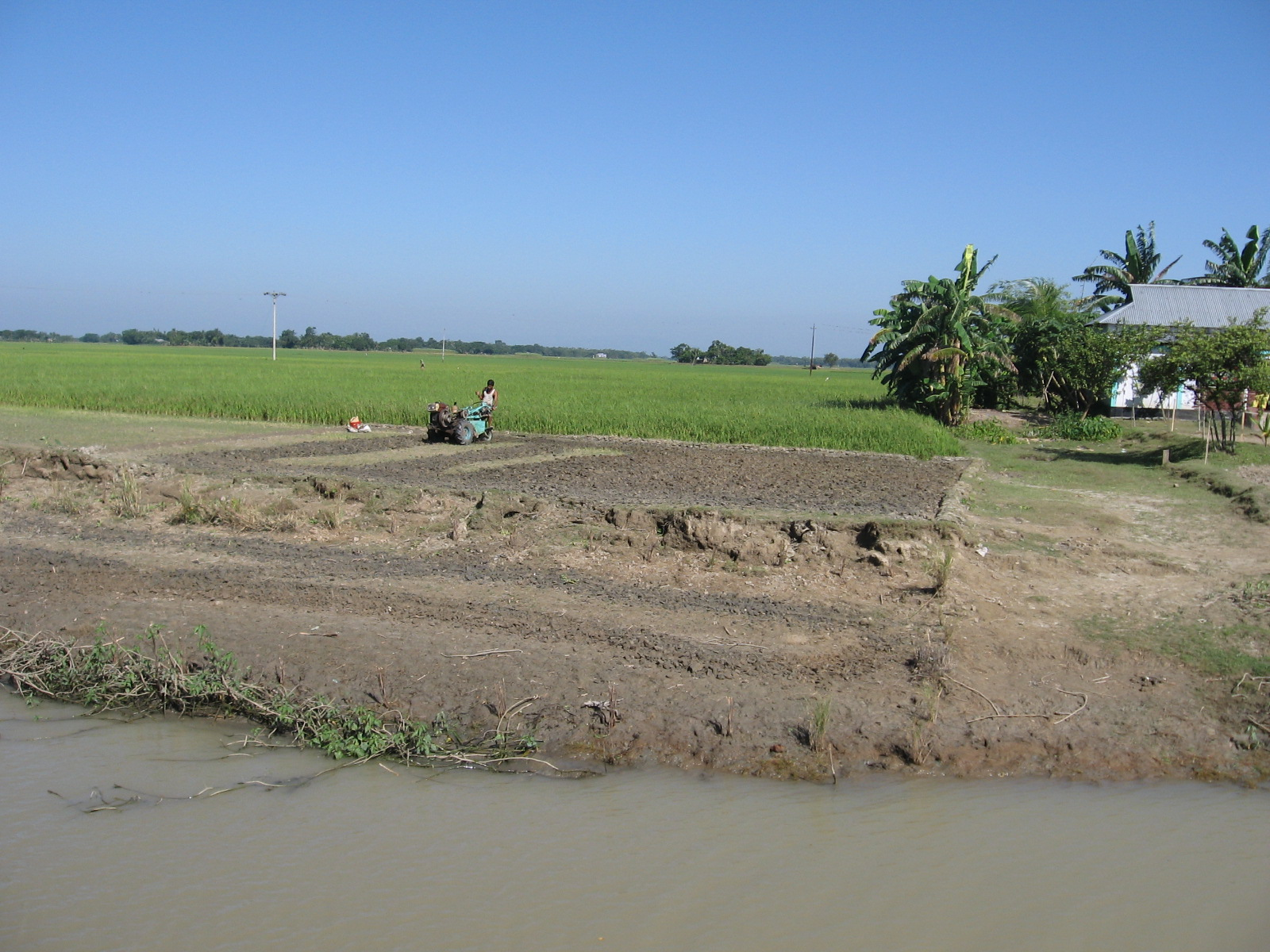
A farmer busy on the banks of the Kangsha River

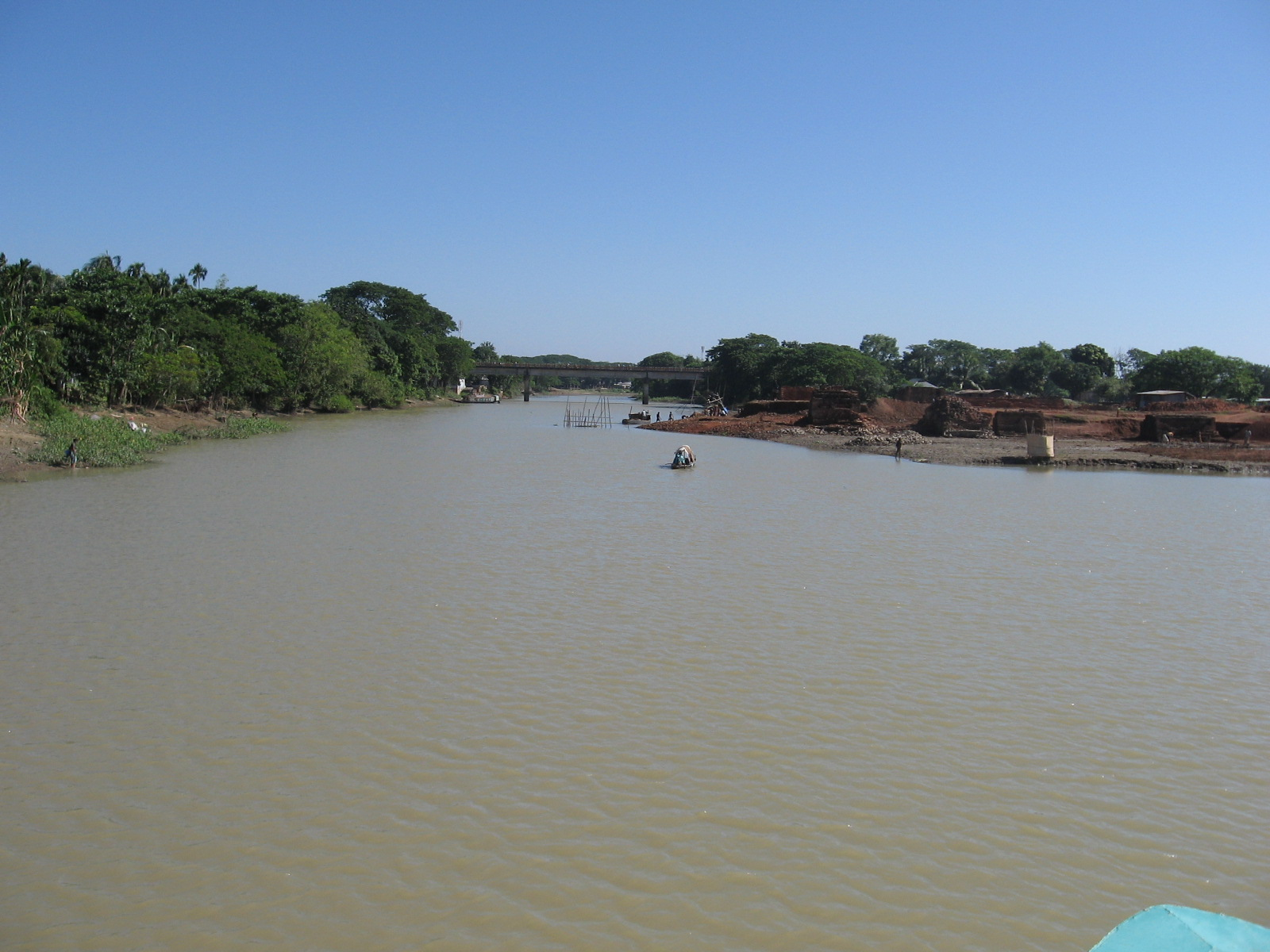
A brick kiln at Dharampasha on the banks of the Kangsha River

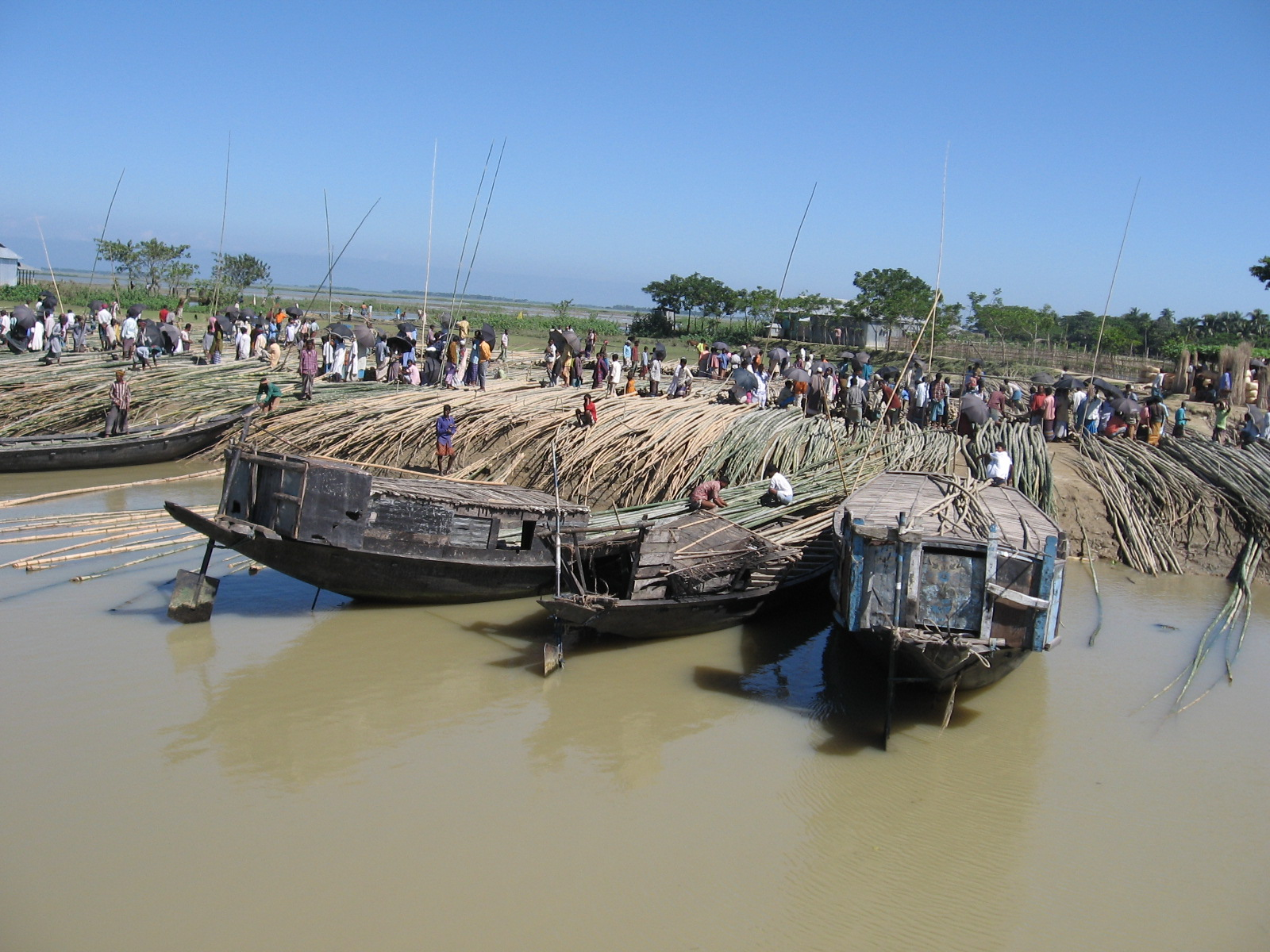
The bamboo market at Pashukhali
